= Buxerolles =

Buxerolles may refer to the following places in France:

- Buxerolles, Côte-d'Or, a commune in the department of Côte-d'Or
- Buxerolles, Vienne, a commune in the department of Vienne
