= Genay =

Genay is the name of the following communes in France:

- Genay, Côte-d'Or, in the Côte-d'Or department
- Genay, Rhône, in the Rhône department
