= Buncey =

- Commune
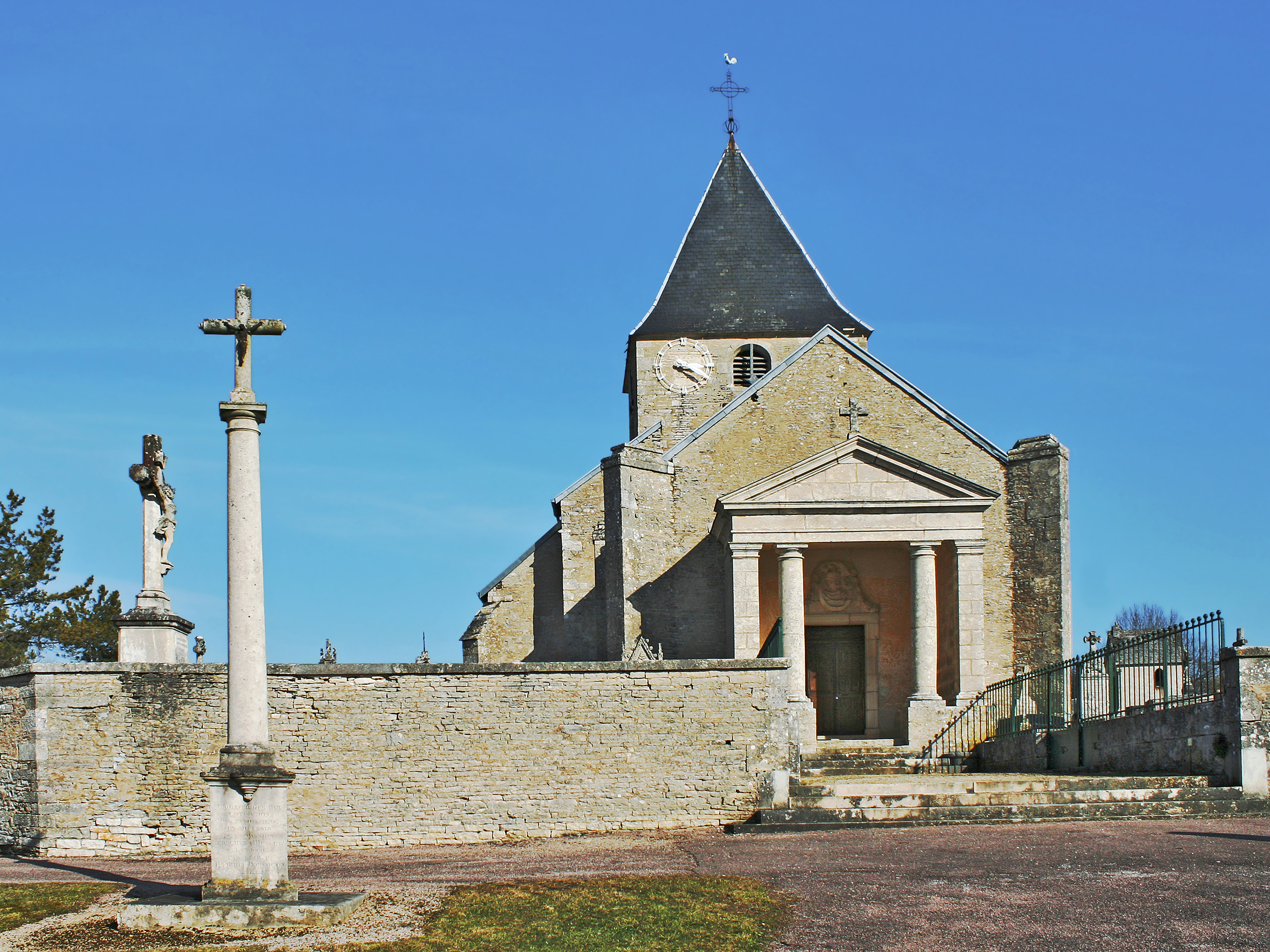
- The church in Buncey

- Coat of arms
- Location of Buncey
- Location within France Location within Bourgogne-Franche-Comté
- Coordinates: 47°49′26″N 4°33′47″E
- Country: France
- Region: Bourgogne-Franche-Comté
- Department: Côte-d'Or
- Arrondissement: Montbard
- Canton: Châtillon-sur-Seine
- Intercommunality: Pays Châtillonnais

Government
  - Mayor (2020–2026): Christian Bornot
- Area^{1}: 27.02 km^{2} (10.43 sq mi)
- Elevation: 232 m (761 ft)
- Highest elevation: 334 m (1,096 ft)
- Lowest elevation: 222 m (728 ft)
- Population (2023): 357
  - Density: 13.2/km^{2} (34.2/sq mi)
- Time zone: UTC+01:00 (CET)
  - Summer (DST): UTC+02:00 (CEST)
- INSEE/Postal code: 21115 /21400
- ^{1} French Land Register data, which excludes lakes, ponds, glaciers > 1 km^{2} (0.386 sq mi or 247 acres) and river estuaries.

Buncey (French pronunciation: [bœ̃sɛ]) is a commune in the Côte-d'Or department in eastern France.

== Population ==
Historical population
Year	Pop.	±% p.a.
1968	352	—
1975	286	−2.92%
1982	364	+3.51%
1990	395	+1.03%
1999	386	−0.26%
2007	379	−0.23%
2012	386	+0.37%
2017	378	−0.42%
2023	357	−0.95%
Source: INSEE

== See also ==
- Communes of the Côte-d'Or department
