= Étalante =

- Commune
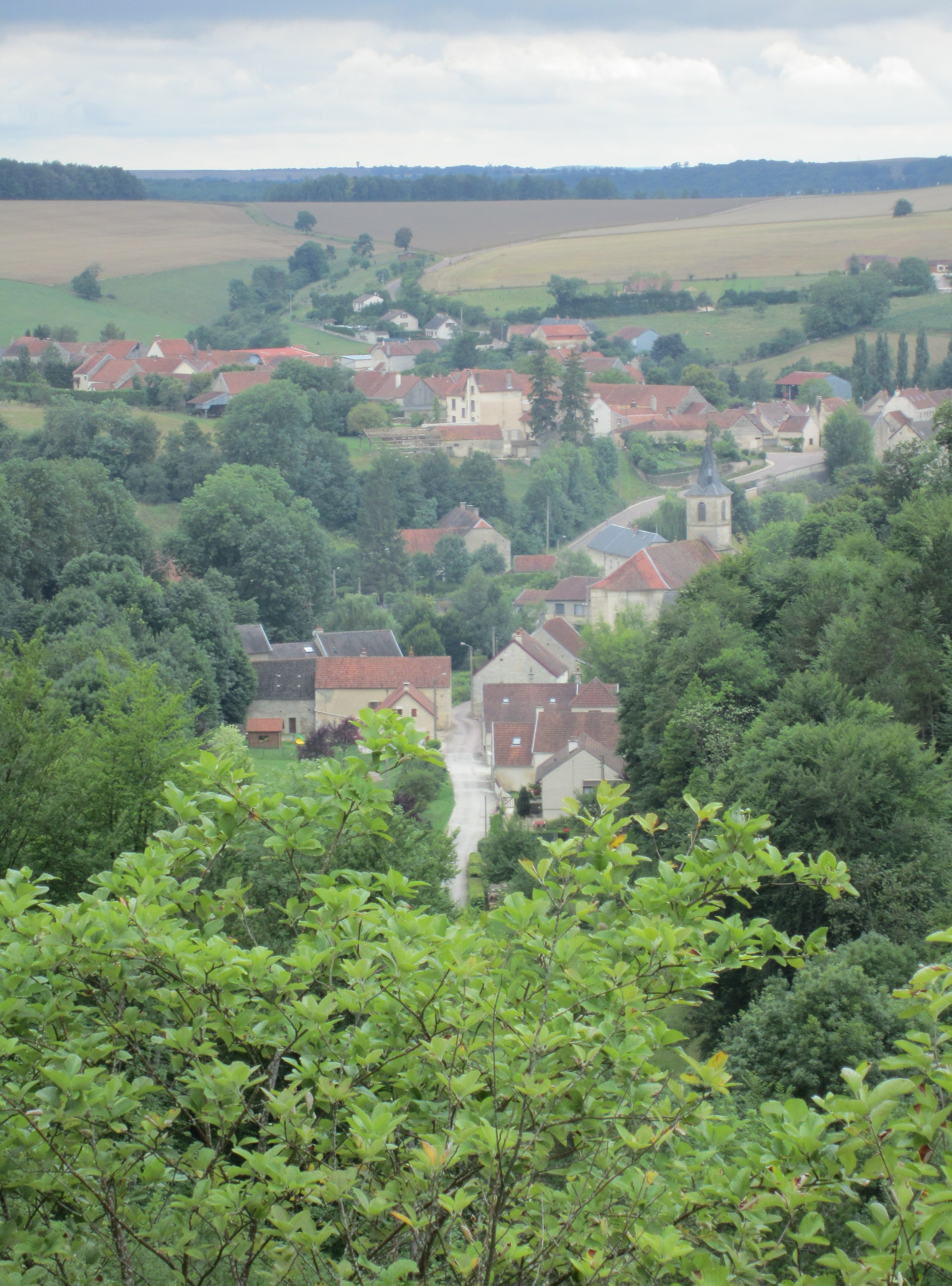
- A general view of Étalante

- Coat of arms
- Location of Étalante
- Location within France Location within Bourgogne-Franche-Comté
- Coordinates: 47°38′32″N 4°45′48″E
- Country: France
- Region: Bourgogne-Franche-Comté
- Department: Côte-d'Or
- Arrondissement: Montbard
- Canton: Châtillon-sur-Seine
- Intercommunality: Pays Châtillonnais

Government
  - Mayor (2020–2026): Eric Dudouet
- Area^{1}: 39.15 km^{2} (15.12 sq mi)
- Elevation: 442 m (1,450 ft)
- Highest elevation: 477 m (1,565 ft)
- Lowest elevation: 329 m (1,079 ft)
- Population (2023): 126
  - Density: 3.22/km^{2} (8.34/sq mi)
- Time zone: UTC+01:00 (CET)
  - Summer (DST): UTC+02:00 (CEST)
- INSEE/Postal code: 21253 /21510
- ^{1} French Land Register data, which excludes lakes, ponds, glaciers > 1 km^{2} (0.386 sq mi or 247 acres) and river estuaries.

Étalante (French pronunciation: [etalɑ̃t]) is a commune in the Côte-d'Or department in eastern France.

== Population ==
Historical population
Year	Pop.	±% p.a.
1968	299	—
1975	238	−3.21%
1982	195	−2.81%
1990	185	−0.66%
1999	144	−2.75%
2007	132	−1.08%
2012	122	−1.56%
2017	156	+5.04%
2023	126	−3.50%
Source: INSEE

== See also ==
- Communes of the Côte-d'Or department
