= Quemigny-sur-Seine =

- Commune
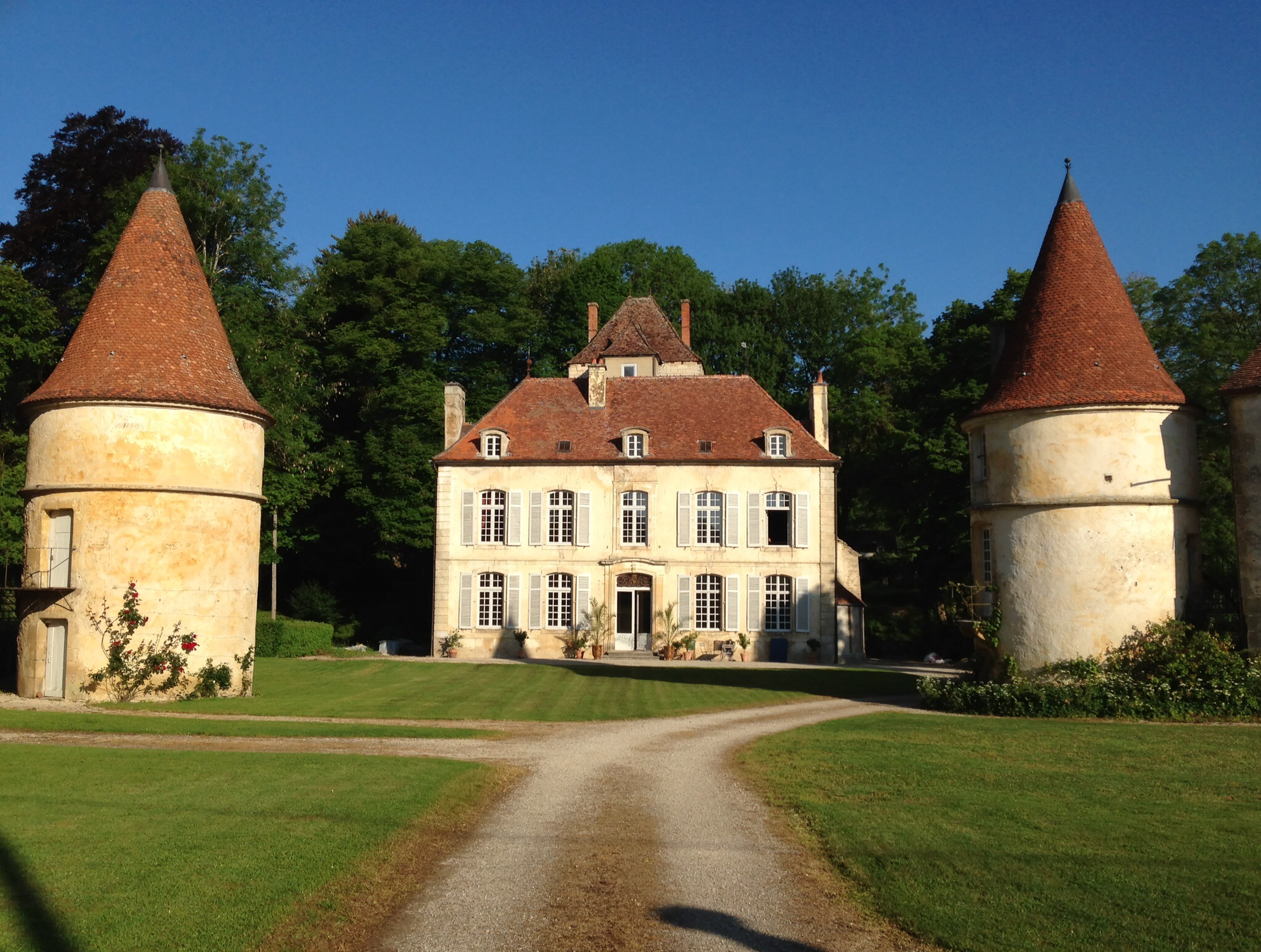
- Chateau

- Coat of arms
- Location of Quemigny-sur-Seine
- Location within France Location within Bourgogne-Franche-Comté
- Coordinates: 47°39′47″N 4°40′05″E
- Country: France
- Region: Bourgogne-Franche-Comté
- Department: Côte-d'Or
- Arrondissement: Montbard
- Canton: Châtillon-sur-Seine
- Intercommunality: Pays Châtillonnais

Government
  - Mayor (2020–2026): Philippe Lecoeur
- Area^{1}: 21.34 km^{2} (8.24 sq mi)
- Elevation: 350 m (1,150 ft)
- Highest elevation: 422 m (1,385 ft)
- Lowest elevation: 285 m (935 ft)
- Population (2023): 90
  - Density: 4.2/km^{2} (11/sq mi)
- Time zone: UTC+01:00 (CET)
  - Summer (DST): UTC+02:00 (CEST)
- INSEE/Postal code: 21514 /21510
- ^{1} French Land Register data, which excludes lakes, ponds, glaciers > 1 km^{2} (0.386 sq mi or 247 acres) and river estuaries.

Quemigny-sur-Seine (French pronunciation: [kəmiɲi syʁ sɛn], literally Quemigny on Seine) is a commune in the Côte-d'Or department in eastern France.

== Population ==
Historical population
Year	Pop.	±% p.a.
1968	195	—
1975	151	−3.59%
1982	130	−2.12%
1990	136	+0.57%
1999	131	−0.42%
2007	118	−1.30%
2012	102	−2.87%
2017	98	−0.80%
2023	90	−1.41%
Source: INSEE

== See also ==
- Communes of the Côte-d'Or department
