= Obtrée =

- Commune
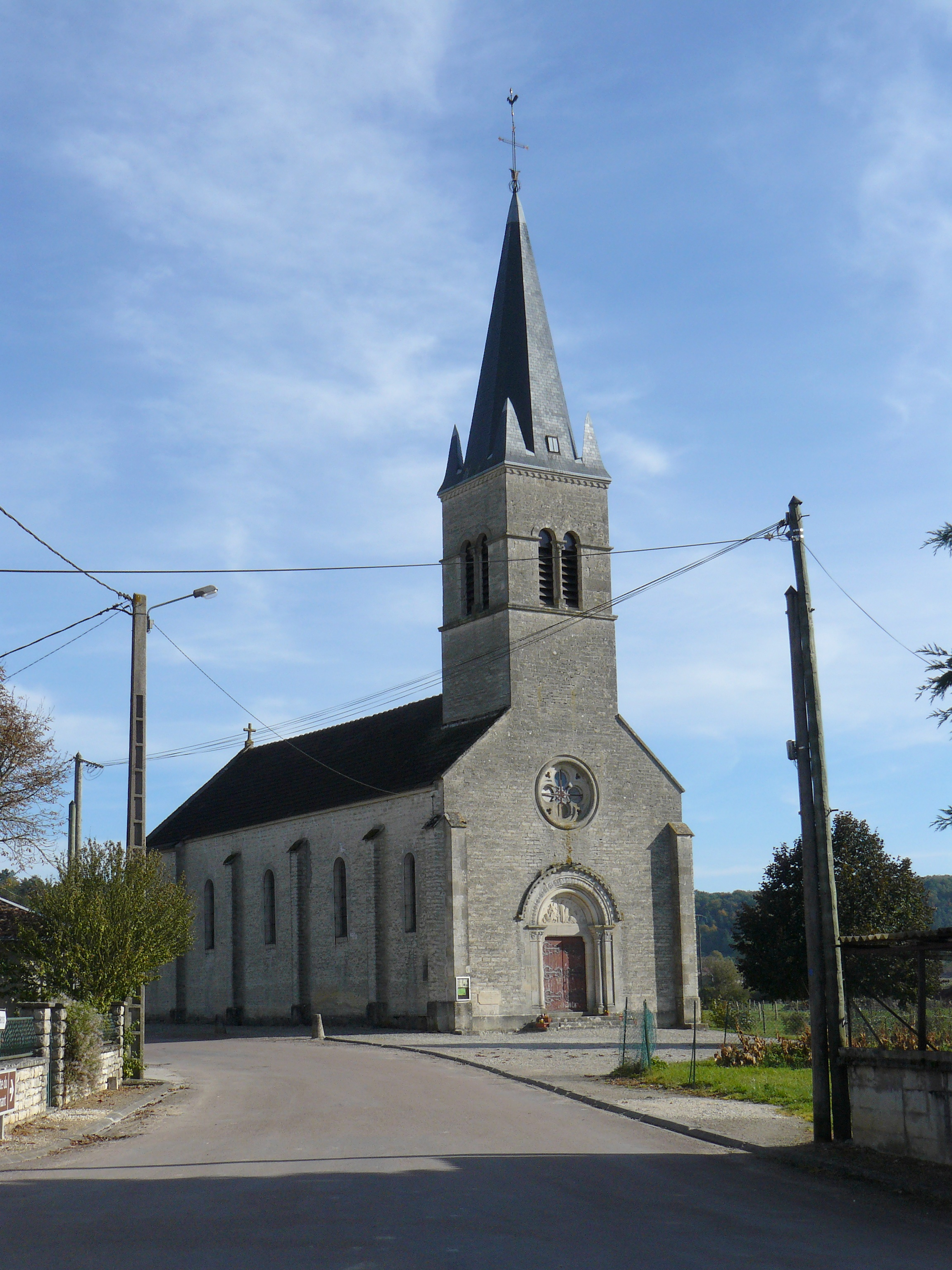
- The church in Obtrée

- Coat of arms
- Location of Obtrée
- Location within France Location within Bourgogne-Franche-Comté
- Coordinates: 47°55′20″N 4°33′24″E
- Country: France
- Region: Bourgogne-Franche-Comté
- Department: Côte-d'Or
- Arrondissement: Montbard
- Canton: Châtillon-sur-Seine
- Intercommunality: Pays Châtillonnais

Government
  - Mayor (2020–2026): Philippe Lefebvre
- Area^{1}: 5.17 km^{2} (2.00 sq mi)
- Elevation: 207 m (679 ft)
- Highest elevation: 347 m (1,138 ft)
- Lowest elevation: 197 m (646 ft)
- Population (2023): 81
  - Density: 16/km^{2} (41/sq mi)
- Time zone: UTC+01:00 (CET)
  - Summer (DST): UTC+02:00 (CEST)
- INSEE/Postal code: 21465 /21400
- ^{1} French Land Register data, which excludes lakes, ponds, glaciers > 1 km^{2} (0.386 sq mi or 247 acres) and river estuaries.

Obtrée (French pronunciation: [ɔptʁe]) is a commune in the Côte-d'Or department in eastern France.

== Population ==
Historical population
Year	Pop.	±% p.a.
1968	87	—
1975	83	−0.67%
1982	85	+0.34%
1990	85	+0.00%
1999	89	+0.51%
2007	71	−2.78%
2012	76	+1.37%
2017	76	+0.00%
2023	81	+1.07%
Source: INSEE

== See also ==
- Communes of the Côte-d'Or department
