= Puits =

- Commune
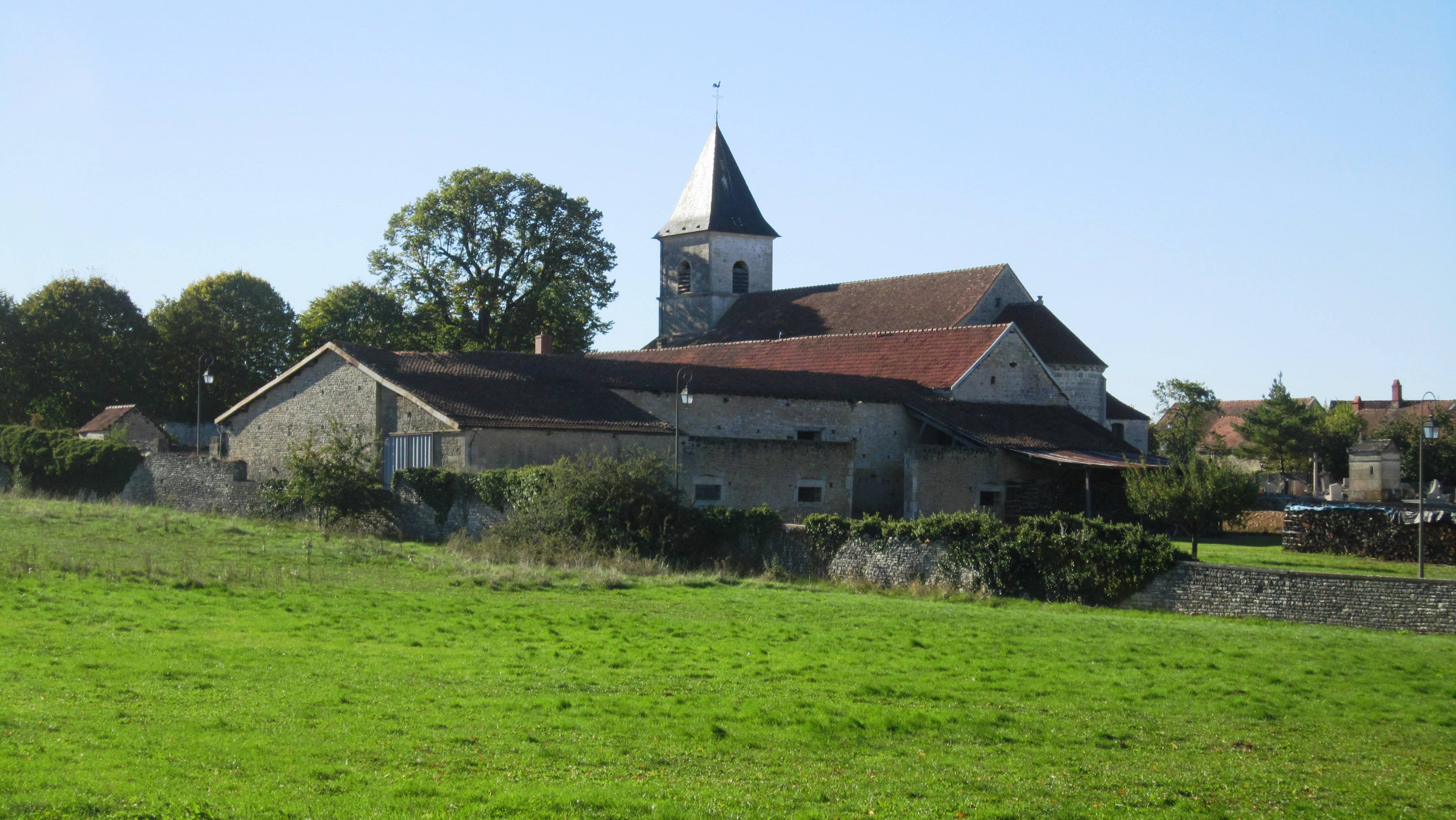
- The church in Puits

- Coat of arms
- Location of Puits
- Location within France Location within Bourgogne-Franche-Comté
- Coordinates: 47°44′05″N 4°27′39″E
- Country: France
- Region: Bourgogne-Franche-Comté
- Department: Côte-d'Or
- Arrondissement: Montbard
- Canton: Châtillon-sur-Seine

Government
  - Mayor (2020–2026): Benoît de Valous
- Area^{1}: 20.79 km^{2} (8.03 sq mi)
- Elevation: 305 m (1,001 ft)
- Highest elevation: 353 m (1,158 ft)
- Lowest elevation: 275 m (902 ft)
- Population (2023): 137
  - Density: 6.59/km^{2} (17.1/sq mi)
- Time zone: UTC+01:00 (CET)
  - Summer (DST): UTC+02:00 (CEST)
- INSEE/Postal code: 21511 /21400
- ^{1} French Land Register data, which excludes lakes, ponds, glaciers > 1 km^{2} (0.386 sq mi or 247 acres) and river estuaries.

Puits (French pronunciation: [pɥi]) is a commune in the Côte-d'Or department in eastern France.

== Population ==
Historical population
Year	Pop.	±% p.a.
1968	178	—
1975	168	−0.82%
1982	141	−2.47%
1990	138	−0.27%
1999	136	−0.16%
2007	141	+0.45%
2012	135	−0.87%
2017	122	−2.00%
2023	137	+1.95%
Source: INSEE

== See also ==
- Communes of the Côte-d'Or department
