= Minot, Côte-d'Or =

Minot
- Commune
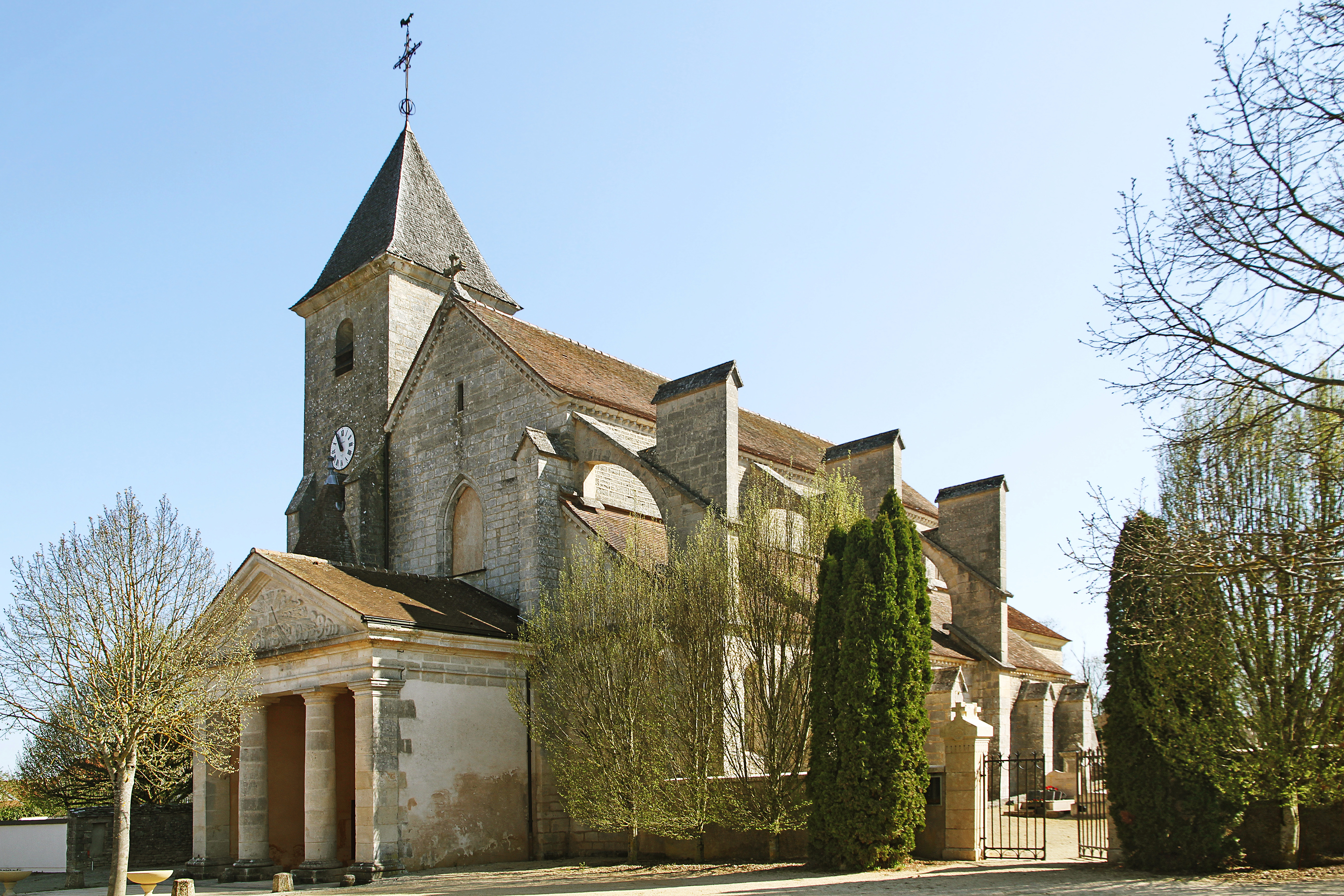
- The church in Minot

- Coat of arms
- Location of Minot
- Location within France Location within Bourgogne-Franche-Comté
- Coordinates: 47°40′13″N 4°52′37″E
- Country: France
- Region: Bourgogne-Franche-Comté
- Department: Côte-d'Or
- Arrondissement: Montbard
- Canton: Châtillon-sur-Seine

Government
  - Mayor (2020–2026): Frédérique Voizeux
- Area^{1}: 36.18 km^{2} (13.97 sq mi)
- Elevation: 437 m (1,434 ft)
- Highest elevation: 504 m (1,654 ft)
- Lowest elevation: 363 m (1,191 ft)
- Population (2023): 186
  - Density: 5.14/km^{2} (13.3/sq mi)
- Time zone: UTC+01:00 (CET)
  - Summer (DST): UTC+02:00 (CEST)
- INSEE/Postal code: 21415 /21510
- ^{1} French Land Register data, which excludes lakes, ponds, glaciers > 1 km^{2} (0.386 sq mi or 247 acres) and river estuaries.

Minot (French pronunciation: [mino]) is a commune in the Côte-d'Or department in Bourgogne-Franche-Comté in eastern France.

== Population ==
Historical population
Year	Pop.	±% p.a.
1968	359	—
1975	349	−0.40%
1982	285	−2.85%
1990	240	−2.13%
1999	229	−0.52%
2007	241	+0.64%
2012	210	−2.72%
2017	180	−3.04%
2023	186	+0.55%
Source: INSEE

== See also ==
- Communes of the Côte-d'Or département
