= Beneuvre =

- Commune
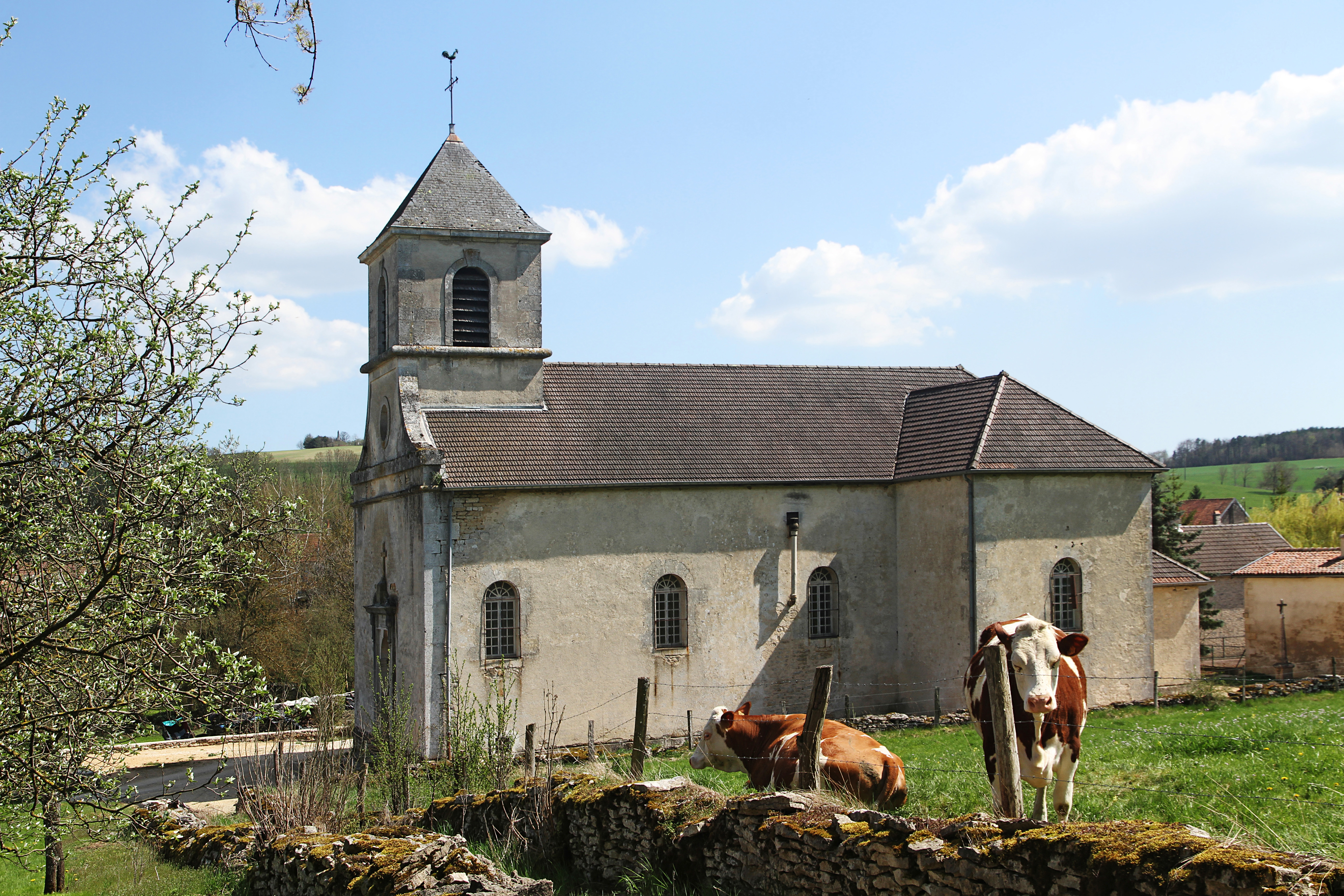
- The church in Beneuvre

- Coat of arms
- Location of Beneuvre
- Location within France Location within Bourgogne-Franche-Comté
- Coordinates: 47°41′33″N 4°56′37″E
- Country: France
- Region: Bourgogne-Franche-Comté
- Department: Côte-d'Or
- Arrondissement: Montbard
- Canton: Châtillon-sur-Seine
- Intercommunality: Pays Châtillonnais

Government
  - Mayor (2020–2026): Alain Gallimard
- Area^{1}: 15.40 km^{2} (5.95 sq mi)
- Elevation: 430 m (1,410 ft)
- Highest elevation: 511 m (1,677 ft)
- Lowest elevation: 375 m (1,230 ft)
- Population (2023): 94
  - Density: 6.1/km^{2} (16/sq mi)
- Time zone: UTC+01:00 (CET)
  - Summer (DST): UTC+02:00 (CEST)
- INSEE/Postal code: 21063 /21290
- ^{1} French Land Register data, which excludes lakes, ponds, glaciers > 1 km^{2} (0.386 sq mi or 247 acres) and river estuaries.

Beneuvre (French pronunciation: [bənœvʁ]) is a commune in the Côte-d'Or department in eastern France.

== Population ==
Historical population
Year	Pop.	±% p.a.
1968	119	—
1975	108	−1.38%
1982	120	+1.52%
1990	94	−3.01%
1999	101	+0.80%
2007	96	−0.63%
2012	105	+1.81%
2017	91	−2.82%
2023	94	+0.54%
Source: INSEE

== See also ==
- Communes of the Côte-d'Or department
