= Louesme =

- Commune
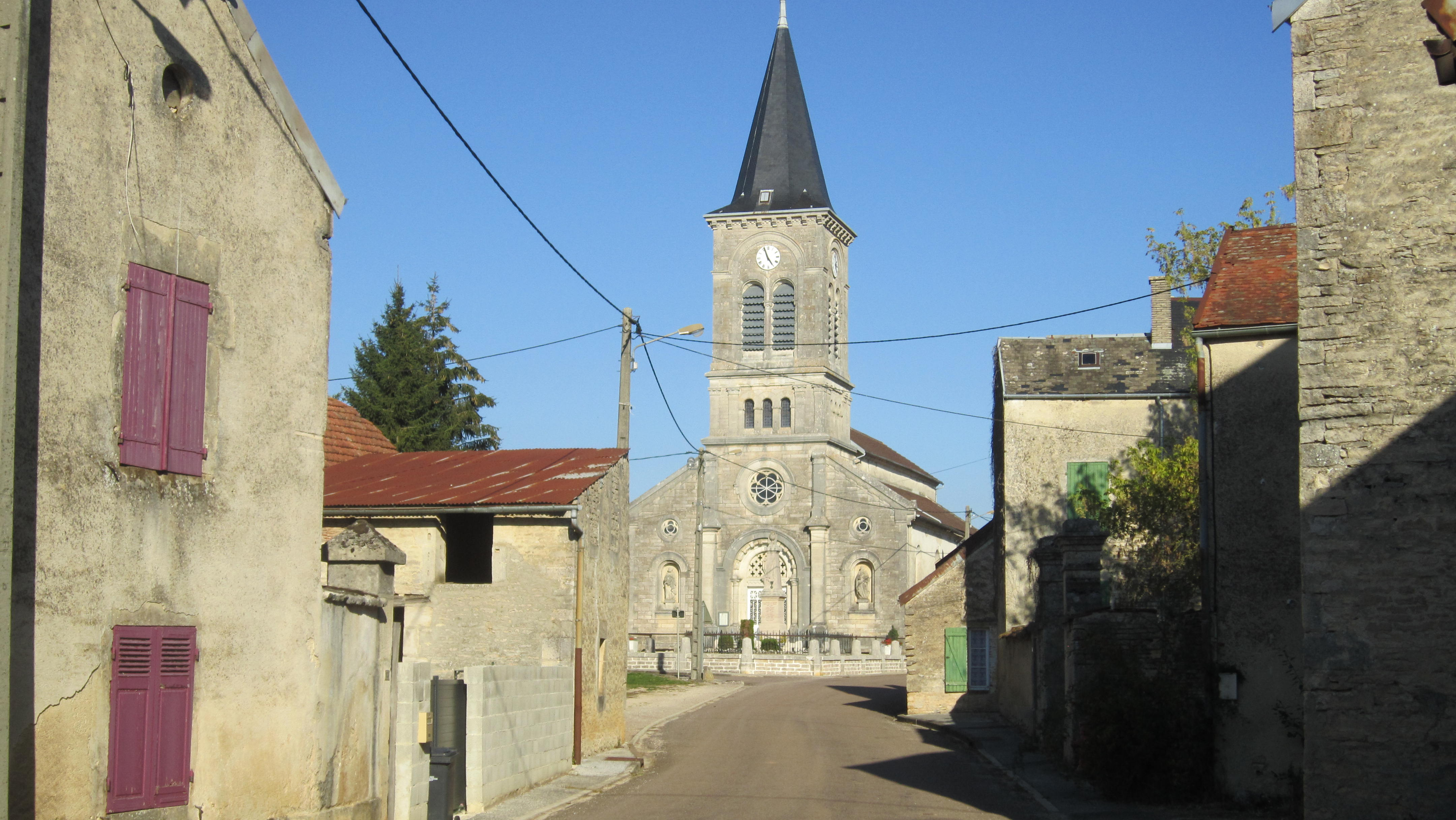
- The church in Louesme

- Coat of arms
- Location of Louesme
- Location within France Location within Bourgogne-Franche-Comté
- Coordinates: 47°53′51″N 4°45′34″E
- Country: France
- Region: Bourgogne-Franche-Comté
- Department: Côte-d'Or
- Arrondissement: Montbard
- Canton: Châtillon-sur-Seine
- Intercommunality: Pays Châtillonnais

Government
  - Mayor (2020–2026): Alain Dosso
- Area^{1}: 18.92 km^{2} (7.31 sq mi)
- Elevation: 300 m (980 ft)
- Highest elevation: 377 m (1,237 ft)
- Lowest elevation: 250 m (820 ft)
- Population (2023): 111
  - Density: 5.87/km^{2} (15.2/sq mi)
- Time zone: UTC+01:00 (CET)
  - Summer (DST): UTC+02:00 (CEST)
- INSEE/Postal code: 21357 /21520
- ^{1} French Land Register data, which excludes lakes, ponds, glaciers > 1 km^{2} (0.386 sq mi or 247 acres) and river estuaries.

Louesme (French pronunciation: [lwɛm]) is a commune in the Côte-d'Or department in eastern France.

== Population ==
Historical population
Year	Pop.	±% p.a.
1968	155	—
1975	137	−1.75%
1982	124	−1.41%
1990	121	−0.31%
1999	111	−0.95%
2007	115	+0.44%
2012	108	−1.25%
2017	106	−0.37%
2023	111	+0.77%
Source: INSEE

== See also ==
- Communes of the Côte-d'Or department
