= Mosson, Côte-d'Or =

Mosson
- Commune
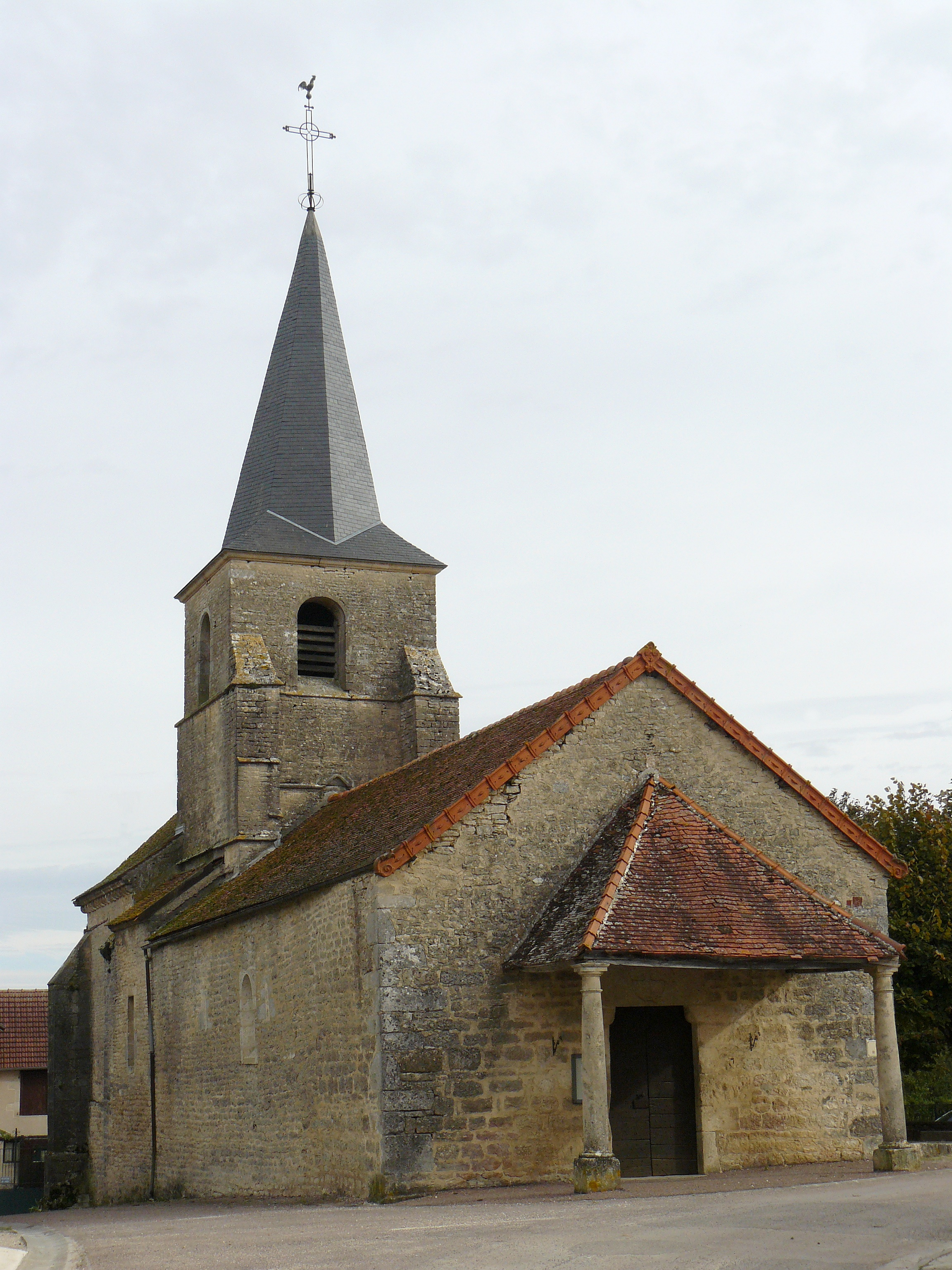
- The church in Mosson

- Coat of arms
- Location of Mosson
- Location within France Location within Bourgogne-Franche-Comté
- Coordinates: 47°55′09″N 4°37′47″E
- Country: France
- Region: Bourgogne-Franche-Comté
- Department: Côte-d'Or
- Arrondissement: Montbard
- Canton: Châtillon-sur-Seine
- Intercommunality: Pays Châtillonnais

Government
  - Mayor (2020–2026): Grégory Hanuszek
- Area^{1}: 7.41 km^{2} (2.86 sq mi)
- Elevation: 240 m (790 ft)
- Highest elevation: 337 m (1,106 ft)
- Lowest elevation: 228 m (748 ft)
- Population (2023): 70
  - Density: 9.4/km^{2} (24/sq mi)
- Time zone: UTC+01:00 (CET)
  - Summer (DST): UTC+02:00 (CEST)
- INSEE/Postal code: 21444 /21400
- ^{1} French Land Register data, which excludes lakes, ponds, glaciers > 1 km^{2} (0.386 sq mi or 247 acres) and river estuaries.

Mosson (French pronunciation: [mɔsɔ̃]) is a commune in the Côte-d'Or department in eastern France.

== Population ==
Historical population
Year	Pop.	±% p.a.
1968	88	—
1975	87	−0.16%
1982	84	−0.50%
1990	81	−0.45%
1999	87	+0.80%
2007	87	+0.00%
2012	84	−0.70%
2017	72	−3.04%
2023	70	−0.47%
Source: INSEE

== See also ==
- Communes of the Côte-d'Or department
