= Marcenay =

- Commune
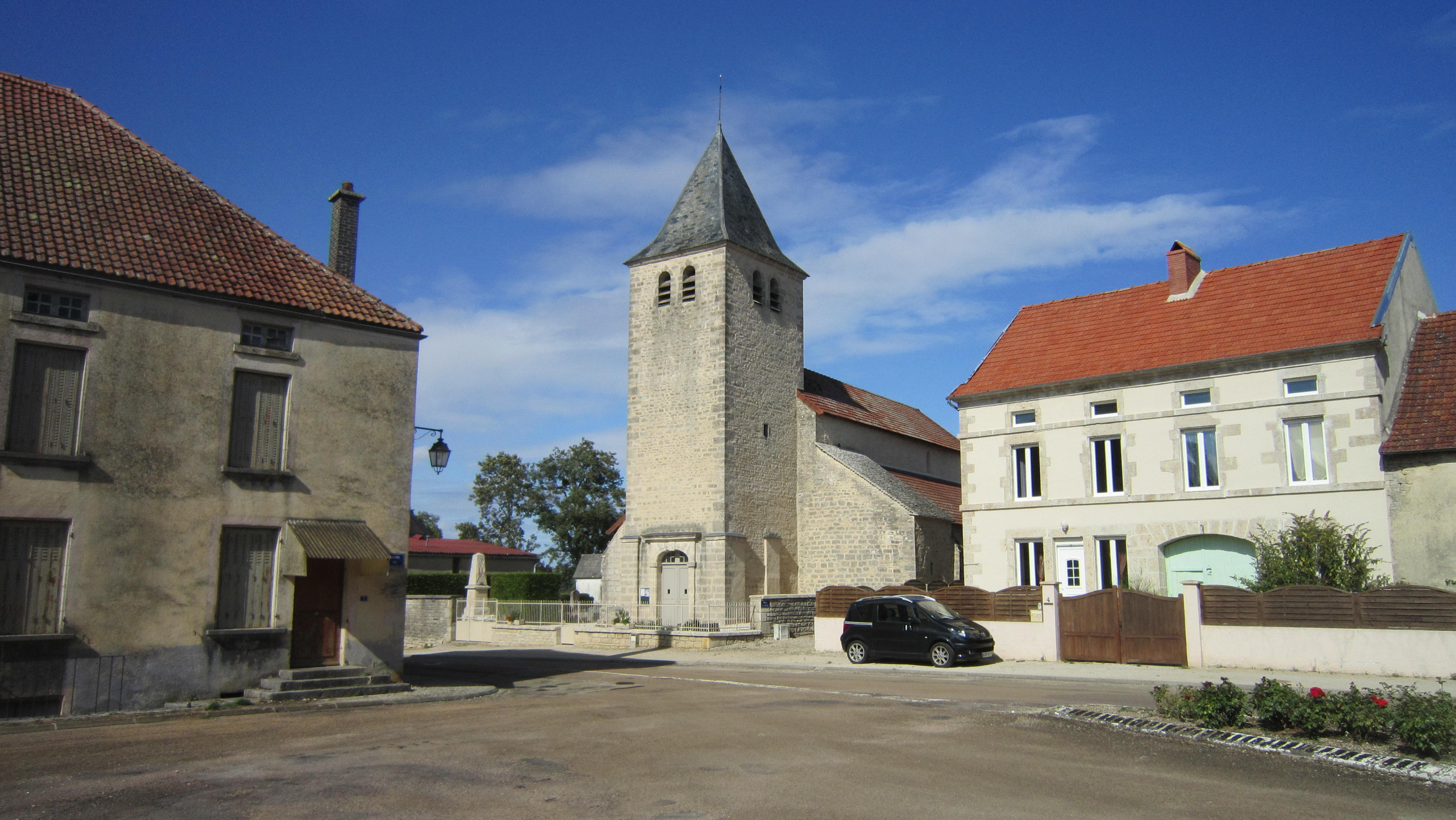
- The church in Marcenay

- Coat of arms
- Location of Marcenay
- Location within France Location within Bourgogne-Franche-Comté
- Coordinates: 47°51′49″N 4°24′16″E
- Country: France
- Region: Bourgogne-Franche-Comté
- Department: Côte-d'Or
- Arrondissement: Montbard
- Canton: Châtillon-sur-Seine

Government
  - Mayor (2020–2026): Didier Bapt
- Area^{1}: 9.49 km^{2} (3.66 sq mi)
- Elevation: 223 m (732 ft)
- Highest elevation: 273 m (896 ft)
- Lowest elevation: 206 m (676 ft)
- Population (2023): 108
  - Density: 11.4/km^{2} (29.5/sq mi)
- Time zone: UTC+01:00 (CET)
  - Summer (DST): UTC+02:00 (CEST)
- INSEE/Postal code: 21378 /21330
- ^{1} French Land Register data, which excludes lakes, ponds, glaciers > 1 km^{2} (0.386 sq mi or 247 acres) and river estuaries.

Marcenay (French pronunciation: [maʁsənɛ]) is a commune in the Côte-d'Or department in eastern France.

== Population ==
Historical population
Year	Pop.	±% p.a.
1968	188	—
1975	149	−3.27%
1982	145	−0.39%
1990	130	−1.36%
1999	116	−1.26%
2007	114	−0.22%
2012	107	−1.26%
2017	98	−1.74%
2023	108	+1.63%
Source: INSEE

== See also ==
- Communes of the Côte-d'Or department
