= Channay =

- Commune
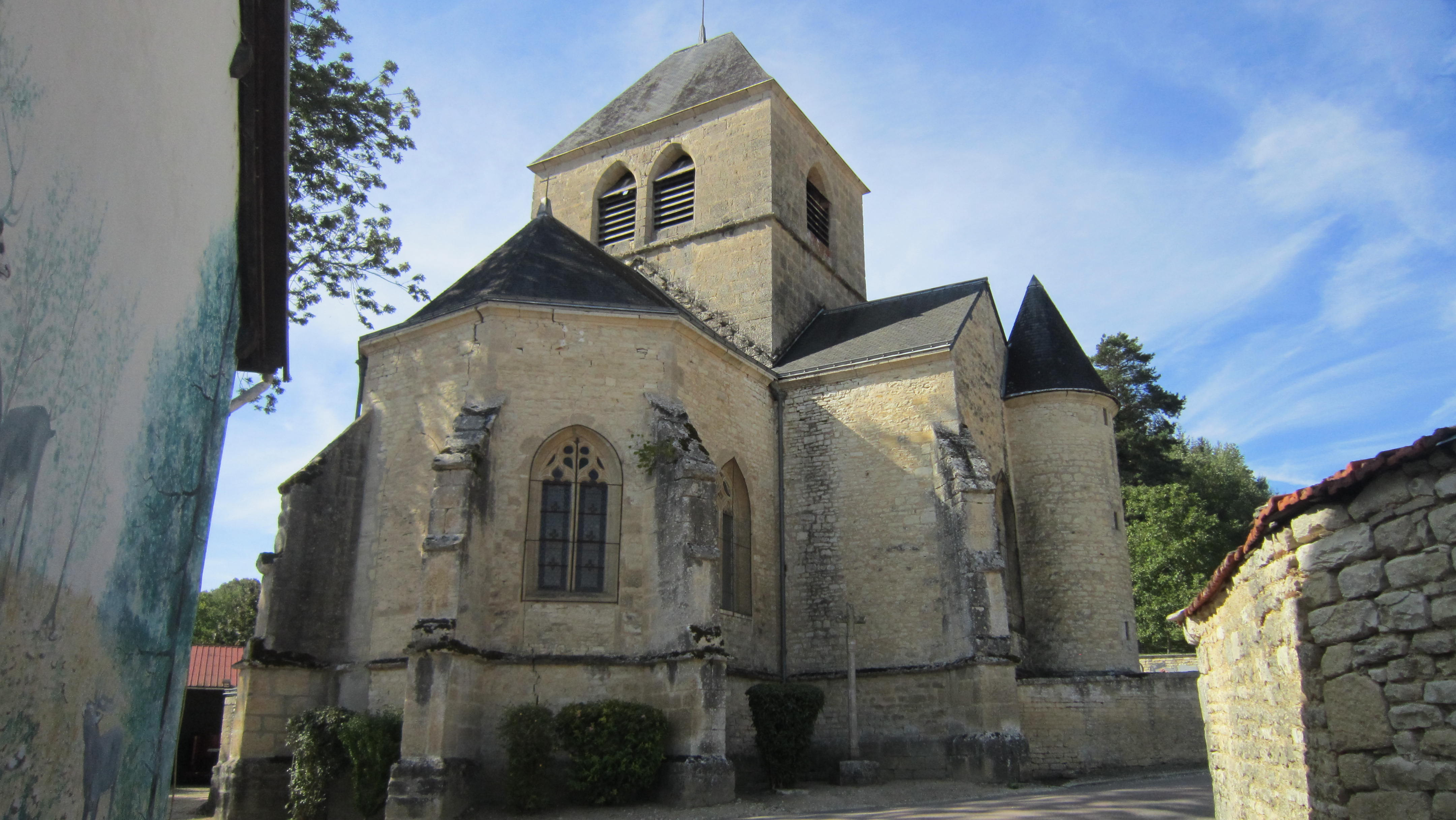
- The church in Channay
- Location of Channay
- Location within France Location within Bourgogne-Franche-Comté
- Coordinates: 47°52′59″N 4°19′57″E
- Country: France
- Region: Bourgogne-Franche-Comté
- Department: Côte-d'Or
- Arrondissement: Montbard
- Canton: Châtillon-sur-Seine

Government
  - Mayor (2020–2026): Hubert Collin
- Area^{1}: 13.33 km^{2} (5.15 sq mi)
- Elevation: 208 m (682 ft)
- Highest elevation: 288 m (945 ft)
- Lowest elevation: 197 m (646 ft)
- Population (2023): 58
  - Density: 4.4/km^{2} (11/sq mi)
- Time zone: UTC+01:00 (CET)
  - Summer (DST): UTC+02:00 (CEST)
- INSEE/Postal code: 21143 /21330
- ^{1} French Land Register data, which excludes lakes, ponds, glaciers > 1 km^{2} (0.386 sq mi or 247 acres) and river estuaries.

Channay (French pronunciation: [ʃanɛ]) is a commune in the Côte-d'Or department in eastern France.

== Population ==
Historical population
Year	Pop.	±% p.a.
1968	106	—
1975	74	−5.00%
1982	68	−1.20%
1990	70	+0.36%
1999	76	+0.92%
2007	66	−1.75%
2012	62	−1.24%
2017	64	+0.64%
2023	58	−1.63%
Source: INSEE

== See also ==
- Communes of the Côte-d'Or department
