= Arrondissement of Montbard =

Coordinates: 47°37′25″N 4°20′16″E

Montbard
- Arrondissement
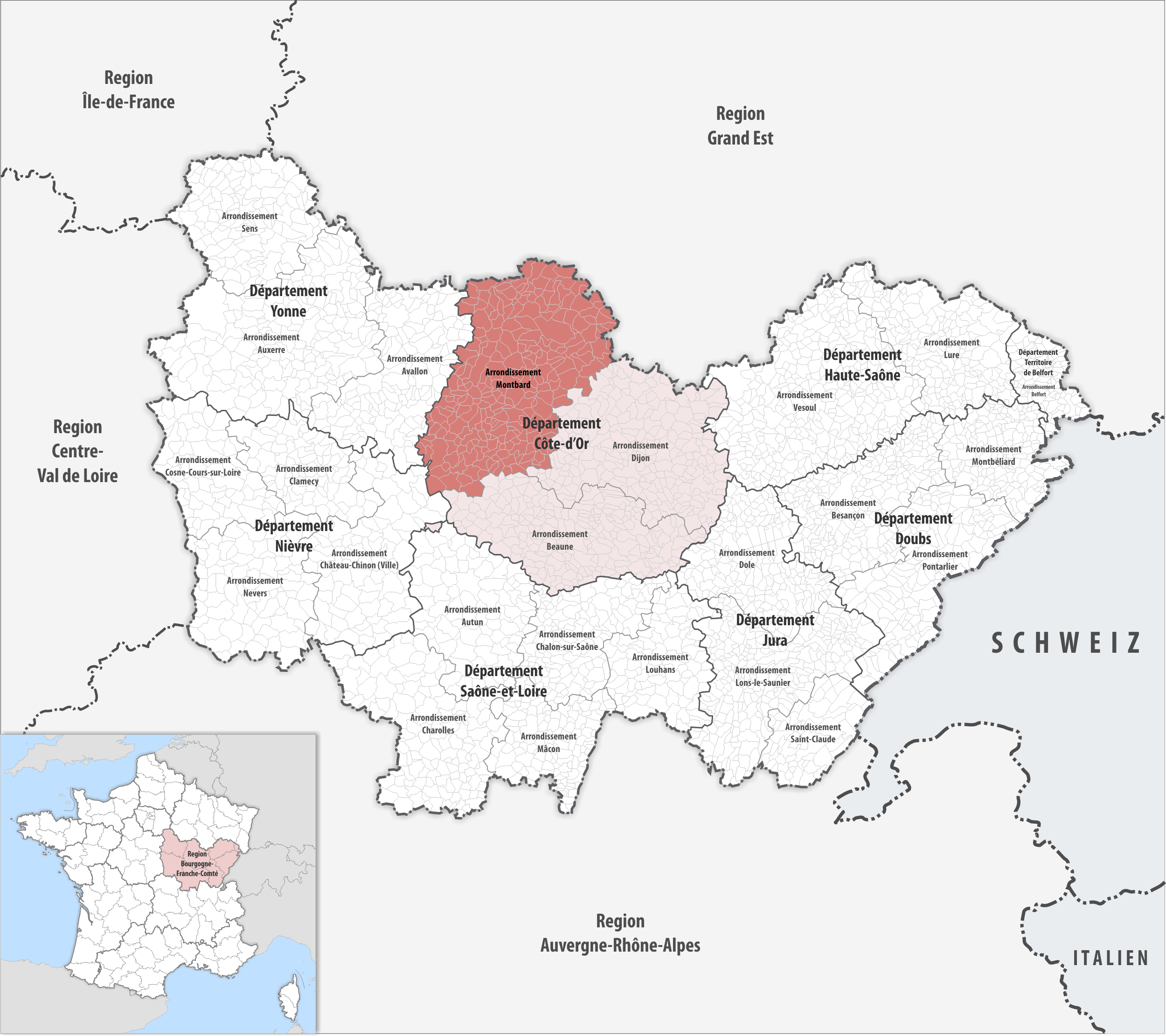
- Location within the region Bourgogne-Franche-Comté
- Country: France
- Region: Bourgogne-Franche-Comté
- Department: Côte-d'Or
- No. of communes: {{{nbcomm}}}
- Area: 3,595.9 km^{2} (1,388.4 sq mi)
- Population (2023): 57,574
  - Density: 16.011/km^{2} (41.468/sq mi)
- INSEE code: 213

The arrondissement of Montbard is an arrondissement of France in the Côte-d'Or department in the Bourgogne-Franche-Comté region. It has 252 communes. Its population is 57,974 (2021), and its area is 3,595.9 km^{2} (1,388.4 sq mi).

== Composition ==
The communes of the arrondissement of Montbard, and their INSEE codes, are:

1. Aignay-le-Duc (21004)
2. Aisey-sur-Seine (21006)
3. Aisy-sous-Thil (21007)
4. Alise-Sainte-Reine (21008)
5. Ampilly-les-Bordes (21011)
6. Ampilly-le-Sec (21012)
7. Arnay-sous-Vitteaux (21024)
8. Arrans (21025)
9. Asnières-en-Montagne (21026)
10. Athie (21029)
11. Autricourt (21034)
12. Avosnes (21040)
13. Baigneux-les-Juifs (21043)
14. Balot (21044)
15. Bard-lès-Époisses (21047)
16. Beaulieu (21052)
17. Beaunotte (21055)
18. Belan-sur-Ource (21058)
19. Bellenod-sur-Seine (21061)
20. Beneuvre (21063)
21. Benoisey (21064)
22. Beurizot (21069)
23. Billy-lès-Chanceaux (21075)
24. Bissey-la-Côte (21077)
25. Bissey-la-Pierre (21078)
26. Boudreville (21090)
27. Bouix (21093)
28. Boussey (21097)
29. Boux-sous-Salmaise (21098)
30. Brain (21100)
31. Braux (21101)
32. Brémur-et-Vaurois (21104)
33. Brianny (21108)
34. Brion-sur-Ource (21109)
35. Buffon (21114)
36. Buncey (21115)
37. Bure-les-Templiers (21116)
38. Busseaut (21117)
39. Bussy-le-Grand (21122)
40. Buxerolles (21123)
41. Cérilly (21125)
42. Chambain (21129)
43. Chamesson (21134)
44. Champ-d'Oiseau (21137)
45. Champeau-en-Morvan (21139)
46. Champrenault (21141)
47. Channay (21143)
48. Charencey (21144)
49. Charigny (21145)
50. Charny (21147)
51. Charrey-sur-Seine (21149)
52. Chassey (21151)
53. Châtillon-sur-Seine (21154)
54. Chaugey (21157)
55. La Chaume (21159)
56. Chaume-lès-Baigneux (21160)
57. Chaumont-le-Bois (21161)
58. Chemin-d'Aisey (21165)
59. Chevannay (21168)
60. Clamerey (21177)
61. Corpoyer-la-Chapelle (21197)
62. Corrombles (21198)
63. Corsaint (21199)
64. Coulmier-le-Sec (21201)
65. Courban (21202)
66. Courcelles-Frémoy (21203)
67. Courcelles-lès-Montbard (21204)
68. Courcelles-lès-Semur (21205)
69. Crépand (21212)
70. Dampierre-en-Montagne (21224)
71. Darcey (21226)
72. Dompierre-en-Morvan (21232)
73. Duesme (21235)
74. Échalot (21237)
75. Époisses (21247)
76. Éringes (21248)
77. Essarois (21250)
78. Étais (21252)
79. Étalante (21253)
80. Étormay (21257)
81. Étrochey (21258)
82. Fain-lès-Montbard (21259)
83. Fain-lès-Moutiers (21260)
84. Faverolles-lès-Lucey (21262)
85. Flavigny-sur-Ozerain (21271)
86. Fontaines-en-Duesmois (21276)
87. Fontaines-les-Sèches (21279)
88. Fontangy (21280)
89. Forléans (21282)
90. Fresnes (21287)
91. Frôlois (21288)
92. Genay (21291)
93. Gevrolles (21296)
94. Gissey-le-Vieil (21298)
95. Gissey-sous-Flavigny (21299)
96. Gomméville (21302)
97. Les Goulles (21303)
98. Grancey-sur-Ource (21305)
99. Grésigny-Sainte-Reine (21307)
100. Grignon (21308)
101. Griselles (21309)
102. Gurgy-la-Ville (21312)
103. Gurgy-le-Château (21313)
104. Hauteroche (21314)
105. Jailly-les-Moulins (21321)
106. Jeux-lès-Bard (21324)
107. Jours-lès-Baigneux (21326)
108. Juillenay (21328)
109. Juilly (21329)
110. Lacour-d'Arcenay (21335)
111. Laignes (21336)
112. Lantilly (21341)
113. Larrey (21343)
114. Leuglay (21346)
115. Lignerolles (21350)
116. Louesme (21357)
117. Lucenay-le-Duc (21358)
118. Lucey (21359)
119. Magny-Lambert (21364)
120. Magny-la-Ville (21365)
121. Maisey-le-Duc (21372)
122. Marcellois (21377)
123. Marcenay (21378)
124. Marcigny-sous-Thil (21380)
125. Marcilly-et-Dracy (21381)
126. Marigny-le-Cahouët (21386)
127. Marmagne (21389)
128. Massingy (21393)
129. Massingy-lès-Semur (21394)
130. Massingy-lès-Vitteaux (21395)
131. Mauvilly (21396)
132. Menesble (21402)
133. Ménétreux-le-Pitois (21404)
134. Meulson (21410)
135. Millery (21413)
136. Minot (21415)
137. Missery (21417)
138. Moitron (21418)
139. Molesme (21419)
140. Molphey (21422)
141. Montbard (21425)
142. Montberthault (21426)
143. Montigny-Montfort (21429)
144. Montigny-Saint-Barthélemy (21430)
145. Montigny-sur-Armançon (21431)
146. Montigny-sur-Aube (21432)
147. Montlay-en-Auxois (21434)
148. Montliot-et-Courcelles (21435)
149. Montmoyen (21438)
150. Mosson (21444)
151. La Motte-Ternant (21445)
152. Moutiers-Saint-Jean (21446)
153. Mussy-la-Fosse (21448)
154. Nan-sous-Thil (21449)
155. Nesle-et-Massoult (21451)
156. Nicey (21454)
157. Nod-sur-Seine (21455)
158. Nogent-lès-Montbard (21456)
159. Noidan (21457)
160. Noiron-sur-Seine (21460)
161. Normier (21463)
162. Obtrée (21465)
163. Oigny (21466)
164. Origny (21470)
165. Orret (21471)
166. Planay (21484)
167. Poinçon-lès-Larrey (21488)
168. Poiseul-la-Ville-et-Laperrière (21490)
169. Pont-et-Massène (21497)
170. Posanges (21498)
171. Pothières (21499)
172. Pouillenay (21500)
173. Précy-sous-Thil (21505)
174. Prusly-sur-Ource (21510)
175. Puits (21511)
176. Quemigny-sur-Seine (21514)
177. Quincerot (21516)
178. Quincy-le-Vicomte (21518)
179. Recey-sur-Ource (21519)
180. Riel-les-Eaux (21524)
181. La Roche-en-Brenil (21525)
182. Rochefort-sur-Brévon (21526)
183. La Roche-Vanneau (21528)
184. Roilly (21529)
185. Rougemont (21530)
186. Rouvray (21531)
187. Saffres (21537)
188. Saint-Andeux (21538)
189. Saint-Broing-les-Moines (21543)
190. Saint-Didier (21546)
191. Sainte-Colombe-en-Auxois (21544)
192. Sainte-Colombe-sur-Seine (21545)
193. Saint-Euphrône (21547)
194. Saint-Germain-de-Modéon (21548)
195. Saint-Germain-le-Rocheux (21549)
196. Saint-Germain-lès-Senailly (21550)
197. Saint-Hélier (21552)
198. Saint-Marc-sur-Seine (21557)
199. Saint-Mesmin (21563)
200. Saint-Rémy (21568)
201. Saint-Thibault (21576)
202. Salmaise (21580)
203. Saulieu (21584)
204. Savoisy (21594)
205. Seigny (21598)
206. Semond (21602)
207. Semur-en-Auxois (21603)
208. Senailly (21604)
209. Sincey-lès-Rouvray (21608)
210. Souhey (21612)
211. Source-Seine (21551)
212. Soussey-sur-Brionne (21613)
213. Terrefondrée (21626)
214. Thenissey (21627)
215. Thoires (21628)
216. Thoisy-la-Berchère (21629)
217. Thorey-sous-Charny (21633)
218. Thoste (21635)
219. Torcy-et-Pouligny (21640)
220. Touillon (21641)
221. Toutry (21642)
222. Uncey-le-Franc (21649)
223. Le Val-Larrey (21272)
224. Vannaire (21653)
225. Vanvey (21655)
226. Velogny (21662)
227. Venarey-les-Laumes (21663)
228. Verdonnet (21664)
229. Verrey-sous-Salmaise (21670)
230. Vertault (21671)
231. Vesvres (21672)
232. Veuxhaulles-sur-Aube (21674)
233. Vic-de-Chassenay (21676)
234. Vic-sous-Thil (21678)
235. Vieux-Château (21681)
236. Villaines-en-Duesmois (21685)
237. Villaines-les-Prévôtes (21686)
238. Villargoix (21687)
239. Villars-et-Villenotte (21689)
240. Villeberny (21690)
241. Villedieu (21693)
242. Villeferry (21694)
243. La Villeneuve-les-Convers (21695)
244. Villeneuve-sous-Charigny (21696)
245. Villers-Patras (21700)
246. Villiers-le-Duc (21704)
247. Villotte-sur-Ource (21706)
248. Villy-en-Auxois (21707)
249. Viserny (21709)
250. Vitteaux (21710)
251. Vix (21711)
252. Voulaines-les-Templiers (21717)

== History ==
The arrondissement of Semur-en-Auxois was created in 1800. The subprefecture was moved to Montbard in 1926.

As a result of the reorganisation of the cantons of France which came into effect in 2015, the borders of the cantons are no longer related to the borders of the arrondissements. The cantons of the arrondissement of Montbard were, as of January 2015:

1. Aignay-le-Duc
2. Baigneux-les-Juifs
3. Châtillon-sur-Seine
4. Laignes
5. Montbard
6. Montigny-sur-Aube
7. Précy-sous-Thil
8. Recey-sur-Ource
9. Saulieu
10. Semur-en-Auxois
11. Venarey-les-Laumes
12. Vitteaux
