= Lignerolles, Côte-d'Or =

Lignerolles
- Commune
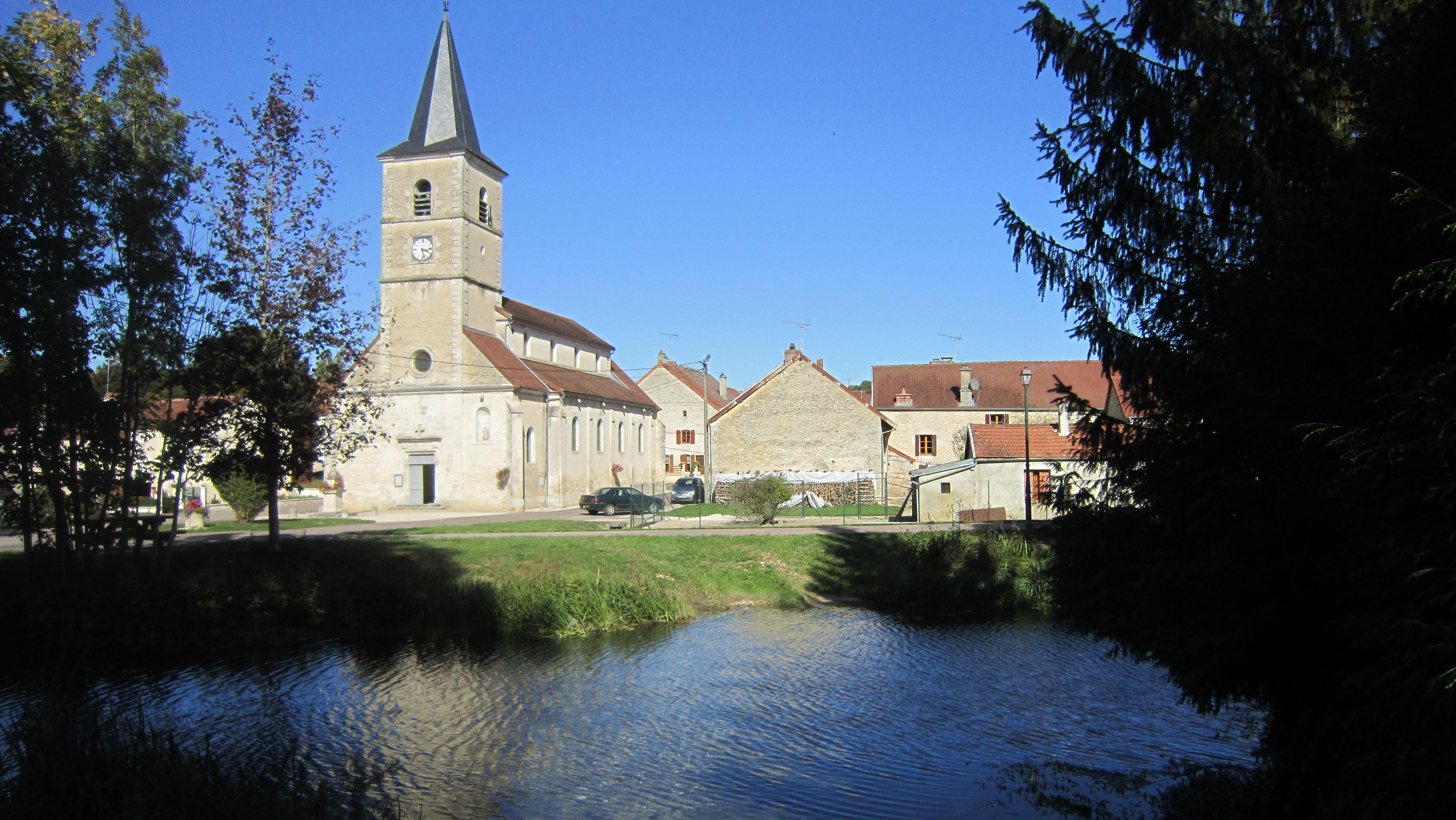
- The church and surroundings in Lignerolles

- Coat of arms
- Location of Lignerolles
- Location within France Location within Bourgogne-Franche-Comté
- Coordinates: 47°54′09″N 4°53′21″E
- Country: France
- Region: Bourgogne-Franche-Comté
- Department: Côte-d'Or
- Arrondissement: Montbard
- Canton: Châtillon-sur-Seine
- Intercommunality: Pays Châtillonnais

Government
  - Mayor (2020–2026): François Leblond
- Area^{1}: 13.54 km^{2} (5.23 sq mi)
- Elevation: 360 m (1,180 ft)
- Highest elevation: 373 m (1,224 ft)
- Lowest elevation: 253 m (830 ft)
- Population (2023): 55
  - Density: 4.1/km^{2} (11/sq mi)
- Demonym(s): Lignerollois, Lignerolloises
- Time zone: UTC+01:00 (CET)
  - Summer (DST): UTC+02:00 (CEST)
- INSEE/Postal code: 21350 /21520
- ^{1} French Land Register data, which excludes lakes, ponds, glaciers > 1 km^{2} (0.386 sq mi or 247 acres) and river estuaries.

Lignerolles (French pronunciation: [liɲʁɔl]) is a commune in the Côte-d'Or department in eastern France.

== Population ==
Historical population
Year	Pop.	±% p.a.
1968	63	—
1975	70	+1.52%
1982	62	−1.72%
1990	48	−3.15%
1999	53	+1.11%
2007	54	+0.23%
2012	51	−1.14%
2017	50	−0.40%
2023	55	+1.60%
Source: INSEE

== See also ==
- Communes of the Côte-d'Or department
