= Veuxhaulles-sur-Aube =

- Commune
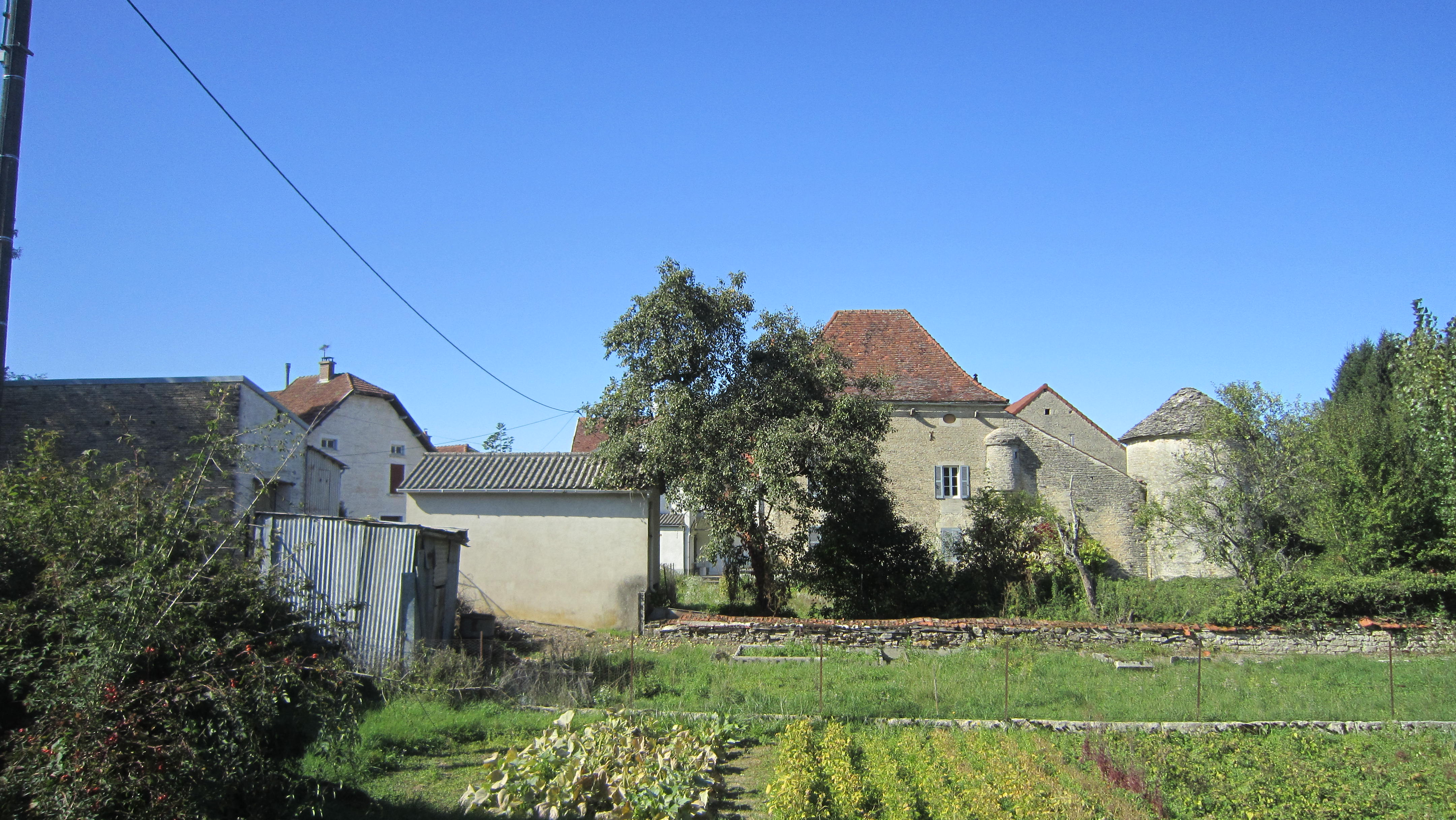
- A general view of Veuxhaulles-sur-Aube

- Coat of arms
- Location of Veuxhaulles-sur-Aube
- Location within France Location within Bourgogne-Franche-Comté
- Coordinates: 47°56′44″N 4°48′10″E
- Country: France
- Region: Bourgogne-Franche-Comté
- Department: Côte-d'Or
- Arrondissement: Montbard
- Canton: Châtillon-sur-Seine
- Intercommunality: Pays Châtillonnais

Government
  - Mayor (2020–2026): Christophe Viardot
- Area^{1}: 19.24 km^{2} (7.43 sq mi)
- Elevation: 240 m (790 ft)
- Highest elevation: 348 m (1,142 ft)
- Lowest elevation: 230 m (750 ft)
- Population (2023): 216
  - Density: 11.2/km^{2} (29.1/sq mi)
- Time zone: UTC+01:00 (CET)
  - Summer (DST): UTC+02:00 (CEST)
- INSEE/Postal code: 21674 /21520
- ^{1} French Land Register data, which excludes lakes, ponds, glaciers > 1 km^{2} (0.386 sq mi or 247 acres) and river estuaries.

Veuxhaulles-sur-Aube (French pronunciation: [vøsol syʁ ob], literally Veuxhaulles on Aube) is a commune in the Côte-d'Or department in eastern France, close to the border with Haute-Marne.

== Population ==
Historical population
Year	Pop.	±% p.a.
1968	480	—
1975	385	−3.10%
1982	372	−0.49%
1990	305	−2.45%
1999	259	−1.80%
2007	229	−1.53%
2012	231	+0.17%
2017	207	−2.17%
2023	216	+0.71%
Source: INSEE

== See also ==
- Communes of the Côte-d'Or department
