= Menesble =

- Commune
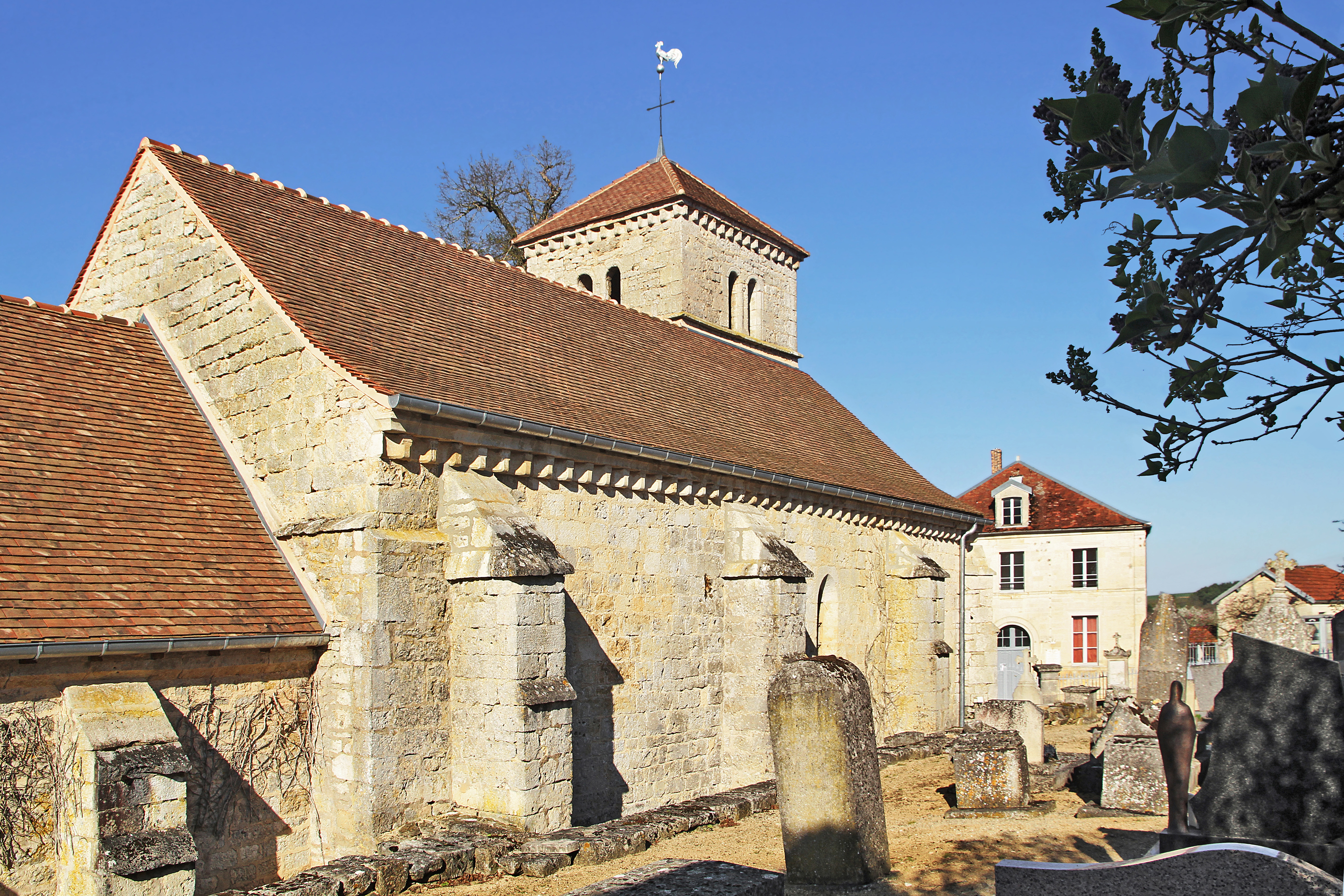
- The church in Menesble
- Location of Menesble
- Location within France Location within Bourgogne-Franche-Comté
- Coordinates: 47°46′27″N 4°53′51″E
- Country: France
- Region: Bourgogne-Franche-Comté
- Department: Côte-d'Or
- Arrondissement: Montbard
- Canton: Châtillon-sur-Seine
- Intercommunality: Pays Châtillonnais

Government
  - Mayor (2020–2026): Dominique Claudon
- Area^{1}: 5.51 km^{2} (2.13 sq mi)
- Elevation: 380 m (1,250 ft)
- Highest elevation: 446 m (1,463 ft)
- Lowest elevation: 298 m (978 ft)
- Population (2023): 17
  - Density: 3.1/km^{2} (8.0/sq mi)
- Time zone: UTC+01:00 (CET)
  - Summer (DST): UTC+02:00 (CEST)
- INSEE/Postal code: 21402 /21290
- ^{1} French Land Register data, which excludes lakes, ponds, glaciers > 1 km^{2} (0.386 sq mi or 247 acres) and river estuaries.

Menesble (French pronunciation: [mənɛbl]) is a commune in the Côte-d'Or department in eastern France.

== Population ==
Historical population
Year	Pop.	±% p.a.
1968	35	—
1975	25	−4.69%
1982	23	−1.18%
1990	13	−6.88%
1999	14	+0.83%
2007	10	−4.12%
2012	11	+1.92%
2017	10	−1.89%
2023	17	+9.25%
Source: INSEE

== See also ==
- Communes of the Côte-d'Or department
