= Saint-Broing-les-Moines =

- Commune
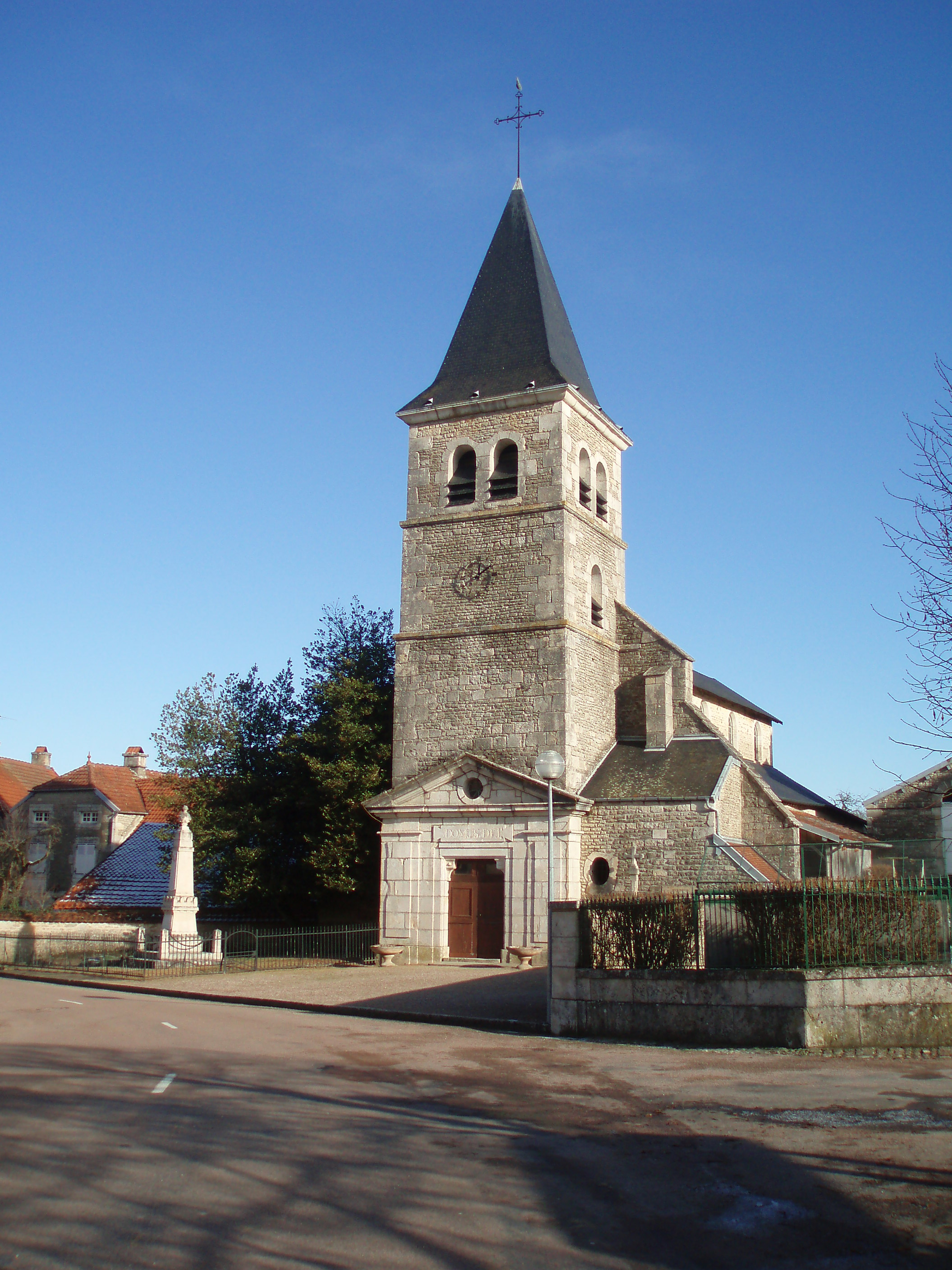
- The church in Saint-Broing-les-Moines

- Coat of arms
- Location of Saint-Broing-les-Moines
- Location within France Location within Bourgogne-Franche-Comté
- Coordinates: 47°41′53″N 4°50′33″E
- Country: France
- Region: Bourgogne-Franche-Comté
- Department: Côte-d'Or
- Arrondissement: Montbard
- Canton: Châtillon-sur-Seine
- Intercommunality: Pays Châtillonnais

Government
  - Mayor (2020–2026): Freddy Chevallier
- Area^{1}: 20.09 km^{2} (7.76 sq mi)
- Elevation: 390 m (1,280 ft)
- Highest elevation: 468 m (1,535 ft)
- Lowest elevation: 322 m (1,056 ft)
- Population (2023): 180
  - Density: 9.0/km^{2} (23/sq mi)
- Time zone: UTC+01:00 (CET)
  - Summer (DST): UTC+02:00 (CEST)
- INSEE/Postal code: 21543 /21290
- ^{1} French Land Register data, which excludes lakes, ponds, glaciers > 1 km^{2} (0.386 sq mi or 247 acres) and river estuaries.

Saint-Broing-les-Moines (French pronunciation: [sɛ̃ bʁwɛ̃ le mwan]) is a commune in the Côte-d'Or department in eastern France.

== Population ==
Historical population
Year	Pop.	±% p.a.
1968	267	—
1975	240	−1.51%
1982	260	+1.15%
1990	205	−2.93%
1999	181	−1.37%
2007	183	+0.14%
2012	190	+0.75%
2017	195	+0.52%
2023	180	−1.33%
Source: INSEE

== See also ==
- Communes of the Côte-d'Or department
