= Maisey-le-Duc =

- Commune
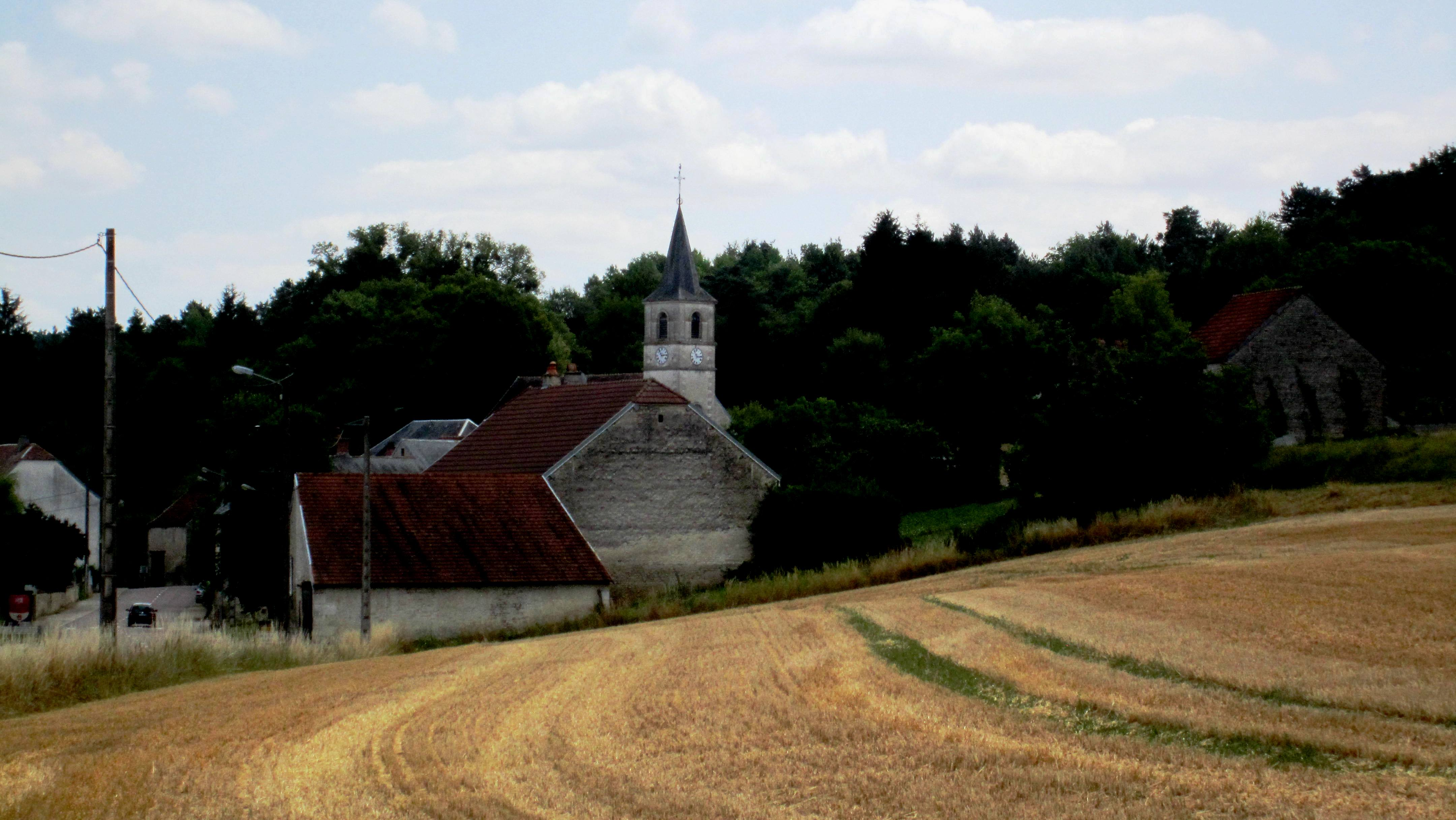
- A general view of Maisey-le-Duc

- Coat of arms
- Location of Maisey-le-Duc
- Location within France Location within Bourgogne-Franche-Comté
- Coordinates: 47°50′48″N 4°40′45″E
- Country: France
- Region: Bourgogne-Franche-Comté
- Department: Côte-d'Or
- Arrondissement: Montbard
- Canton: Châtillon-sur-Seine
- Intercommunality: Pays Châtillonnais

Government
  - Mayor (2020–2026): Éric Tilquin
- Area^{1}: 12.67 km^{2} (4.89 sq mi)
- Elevation: 247 m (810 ft)
- Highest elevation: 367 m (1,204 ft)
- Lowest elevation: 237 m (778 ft)
- Population (2023): 71
  - Density: 5.6/km^{2} (15/sq mi)
- Time zone: UTC+01:00 (CET)
  - Summer (DST): UTC+02:00 (CEST)
- INSEE/Postal code: 21372 /21400
- ^{1} French Land Register data, which excludes lakes, ponds, glaciers > 1 km^{2} (0.386 sq mi or 247 acres) and river estuaries.

Maisey-le-Duc (French pronunciation: [mɛzɛ lə dyk]) is a commune in the Côte-d'Or department in eastern France.

== Population ==
Historical population
Year	Pop.	±% p.a.
1968	137	—
1975	105	−3.73%
1982	91	−2.02%
1990	91	+0.00%
1999	91	+0.00%
2007	106	+1.93%
2012	91	−3.01%
2017	85	−1.35%
2023	71	−2.95%
Source: INSEE

== See also ==
- Communes of the Côte-d'Or department
