= Billy-lès-Chanceaux =

- Commune
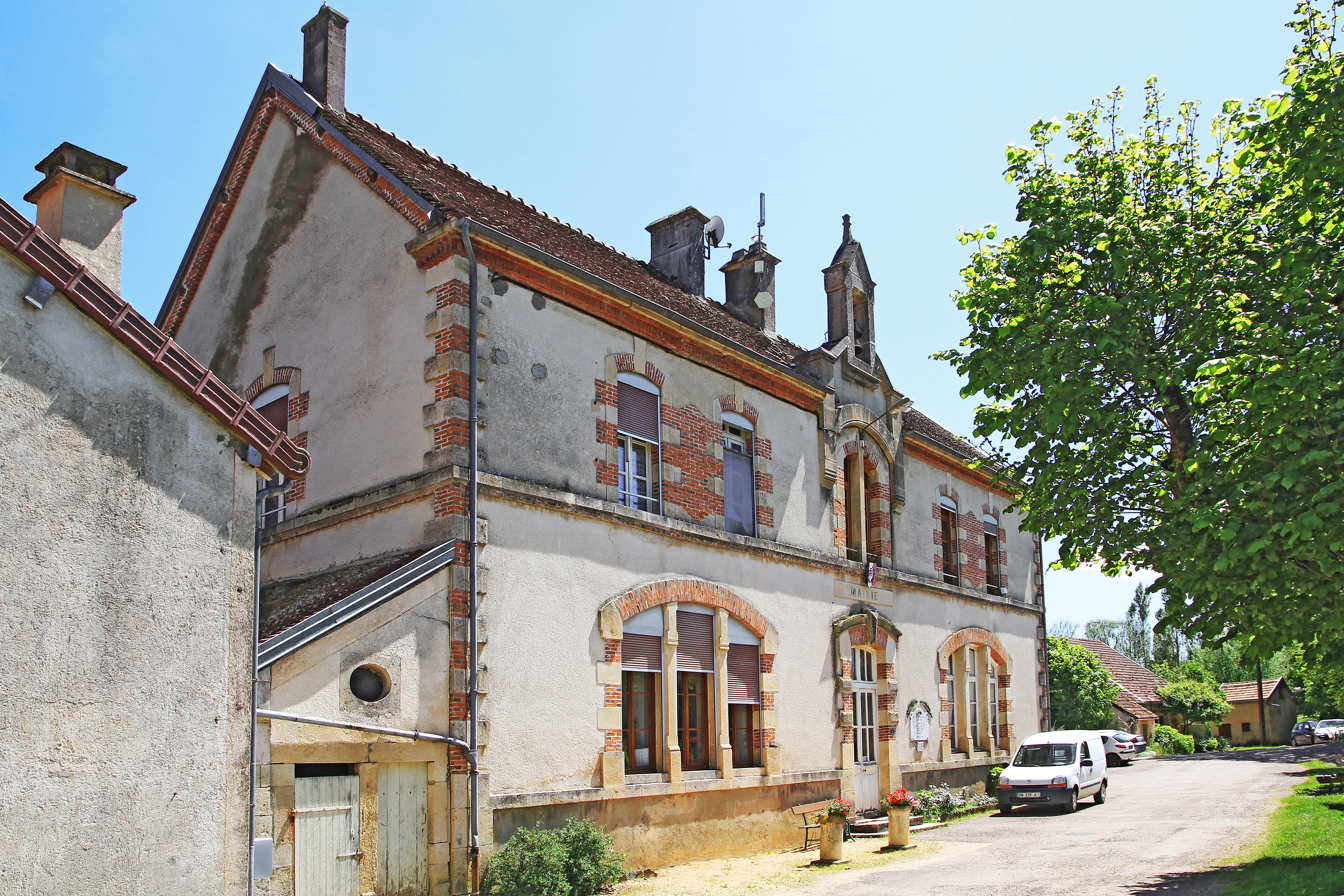
- Town hall
- Location of Billy-lès-Chanceaux
- Location within France Location within Bourgogne-Franche-Comté
- Coordinates: 47°32′54″N 4°42′33″E
- Country: France
- Region: Bourgogne-Franche-Comté
- Department: Côte-d'Or
- Arrondissement: Montbard
- Canton: Châtillon-sur-Seine
- Intercommunality: Pays Châtillonnais

Government
  - Mayor (2020–2026): Jean-Pierre Clerc
- Area^{1}: 22.29 km^{2} (8.61 sq mi)
- Elevation: 440 m (1,440 ft)
- Highest elevation: 499 m (1,637 ft)
- Lowest elevation: 358 m (1,175 ft)
- Population (2023): 72
  - Density: 3.2/km^{2} (8.4/sq mi)
- Time zone: UTC+01:00 (CET)
  - Summer (DST): UTC+02:00 (CEST)
- INSEE/Postal code: 21075 /21450
- ^{1} French Land Register data, which excludes lakes, ponds, glaciers > 1 km^{2} (0.386 sq mi or 247 acres) and river estuaries.

Billy-lès-Chanceaux is a commune in the Côte-d'Or department in eastern France.

== Population ==
Historical population
Year	Pop.	±% p.a.
1968	117	—
1975	76	−5.98%
1982	71	−0.97%
1990	76	+0.85%
1999	74	−0.30%
2007	81	+1.14%
2012	73	−2.06%
2017	61	−3.53%
2023	72	+2.80%
Source: INSEE

== See also ==
- Communes of the Côte-d'Or department
