= Nicey =

- Commune
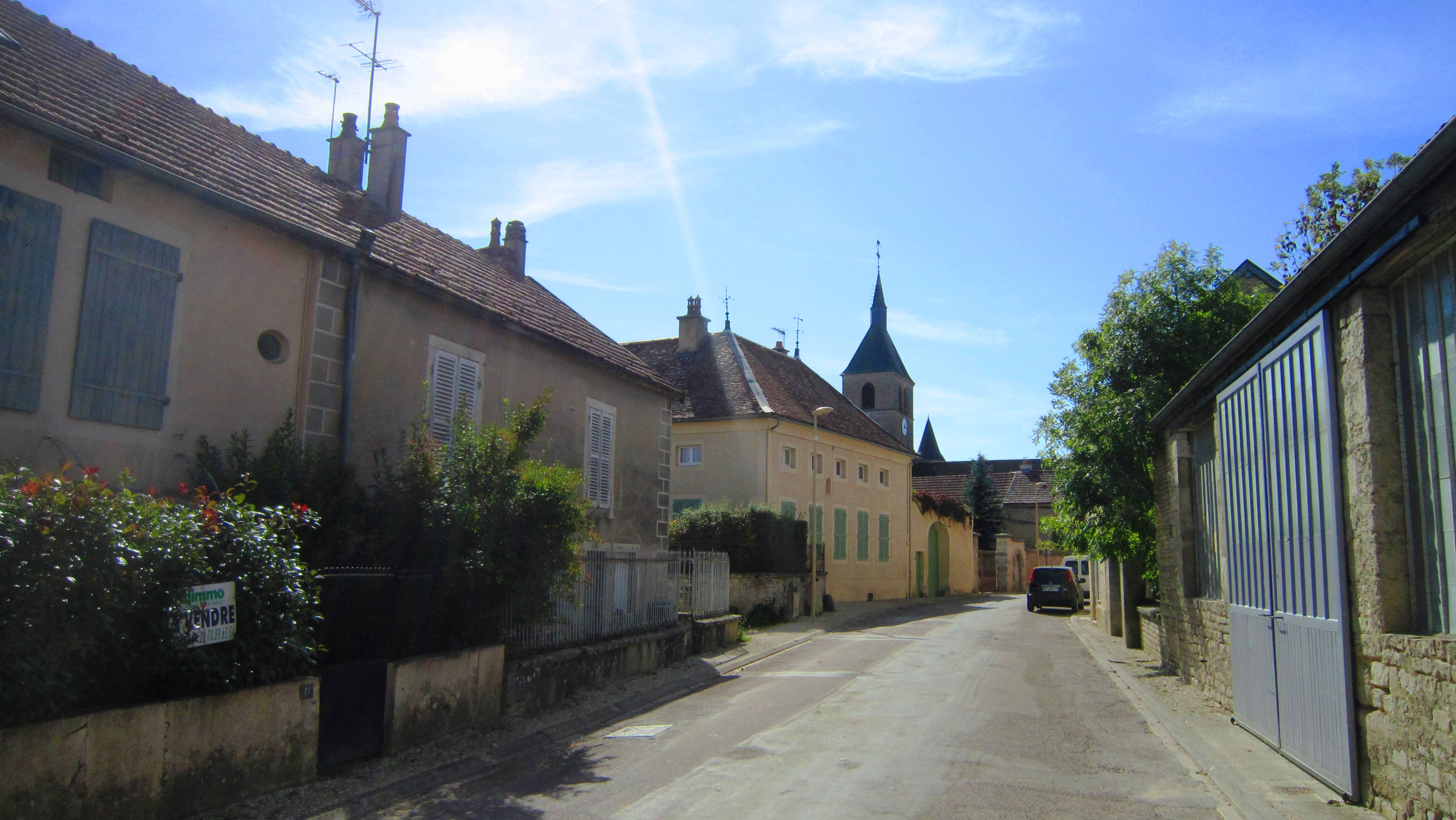
- A view within Nicey

- Coat of arms
- Location of Nicey
- Location within France Location within Bourgogne-Franche-Comté
- Coordinates: 47°51′46″N 4°18′57″E
- Country: France
- Region: Bourgogne-Franche-Comté
- Department: Côte-d'Or
- Arrondissement: Montbard
- Canton: Châtillon-sur-Seine
- Intercommunality: Pays Châtillonnais

Government
  - Mayor (2020–2026): Philippe Hugot
- Area^{1}: 23.86 km^{2} (9.21 sq mi)
- Highest elevation: 336 m (1,102 ft)
- Lowest elevation: 201 m (659 ft)
- Population (2023): 112
  - Density: 4.69/km^{2} (12.2/sq mi)
- Time zone: UTC+01:00 (CET)
  - Summer (DST): UTC+02:00 (CEST)
- INSEE/Postal code: 21454 /21330
- ^{1} French Land Register data, which excludes lakes, ponds, glaciers > 1 km^{2} (0.386 sq mi or 247 acres) and river estuaries.

Nicey (French pronunciation: [nisɛ]) is a commune in the Côte-d'Or department in eastern France.

== Population ==
Historical population
Year	Pop.	±% p.a.
1968	258	—
1975	230	−1.63%
1982	210	−1.29%
1990	171	−2.54%
1999	145	−1.82%
2007	136	−0.80%
2012	122	−2.15%
2017	110	−2.05%
2023	112	+0.30%
Source: INSEE

== See also ==
- Communes of the Côte-d'Or department
