= Villedieu, Côte-d'Or =

Villedieu
- Commune
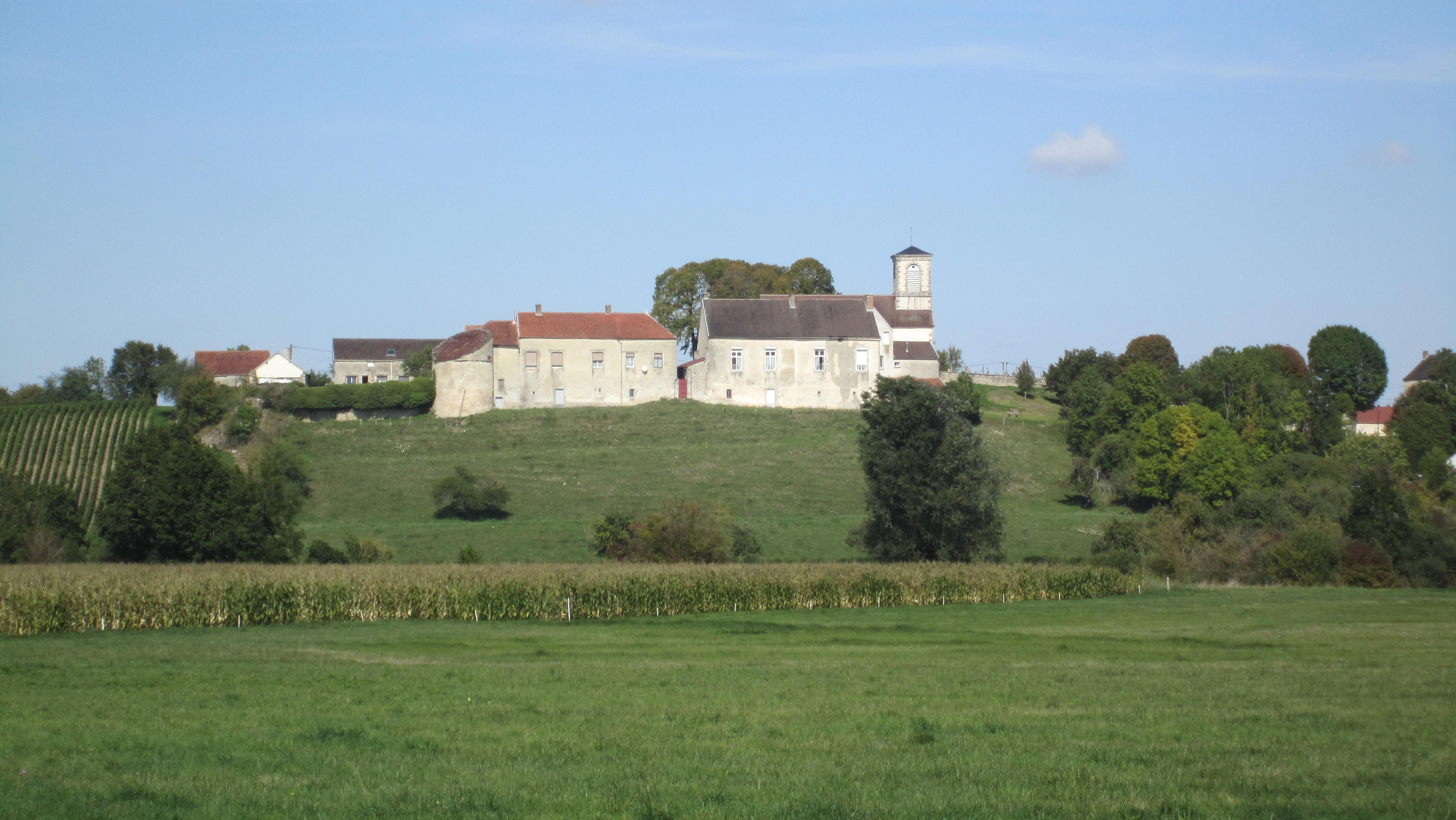
- A general view of Villedieu

- Coat of arms
- Location of Villedieu
- Location within France Location within Bourgogne-Franche-Comté
- Coordinates: 47°55′03″N 4°21′47″E
- Country: France
- Region: Bourgogne-Franche-Comté
- Department: Côte-d'Or
- Arrondissement: Montbard
- Canton: Châtillon-sur-Seine

Government
  - Mayor (2020–2026): Patrick Gouyette
- Area^{1}: 14.14 km^{2} (5.46 sq mi)
- Elevation: 225 m (738 ft)
- Highest elevation: 292 m (958 ft)
- Lowest elevation: 192 m (630 ft)
- Population (2023): 71
  - Density: 5.0/km^{2} (13/sq mi)
- Time zone: UTC+01:00 (CET)
  - Summer (DST): UTC+02:00 (CEST)
- INSEE/Postal code: 21693 /21330
- ^{1} French Land Register data, which excludes lakes, ponds, glaciers > 1 km^{2} (0.386 sq mi or 247 acres) and river estuaries.

Villedieu (French pronunciation: [vildjø]) is a commune in the Côte-d'Or department in eastern France.

== Population ==
Historical population
Year	Pop.	±% p.a.
1968	97	—
1975	93	−0.60%
1982	84	−1.44%
1990	77	−1.08%
1999	98	+2.72%
2007	87	−1.48%
2012	69	−4.53%
2017	69	+0.00%
2023	71	+0.48%
Source: INSEE

== See also ==
- Communes of the Côte-d'Or department
