= Vesvres =

- Commune
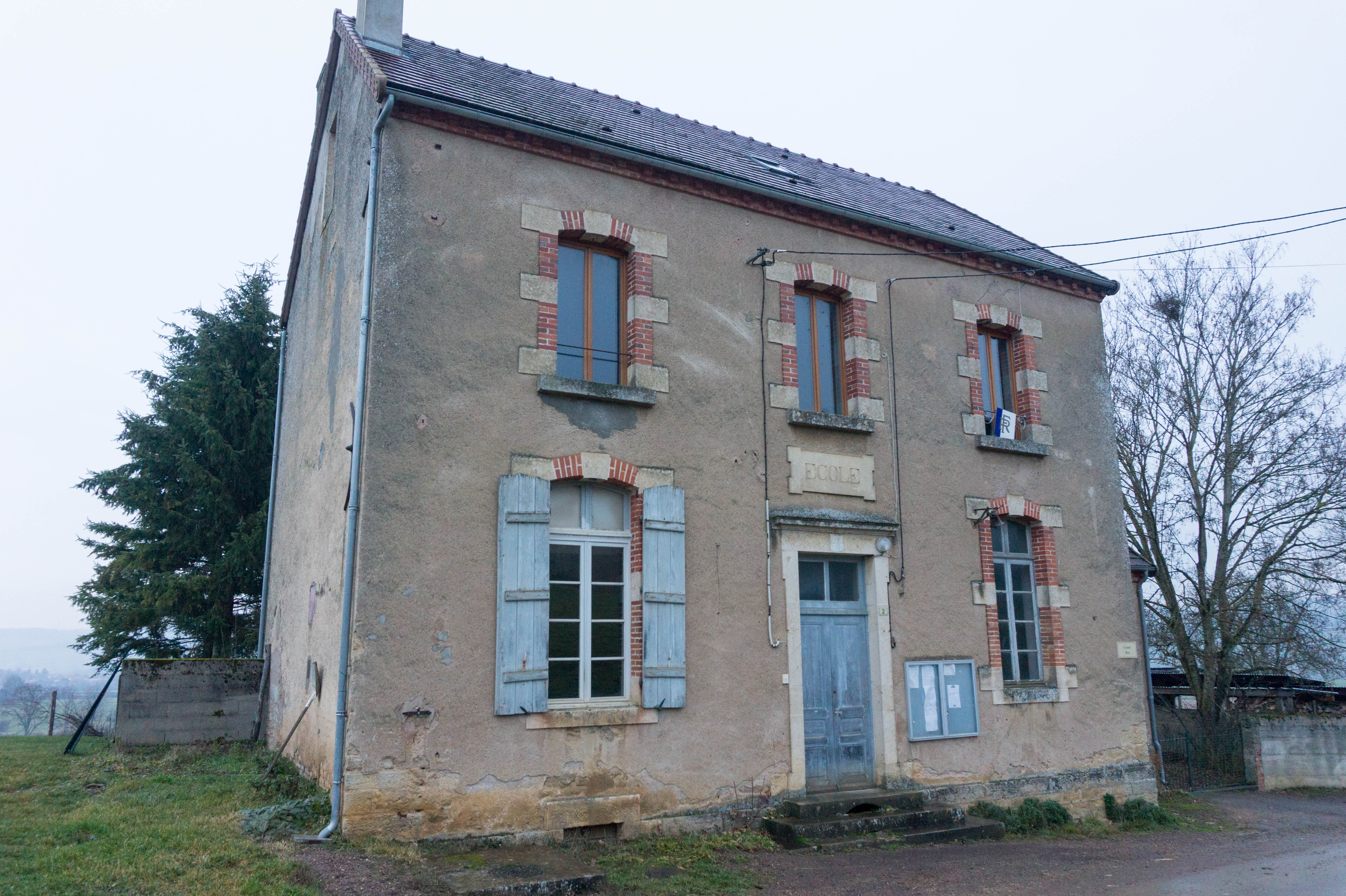
- The town hall in Vesvres
- Location of Vesvres
- Location within France Location within Bourgogne-Franche-Comté
- Coordinates: 47°23′01″N 4°31′58″E
- Country: France
- Region: Bourgogne-Franche-Comté
- Department: Côte-d'Or
- Arrondissement: Montbard
- Canton: Semur-en-Auxois

Government
  - Mayor (2020–2026): Jean-Marc Sarrazin
- Area^{1}: 4.15 km^{2} (1.60 sq mi)
- Elevation: 350 m (1,150 ft)
- Highest elevation: 511 m (1,677 ft)
- Lowest elevation: 329 m (1,079 ft)
- Population (2023): 29
  - Density: 7.0/km^{2} (18/sq mi)
- Time zone: UTC+01:00 (CET)
  - Summer (DST): UTC+02:00 (CEST)
- INSEE/Postal code: 21672 /21350
- ^{1} French Land Register data, which excludes lakes, ponds, glaciers > 1 km^{2} (0.386 sq mi or 247 acres) and river estuaries.

Vesvres (French pronunciation: [vɛvʁ]) is a commune in the Côte-d'Or department in eastern France.

== Population ==
Historical population
Year	Pop.	±% p.a.
1968	38	—
1975	40	+0.74%
1982	33	−2.71%
1990	32	−0.38%
1999	25	−2.71%
2007	26	+0.49%
2012	21	−4.18%
2017	27	+5.15%
2023	29	+1.20%
Source: INSEE

== See also ==
- Communes of the Côte-d'Or department
