= Orret =

- Commune
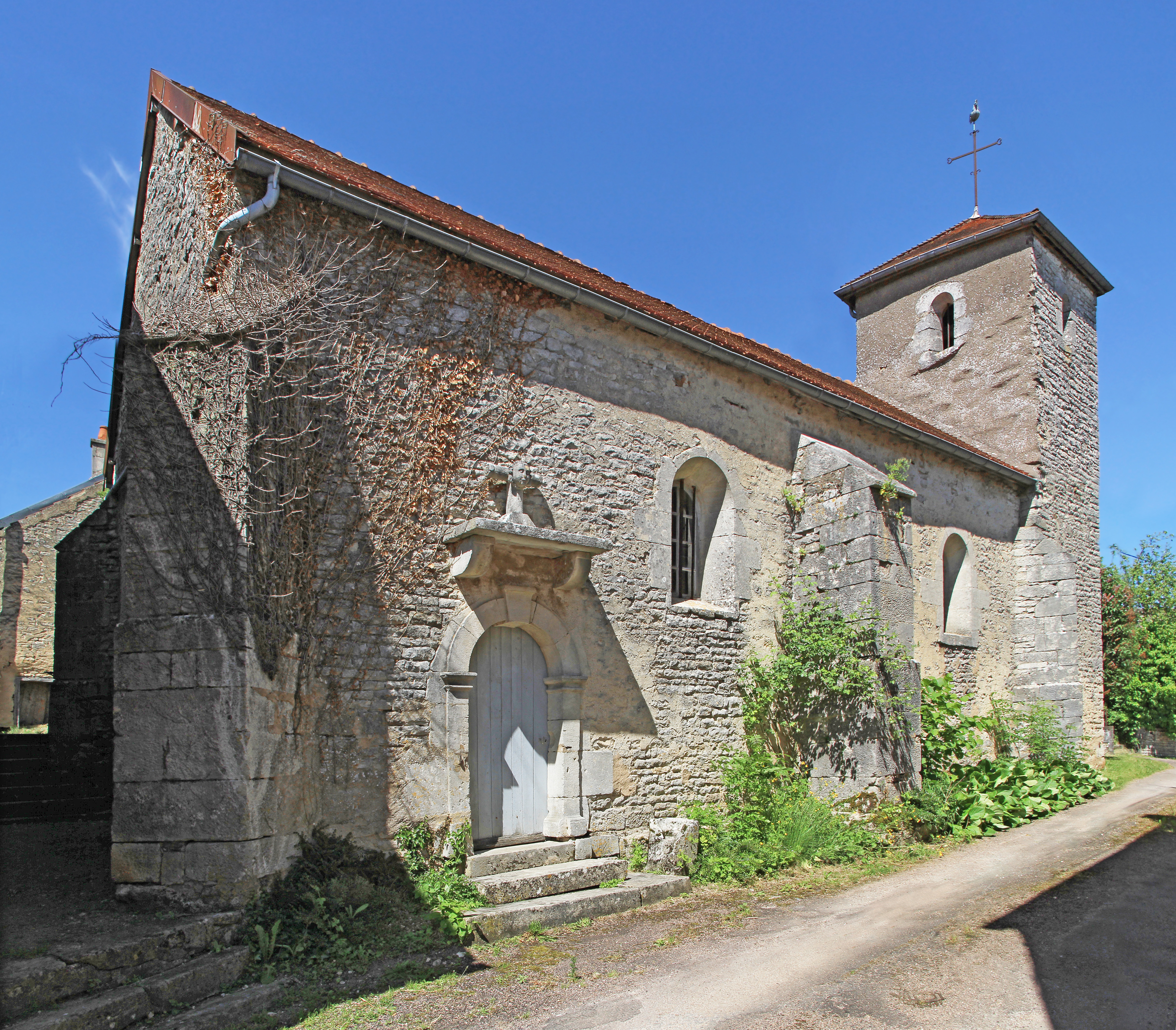
- The church in Orret
- Location of Orret
- Location within France Location within Bourgogne-Franche-Comté
- Coordinates: 47°35′56″N 4°41′42″E
- Country: France
- Region: Bourgogne-Franche-Comté
- Department: Côte-d'Or
- Arrondissement: Montbard
- Canton: Châtillon-sur-Seine
- Intercommunality: Pays Châtillonnais

Government
  - Mayor (2020–2026): Guillaume Beugnot
- Area^{1}: 11.37 km^{2} (4.39 sq mi)
- Elevation: 436 m (1,430 ft)
- Highest elevation: 446 m (1,463 ft)
- Lowest elevation: 319 m (1,047 ft)
- Population (2023): 12
  - Density: 1.1/km^{2} (2.7/sq mi)
- Time zone: UTC+01:00 (CET)
  - Summer (DST): UTC+02:00 (CEST)
- INSEE/Postal code: 21471 /21450
- ^{1} French Land Register data, which excludes lakes, ponds, glaciers > 1 km^{2} (0.386 sq mi or 247 acres) and river estuaries.

Orret (French pronunciation: [ɔʁɛ]) is a commune in the Côte-d'Or department in eastern France.

== Population ==
Historical population
Year	Pop.	±% p.a.
1968	51	—
1975	45	−1.77%
1982	52	+2.09%
1990	32	−5.89%
1999	26	−2.28%
2007	24	−1.00%
2012	19	−4.56%
2017	16	−3.38%
2023	12	−4.68%
Source: INSEE

== See also ==
- Communes of the Côte-d'Or department
