= Échalot =

- Commune
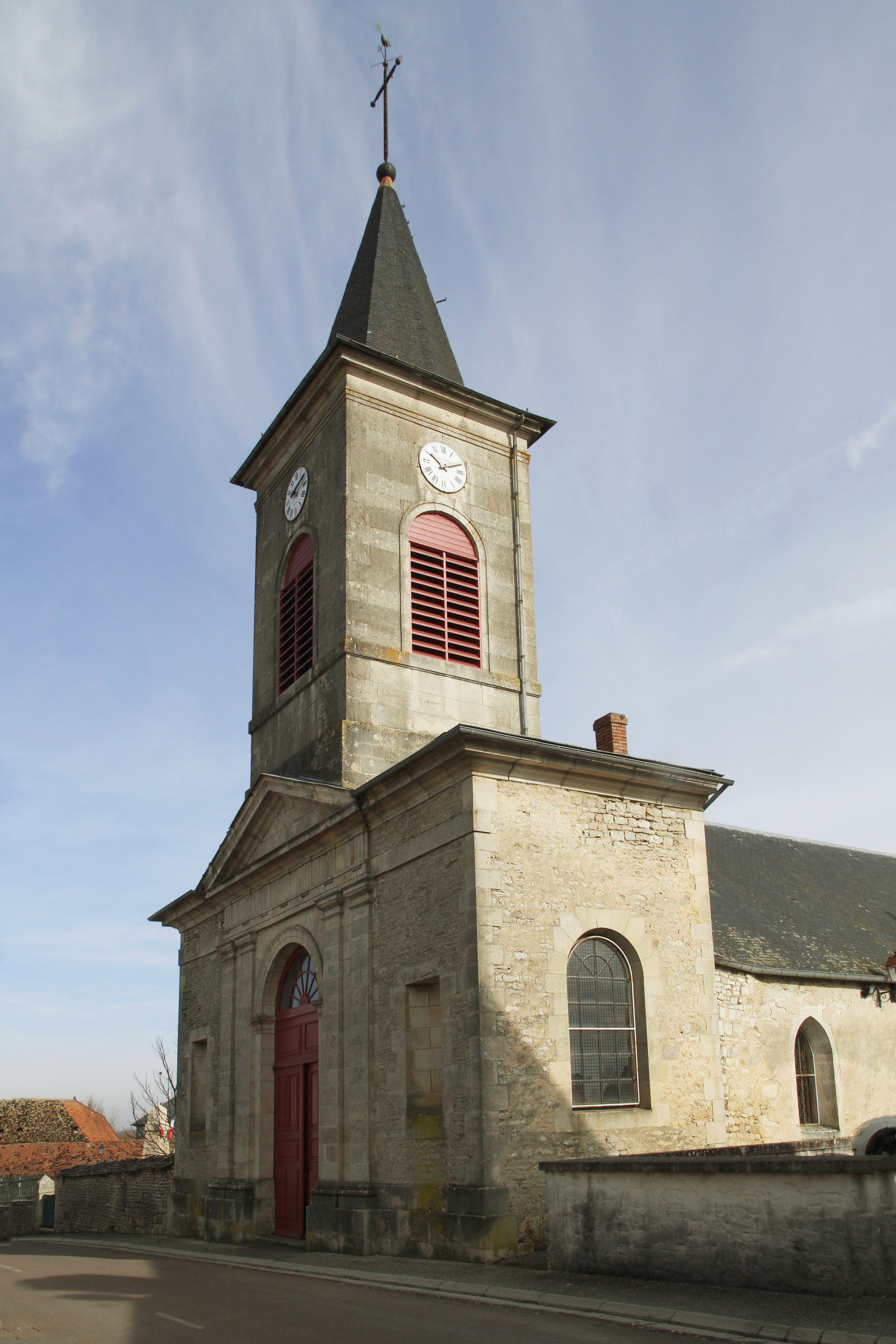
- Église de l'Assomption d'Échalot is the local church

- Coat of arms
- Location of Échalot
- Location within France Location within Bourgogne-Franche-Comté
- Coordinates: 47°36′46″N 4°50′19″E
- Country: France
- Region: Bourgogne-Franche-Comté
- Department: Côte-d'Or
- Arrondissement: Montbard
- Canton: Châtillon-sur-Seine
- Intercommunality: Pays Châtillonnais

Government
  - Mayor (2020–2026): Nicolas Hoffmann
- Area^{1}: 27.65 km^{2} (10.68 sq mi)
- Elevation: 450 m (1,480 ft)
- Highest elevation: 527 m (1,729 ft)
- Lowest elevation: 368 m (1,207 ft)
- Population (2023): 93
  - Density: 3.4/km^{2} (8.7/sq mi)
- Time zone: UTC+01:00 (CET)
  - Summer (DST): UTC+02:00 (CEST)
- INSEE/Postal code: 21237 /21510
- ^{1} French Land Register data, which excludes lakes, ponds, glaciers > 1 km^{2} (0.386 sq mi or 247 acres) and river estuaries.

Échalot (French pronunciation: [eʃalo]) is a commune in the Côte-d'Or department in eastern France.

== Population ==
Historical population
Year	Pop.	±% p.a.
1968	172	—
1975	144	−2.51%
1982	133	−1.13%
1990	118	−1.48%
1999	95	−2.38%
2007	104	+1.14%
2012	106	+0.38%
2017	95	−2.17%
2023	93	−0.35%
Source: INSEE

== See also ==
- Communes of the Côte-d'Or department
