= Prusly-sur-Ource =

- Commune
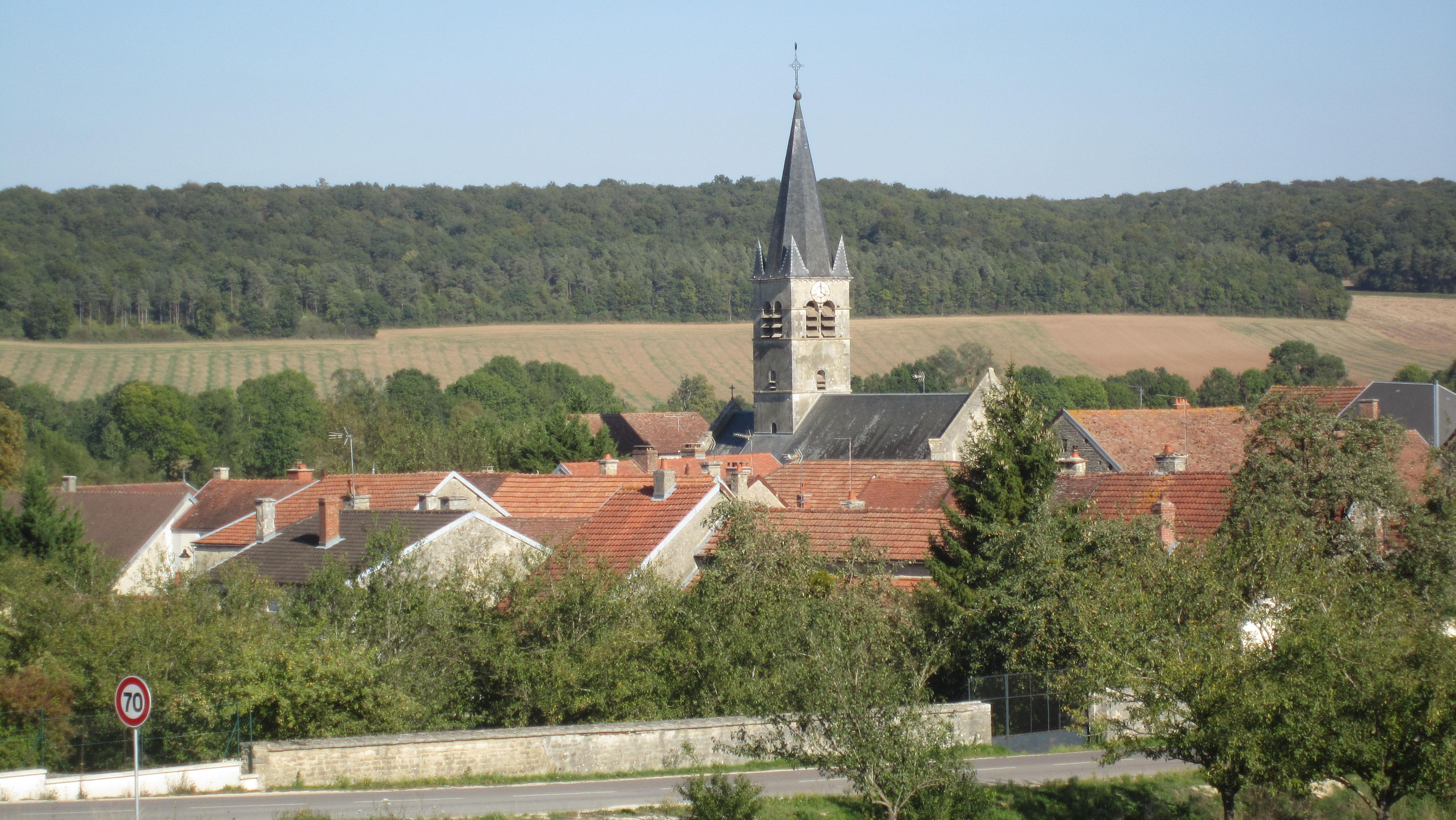
- A general view of Prusly-sur-Ource

- Coat of arms
- Location of Prusly-sur-Ource
- Location within France Location within Bourgogne-Franche-Comté
- Coordinates: 47°52′19″N 4°39′44″E
- Country: France
- Region: Bourgogne-Franche-Comté
- Department: Côte-d'Or
- Arrondissement: Montbard
- Canton: Châtillon-sur-Seine
- Intercommunality: Pays Châtillonnais

Government
  - Mayor (2020–2026): Alain Verpy
- Area^{1}: 15.74 km^{2} (6.08 sq mi)
- Elevation: 240 m (790 ft)
- Highest elevation: 320 m (1,050 ft)
- Lowest elevation: 225 m (738 ft)
- Population (2023): 164
  - Density: 10.4/km^{2} (27.0/sq mi)
- Time zone: UTC+01:00 (CET)
  - Summer (DST): UTC+02:00 (CEST)
- INSEE/Postal code: 21510 /21400
- ^{1} French Land Register data, which excludes lakes, ponds, glaciers > 1 km^{2} (0.386 sq mi or 247 acres) and river estuaries.

Prusly-sur-Ource (French pronunciation: [pʁyli syʁ uʁs], literally Prusly on Ource) is a commune in the Côte-d'Or department in eastern France.

== Population ==
Historical population
Year	Pop.	±% p.a.
1968	148	—
1975	135	−1.30%
1982	198	+5.62%
1990	203	+0.31%
1999	193	−0.56%
2007	176	−1.15%
2012	178	+0.23%
2017	159	−2.23%
2023	164	+0.52%
Source: INSEE

== See also ==
- Communes of the Côte-d'Or department
