= Fontaines-en-Duesmois =

- Commune
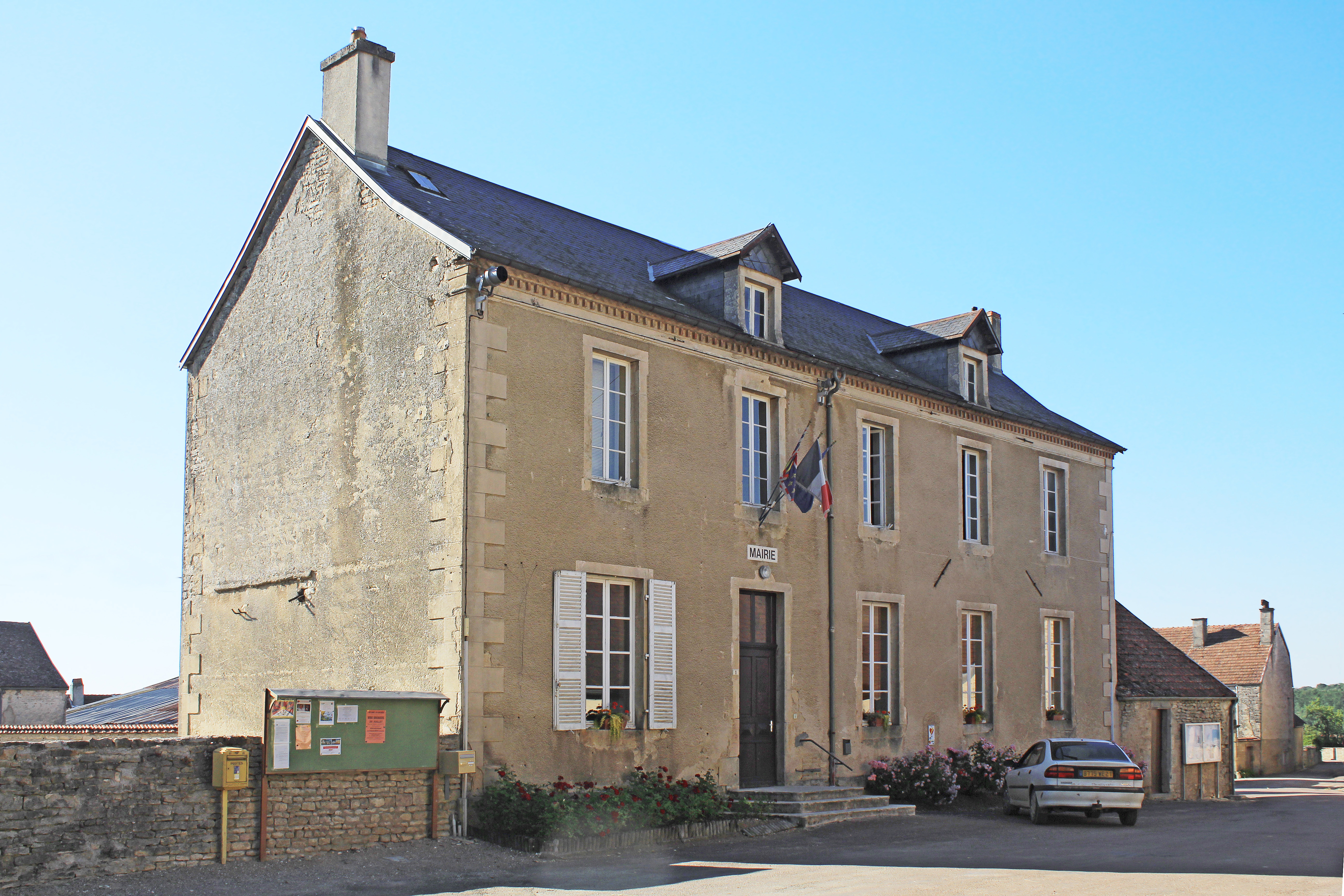
- The town hall in Fontaines-en-Duesmois

- Coat of arms
- Location of Fontaines-en-Duesmois
- Location within France Location within Bourgogne-Franche-Comté
- Coordinates: 47°39′00″N 4°32′40″E
- Country: France
- Region: Bourgogne-Franche-Comté
- Department: Côte-d'Or
- Arrondissement: Montbard
- Canton: Châtillon-sur-Seine
- Intercommunality: Pays Châtillonnais

Government
  - Mayor (2020–2026): Christian Demoingeot
- Area^{1}: 17.9 km^{2} (6.9 sq mi)
- Highest elevation: 419 m (1,375 ft)
- Lowest elevation: 334 m (1,096 ft)
- Population (2023): 116
  - Density: 6.48/km^{2} (16.8/sq mi)
- Time zone: UTC+01:00 (CET)
  - Summer (DST): UTC+02:00 (CEST)
- INSEE/Postal code: 21276 /21450
- ^{1} French Land Register data, which excludes lakes, ponds, glaciers > 1 km^{2} (0.386 sq mi or 247 acres) and river estuaries.

Fontaines-en-Duesmois is a commune in the Côte-d'Or department in eastern France.

== Population ==
Historical population
Year	Pop.	±% p.a.
1968	175	—
1975	171	−0.33%
1982	134	−3.42%
1990	124	−0.96%
1999	126	+0.18%
2007	143	+1.59%
2012	126	−2.50%
2017	120	−0.97%
2023	116	−0.56%
Source: INSEE

== See also ==
- Communes of the Côte-d'Or department
