= Moitron =

- Commune
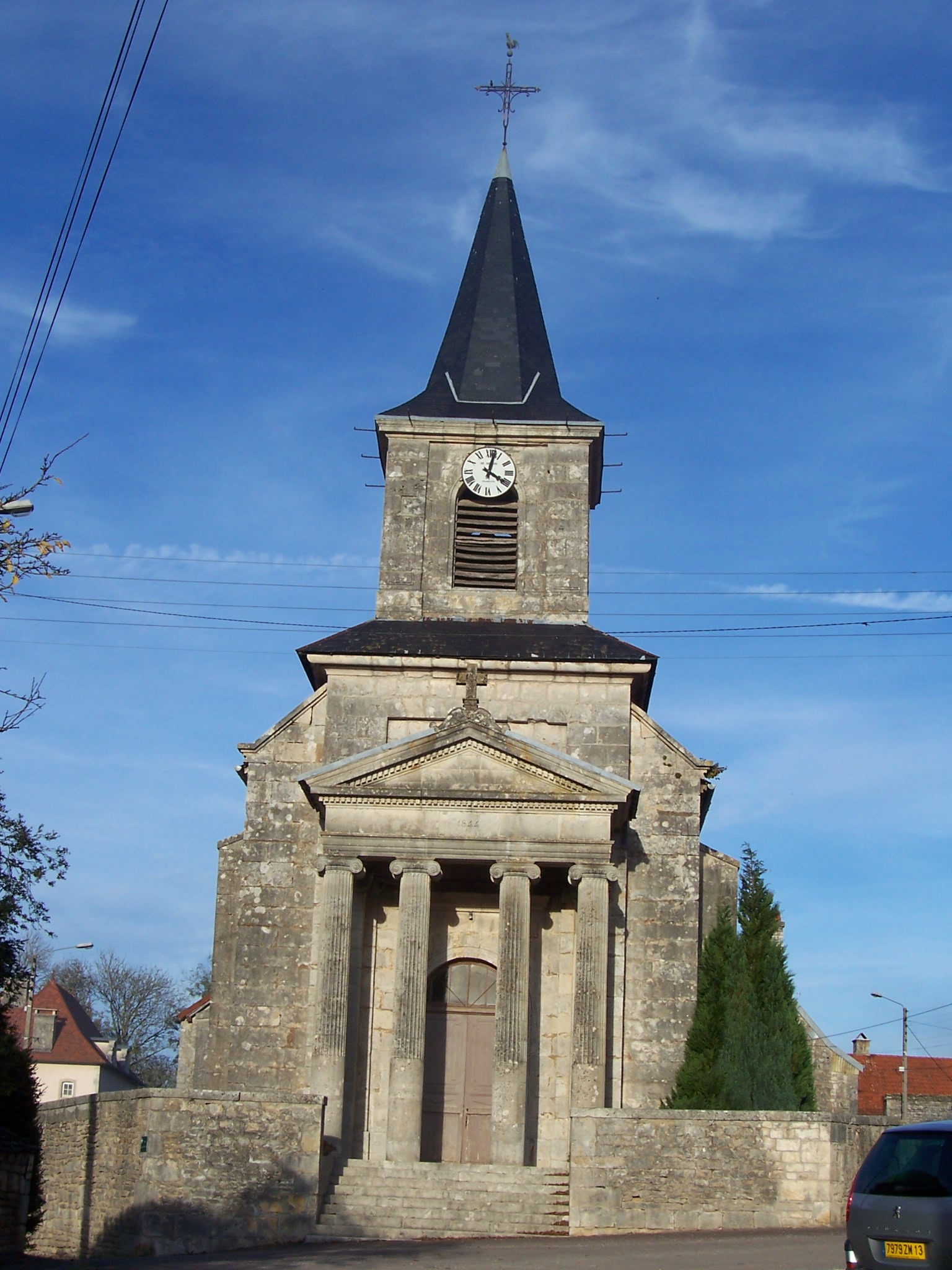
- The church in Moitron

- Coat of arms
- Location of Moitron
- Location within France Location within Bourgogne-Franche-Comté
- Coordinates: 47°40′39″N 4°49′19″E
- Country: France
- Region: Bourgogne-Franche-Comté
- Department: Côte-d'Or
- Arrondissement: Montbard
- Canton: Châtillon-sur-Seine
- Intercommunality: Pays Châtillonnais

Government
  - Mayor (2020–2026): Maud Lachouette
- Area^{1}: 15.38 km^{2} (5.94 sq mi)
- Elevation: 452 m (1,483 ft)
- Highest elevation: 469 m (1,539 ft)
- Lowest elevation: 335 m (1,099 ft)
- Population (2023): 57
  - Density: 3.7/km^{2} (9.6/sq mi)
- Time zone: UTC+01:00 (CET)
  - Summer (DST): UTC+02:00 (CEST)
- INSEE/Postal code: 21418 /21510
- ^{1} French Land Register data, which excludes lakes, ponds, glaciers > 1 km^{2} (0.386 sq mi or 247 acres) and river estuaries.

Moitron (French pronunciation: [mwatʁɔ̃]) is a commune in the Côte-d'Or department in eastern France.

== Population ==
Historical population
Year	Pop.	±% p.a.
1968	89	—
1975	85	−0.65%
1982	74	−1.96%
1990	58	−3.00%
1999	47	−2.31%
2007	55	+1.98%
2012	61	+2.09%
2017	62	+0.33%
2023	57	−1.39%
Source: INSEE

== See also ==
- Communes of the Côte-d'Or department
