= Buxerolles, Côte-d'Or =

Buxerolles
- Commune
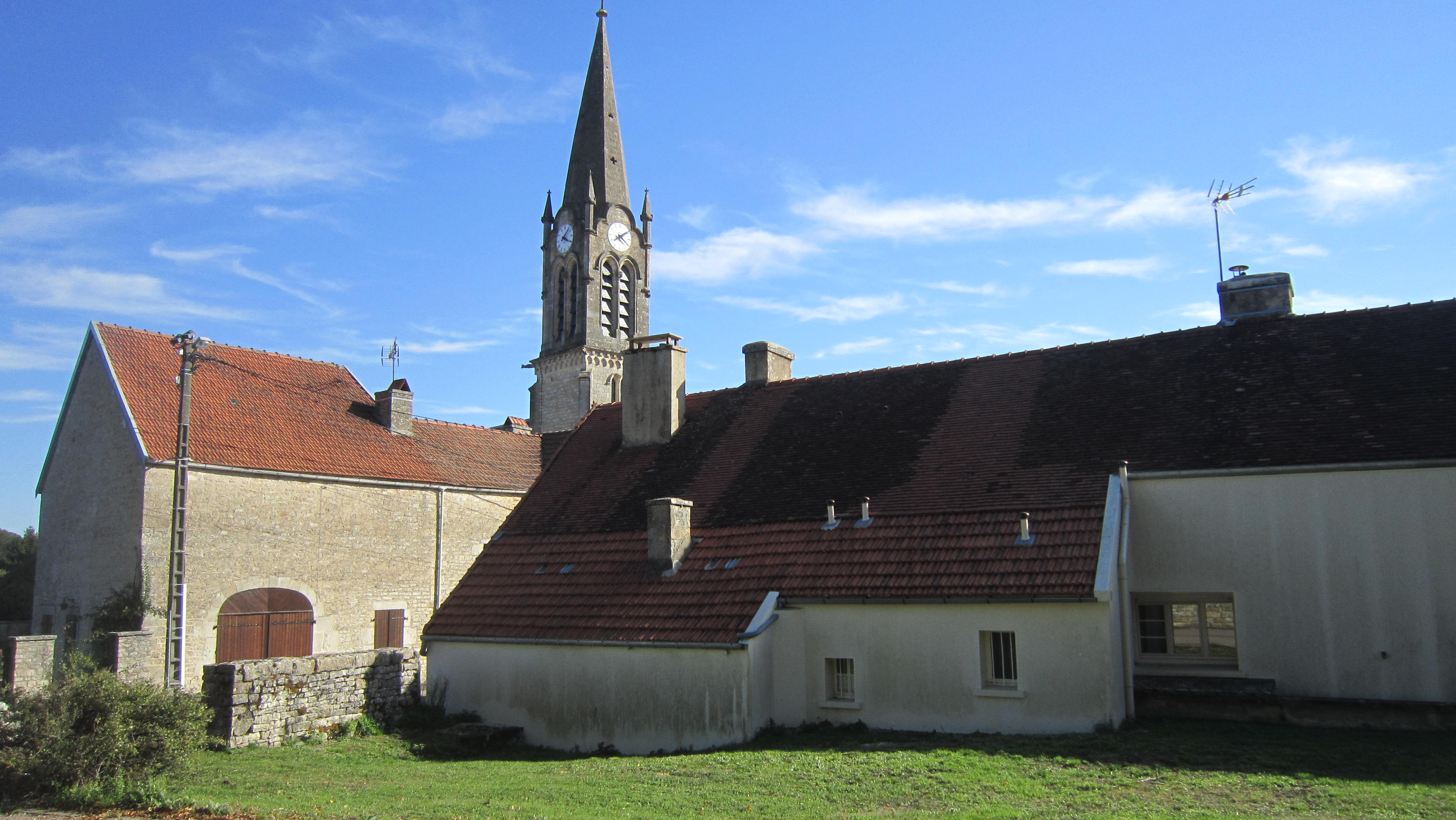
- A view within Buxerolles
- Location of Buxerolles
- Location within France Location within Bourgogne-Franche-Comté
- Coordinates: 47°48′28″N 4°55′59″E
- Country: France
- Region: Bourgogne-Franche-Comté
- Department: Côte-d'Or
- Arrondissement: Montbard
- Canton: Châtillon-sur-Seine
- Intercommunality: Pays Châtillonnais

Government
  - Mayor (2020–2026): Jeanne Colombet
- Area^{1}: 11.97 km^{2} (4.62 sq mi)
- Elevation: 374 m (1,227 ft)
- Highest elevation: 444 m (1,457 ft)
- Lowest elevation: 324 m (1,063 ft)
- Population (2023): 34
  - Density: 2.8/km^{2} (7.4/sq mi)
- Time zone: UTC+01:00 (CET)
  - Summer (DST): UTC+02:00 (CEST)
- INSEE/Postal code: 21123 /21290
- ^{1} French Land Register data, which excludes lakes, ponds, glaciers > 1 km^{2} (0.386 sq mi or 247 acres) and river estuaries.

Buxerolles (French pronunciation: [byksəʁɔl]) is a commune in the Côte-d'Or department in eastern France.

== Population ==
Historical population
Year	Pop.	±% p.a.
1968	57	—
1975	32	−7.92%
1982	34	+0.87%
1990	39	+1.73%
1999	37	−0.58%
2007	25	−4.78%
2012	24	−0.81%
2017	31	+5.25%
2023	34	+1.55%
Source: INSEE

== See also ==
- Communes of the Côte-d'Or department
