= Genay, Côte-d'Or =

Genay
- Commune
- Location of Genay
- Location within France Location within Bourgogne-Franche-Comté
- Coordinates: 47°31′36″N 4°17′57″E
- Country: France
- Region: Bourgogne-Franche-Comté
- Department: Côte-d'Or
- Arrondissement: Montbard
- Canton: Semur-en-Auxois
- Intercommunality: Terres d'Auxois

Government
  - Mayor (2020–2026): Jean-Michel Garraut
- Area^{1}: 13.82 km^{2} (5.34 sq mi)
- Elevation: 240 m (790 ft)
- Highest elevation: 405 m (1,329 ft)
- Lowest elevation: 218 m (715 ft)
- Population (2023): 370
  - Density: 27/km^{2} (69/sq mi)
- Time zone: UTC+01:00 (CET)
  - Summer (DST): UTC+02:00 (CEST)
- INSEE/Postal code: 21291 /21140
- ^{1} French Land Register data, which excludes lakes, ponds, glaciers > 1 km^{2} (0.386 sq mi or 247 acres) and river estuaries.

Genay (French pronunciation: [ʒənɛ]) is a commune in the Côte-d'Or department in eastern France.

== Population ==
Historical population
Year	Pop.	±% p.a.
1968	294	—
1975	279	−0.75%
1982	294	+0.75%
1990	308	+0.58%
1999	339	+1.07%
2007	338	−0.04%
2012	348	+0.58%
2017	374	+1.45%
2023	370	−0.18%
Source: INSEE

== See also ==
- Communes of the Côte-d'Or department
