= Juilly =

Juilly is the name of two communes in France:

- Juilly, in the Côte-d'Or département
- Juilly, in the Seine-et-Marne département
