= Sainte-Colombe-en-Auxois =

- Commune
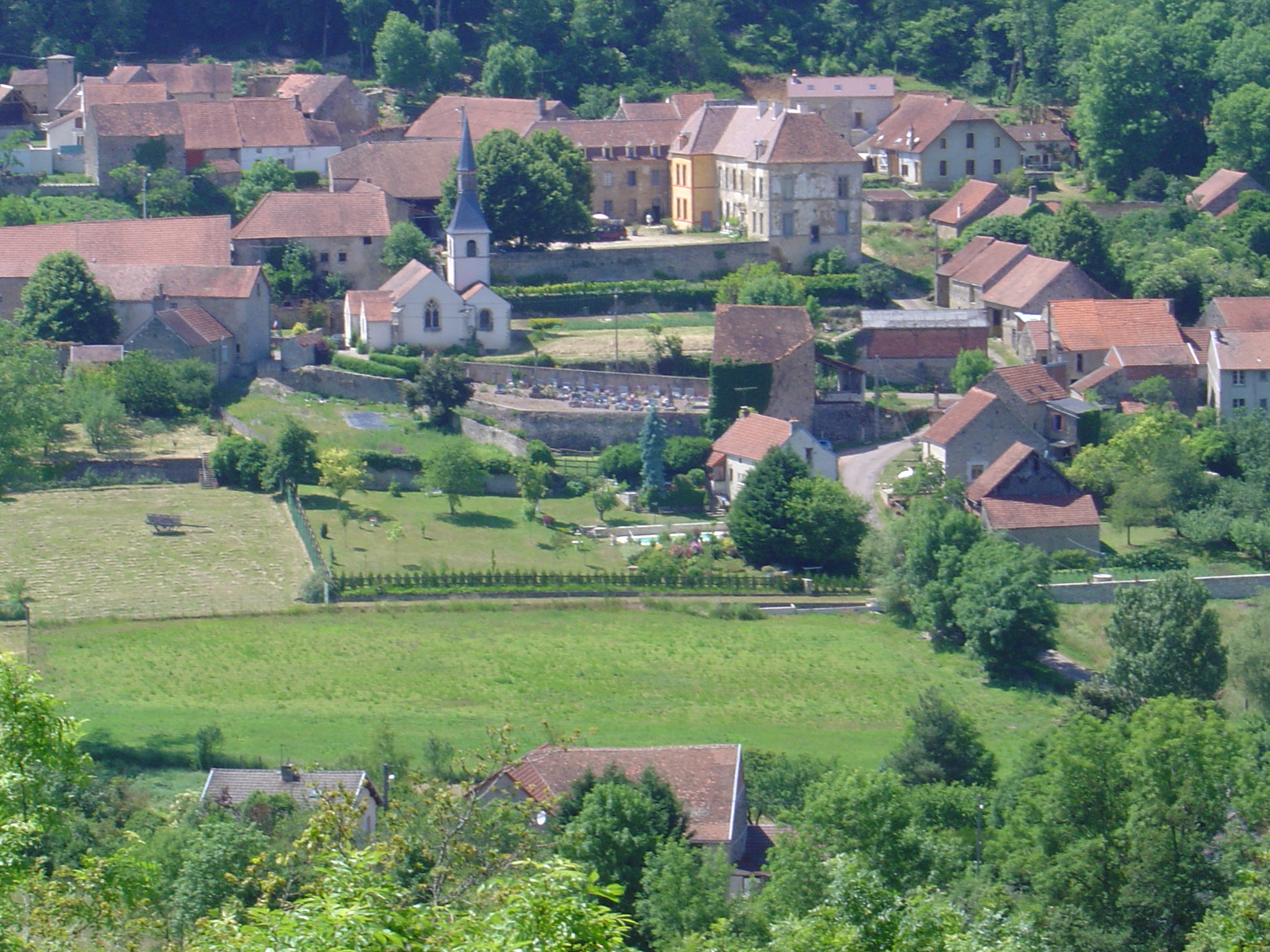
- A general view of Sainte-Colombe-en-Auxois
- Location of Sainte-Colombe-en-Auxois
- Location within France Location within Bourgogne-Franche-Comté
- Coordinates: 47°25′40″N 4°27′31″E
- Country: France
- Region: Bourgogne-Franche-Comté
- Department: Côte-d'Or
- Arrondissement: Montbard
- Canton: Semur-en-Auxois

Government
  - Mayor (2020–2026): Pierre Faure-Sternad
- Area^{1}: 6.29 km^{2} (2.43 sq mi)
- Elevation: 405 m (1,329 ft)
- Highest elevation: 498 m (1,634 ft)
- Lowest elevation: 333 m (1,093 ft)
- Population (2023): 53
  - Density: 8.4/km^{2} (22/sq mi)
- Time zone: UTC+01:00 (CET)
  - Summer (DST): UTC+02:00 (CEST)
- INSEE/Postal code: 21544 /21350
- ^{1} French Land Register data, which excludes lakes, ponds, glaciers > 1 km^{2} (0.386 sq mi or 247 acres) and river estuaries.

Sainte-Colombe-en-Auxois (French pronunciation: [sɛ̃t kɔlɔ̃b ɑ̃.n‿o(k)swa], lit. 'Sainte Colombe in Auxois'; before 2014: Sainte-Colombe) is a commune in the Côte-d'Or department in eastern France.

== Population ==
Historical population
Year	Pop.	±% p.a.
1968	56	—
1975	44	−3.39%
1982	45	+0.32%
1990	53	+2.07%
1999	59	+1.20%
2007	70	+2.16%
2012	57	−4.03%
2017	57	+0.00%
2023	53	−1.21%
Source: INSEE

== See also ==
- Communes of the Côte-d'Or department
