= Saint-Hélier, Côte-d'Or =

Saint-Hélier
- Commune
- Coat of arms
- Location of Saint-Hélier
- Location within France Location within Bourgogne-Franche-Comté
- Coordinates: 47°23′09″N 4°41′00″E
- Country: France
- Region: Bourgogne-Franche-Comté
- Department: Côte-d'Or
- Arrondissement: Montbard
- Canton: Semur-en-Auxois

Government
  - Mayor (2021–2026): Geneviève Brechat
- Area^{1}: 3.93 km^{2} (1.52 sq mi)
- Elevation: 410 m (1,350 ft)
- Highest elevation: 549 m (1,801 ft)
- Lowest elevation: 380 m (1,250 ft)
- Population (2023): 36
  - Density: 9.2/km^{2} (24/sq mi)
- Time zone: UTC+01:00 (CET)
  - Summer (DST): UTC+02:00 (CEST)
- INSEE/Postal code: 21552 /21690
- ^{1} French Land Register data, which excludes lakes, ponds, glaciers > 1 km^{2} (0.386 sq mi or 247 acres) and river estuaries.

Saint-Hélier (French pronunciation: [sɛ̃.t‿elje]) is a commune in the Côte-d'Or department in eastern France.

== Population ==
Historical population
Year	Pop.	±% p.a.
1968	33	—
1975	29	−1.83%
1982	26	−1.55%
1990	27	+0.47%
1999	25	−0.85%
2007	39	+5.72%
2012	43	+1.97%
2017	35	−4.03%
2023	36	+0.47%
Source: INSEE

== See also ==
- Communes of the Côte-d'Or department
