= Chevannay =

- Commune
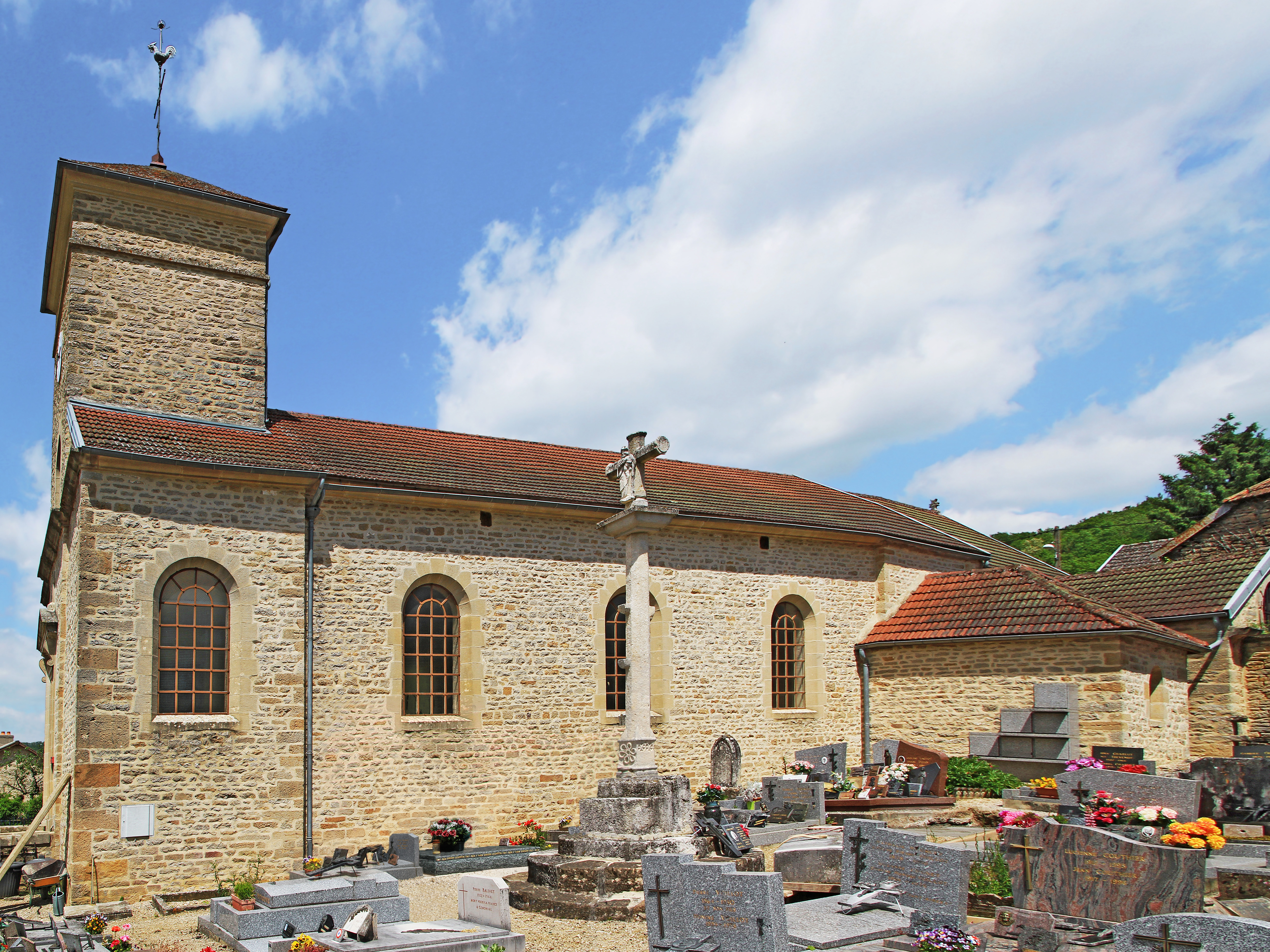
- The church in Chevannay
- Location of Chevannay
- Location within France Location within Bourgogne-Franche-Comté
- Coordinates: 47°23′50″N 4°39′18″E
- Country: France
- Region: Bourgogne-Franche-Comté
- Department: Côte-d'Or
- Arrondissement: Montbard
- Canton: Semur-en-Auxois

Government
  - Mayor (2020–2026): Paul Lachot
- Area^{1}: 7.16 km^{2} (2.76 sq mi)
- Elevation: 492 m (1,614 ft)
- Highest elevation: 533 m (1,749 ft)
- Lowest elevation: 345 m (1,132 ft)
- Population (2023): 34
  - Density: 4.7/km^{2} (12/sq mi)
- Time zone: UTC+01:00 (CET)
  - Summer (DST): UTC+02:00 (CEST)
- INSEE/Postal code: 21168 /21540
- ^{1} French Land Register data, which excludes lakes, ponds, glaciers > 1 km^{2} (0.386 sq mi or 247 acres) and river estuaries.

Chevannay (French pronunciation: [ʃəvanɛ]) is a commune in the Côte-d'Or department in eastern France.

== Population ==
Historical population
Year	Pop.	±% p.a.
1968	52	—
1975	39	−4.03%
1982	40	+0.36%
1990	41	+0.31%
1999	46	+1.29%
2007	49	+0.79%
2012	52	+1.20%
2017	45	−2.85%
2023	34	−4.56%
Source: INSEE

== See also ==
- Communes of the Côte-d'Or department
