= Canton of Semur-en-Auxois =

Coordinates: 47.49°N 4.33°E

The canton of Semur-en-Auxois is an administrative division of the Côte-d'Or department, eastern France. Its borders were modified at the French canton reorganisation which came into effect in March 2015. Its seat is in Semur-en-Auxois.

It consists of the following communes:

1. Aisy-sous-Thil
2. Arnay-sous-Vitteaux
3. Avosnes
4. Bard-lès-Époisses
5. Beurizot
6. Boussey
7. Brain
8. Braux
9. Brianny
10. Champeau-en-Morvan
11. Champrenault
12. Charigny
13. Charny
14. Chassey
15. Chevannay
16. Clamerey
17. Corrombles
18. Corsaint
19. Courcelles-Frémoy
20. Courcelles-lès-Semur
21. Dampierre-en-Montagne
22. Dompierre-en-Morvan
23. Époisses
24. Fontangy
25. Forléans
26. Genay
27. Gissey-le-Vieil
28. Jeux-lès-Bard
29. Juillenay
30. Juilly
31. Lacour-d'Arcenay
32. Lantilly
33. Magny-la-Ville
34. Marcellois
35. Marcigny-sous-Thil
36. Marcilly-et-Dracy
37. Massingy-lès-Semur
38. Massingy-lès-Vitteaux
39. Millery
40. Missery
41. Molphey
42. Montberthault
43. Montigny-Saint-Barthélemy
44. Montigny-sur-Armançon
45. Montlay-en-Auxois
46. La Motte-Ternant
47. Nan-sous-Thil
48. Noidan
49. Normier
50. Pont-et-Massène
51. Posanges
52. Précy-sous-Thil
53. La Roche-en-Brenil
54. Roilly
55. Rouvray
56. Saffres
57. Saint-Andeux
58. Saint-Didier
59. Sainte-Colombe-en-Auxois
60. Saint-Euphrône
61. Saint-Germain-de-Modéon
62. Saint-Hélier
63. Saint-Mesmin
64. Saint-Thibault
65. Saulieu
66. Semur-en-Auxois
67. Sincey-lès-Rouvray
68. Souhey
69. Soussey-sur-Brionne
70. Thoisy-la-Berchère
71. Thorey-sous-Charny
72. Thoste
73. Torcy-et-Pouligny
74. Toutry
75. Uncey-le-Franc
76. Le Val-Larrey
77. Velogny
78. Vesvres
79. Vic-de-Chassenay
80. Vic-sous-Thil
81. Vieux-Château
82. Villargoix
83. Villars-et-Villenotte
84. Villeberny
85. Villeferry
86. Villeneuve-sous-Charigny
87. Villy-en-Auxois
88. Vitteaux
