= Marcellois =

- Commune
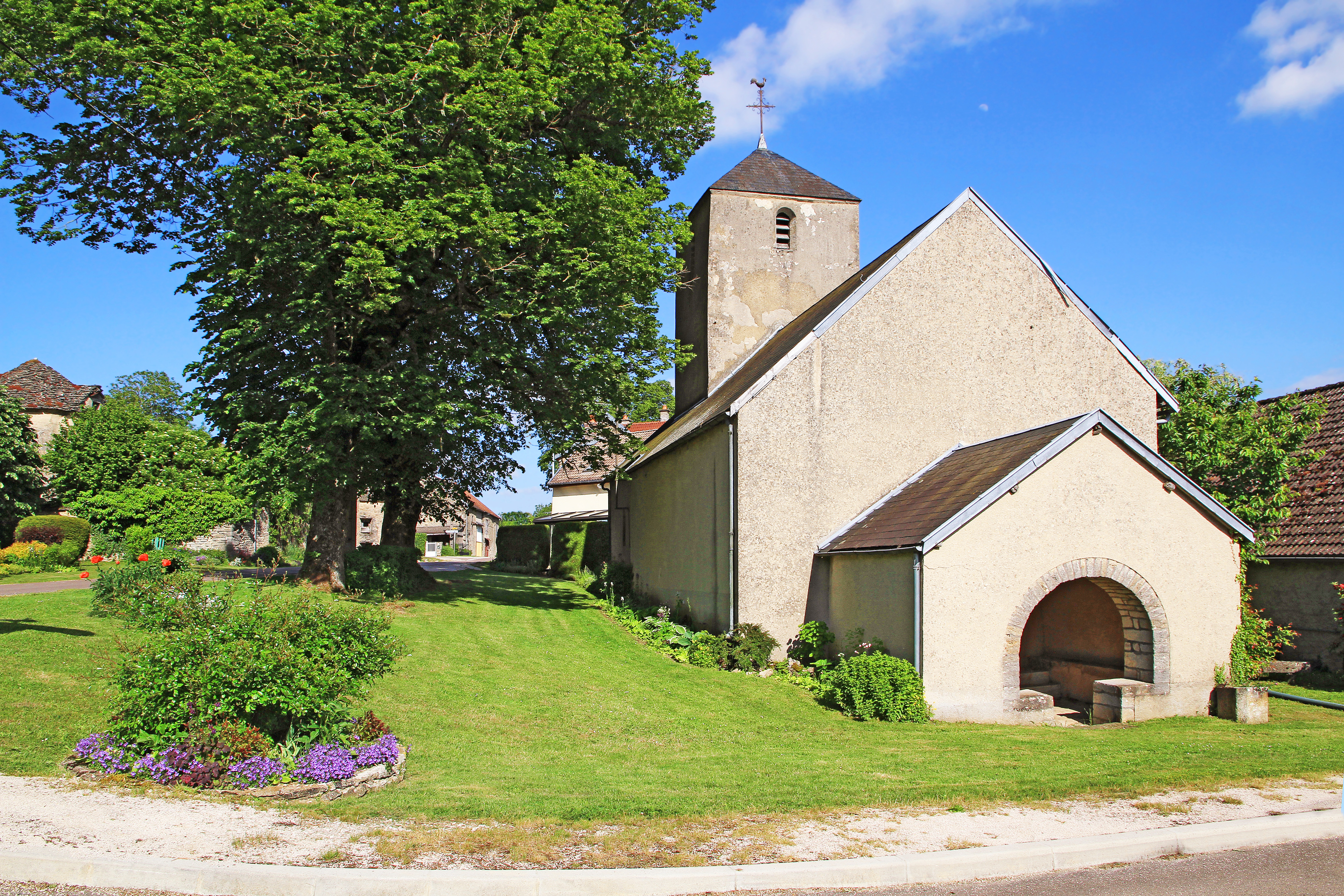
- The church in Marcellois
- Location of Marcellois
- Location within France Location within Bourgogne-Franche-Comté
- Coordinates: 47°20′59″N 4°36′50″E
- Country: France
- Region: Bourgogne-Franche-Comté
- Department: Côte-d'Or
- Arrondissement: Montbard
- Canton: Semur-en-Auxois

Government
  - Mayor (2020–2026): Michel Lagneau
- Area^{1}: 3.66 km^{2} (1.41 sq mi)
- Elevation: 507 m (1,663 ft)
- Highest elevation: 552 m (1,811 ft)
- Lowest elevation: 380 m (1,250 ft)
- Population (2023): 45
  - Density: 12/km^{2} (32/sq mi)
- Time zone: UTC+01:00 (CET)
  - Summer (DST): UTC+02:00 (CEST)
- INSEE/Postal code: 21377 /21350
- ^{1} French Land Register data, which excludes lakes, ponds, glaciers > 1 km^{2} (0.386 sq mi or 247 acres) and river estuaries.

Marcellois is a commune in the Côte-d'Or department in eastern France.

== Population ==
Historical population
Year	Pop.	±% p.a.
1968	35	—
1975	29	−2.65%
1982	24	−2.67%
1990	23	−0.53%
1999	24	+0.47%
2007	30	+2.83%
2012	39	+5.39%
2017	49	+4.67%
2023	45	−1.41%
Source: INSEE

== See also ==
- Communes of the Côte-d'Or department
