= Villeneuve-sous-Charigny =

- Commune
- Location of Villeneuve-sous-Charigny
- Location within France Location within Bourgogne-Franche-Comté
- Coordinates: 47°26′20″N 4°23′46″E
- Country: France
- Region: Bourgogne-Franche-Comté
- Department: Côte-d'Or
- Arrondissement: Montbard
- Canton: Semur-en-Auxois

Government
  - Mayor (2020–2026): Noël Frankelstein
- Area^{1}: 3.24 km^{2} (1.25 sq mi)
- Elevation: 340 m (1,120 ft)
- Highest elevation: 350 m (1,150 ft)
- Lowest elevation: 314 m (1,030 ft)
- Population (2023): 82
  - Density: 25/km^{2} (66/sq mi)
- Time zone: UTC+01:00 (CET)
  - Summer (DST): UTC+02:00 (CEST)
- INSEE/Postal code: 21696 /21140
- ^{1} French Land Register data, which excludes lakes, ponds, glaciers > 1 km^{2} (0.386 sq mi or 247 acres) and river estuaries.

Villeneuve-sous-Charigny (French pronunciation: [vilnœv su ʃaʁiɲi]) is a commune in the Côte-d'Or department in eastern France.

== Population ==
Historical population
Year	Pop.	±% p.a.
1968	41	—
1975	40	−0.35%
1982	76	+9.60%
1990	92	+2.42%
1999	83	−1.14%
2007	95	+1.70%
2012	90	−1.08%
2017	94	+0.87%
2023	82	−2.25%
Source: INSEE

== See also ==
- Communes of the Côte-d'Or department
