= Saint-Andeux =

- Commune
- Location of Saint-Andeux
- Location within France Location within Bourgogne-Franche-Comté
- Coordinates: 47°24′04″N 4°05′59″E
- Country: France
- Region: Bourgogne-Franche-Comté
- Department: Côte-d'Or
- Arrondissement: Montbard
- Canton: Semur-en-Auxois
- Intercommunality: CC Saulieu-Morvan

Government
  - Mayor (2020–2026): Françoise Guerrier
- Area^{1}: 11.84 km^{2} (4.57 sq mi)
- Elevation: 391 m (1,283 ft)
- Highest elevation: 498 m (1,634 ft)
- Lowest elevation: 308 m (1,010 ft)
- Population (2023): 115
  - Density: 9.71/km^{2} (25.2/sq mi)
- Time zone: UTC+01:00 (CET)
  - Summer (DST): UTC+02:00 (CEST)
- INSEE/Postal code: 21538 /21530
- ^{1} French Land Register data, which excludes lakes, ponds, glaciers > 1 km^{2} (0.386 sq mi or 247 acres) and river estuaries.

Saint-Andeux (French pronunciation: [sɛ̃.t‿ɑ̃dø]) is a commune in the Côte-d'Or department in eastern France.

== Population ==
Historical population
Year	Pop.	±% p.a.
1968	136	—
1975	121	−1.66%
1982	92	−3.84%
1990	93	+0.14%
1999	128	+3.61%
2007	125	−0.30%
2012	130	+0.79%
2017	131	+0.15%
2023	115	−2.15%
Source: INSEE

== See also ==
- Communes of the Côte-d'Or department
- Parc naturel régional du Morvan
