= Villeberny =

- Commune
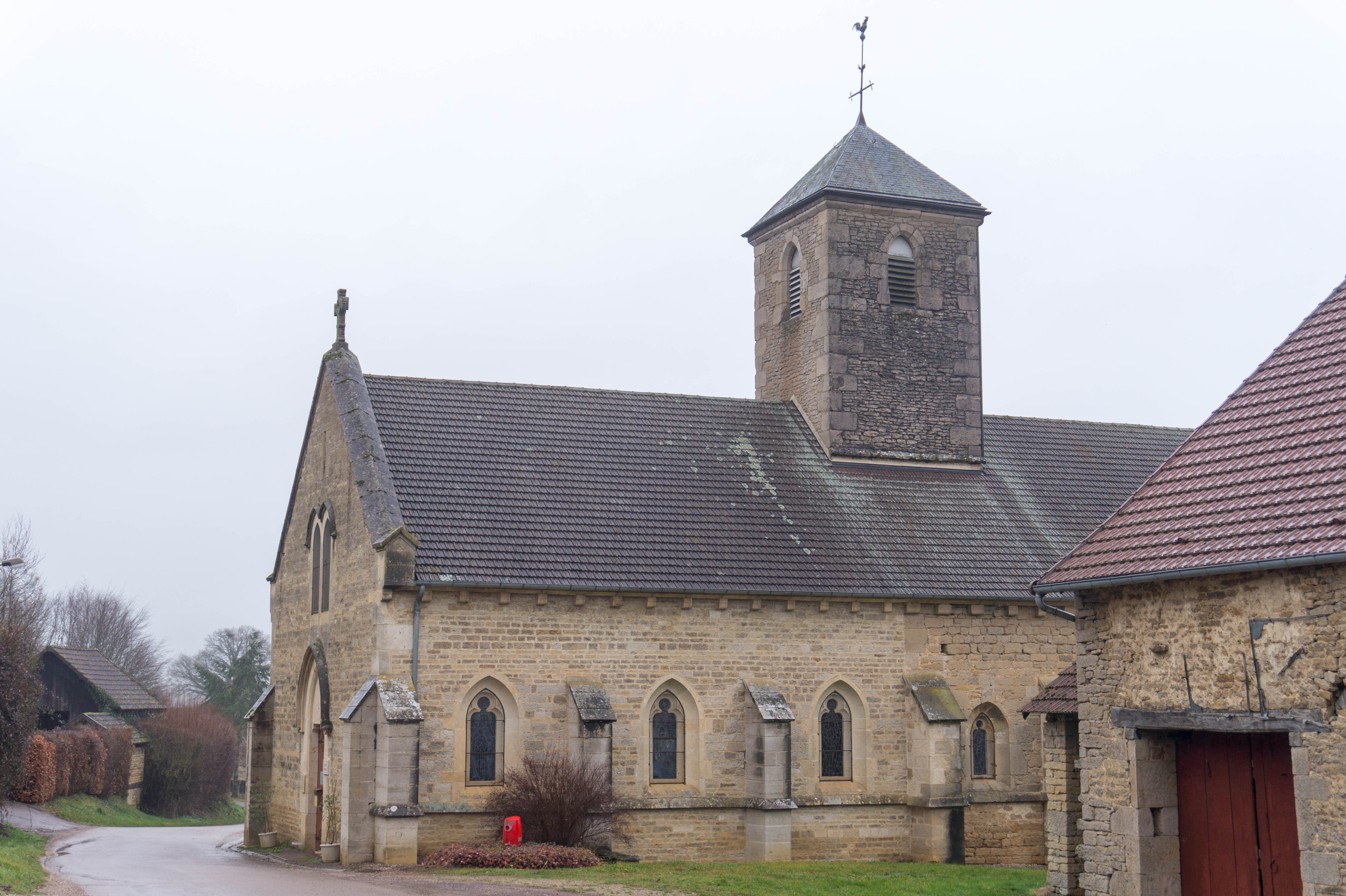
- The church in Villeberny
- Location of Villeberny
- Location within France Location within Bourgogne-Franche-Comté
- Coordinates: 47°26′16″N 4°36′00″E
- Country: France
- Region: Bourgogne-Franche-Comté
- Department: Côte-d'Or
- Arrondissement: Montbard
- Canton: Semur-en-Auxois
- Intercommunality: Terres d'Auxois

Government
  - Mayor (2020–2026): Serge Pissot
- Area^{1}: 12.90 km^{2} (4.98 sq mi)
- Elevation: 346 m (1,135 ft)
- Highest elevation: 507 m (1,663 ft)
- Lowest elevation: 308 m (1,010 ft)
- Population (2023): 103
  - Density: 7.98/km^{2} (20.7/sq mi)
- Time zone: UTC+01:00 (CET)
  - Summer (DST): UTC+02:00 (CEST)
- INSEE/Postal code: 21690 /21690
- ^{1} French Land Register data, which excludes lakes, ponds, glaciers > 1 km^{2} (0.386 sq mi or 247 acres) and river estuaries.

Villeberny (French pronunciation: [vilbɛʁni]) is a commune in the Côte-d'Or department in eastern France.

== Population ==
Historical population
Year	Pop.	±% p.a.
1968	124	—
1975	97	−3.45%
1982	93	−0.60%
1990	83	−1.41%
1999	74	−1.27%
2007	82	+1.29%
2012	90	+1.88%
2017	91	+0.22%
2023	103	+2.09%
Source: INSEE

== See also ==
- Communes of the Côte-d'Or department
