= Saint-Euphrône =

- Commune
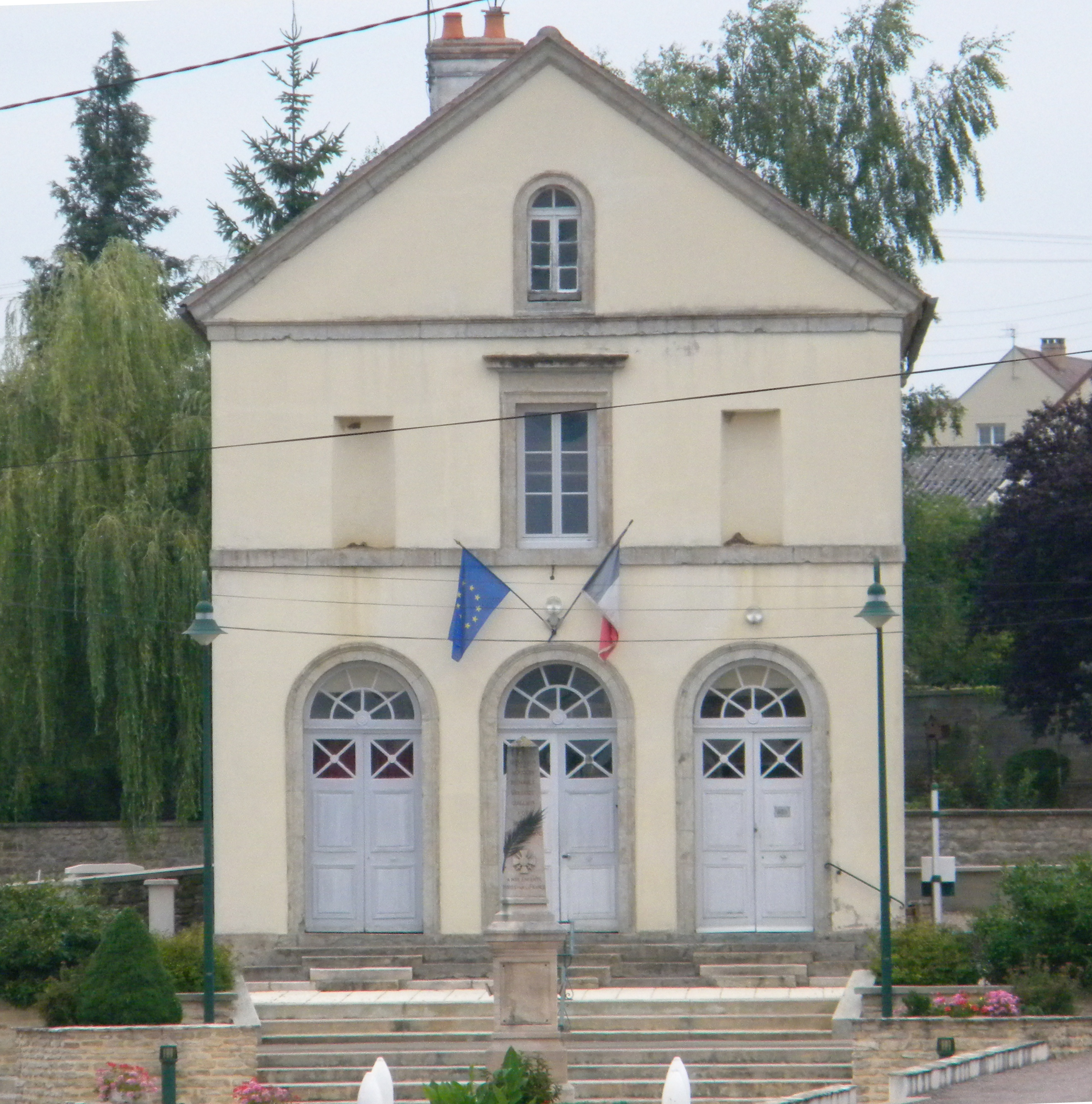
- Town hall
- Location of Saint-Euphrône
- Location within France Location within Bourgogne-Franche-Comté
- Coordinates: 47°28′43″N 4°22′52″E
- Country: France
- Region: Bourgogne-Franche-Comté
- Department: Côte-d'Or
- Arrondissement: Montbard
- Canton: Semur-en-Auxois

Government
  - Mayor (2020–2026): Benoist Boutier
- Area^{1}: 11.04 km^{2} (4.26 sq mi)
- Elevation: 303 m (994 ft)
- Highest elevation: 351 m (1,152 ft)
- Lowest elevation: 280 m (920 ft)
- Population (2023): 225
  - Density: 20.4/km^{2} (52.8/sq mi)
- Time zone: UTC+01:00 (CET)
  - Summer (DST): UTC+02:00 (CEST)
- INSEE/Postal code: 21547 /21140
- ^{1} French Land Register data, which excludes lakes, ponds, glaciers > 1 km^{2} (0.386 sq mi or 247 acres) and river estuaries.

Saint-Euphrône (French pronunciation: [sɛ̃.t‿øfʁon]) is a commune in the Côte-d'Or department in eastern France.

== Population ==
Historical population
Year	Pop.	±% p.a.
1968	121	—
1975	107	−1.74%
1982	135	+3.38%
1990	170	+2.92%
1999	172	+0.13%
2007	198	+1.78%
2012	200	+0.20%
2017	178	−2.30%
2023	225	+3.98%
Source: INSEE

== See also ==
- Communes of the Côte-d'Or department
