= Velogny =

- Commune
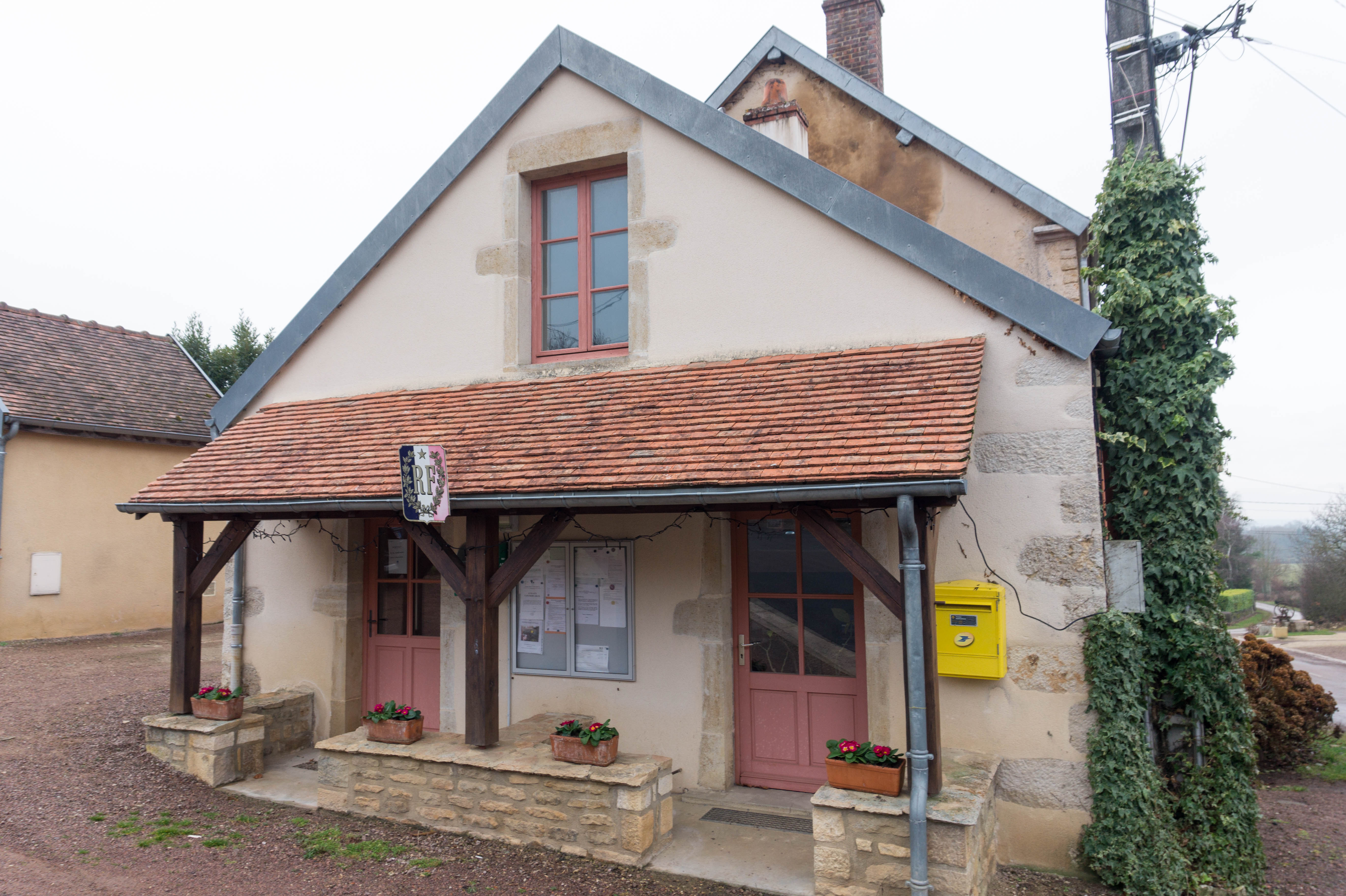
- The town hall in Velogny
- Location of Velogny
- Location within France Location within Bourgogne-Franche-Comté
- Coordinates: 47°24′16″N 4°27′45″E
- Country: France
- Region: Bourgogne-Franche-Comté
- Department: Côte-d'Or
- Arrondissement: Montbard
- Canton: Semur-en-Auxois

Government
  - Mayor (2020–2026): Alain Marie
- Area^{1}: 4.03 km^{2} (1.56 sq mi)
- Elevation: 400 m (1,300 ft)
- Highest elevation: 498 m (1,634 ft)
- Lowest elevation: 345 m (1,132 ft)
- Population (2023): 33
  - Density: 8.2/km^{2} (21/sq mi)
- Time zone: UTC+01:00 (CET)
  - Summer (DST): UTC+02:00 (CEST)
- INSEE/Postal code: 21662 /21350
- ^{1} French Land Register data, which excludes lakes, ponds, glaciers > 1 km^{2} (0.386 sq mi or 247 acres) and river estuaries.

Velogny (French pronunciation: [vəlɔɲi]) is a commune in the Côte-d'Or department in eastern France.

== Population ==
Historical population
Year	Pop.	±% p.a.
1968	26	—
1975	26	+0.00%
1982	25	−0.56%
1990	43	+7.01%
1999	32	−3.23%
2007	36	+1.48%
2012	36	+0.00%
2017	35	−0.56%
2023	33	−0.98%
Source: INSEE

== See also ==
- Communes of the Côte-d'Or department
