= Brain, Côte-d'Or =

Brain
- Commune
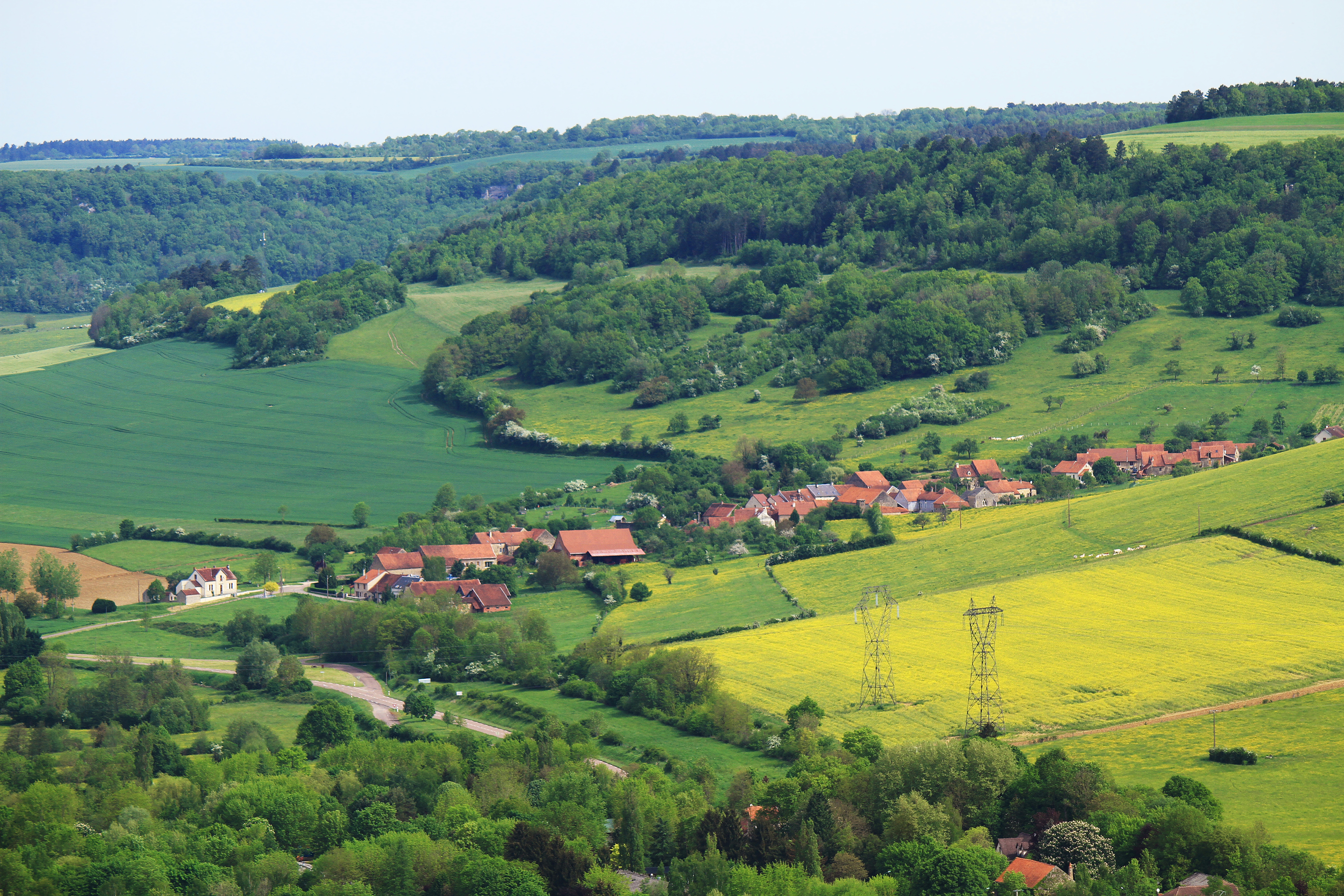
- A general view of Brain
- Location of Brain
- Location within France Location within Bourgogne-Franche-Comté
- Coordinates: 47°27′51″N 4°30′25″E
- Country: France
- Region: Bourgogne-Franche-Comté
- Department: Côte-d'Or
- Arrondissement: Montbard
- Canton: Semur-en-Auxois

Government
  - Mayor (2020–2026): Monique Failly
- Area^{1}: 4.13 km^{2} (1.59 sq mi)
- Elevation: 285 m (935 ft)
- Highest elevation: 469 m (1,539 ft)
- Lowest elevation: 269 m (883 ft)
- Population (2023): 36
  - Density: 8.7/km^{2} (23/sq mi)
- Time zone: UTC+01:00 (CET)
  - Summer (DST): UTC+02:00 (CEST)
- INSEE/Postal code: 21100 /21350
- ^{1} French Land Register data, which excludes lakes, ponds, glaciers > 1 km^{2} (0.386 sq mi or 247 acres) and river estuaries.

Brain (French pronunciation: [bʁɛ̃]) is a commune in the Côte-d'Or department in eastern France.

== Population ==
Historical population
Year	Pop.	±% p.a.
1968	42	—
1975	30	−4.69%
1982	40	+4.20%
1990	35	−1.66%
1999	23	−4.56%
2007	26	+1.54%
2012	30	+2.90%
2017	35	+3.13%
2023	36	+0.47%
Source: INSEE

== See also ==
- Communes of the Côte-d'Or department
