= Charigny =

- Commune
- Location of Charigny
- Location within France Location within Bourgogne-Franche-Comté
- Coordinates: 47°25′55″N 4°25′32″E
- Country: France
- Region: Bourgogne-Franche-Comté
- Department: Côte-d'Or
- Arrondissement: Montbard
- Canton: Semur-en-Auxois

Government
  - Mayor (2020–2026): Éric Collin
- Area^{1}: 3.07 km^{2} (1.19 sq mi)
- Elevation: 386 m (1,266 ft)
- Highest elevation: 477 m (1,565 ft)
- Lowest elevation: 334 m (1,096 ft)
- Population (2023): 36
  - Density: 12/km^{2} (30/sq mi)
- Time zone: UTC+01:00 (CET)
  - Summer (DST): UTC+02:00 (CEST)
- INSEE/Postal code: 21145 /21140
- ^{1} French Land Register data, which excludes lakes, ponds, glaciers > 1 km^{2} (0.386 sq mi or 247 acres) and river estuaries.

Charigny (French pronunciation: [ʃaʁiɲi]) is a commune in the Côte-d'Or department in eastern France.

== Population ==
Historical population
Year	Pop.	±% p.a.
1968	41	—
1975	46	+1.66%
1982	41	−1.63%
1990	37	−1.27%
1999	35	−0.62%
2007	41	+2.00%
2012	37	−2.03%
2017	34	−1.68%
2023	36	+0.96%
Source: INSEE

== See also ==
- Communes of the Côte-d'Or department
