= Montlay-en-Auxois =

- Commune
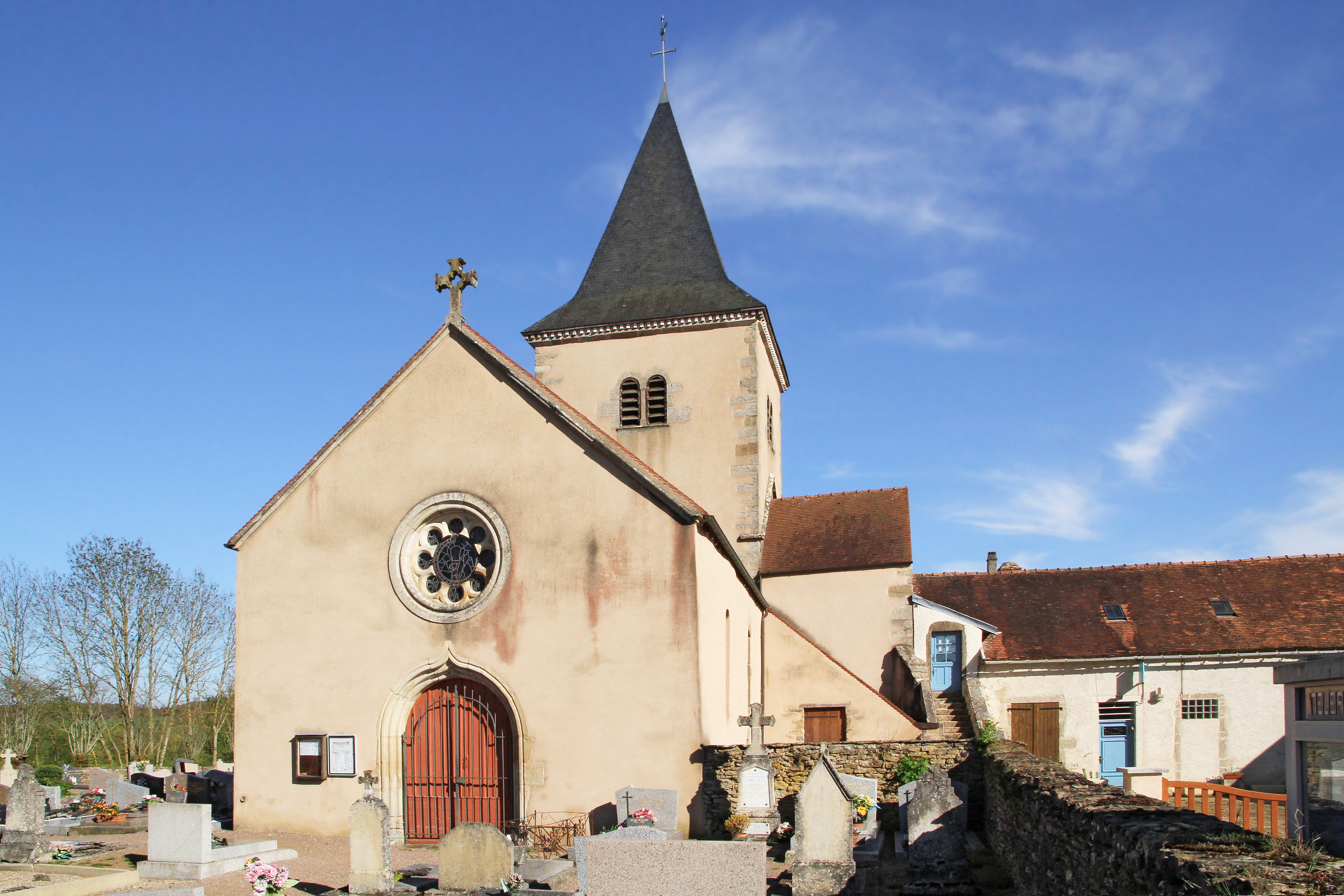
- The church in Montlay-en-Auxois
- Location of Montlay-en-Auxois
- Location within France Location within Bourgogne-Franche-Comté
- Coordinates: 47°21′02″N 4°16′53″E
- Country: France
- Region: Bourgogne-Franche-Comté
- Department: Côte-d'Or
- Arrondissement: Montbard
- Canton: Semur-en-Auxois

Government
  - Mayor (2020–2026): Xavier Troullier
- Area^{1}: 17.36 km^{2} (6.70 sq mi)
- Elevation: 384 m (1,260 ft)
- Highest elevation: 527 m (1,729 ft)
- Lowest elevation: 336 m (1,102 ft)
- Population (2023): 199
  - Density: 11.5/km^{2} (29.7/sq mi)
- Time zone: UTC+01:00 (CET)
  - Summer (DST): UTC+02:00 (CEST)
- INSEE/Postal code: 21434 /21210
- ^{1} French Land Register data, which excludes lakes, ponds, glaciers > 1 km^{2} (0.386 sq mi or 247 acres) and river estuaries.

Montlay-en-Auxois (French pronunciation: [mɔ̃lɛ ɑ̃.n‿o(k)swa], lit. 'Montlay in Auxois') is a commune in the Côte-d'Or department in eastern France.

== Population ==
Historical population
Year	Pop.	±% p.a.
1968	155	—
1975	134	−2.06%
1982	113	−2.41%
1990	120	+0.75%
1999	151	+2.59%
2007	154	+0.25%
2012	154	+0.00%
2017	185	+3.74%
2023	199	+1.22%
Source: INSEE

== See also ==
- Communes of the Côte-d'Or department
- Parc naturel régional du Morvan
