= Pont-et-Massène =

- Commune
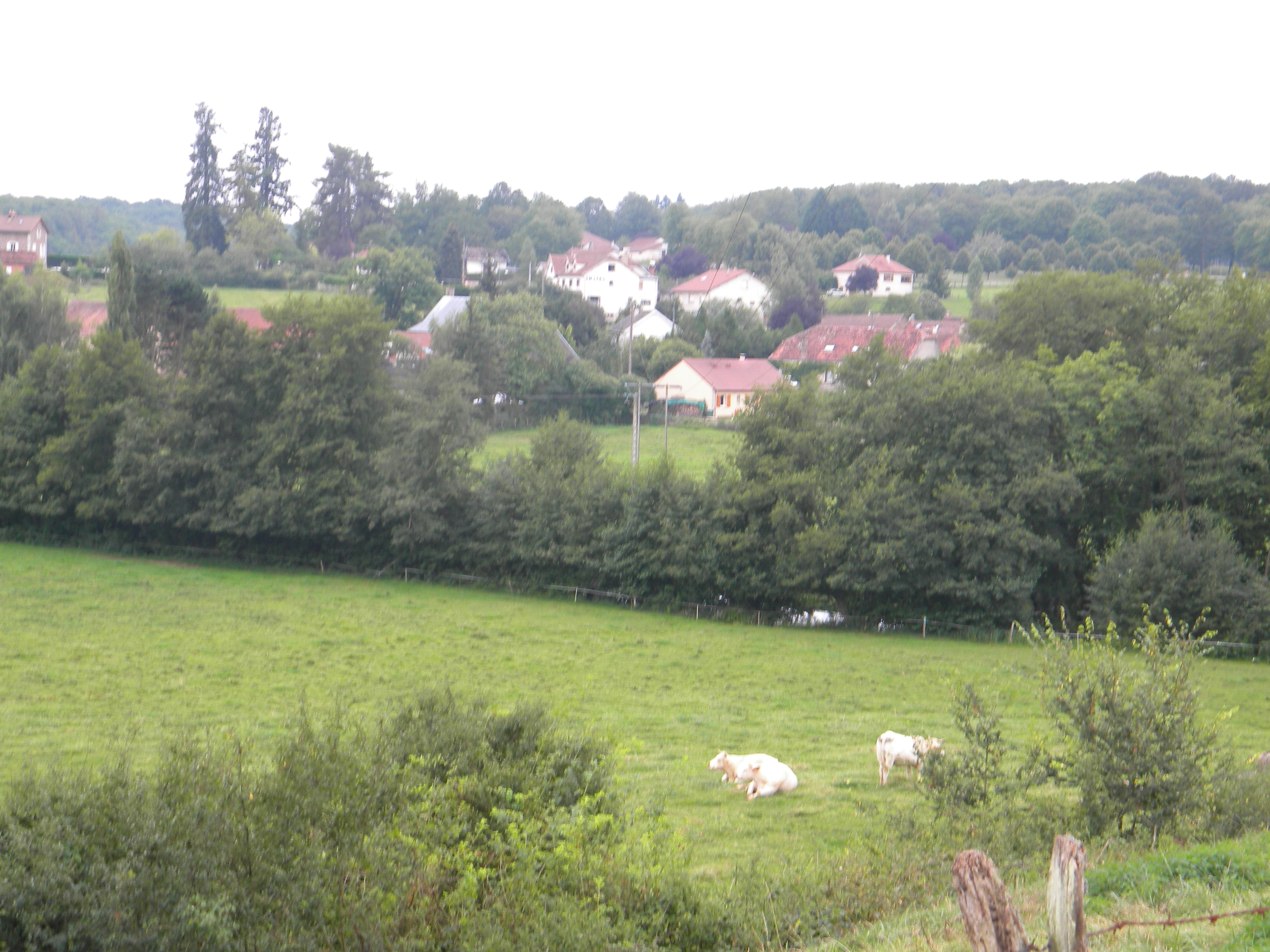
- A general view of Pont-et-Massène
- Location of Pont-et-Massène
- Location within France Location within Bourgogne-Franche-Comté
- Coordinates: 47°28′16″N 4°21′30″E
- Country: France
- Region: Bourgogne-Franche-Comté
- Department: Côte-d'Or
- Arrondissement: Montbard
- Canton: Semur-en-Auxois

Government
  - Mayor (2020–2026): Patrick Roux
- Area^{1}: 6.11 km^{2} (2.36 sq mi)
- Elevation: 280 m (920 ft)
- Highest elevation: 344 m (1,129 ft)
- Lowest elevation: 262 m (860 ft)
- Population (2023): 187
  - Density: 30.6/km^{2} (79.3/sq mi)
- Time zone: UTC+01:00 (CET)
  - Summer (DST): UTC+02:00 (CEST)
- INSEE/Postal code: 21497 /21140
- ^{1} French Land Register data, which excludes lakes, ponds, glaciers > 1 km^{2} (0.386 sq mi or 247 acres) and river estuaries.

Pont-et-Massène (French pronunciation: [pɔ̃ e masɛn]) is a commune in the Côte-d'Or department in eastern France.

== Population ==
Historical population
Year	Pop.	±% p.a.
1968	86	—
1975	93	+1.12%
1982	104	+1.61%
1990	137	+3.50%
1999	173	+2.63%
2007	197	+1.64%
2012	204	+0.70%
2017	175	−3.02%
2023	187	+1.11%
Source: INSEE

== See also ==
- Communes of the Côte-d'Or department
