= Champrenault =

- Commune
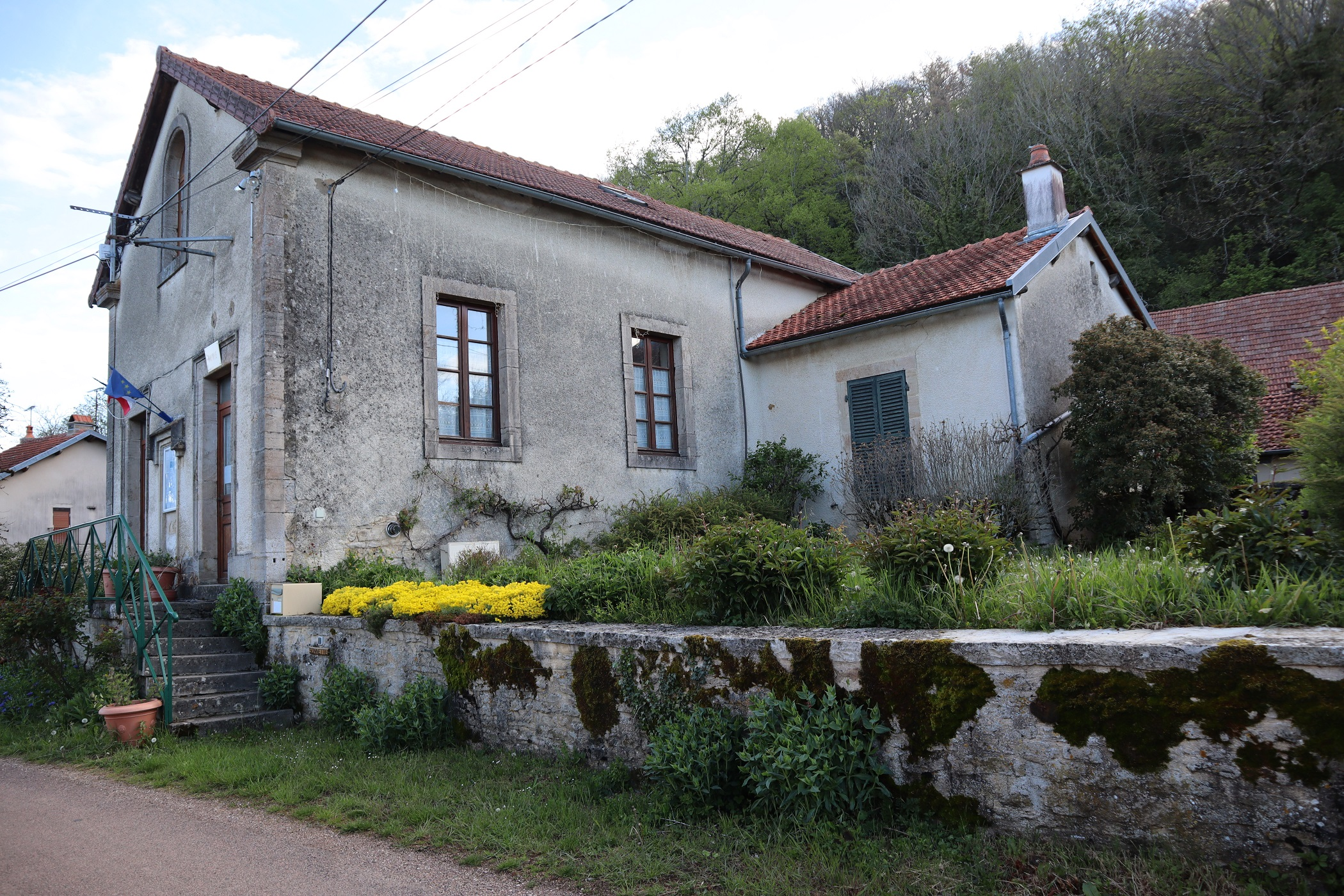
- Town hall
- Location of Champrenault
- Location within France Location within Bourgogne-Franche-Comté
- Coordinates: 47°24′02″N 4°40′52″E
- Country: France
- Region: Bourgogne-Franche-Comté
- Department: Côte-d'Or
- Arrondissement: Montbard
- Canton: Semur-en-Auxois

Government
  - Mayor (2020–2026): Hélène Faivre
- Area^{1}: 4.18 km^{2} (1.61 sq mi)
- Elevation: 520 m (1,710 ft)
- Highest elevation: 535 m (1,755 ft)
- Lowest elevation: 364 m (1,194 ft)
- Population (2023): 38
  - Density: 9.1/km^{2} (24/sq mi)
- Time zone: UTC+01:00 (CET)
  - Summer (DST): UTC+02:00 (CEST)
- INSEE/Postal code: 21141 /21690
- ^{1} French Land Register data, which excludes lakes, ponds, glaciers > 1 km^{2} (0.386 sq mi or 247 acres) and river estuaries.

Champrenault (French pronunciation: [ʃɑ̃pʁəno]) is a commune in the Côte-d'Or department in eastern France.

== Population ==
Historical population
Year	Pop.	±% p.a.
1968	38	—
1975	36	−0.77%
1982	37	+0.39%
1990	49	+3.57%
1999	41	−1.96%
2007	31	−3.43%
2012	31	+0.00%
2017	34	+1.86%
2023	38	+1.87%
Source: INSEE

== See also ==
- Communes of the Côte-d'Or department
