= Soussey-sur-Brionne =

- Commune
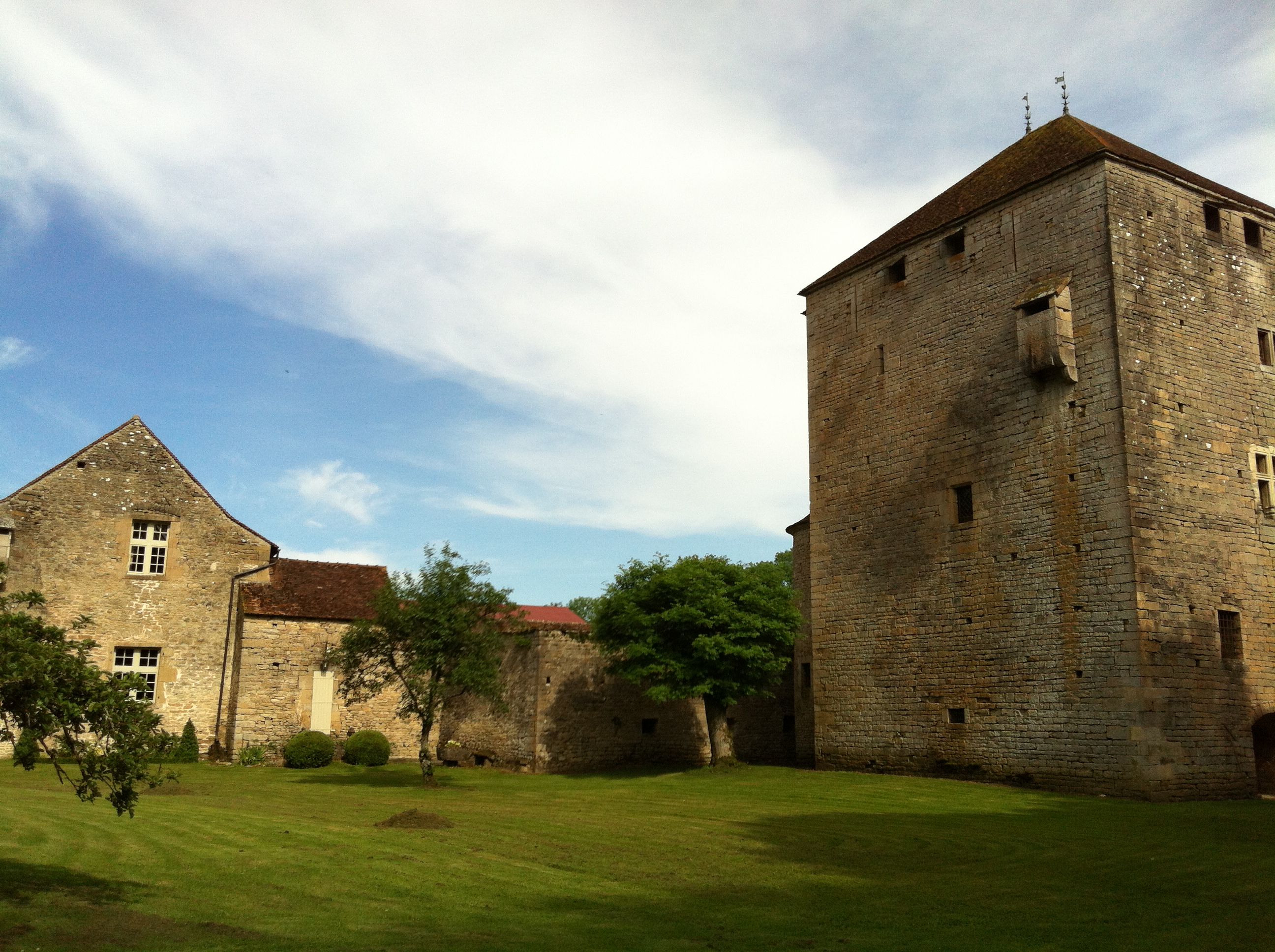
- Chateau
- Location of Soussey-sur-Brionne
- Location within France Location within Bourgogne-Franche-Comté
- Coordinates: 47°19′35″N 4°31′55″E
- Country: France
- Region: Bourgogne-Franche-Comté
- Department: Côte-d'Or
- Arrondissement: Montbard
- Canton: Semur-en-Auxois

Government
  - Mayor (2020–2026): Yves Lanier
- Area^{1}: 14.61 km^{2} (5.64 sq mi)
- Elevation: 349 m (1,145 ft)
- Highest elevation: 525 m (1,722 ft)
- Lowest elevation: 348 m (1,142 ft)
- Population (2023): 155
  - Density: 10.6/km^{2} (27.5/sq mi)
- Time zone: UTC+01:00 (CET)
  - Summer (DST): UTC+02:00 (CEST)
- INSEE/Postal code: 21613 /21350
- ^{1} French Land Register data, which excludes lakes, ponds, glaciers > 1 km^{2} (0.386 sq mi or 247 acres) and river estuaries.

Soussey-sur-Brionne (French pronunciation: [susɛ syʁ bʁijɔn]) is a commune in the Côte-d'Or department in eastern France.

== Population ==
Historical population
Year	Pop.	±% p.a.
1968	128	—
1975	121	−0.80%
1982	108	−1.61%
1990	104	−0.47%
1999	102	−0.22%
2007	129	+2.98%
2012	142	+1.94%
2017	153	+1.50%
2023	155	+0.22%
Source: INSEE

== See also ==
- Communes of the Côte-d'Or department
