= Boussey =

- Commune
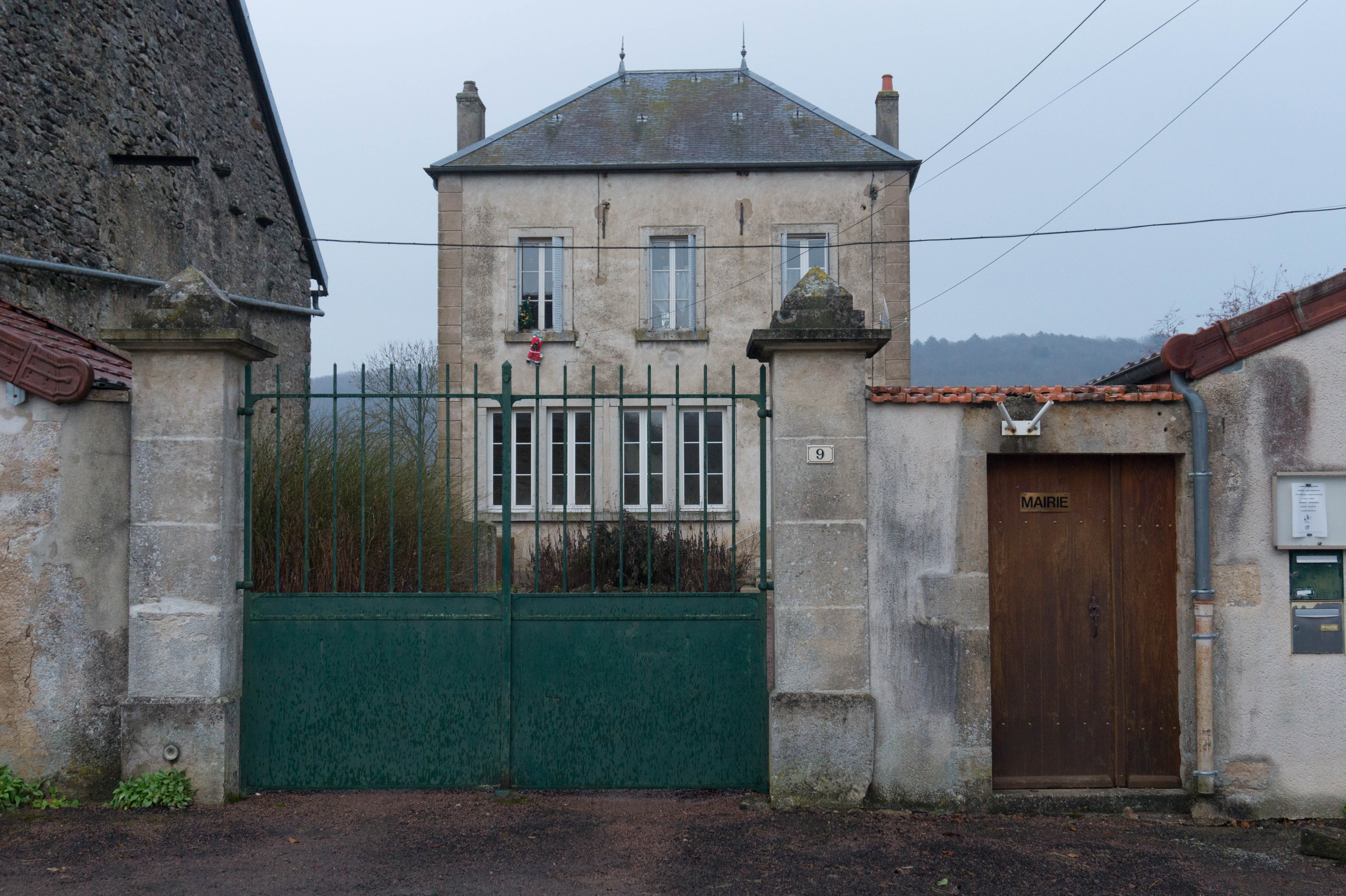
- The town hall in Boussey
- Location of Boussey
- Location within France Location within Bourgogne-Franche-Comté
- Coordinates: 47°22′24″N 4°33′15″E
- Country: France
- Region: Bourgogne-Franche-Comté
- Department: Côte-d'Or
- Arrondissement: Montbard
- Canton: Semur-en-Auxois

Government
  - Mayor (2020–2026): Thierry Bertholle
- Area^{1}: 5.57 km^{2} (2.15 sq mi)
- Elevation: 350 m (1,150 ft)
- Highest elevation: 508 m (1,667 ft)
- Lowest elevation: 324 m (1,063 ft)
- Population (2023): 31
  - Density: 5.6/km^{2} (14/sq mi)
- Time zone: UTC+01:00 (CET)
  - Summer (DST): UTC+02:00 (CEST)
- INSEE/Postal code: 21097 /21350
- ^{1} French Land Register data, which excludes lakes, ponds, glaciers > 1 km^{2} (0.386 sq mi or 247 acres) and river estuaries.

Boussey (French pronunciation: [busɛ]) is a commune in the Côte-d'Or department in eastern France.

== Population ==
Historical population
Year	Pop.	±% p.a.
1968	63	—
1975	58	−1.17%
1982	47	−2.96%
1990	43	−1.11%
1999	45	+0.51%
2007	30	−4.94%
2012	31	+0.66%
2017	35	+2.46%
2023	31	−2.00%
Source: INSEE

== See also ==
- Communes of the Côte-d'Or department
