= Villeferry =

- Commune
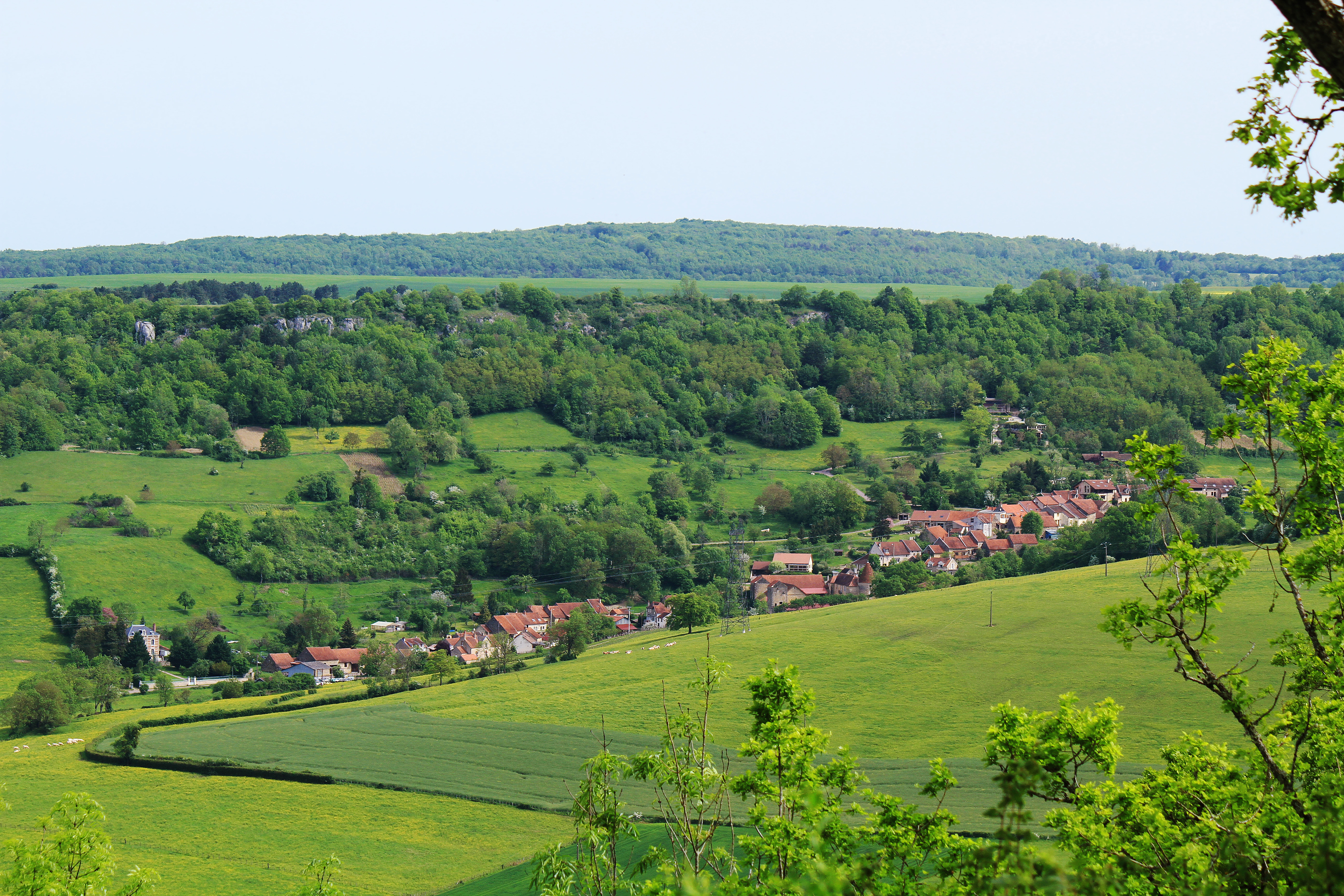
- A general view of Villeferry
- Location of Villeferry
- Location within France Location within Bourgogne-Franche-Comté
- Coordinates: 47°27′22″N 4°30′56″E
- Country: France
- Region: Bourgogne-Franche-Comté
- Department: Côte-d'Or
- Arrondissement: Montbard
- Canton: Semur-en-Auxois

Government
  - Mayor (2020–2026): Pierre Parizot
- Area^{1}: 3.3 km^{2} (1.3 sq mi)
- Elevation: 340 m (1,120 ft)
- Highest elevation: 497 m (1,631 ft)
- Lowest elevation: 308 m (1,010 ft)
- Population (2023): 22
  - Density: 6.7/km^{2} (17/sq mi)
- Time zone: UTC+01:00 (CET)
  - Summer (DST): UTC+02:00 (CEST)
- INSEE/Postal code: 21694 /21350
- ^{1} French Land Register data, which excludes lakes, ponds, glaciers > 1 km^{2} (0.386 sq mi or 247 acres) and river estuaries.

Villeferry (French pronunciation: [vilfɛʁi]) is a commune in the Côte-d'Or department in eastern France.

== Population ==
Historical population
Year	Pop.	±% p.a.
1968	63	—
1975	59	−0.93%
1982	49	−2.62%
1990	35	−4.12%
1999	36	+0.31%
2007	29	−2.67%
2012	31	+1.34%
2017	30	−0.65%
2023	22	−5.04%
Source: INSEE

== See also ==
- Communes of the Côte-d'Or department
