= Uncey-le-Franc =

French commune

- Commune
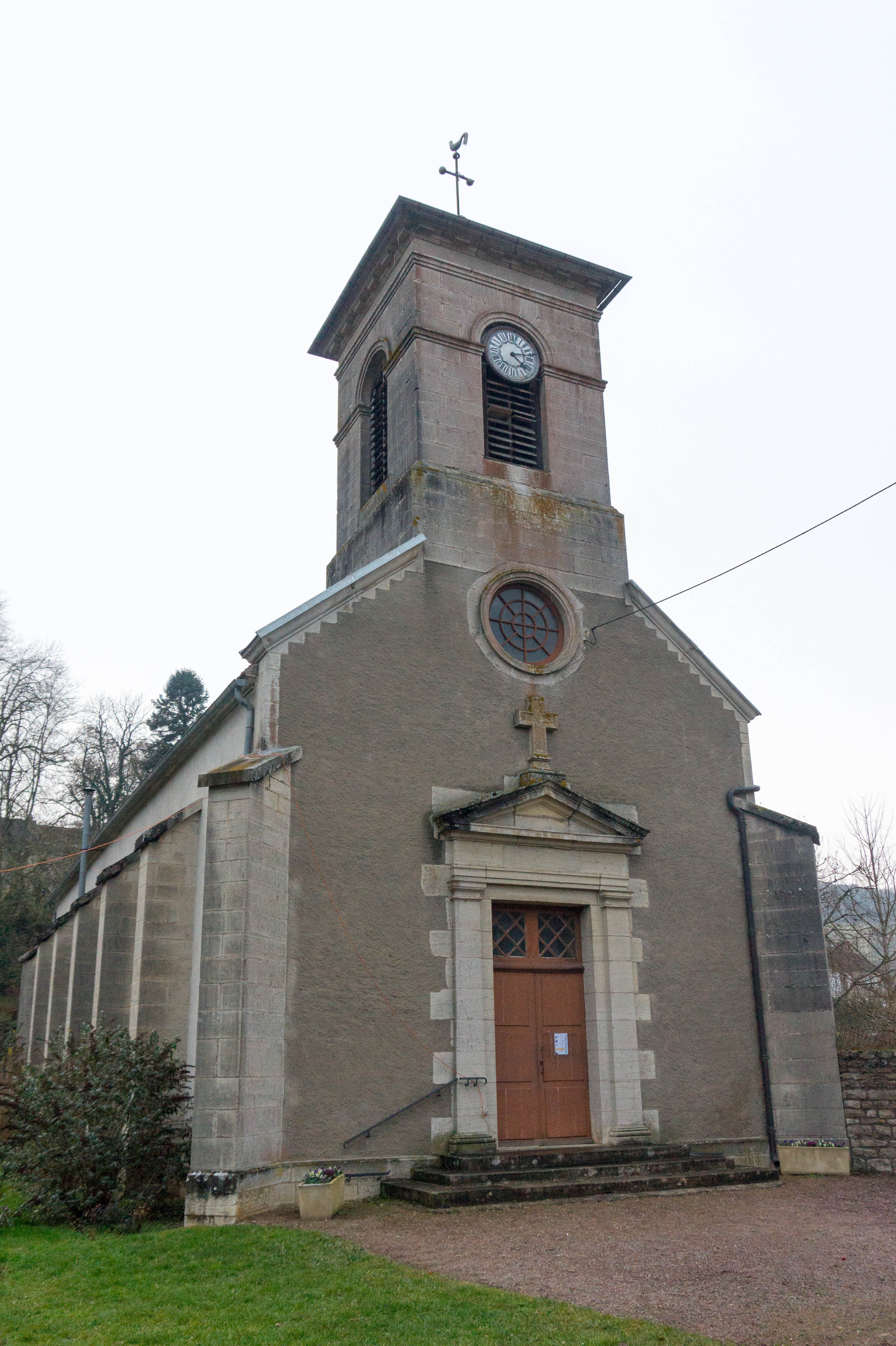
- The church in Uncey
- Location of Uncey-le-Franc
- Location within France Location within Bourgogne-Franche-Comté
- Coordinates: 47°20′45″N 4°34′23″E
- Country: France
- Region: Bourgogne-Franche-Comté
- Department: Côte-d'Or
- Arrondissement: Montbard
- Canton: Semur-en-Auxois

Government
  - Mayor (2020–2026): Pierre Rousseau
- Area^{1}: 9.52 km^{2} (3.68 sq mi)
- Elevation: 400 m (1,300 ft)
- Highest elevation: 539 m (1,768 ft)
- Lowest elevation: 344 m (1,129 ft)
- Population (2023): 47
  - Density: 4.9/km^{2} (13/sq mi)
- Time zone: UTC+01:00 (CET)
  - Summer (DST): UTC+02:00 (CEST)
- INSEE/Postal code: 21649 /21350
- ^{1} French Land Register data, which excludes lakes, ponds, glaciers > 1 km^{2} (0.386 sq mi or 247 acres) and river estuaries.

Uncey-le-Franc (French pronunciation: [œ̃sɛ lə fʁɑ̃]) is a commune in the Côte-d'Or department in eastern France.

== Population ==
Historical population
Year	Pop.	±% p.a.
1968	74	—
1975	61	−2.72%
1982	59	−0.48%
1990	68	+1.79%
1999	54	−2.53%
2007	48	−1.46%
2012	43	−2.18%
2017	54	+4.66%
2023	47	−2.29%
Source: INSEE

== See also ==
- Communes of the Côte-d'Or department
