= Chassey =

- Commune
- Location of Chassey
- Location within France Location within Bourgogne-Franche-Comté
- Coordinates: 47°28′37″N 4°26′46″E
- Country: France
- Region: Bourgogne-Franche-Comté
- Department: Côte-d'Or
- Arrondissement: Montbard
- Canton: Semur-en-Auxois

Government
  - Mayor (2020–2026): Bruno Bauby
- Area^{1}: 6.65 km^{2} (2.57 sq mi)
- Elevation: 300 m (980 ft)
- Highest elevation: 449 m (1,473 ft)
- Lowest elevation: 273 m (896 ft)
- Population (2023): 95
  - Density: 14/km^{2} (37/sq mi)
- Time zone: UTC+01:00 (CET)
  - Summer (DST): UTC+02:00 (CEST)
- INSEE/Postal code: 21151 /21150
- ^{1} French Land Register data, which excludes lakes, ponds, glaciers > 1 km^{2} (0.386 sq mi or 247 acres) and river estuaries.

Chassey (French pronunciation: [ʃasɛ]) is a commune in the Côte-d'Or department in eastern France.

== Population ==
Historical population
Year	Pop.	±% p.a.
1968	109	—
1975	94	−2.09%
1982	88	−0.94%
1990	114	+3.29%
1999	92	−2.35%
2007	94	+0.27%
2012	88	−1.31%
2017	88	+0.00%
2023	95	+1.28%
Source: INSEE

== See also ==
- Communes of the Côte-d'Or department
