= Millery, Côte-d'Or =

Millery
- Commune
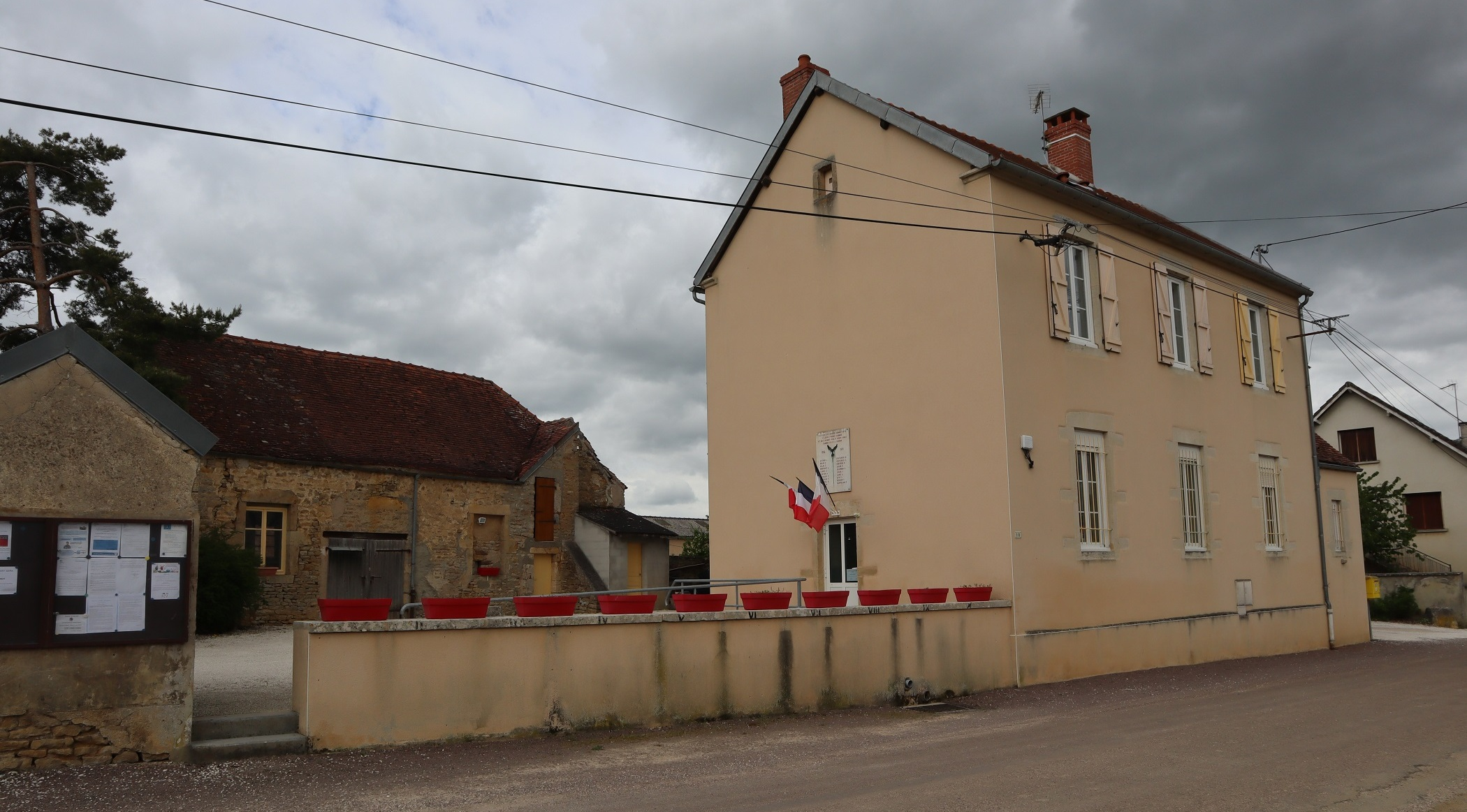
- Millery Town hall

- Coat of arms
- Location of Millery
- Location within France Location within Bourgogne-Franche-Comté
- Coordinates: 47°31′01″N 4°18′57″E
- Country: France
- Region: Bourgogne-Franche-Comté
- Department: Côte-d'Or
- Arrondissement: Montbard
- Canton: Semur-en-Auxois

Government
  - Mayor (2020–2026): Jacky Lüdi
- Area^{1}: 20.86 km^{2} (8.05 sq mi)
- Elevation: 271 m (889 ft)
- Highest elevation: 430 m (1,410 ft)
- Lowest elevation: 227 m (745 ft)
- Population (2023): 410
  - Density: 20/km^{2} (51/sq mi)
- Time zone: UTC+01:00 (CET)
  - Summer (DST): UTC+02:00 (CEST)
- INSEE/Postal code: 21413 /21140
- ^{1} French Land Register data, which excludes lakes, ponds, glaciers > 1 km^{2} (0.386 sq mi or 247 acres) and river estuaries.

Millery is a commune in the Côte-d'Or department in eastern France.

== Population ==
Historical population
Year	Pop.	±% p.a.
1968	207	—
1975	234	+1.77%
1982	281	+2.65%
1990	344	+2.56%
1999	347	+0.10%
2007	371	+0.84%
2012	372	+0.05%
2017	386	+0.74%
2023	410	+1.01%
Source: INSEE

== See also ==
- Communes of the Côte-d'Or department
