= Roilly =

- Commune
- Location of Roilly
- Location within France Location within Bourgogne-Franche-Comté
- Coordinates: 47°25′11″N 4°20′27″E
- Country: France
- Region: Bourgogne-Franche-Comté
- Department: Côte-d'Or
- Arrondissement: Montbard
- Canton: Semur-en-Auxois

Government
  - Mayor (2025–2026): Marie-Paule Hudelot
- Area^{1}: 4.51 km^{2} (1.74 sq mi)
- Elevation: 350 m (1,150 ft)
- Highest elevation: 362 m (1,188 ft)
- Lowest elevation: 327 m (1,073 ft)
- Population (2023): 52
  - Density: 12/km^{2} (30/sq mi)
- Time zone: UTC+01:00 (CET)
  - Summer (DST): UTC+02:00 (CEST)
- INSEE/Postal code: 21529 /21390
- ^{1} French Land Register data, which excludes lakes, ponds, glaciers > 1 km^{2} (0.386 sq mi or 247 acres) and river estuaries.

Roilly (French pronunciation: [ʁwaji]) is a commune in the Côte-d'Or department in central France.

== Population ==
Historical population
Year	Pop.	±% p.a.
1968	46	—
1975	28	−6.85%
1982	27	−0.52%
1990	39	+4.70%
1999	36	−0.89%
2007	33	−1.08%
2012	41	+4.44%
2017	49	+3.63%
2023	52	+1.00%
Source: INSEE

== See also ==
- Communes of the Côte-d'Or department
