= Noidan =

- Commune
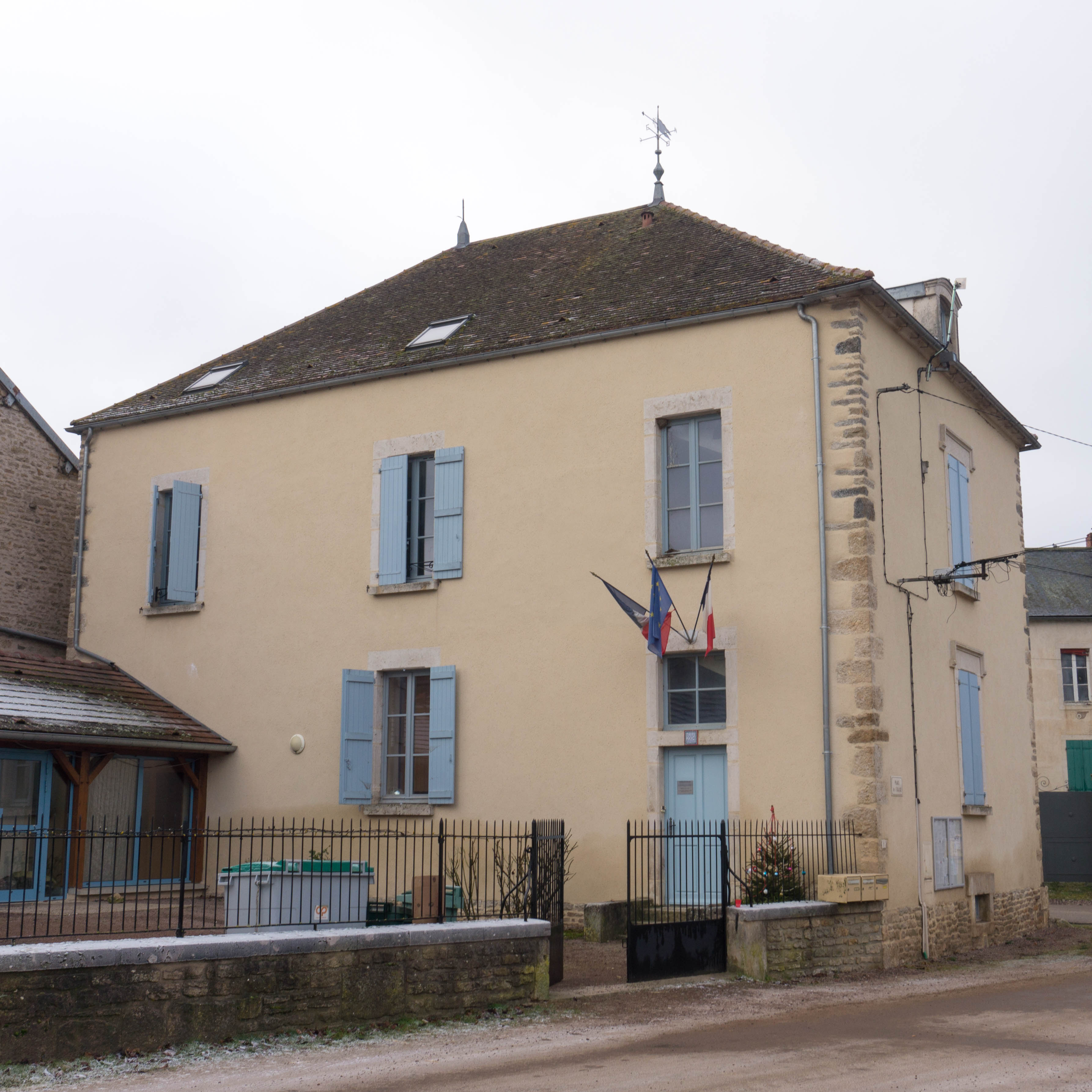
- The town hall in Noidan
- Location of Noidan
- Location within France Location within Bourgogne-Franche-Comté
- Coordinates: 47°20′45″N 4°24′34″E
- Country: France
- Region: Bourgogne-Franche-Comté
- Department: Côte-d'Or
- Arrondissement: Montbard
- Canton: Semur-en-Auxois

Government
  - Mayor (2020–2026): Patrick Pageot
- Area^{1}: 7.87 km^{2} (3.04 sq mi)
- Elevation: 400 m (1,300 ft)
- Highest elevation: 530 m (1,740 ft)
- Lowest elevation: 345 m (1,132 ft)
- Population (2023): 94
  - Density: 12/km^{2} (31/sq mi)
- Time zone: UTC+01:00 (CET)
  - Summer (DST): UTC+02:00 (CEST)
- INSEE/Postal code: 21457 /21390
- ^{1} French Land Register data, which excludes lakes, ponds, glaciers > 1 km^{2} (0.386 sq mi or 247 acres) and river estuaries.

Noidan (French pronunciation: [nwadɑ̃]) is a commune in the Côte-d'Or department in eastern France.

== Population ==
Historical population
Year	Pop.	±% p.a.
1968	111	—
1975	101	−1.34%
1982	93	−1.17%
1990	71	−3.32%
1999	79	+1.19%
2007	89	+1.50%
2012	83	−1.39%
2017	74	−2.27%
2023	94	+4.07%
Source: INSEE

== See also ==
- Communes of the Côte-d'Or department
