= Missery =

- Commune
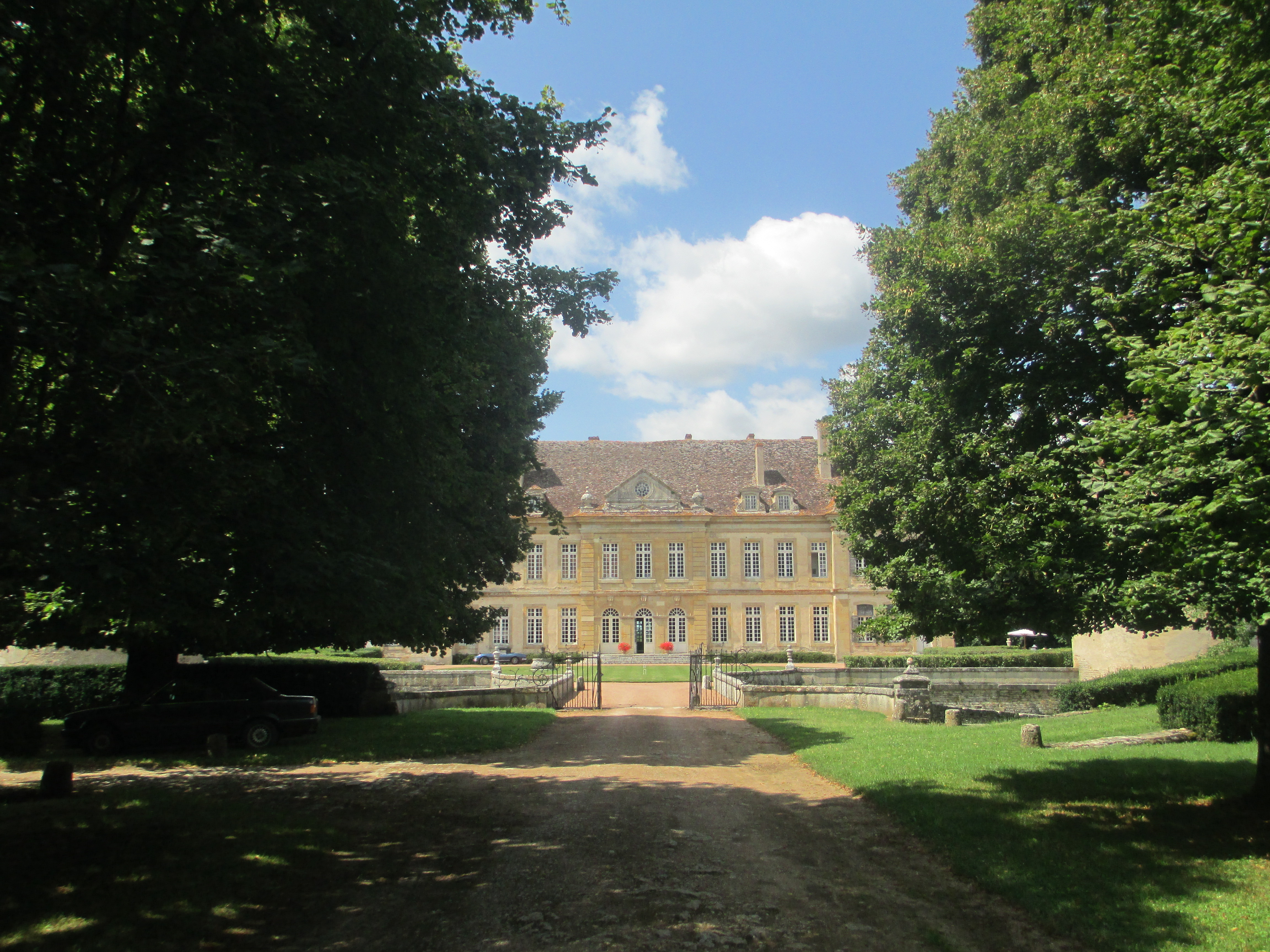
- The chateau in Missery
- Location of Missery
- Location within France Location within Bourgogne-Franche-Comté
- Coordinates: 47°18′31″N 4°22′28″E
- Country: France
- Region: Bourgogne-Franche-Comté
- Department: Côte-d'Or
- Arrondissement: Montbard
- Canton: Semur-en-Auxois

Government
  - Mayor (2020–2026): Rosine Lechaton
- Area^{1}: 9.66 km^{2} (3.73 sq mi)
- Elevation: 400 m (1,300 ft)
- Highest elevation: 560 m (1,840 ft)
- Lowest elevation: 349 m (1,145 ft)
- Population (2023): 105
  - Density: 10.9/km^{2} (28.2/sq mi)
- Time zone: UTC+01:00 (CET)
  - Summer (DST): UTC+02:00 (CEST)
- INSEE/Postal code: 21417 /21210
- ^{1} French Land Register data, which excludes lakes, ponds, glaciers > 1 km^{2} (0.386 sq mi or 247 acres) and river estuaries.

Missery is a commune in the Côte-d'Or department in eastern France.

== Population ==
Historical population
Year	Pop.	±% p.a.
1968	142	—
1975	124	−1.92%
1982	110	−1.70%
1990	105	−0.58%
1999	89	−1.82%
2007	104	+1.97%
2012	104	+0.00%
2017	105	+0.19%
2023	105	+0.00%
Source: INSEE

== See also ==
- Communes of the Côte-d'Or department
