= Juillenay =

- Commune
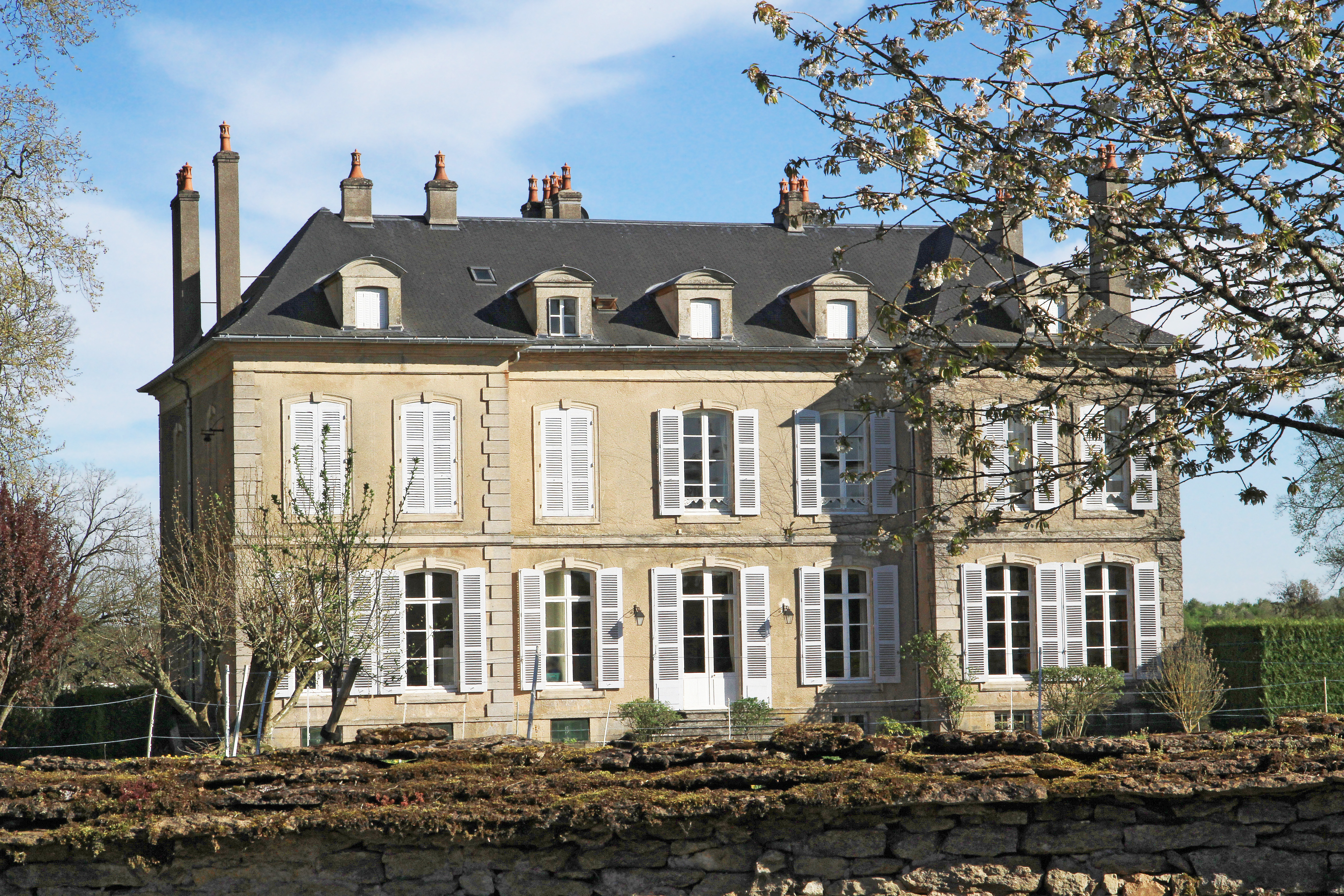
- Chateau
- Location of Juillenay
- Location within France Location within Bourgogne-Franche-Comté
- Coordinates: 47°21′39″N 4°16′37″E
- Country: France
- Region: Bourgogne-Franche-Comté
- Department: Côte-d'Or
- Arrondissement: Montbard
- Canton: Semur-en-Auxois

Government
  - Mayor (2020–2026): Anita Puccinelli
- Area^{1}: 5.53 km^{2} (2.14 sq mi)
- Elevation: 391 m (1,283 ft)
- Highest elevation: 459 m (1,506 ft)
- Lowest elevation: 344 m (1,129 ft)
- Population (2023): 52
  - Density: 9.4/km^{2} (24/sq mi)
- Time zone: UTC+01:00 (CET)
  - Summer (DST): UTC+02:00 (CEST)
- INSEE/Postal code: 21328 /21210
- ^{1} French Land Register data, which excludes lakes, ponds, glaciers > 1 km^{2} (0.386 sq mi or 247 acres) and river estuaries.

Juillenay (French pronunciation: [ʒɥijnɛ]) is a commune in the Côte-d'Or department in eastern France.

== Population ==
Historical population
Year	Pop.	±% p.a.
1968	89	—
1975	67	−3.98%
1982	59	−1.80%
1990	56	−0.65%
1999	50	−1.25%
2007	50	+0.00%
2012	57	+2.66%
2017	43	−5.48%
2023	52	+3.22%
Source: INSEE

== See also ==
- Communes of the Côte-d'Or department
- Parc naturel régional du Morvan
