= Dampierre-en-Montagne =

- Commune
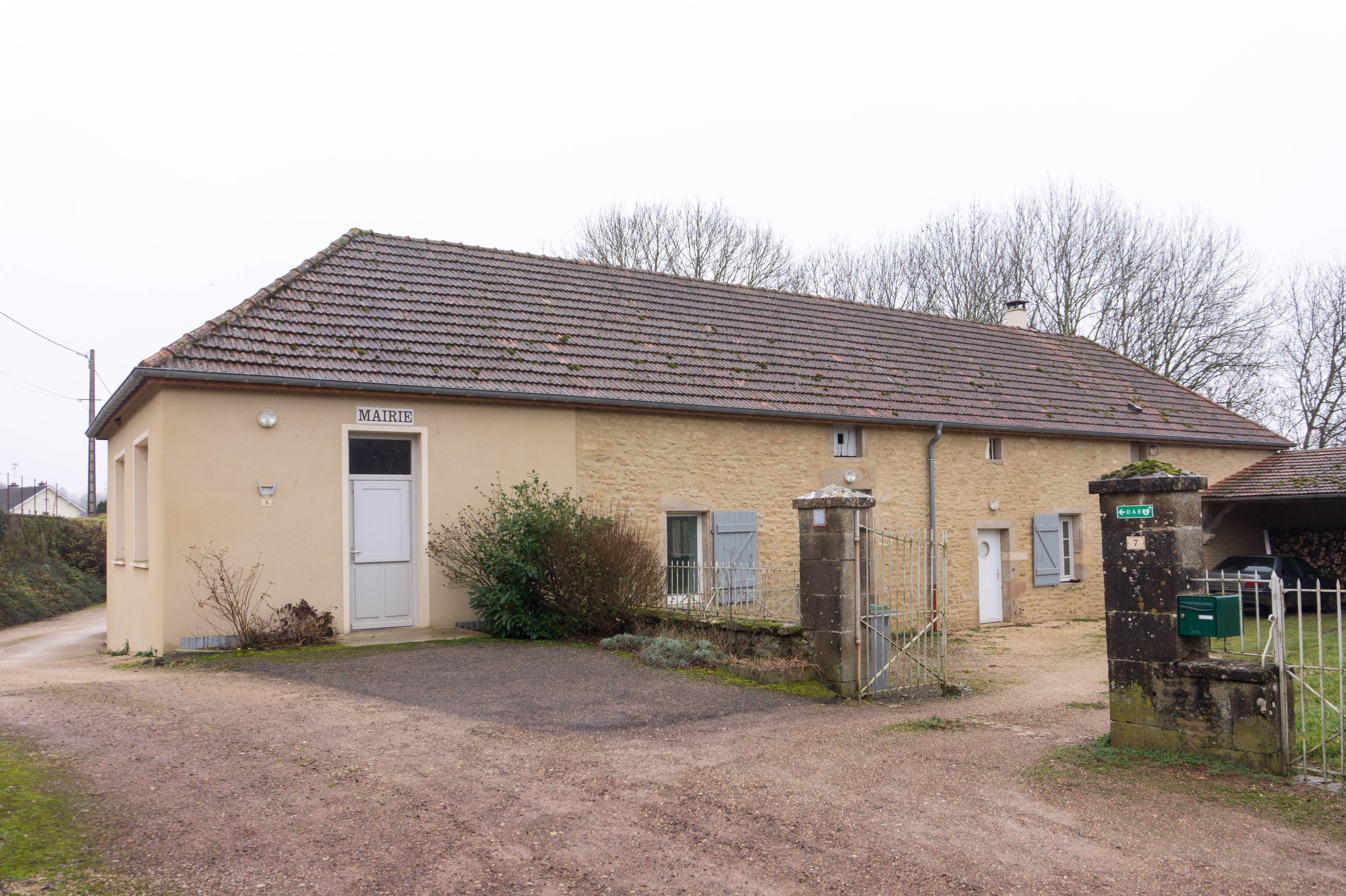
- The town hall in Dampierre
- Location of Dampierre-en-Montagne
- Location within France Location within Bourgogne-Franche-Comté
- Coordinates: 47°26′02″N 4°33′33″E
- Country: France
- Region: Bourgogne-Franche-Comté
- Department: Côte-d'Or
- Arrondissement: Montbard
- Canton: Semur-en-Auxois

Government
  - Mayor (2020–2026): Jean-Pierre Paut
- Area^{1}: 10.36 km^{2} (4.00 sq mi)
- Elevation: 480 m (1,570 ft)
- Highest elevation: 502 m (1,647 ft)
- Lowest elevation: 379 m (1,243 ft)
- Population (2023): 64
  - Density: 6.2/km^{2} (16/sq mi)
- Time zone: UTC+01:00 (CET)
  - Summer (DST): UTC+02:00 (CEST)
- INSEE/Postal code: 21224 /21350
- ^{1} French Land Register data, which excludes lakes, ponds, glaciers > 1 km^{2} (0.386 sq mi or 247 acres) and river estuaries.

Dampierre-en-Montagne (French pronunciation: [dɑ̃pjɛʁ ɑ̃ mɔ̃taɲ]) is a commune in the Côte-d'Or department in Eastern France.

== Population ==
Historical population
Year	Pop.	±% p.a.
1968	71	—
1975	68	−0.61%
1982	66	−0.43%
1990	56	−2.03%
1999	68	+2.18%
2007	74	+1.06%
2012	82	+2.07%
2017	73	−2.30%
2023	64	−2.17%
Source: INSEE

== See also ==
- Communes of the Côte-d'Or department
