= Brianny =

- Commune
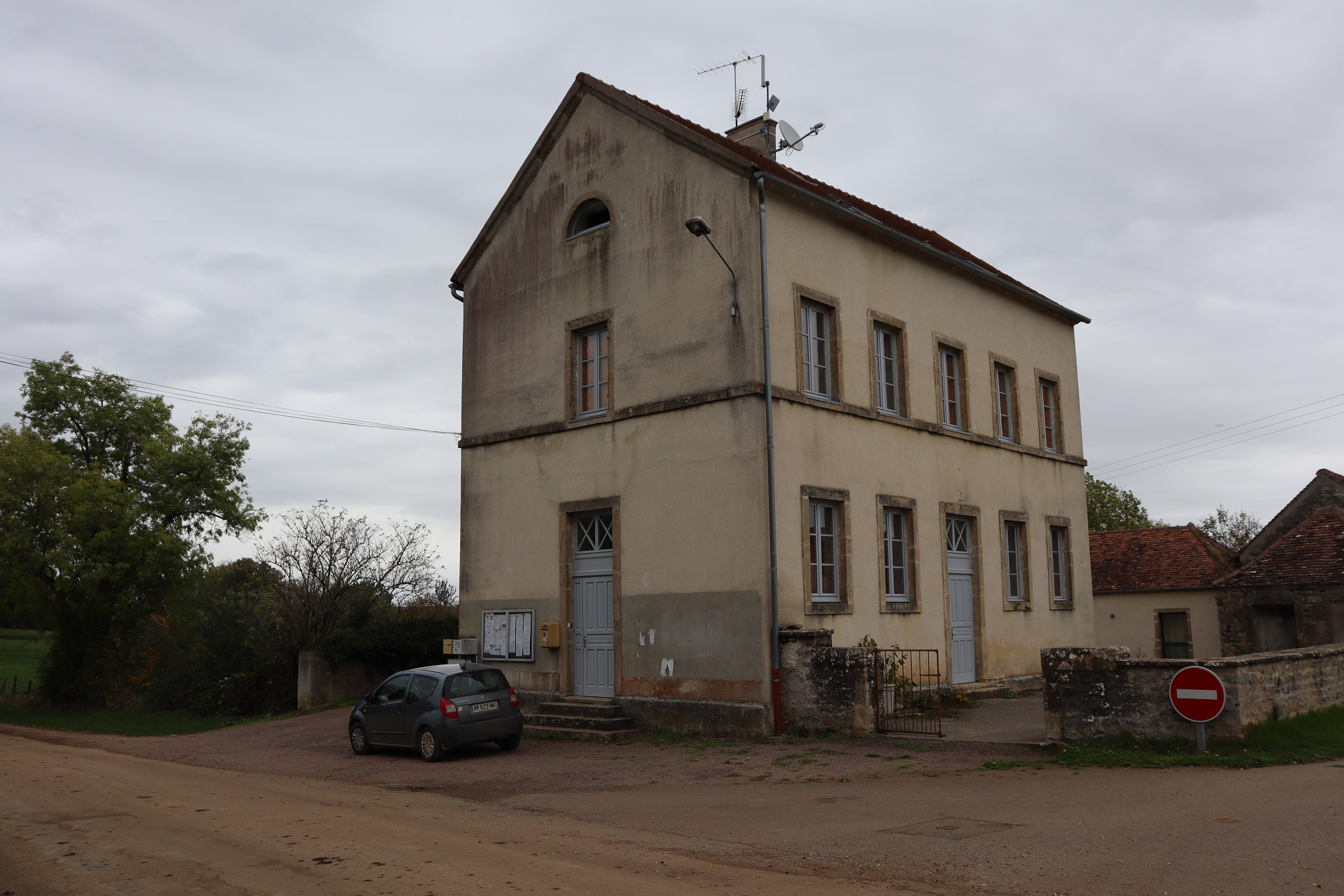
- Brianny Town hall
- Location of Brianny
- Location within France Location within Bourgogne-Franche-Comté
- Coordinates: 47°24′44″N 4°22′27″E
- Country: France
- Region: Bourgogne-Franche-Comté
- Department: Côte-d'Or
- Arrondissement: Montbard
- Canton: Semur-en-Auxois

Government
  - Mayor (2020–2026): Alain Delaye
- Area^{1}: 7.53 km^{2} (2.91 sq mi)
- Elevation: 324 m (1,063 ft)
- Highest elevation: 342 m (1,122 ft)
- Lowest elevation: 299 m (981 ft)
- Population (2023): 102
  - Density: 13.5/km^{2} (35.1/sq mi)
- Time zone: UTC+01:00 (CET)
  - Summer (DST): UTC+02:00 (CEST)
- INSEE/Postal code: 21108 /21390
- ^{1} French Land Register data, which excludes lakes, ponds, glaciers > 1 km^{2} (0.386 sq mi or 247 acres) and river estuaries.

Brianny (French pronunciation: [bʁijani]) is a commune in the Côte-d'Or department in eastern France.

== Population ==
Historical population
Year	Pop.	±% p.a.
1968	103	—
1975	89	−2.07%
1982	96	+1.09%
1990	98	+0.26%
1999	100	+0.22%
2007	117	+1.98%
2012	101	−2.90%
2017	121	+3.68%
2023	102	−2.81%
Source: INSEE

== See also ==
- Communes of the Côte-d'Or department
