= Vic-de-Chassenay =

- Commune
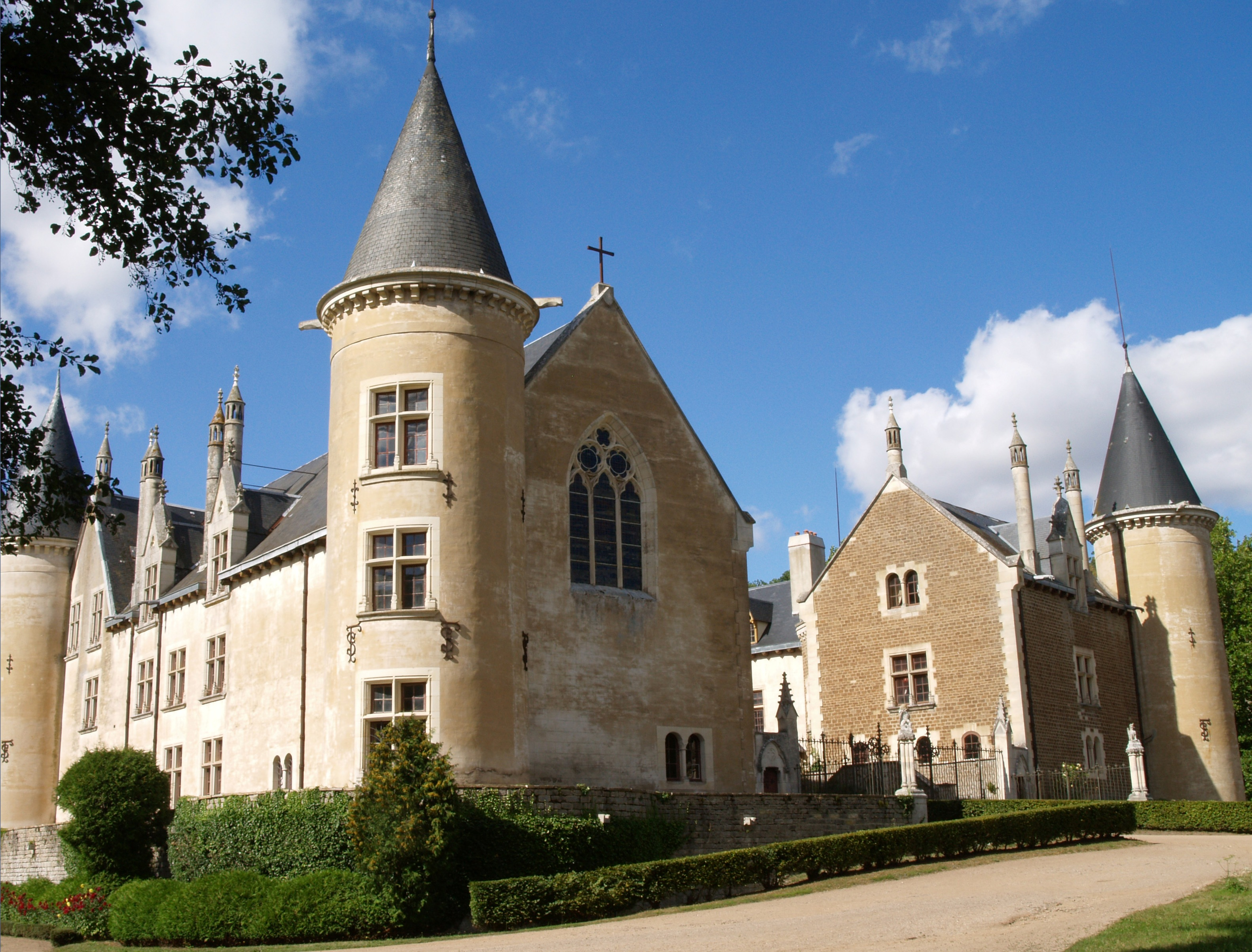
- Chateau of Bourbilly
- Location of Vic-de-Chassenay
- Location within France Location within Bourgogne-Franche-Comté
- Coordinates: 47°28′26″N 4°15′59″E
- Country: France
- Region: Bourgogne-Franche-Comté
- Department: Côte-d'Or
- Arrondissement: Montbard
- Canton: Semur-en-Auxois

Government
  - Mayor (2020–2026): François-Marie Deffontaines
- Area^{1}: 26.47 km^{2} (10.22 sq mi)
- Highest elevation: 372 m (1,220 ft)
- Lowest elevation: 279 m (915 ft)
- Population (2023): 207
  - Density: 7.82/km^{2} (20.3/sq mi)
- Time zone: UTC+01:00 (CET)
  - Summer (DST): UTC+02:00 (CEST)
- INSEE/Postal code: 21676 /21140
- ^{1} French Land Register data, which excludes lakes, ponds, glaciers > 1 km^{2} (0.386 sq mi or 247 acres) and river estuaries.

Vic-de-Chassenay (French pronunciation: [vik də ʃasnɛ]) is a commune in Côte-d'Or, a department in eastern France.

== Population ==
Historical population
Year	Pop.	±% p.a.
1968	279	—
1975	245	−1.84%
1982	213	−1.98%
1990	264	+2.72%
1999	254	−0.43%
2007	237	−0.86%
2012	228	−0.77%
2017	222	−0.53%
2023	207	−1.16%
Source: INSEE

== See also ==
- Communes of the Côte-d'Or department
