= Fontangy =

- Commune
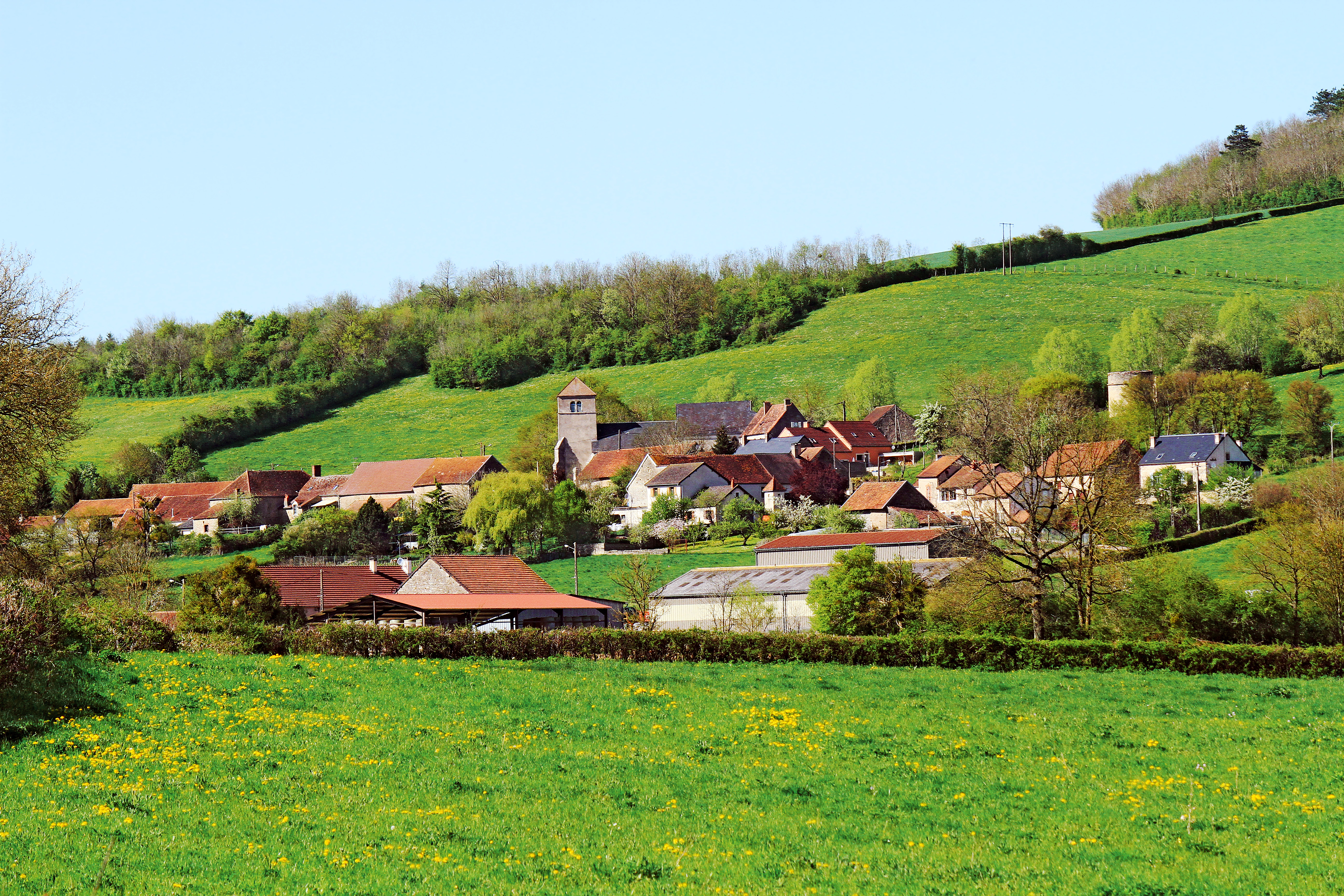
- Fontangy on the side of Mont Ligot
- Location of Fontangy
- Location within France Location within Bourgogne-Franche-Comté
- Coordinates: 47°20′49″N 4°21′25″E
- Country: France
- Region: Bourgogne-Franche-Comté
- Department: Côte-d'Or
- Arrondissement: Montbard
- Canton: Semur-en-Auxois

Government
  - Mayor (2020–2026): Corinne Delage
- Area^{1}: 17.61 km^{2} (6.80 sq mi)
- Elevation: 450 m (1,480 ft)
- Highest elevation: 561 m (1,841 ft)
- Lowest elevation: 345 m (1,132 ft)
- Population (2023): 162
  - Density: 9.20/km^{2} (23.8/sq mi)
- Time zone: UTC+01:00 (CET)
  - Summer (DST): UTC+02:00 (CEST)
- INSEE/Postal code: 21280 /21390
- ^{1} French Land Register data, which excludes lakes, ponds, glaciers > 1 km^{2} (0.386 sq mi or 247 acres) and river estuaries.

Fontangy (French pronunciation: [fɔ̃tɑ̃ʒi]) is a commune in the Côte-d'Or department in eastern France.

== Population ==
Historical population
Year	Pop.	±% p.a.
1968	204	—
1975	181	−1.69%
1982	166	−1.23%
1990	153	−1.01%
1999	147	−0.44%
2007	151	+0.34%
2012	147	−0.54%
2017	139	−1.11%
2023	162	+2.58%
Source: INSEE

== See also ==
- Communes of the Côte-d'Or department
