= Clamerey =

- Commune
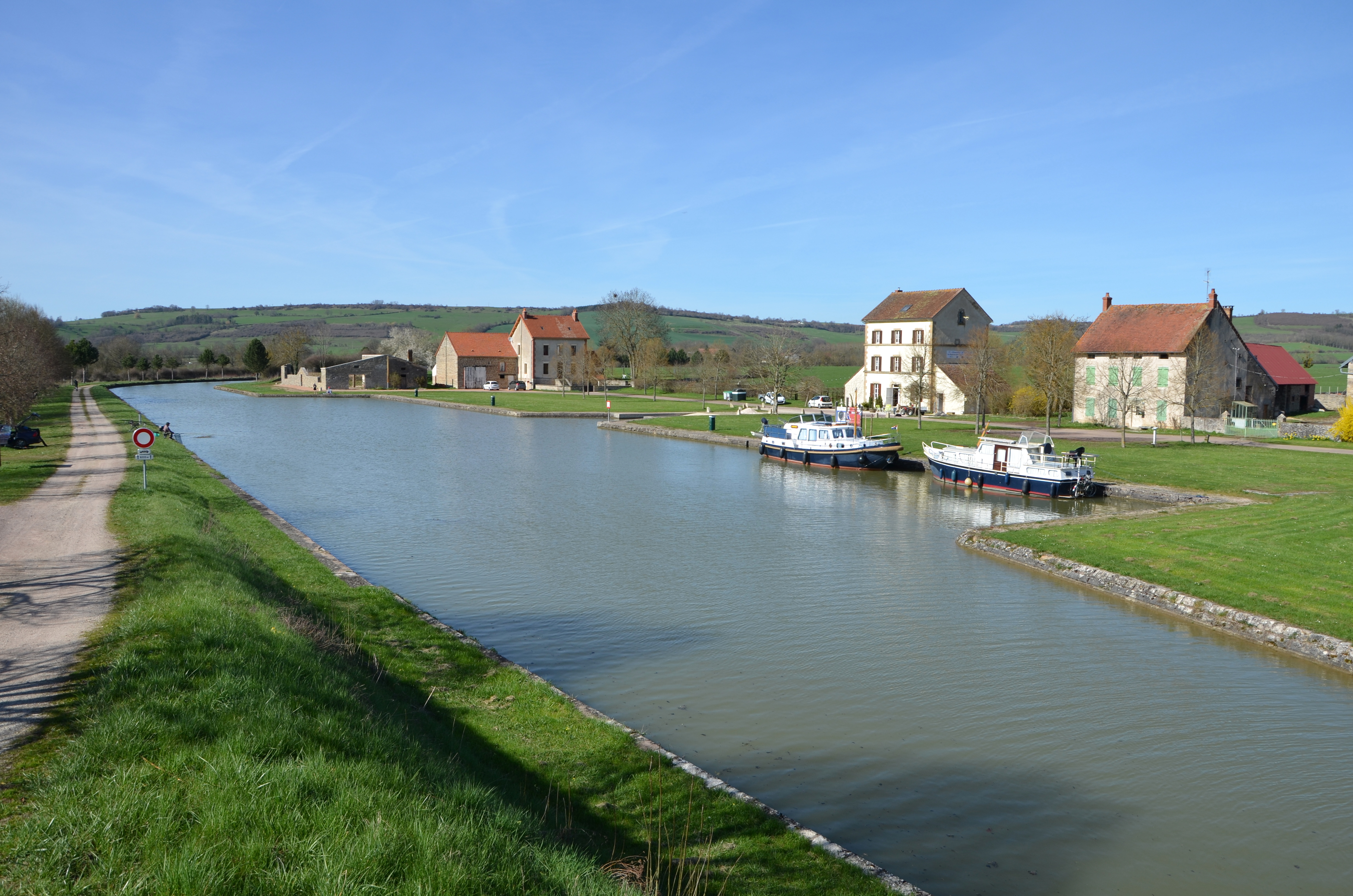
- Pont-Royal on the canal of Bourgogne in Clamerey

- Coat of arms
- Location of Clamerey
- Location within France Location within Bourgogne-Franche-Comté
- Coordinates: 47°23′14″N 4°25′39″E
- Country: France
- Region: Bourgogne-Franche-Comté
- Department: Côte-d'Or
- Arrondissement: Montbard
- Canton: Semur-en-Auxois

Government
  - Mayor (2020–2026): Eric Demouron
- Area^{1}: 12.08 km^{2} (4.66 sq mi)
- Elevation: 332 m (1,089 ft)
- Highest elevation: 491 m (1,611 ft)
- Lowest elevation: 314 m (1,030 ft)
- Population (2023): 187
  - Density: 15.5/km^{2} (40.1/sq mi)
- Time zone: UTC+01:00 (CET)
  - Summer (DST): UTC+02:00 (CEST)
- INSEE/Postal code: 21177 /21390
- ^{1} French Land Register data, which excludes lakes, ponds, glaciers > 1 km^{2} (0.386 sq mi or 247 acres) and river estuaries.

Clamerey (French pronunciation: [klamʁɛ]) is a commune in the Côte-d'Or department, in the Bourgogne-Franche-Comté region.

== Population ==
Historical population
Year	Pop.	±% p.a.
1968	258	—
1975	220	−2.25%
1982	217	−0.20%
1990	193	−1.45%
1999	191	−0.12%
2007	173	−1.23%
2012	181	+0.91%
2017	184	+0.33%
2023	187	+0.27%
Source: INSEE

== See also ==
- Communes of the Côte-d'Or department
