= Forléans =

- Commune
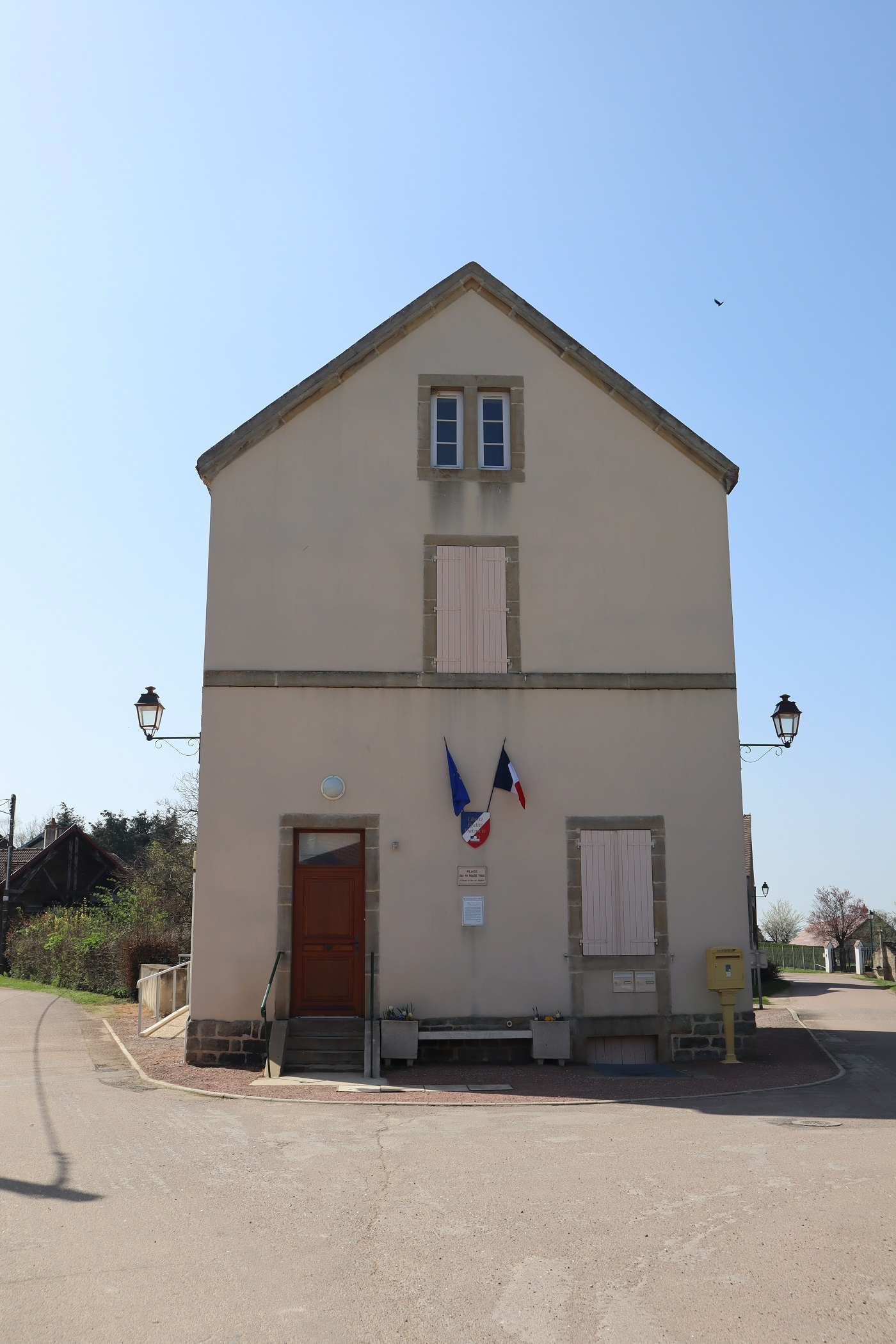
- Town hall

- Coat of arms
- Location of Forléans
- Location within France Location within Bourgogne-Franche-Comté
- Coordinates: 47°29′03″N 4°12′21″E
- Country: France
- Region: Bourgogne-Franche-Comté
- Department: Côte-d'Or
- Arrondissement: Montbard
- Canton: Semur-en-Auxois

Government
  - Mayor (2020–2026): Norbert Perrot
- Area^{1}: 7.1 km^{2} (2.7 sq mi)
- Elevation: 265 m (869 ft)
- Highest elevation: 348 m (1,142 ft)
- Lowest elevation: 287 m (942 ft)
- Population (2023): 112
  - Density: 16/km^{2} (41/sq mi)
- Time zone: UTC+01:00 (CET)
  - Summer (DST): UTC+02:00 (CEST)
- INSEE/Postal code: 21282 /21460
- ^{1} French Land Register data, which excludes lakes, ponds, glaciers > 1 km^{2} (0.386 sq mi or 247 acres) and river estuaries.

Forléans (French pronunciation: [fɔʁleɑ̃]) is a commune in the Côte-d'Or department in eastern France.

== Population ==
Historical population
Year	Pop.	±% p.a.
1968	103	—
1975	93	−1.45%
1982	95	+0.30%
1990	77	−2.59%
1999	79	+0.29%
2007	84	+0.77%
2012	107	+4.96%
2017	103	−0.76%
2023	112	+1.41%
Source: INSEE

== See also ==
- Communes of the Côte-d'Or department
