= Torcy-et-Pouligny =

- Commune
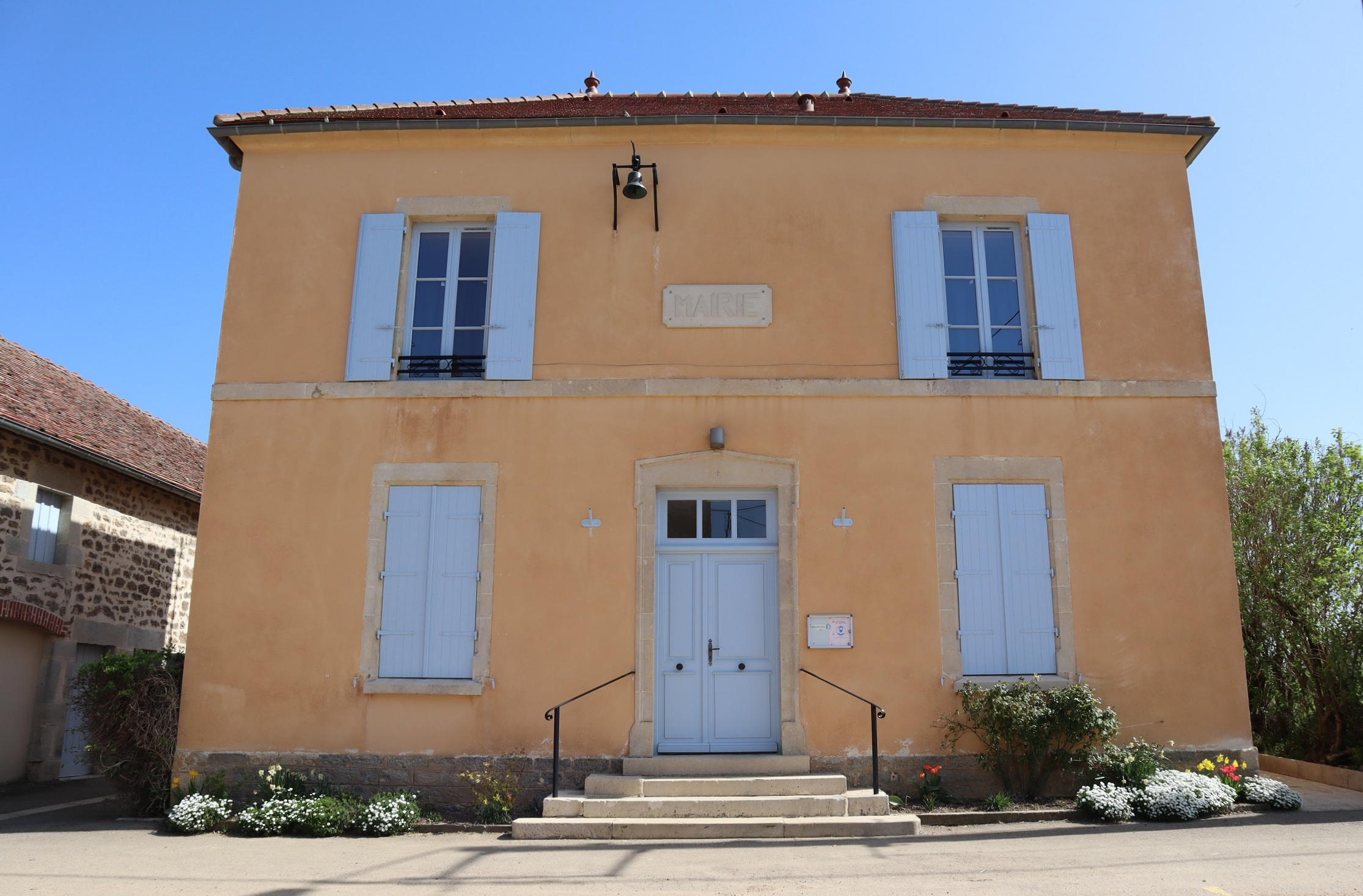
- Town hall
- Location of Torcy-et-Pouligny
- Location within France Location within Bourgogne-Franche-Comté
- Coordinates: 47°29′38″N 4°13′23″E
- Country: France
- Region: Bourgogne-Franche-Comté
- Department: Côte-d'Or
- Arrondissement: Montbard
- Canton: Semur-en-Auxois

Government
  - Mayor (2020–2026): Alain Gueneau
- Area^{1}: 10.31 km^{2} (3.98 sq mi)
- Elevation: 293 m (961 ft)
- Highest elevation: 338 m (1,109 ft)
- Lowest elevation: 240 m (790 ft)
- Population (2023): 202
  - Density: 19.6/km^{2} (50.7/sq mi)
- Time zone: UTC+01:00 (CET)
  - Summer (DST): UTC+02:00 (CEST)
- INSEE/Postal code: 21640 /21460
- ^{1} French Land Register data, which excludes lakes, ponds, glaciers > 1 km^{2} (0.386 sq mi or 247 acres) and river estuaries.

Torcy-et-Pouligny (French pronunciation: [tɔʁsi e puliɲi]) is a commune in the Côte-d'Or department in eastern France.

== Population ==
Historical population
Year	Pop.	±% p.a.
1968	193	—
1975	161	−2.56%
1982	161	+0.00%
1990	190	+2.09%
1999	175	−0.91%
2007	155	−1.51%
2012	187	+3.83%
2017	204	+1.76%
2023	202	−0.16%
Source: INSEE

== See also ==
- Communes of the Côte-d'Or department
