= Villars-et-Villenotte =

- Commune
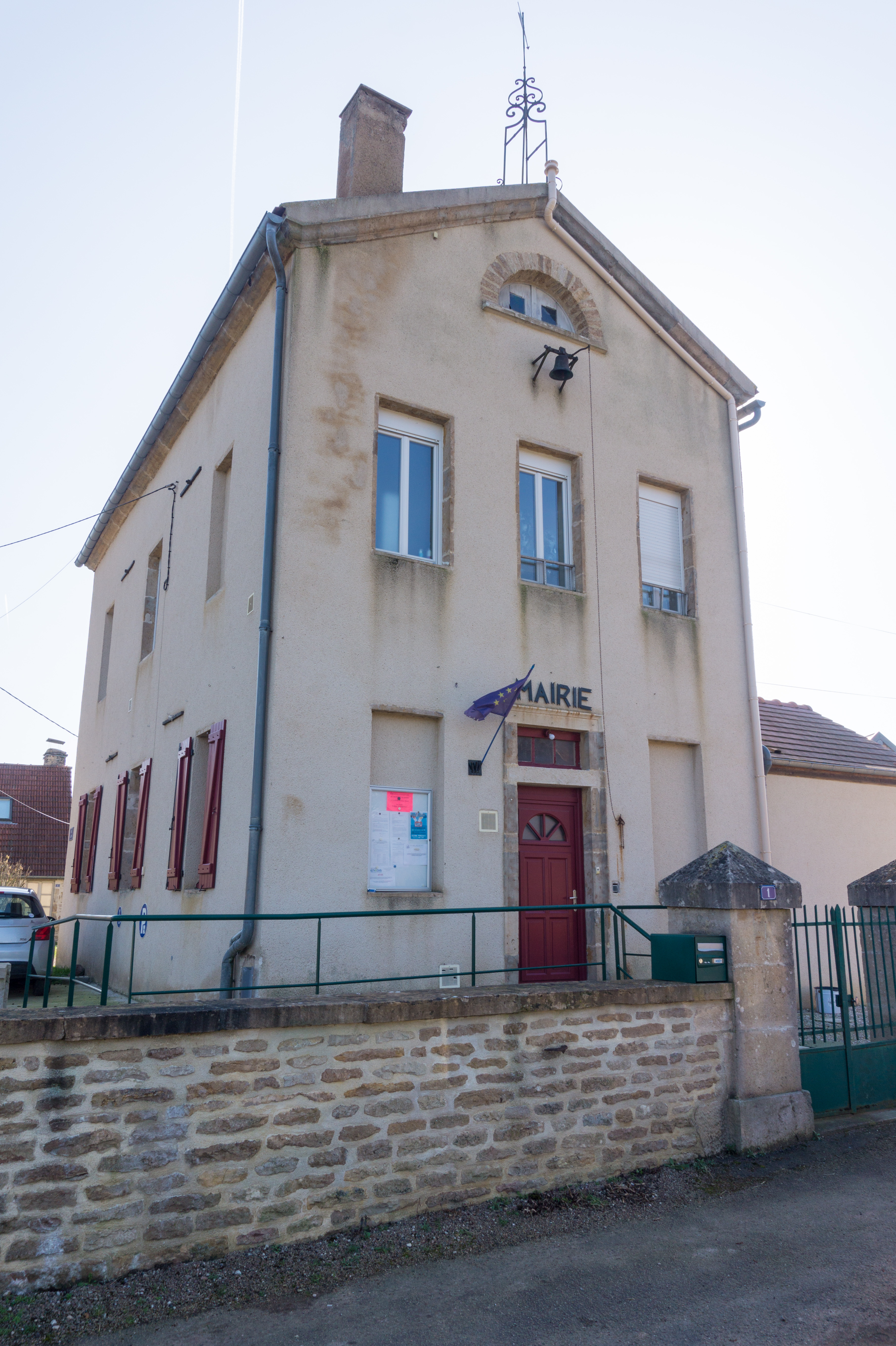
- Town hall
- Location of Villars-et-Villenotte
- Location within France Location within Bourgogne-Franche-Comté
- Coordinates: 47°30′46″N 4°22′42″E
- Country: France
- Region: Bourgogne-Franche-Comté
- Department: Côte-d'Or
- Arrondissement: Montbard
- Canton: Semur-en-Auxois

Government
  - Mayor (2020–2026): Philippe Gueniffey
- Area^{1}: 7.52 km^{2} (2.90 sq mi)
- Elevation: 330 m (1,080 ft)
- Highest elevation: 418 m (1,371 ft)
- Lowest elevation: 282 m (925 ft)
- Population (2023): 166
  - Density: 22.1/km^{2} (57.2/sq mi)
- Time zone: UTC+01:00 (CET)
  - Summer (DST): UTC+02:00 (CEST)
- INSEE/Postal code: 21689 /21140
- ^{1} French Land Register data, which excludes lakes, ponds, glaciers > 1 km^{2} (0.386 sq mi or 247 acres) and river estuaries.

Villars-et-Villenotte (French pronunciation: [vilaʁ e vilnɔt]) is a commune in the Côte-d'Or department in eastern France.

== Population ==
Historical population
Year	Pop.	±% p.a.
1968	73	—
1975	78	+0.95%
1982	89	+1.90%
1990	137	+5.54%
1999	161	+1.81%
2007	150	−0.88%
2012	162	+1.55%
2017	174	+1.44%
2023	166	−0.78%
Source: INSEE

== See also ==
- Communes of the Côte-d'Or department
