= Juilly, Côte-d'Or =

Juilly
- Commune
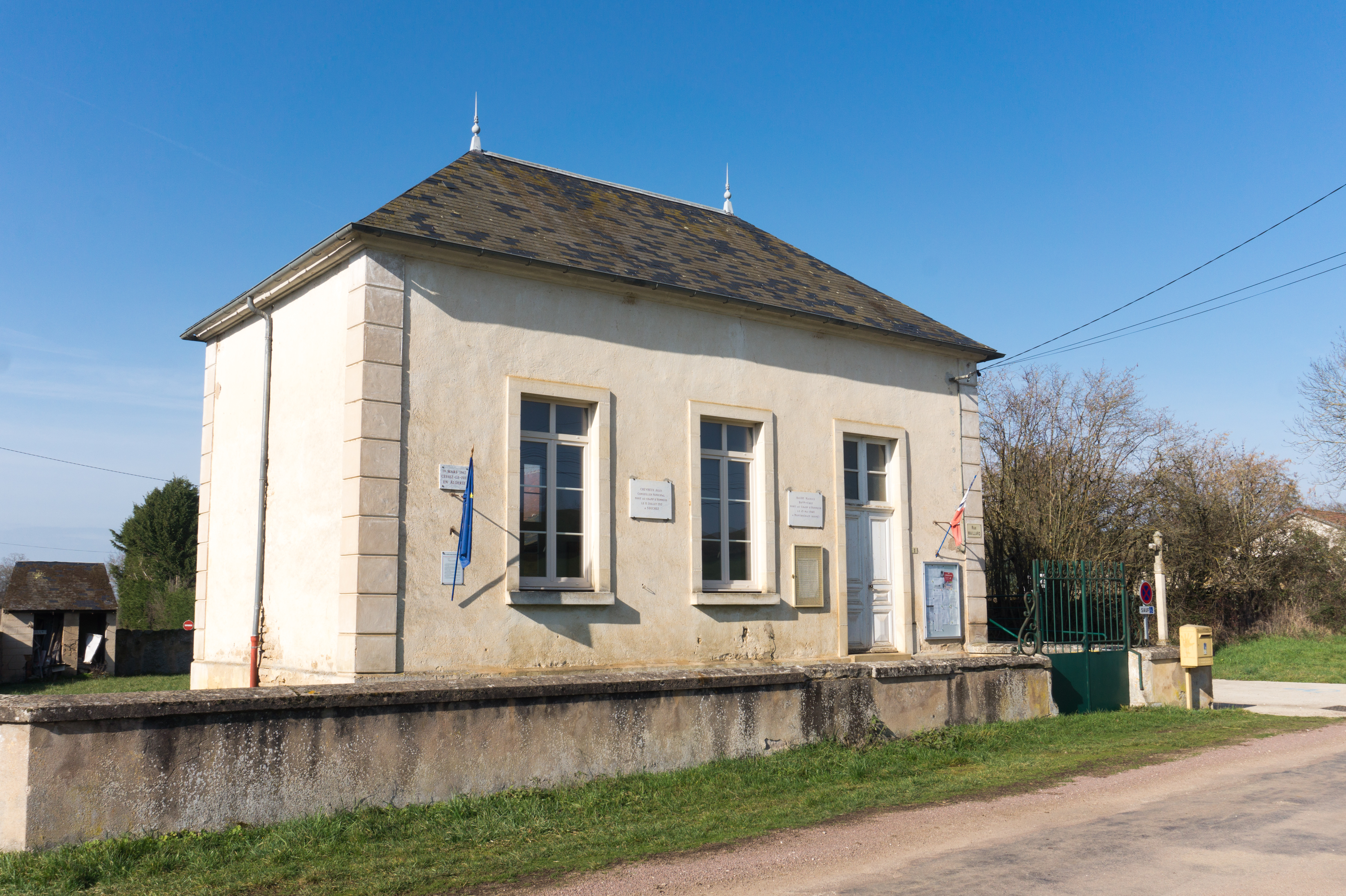
- Juilly Town hall
- Location of Juilly
- Location within France Location within Bourgogne-Franche-Comté
- Coordinates: 47°29′27″N 4°24′04″E
- Country: France
- Region: Bourgogne-Franche-Comté
- Department: Côte-d'Or
- Arrondissement: Montbard
- Canton: Semur-en-Auxois

Government
  - Mayor (2020–2026): Béatrice Bauby
- Area^{1}: 4.46 km^{2} (1.72 sq mi)
- Elevation: 298 m (978 ft)
- Highest elevation: 428 m (1,404 ft)
- Lowest elevation: 293 m (961 ft)
- Population (2023): 41
  - Density: 9.2/km^{2} (24/sq mi)
- Time zone: UTC+01:00 (CET)
  - Summer (DST): UTC+02:00 (CEST)
- INSEE/Postal code: 21329 /21140
- ^{1} French Land Register data, which excludes lakes, ponds, glaciers > 1 km^{2} (0.386 sq mi or 247 acres) and river estuaries.

Juilly (French pronunciation: [ʒɥiji]) is a commune in the Côte-d'Or department in eastern France.

== Population ==
Historical population
Year	Pop.	±% p.a.
1968	52	—
1975	46	−1.74%
1982	49	+0.91%
1990	49	+0.00%
1999	56	+1.49%
2007	51	−1.16%
2012	37	−6.22%
2017	47	+4.90%
2023	41	−2.25%
Source: INSEE

== See also ==
- Communes of the Côte-d'Or department
