= Quincerot =

Quincerot is the name of two communes in France:

- Quincerot, Côte-d'Or
- Quincerot, Yonne
