= Planay =

Planay may refer to the following places in France:

- Planay, Côte-d'Or, a commune in the Côte-d'Or department
- Planay, Savoie, a commune in the Savoie department
