= Saint-Germain-lès-Senailly =

- Commune
- Location of Saint-Germain-lès-Senailly
- Location within France Location within Bourgogne-Franche-Comté
- Coordinates: 47°35′56″N 4°16′26″E
- Country: France
- Region: Bourgogne-Franche-Comté
- Department: Côte-d'Or
- Arrondissement: Montbard
- Canton: Montbard

Government
  - Mayor (2020–2026): Annick Clergeot
- Area^{1}: 4.98 km^{2} (1.92 sq mi)
- Elevation: 389 m (1,276 ft)
- Highest elevation: 387 m (1,270 ft)
- Lowest elevation: 208 m (682 ft)
- Population (2023): 111
  - Density: 22.3/km^{2} (57.7/sq mi)
- Time zone: UTC+01:00 (CET)
  - Summer (DST): UTC+02:00 (CEST)
- INSEE/Postal code: 21550 /21500
- ^{1} French Land Register data, which excludes lakes, ponds, glaciers > 1 km^{2} (0.386 sq mi or 247 acres) and river estuaries.

Saint-Germain-lès-Senailly (French pronunciation: [sɛ̃ ʒɛʁmɛ̃ lɛ sənaji], literally Saint-Germain near Senailly) is a commune in the Côte-d'Or department in eastern France.

== Population ==
Historical population
Year	Pop.	±% p.a.
1968	78	—
1975	84	+1.06%
1982	100	+2.52%
1990	100	+0.00%
1999	107	+0.75%
2007	95	−1.48%
2012	99	+0.83%
2017	125	+4.77%
2023	111	−1.96%
Source: INSEE

== See also ==
- Communes of the Côte-d'Or department
