= Charencey =

Charencey may refer to:

- Charencey, Côte-d'Or, a commune in the Côte-d'Or department, France
- Charencey, Orne, a commune in the Orne department, France
