= Nesle-et-Massoult =

- Commune
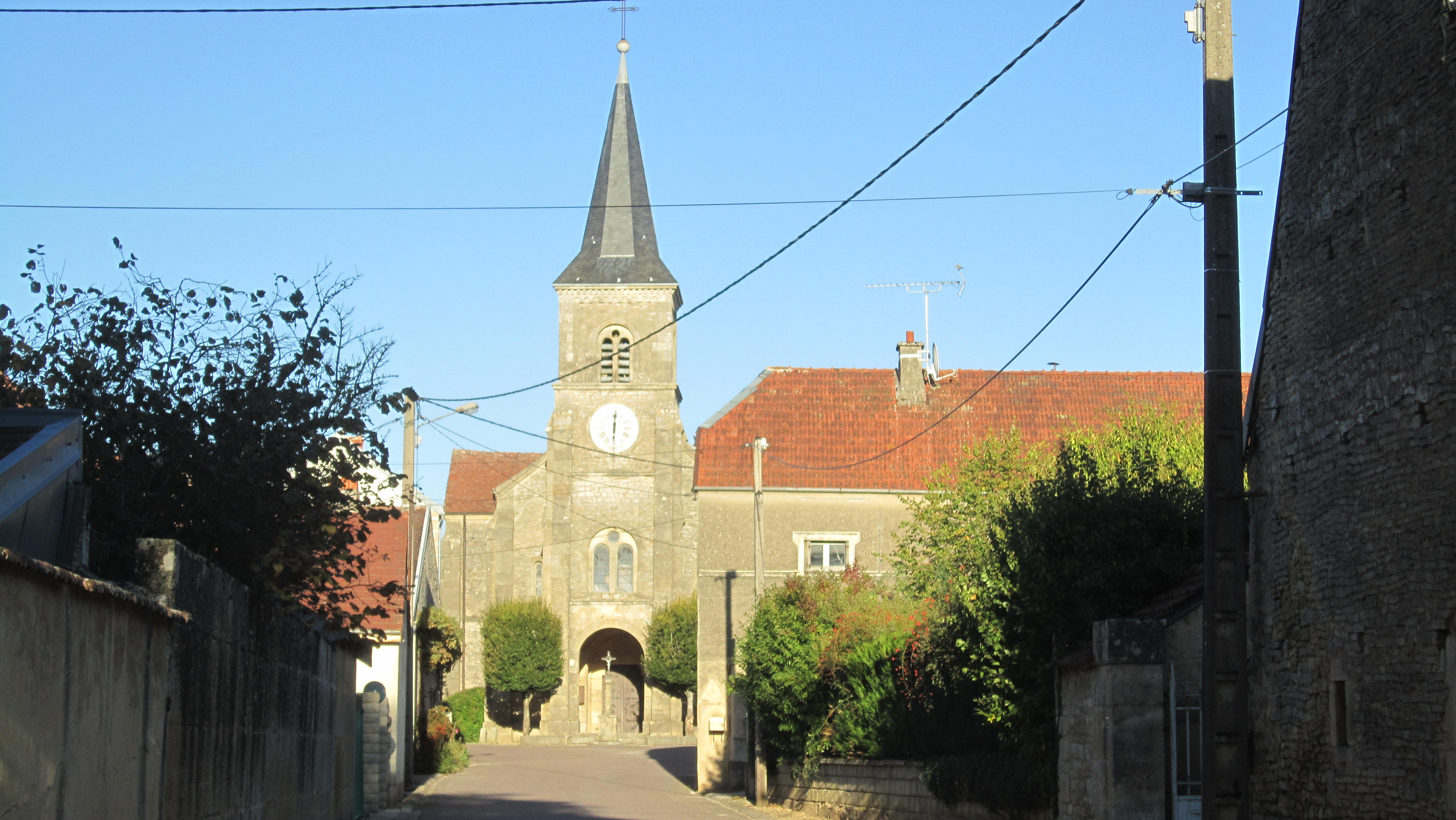
- Nesle
- Location of Nesle-et-Massoult
- Location within France Location within Bourgogne-Franche-Comté
- Coordinates: 47°46′37″N 4°25′54″E
- Country: France
- Region: Bourgogne-Franche-Comté
- Department: Côte-d'Or
- Arrondissement: Montbard
- Canton: Montbard

Government
  - Mayor (2020–2026): Didier Baudry
- Area^{1}: 23.38 km^{2} (9.03 sq mi)
- Elevation: 298 m (978 ft)
- Highest elevation: 317 m (1,040 ft)
- Lowest elevation: 238 m (781 ft)
- Population (2023): 78
  - Density: 3.3/km^{2} (8.6/sq mi)
- Time zone: UTC+01:00 (CET)
  - Summer (DST): UTC+02:00 (CEST)
- INSEE/Postal code: 21451 /21330
- ^{1} French Land Register data, which excludes lakes, ponds, glaciers > 1 km^{2} (0.386 sq mi or 247 acres) and river estuaries.

Nesle-et-Massoult (French pronunciation: [nɛl e masu]) is a commune in the Côte-d'Or department in eastern France.

== Population ==
Historical population
Year	Pop.	±% p.a.
1968	122	—
1975	99	−2.94%
1982	80	−3.00%
1990	92	+1.76%
1999	101	+1.04%
2007	87	−1.85%
2012	78	−2.16%
2017	75	−0.78%
2023	78	+0.66%
Source: INSEE

== See also ==
- Communes of the Côte-d'Or department
