= Étais =

- Commune
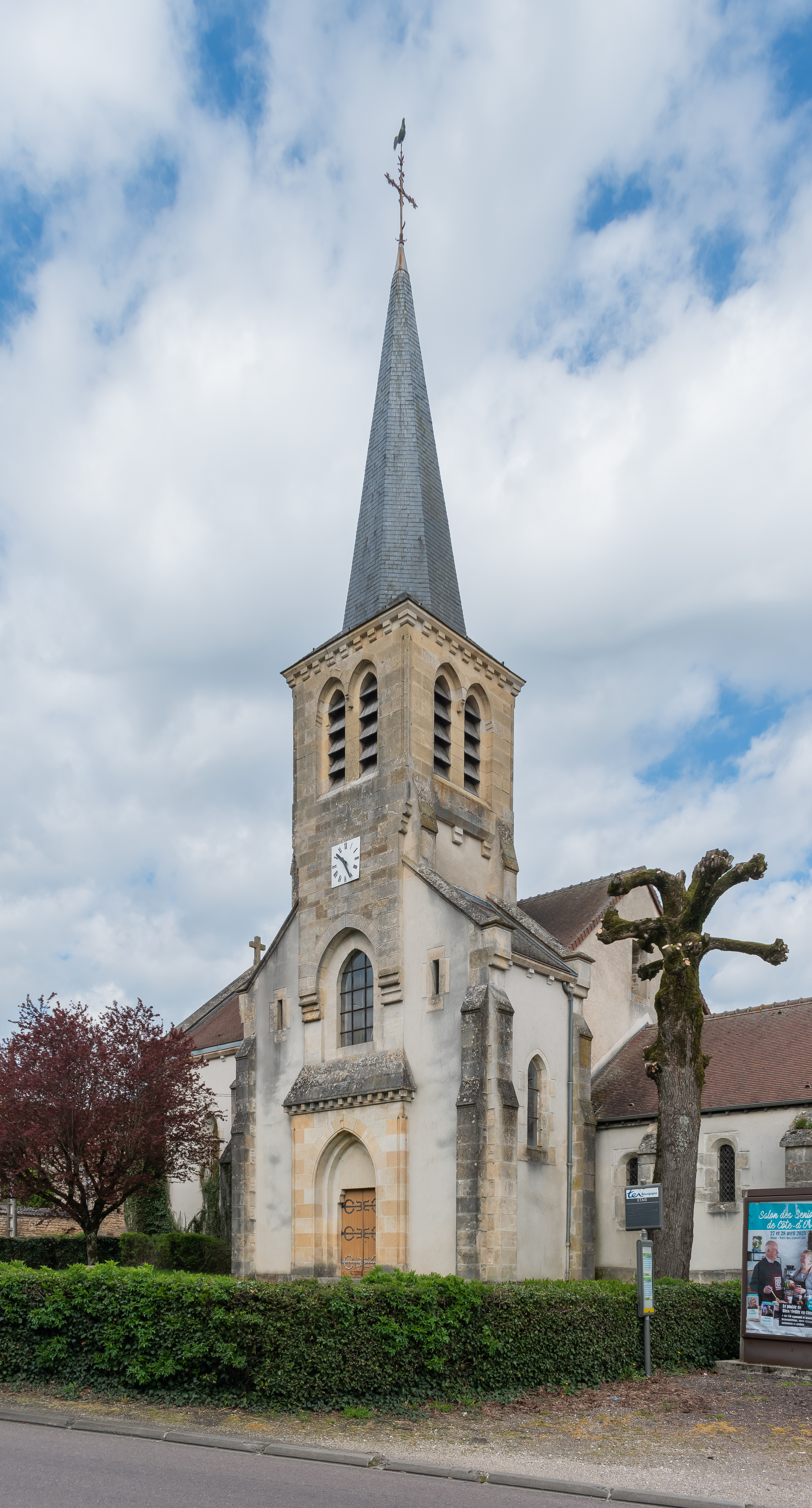
- The church Saint-Barthélemy of Étais.

- Coat of arms
- Location of Étais
- Location within France Location within Bourgogne-Franche-Comté
- Coordinates: 47°42′31″N 4°26′15″E
- Country: France
- Region: Bourgogne-Franche-Comté
- Department: Côte-d'Or
- Arrondissement: Montbard
- Canton: Montbard

Government
  - Mayor (2020–2026): Claude Bouttefroy
- Area^{1}: 14.04 km^{2} (5.42 sq mi)
- Elevation: 355 m (1,165 ft)
- Highest elevation: 362 m (1,188 ft)
- Lowest elevation: 303 m (994 ft)
- Population (2023): 75
  - Density: 5.3/km^{2} (14/sq mi)
- Time zone: UTC+01:00 (CET)
  - Summer (DST): UTC+02:00 (CEST)
- INSEE/Postal code: 21252 /21500
- ^{1} French Land Register data, which excludes lakes, ponds, glaciers > 1 km^{2} (0.386 sq mi or 247 acres) and river estuaries.

Étais (French pronunciation: [etɛ]) is a commune in the Côte-d'Or department in eastern France.

== Population ==
Historical population
Year	Pop.	±% p.a.
1968	132	—
1975	140	+0.84%
1982	122	−1.95%
1990	96	−2.95%
1999	87	−1.09%
2007	88	+0.14%
2012	90	+0.45%
2017	85	−1.14%
2023	75	−2.06%
Source: INSEE

== See also ==
- Communes of the Côte-d'Or department
