= Champ-d'Oiseau =

- Commune
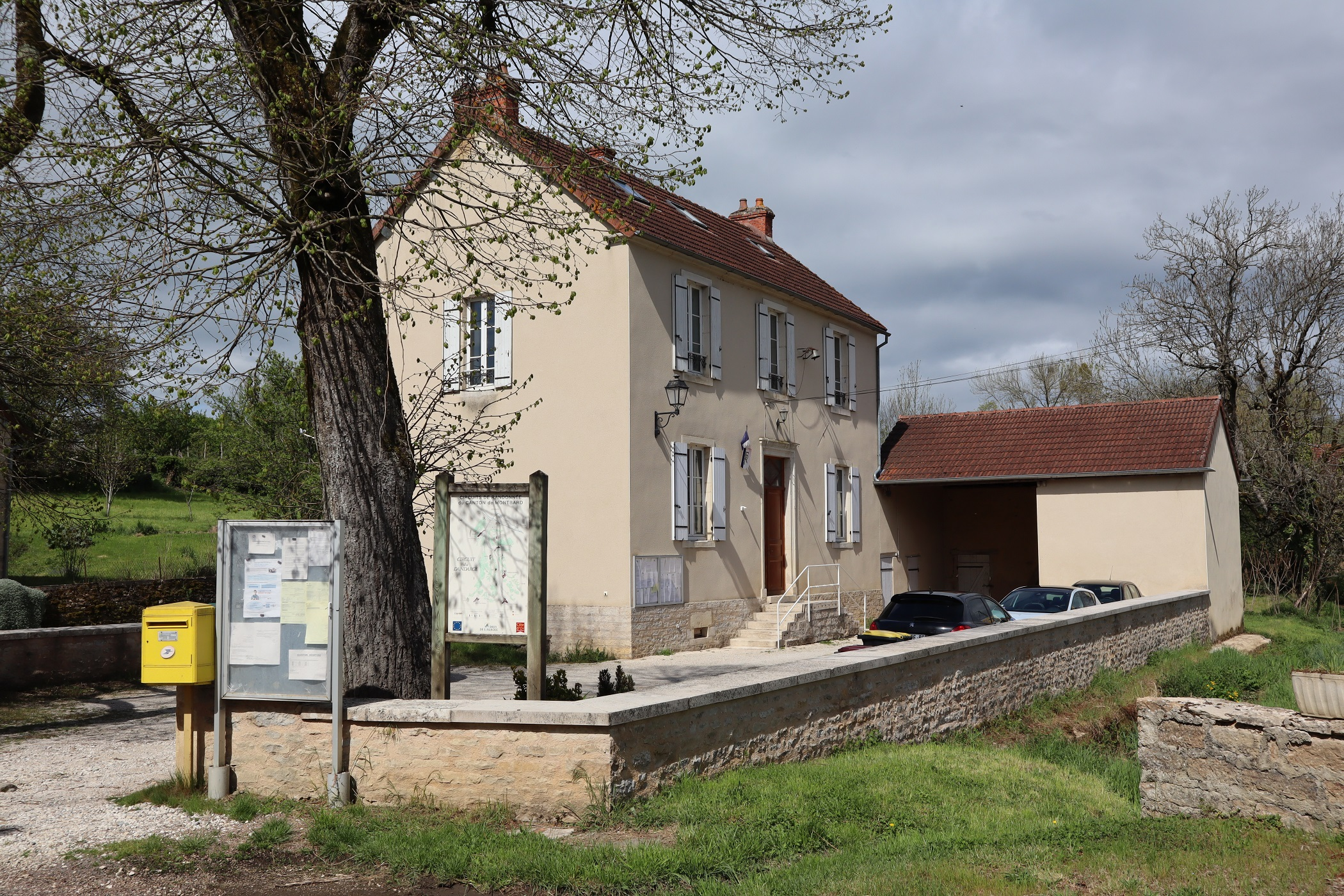
- Champ-d'Oiseau Town hall
- Location of Champ-d'Oiseau
- Location within France Location within Bourgogne-Franche-Comté
- Coordinates: 47°33′16″N 4°20′50″E
- Country: France
- Region: Bourgogne-Franche-Comté
- Department: Côte-d'Or
- Arrondissement: Montbard
- Canton: Montbard

Government
  - Mayor (2020–2026): Noël Magnon
- Area^{1}: 4.83 km^{2} (1.86 sq mi)
- Elevation: 290 m (950 ft)
- Highest elevation: 395 m (1,296 ft)
- Lowest elevation: 283 m (928 ft)
- Population (2023): 113
  - Density: 23.4/km^{2} (60.6/sq mi)
- Time zone: UTC+01:00 (CET)
  - Summer (DST): UTC+02:00 (CEST)
- INSEE/Postal code: 21137 /21500
- ^{1} French Land Register data, which excludes lakes, ponds, glaciers > 1 km^{2} (0.386 sq mi or 247 acres) and river estuaries.

Champ-d'Oiseau (French pronunciation: [ʃɑ̃ dwazo]) is a commune in the Côte-d'Or department in eastern France.

== Population ==
Historical population
Year	Pop.	±% p.a.
1968	82	—
1975	67	−2.84%
1982	67	+0.00%
1990	76	+1.59%
1999	86	+1.38%
2007	75	−1.70%
2012	79	+1.04%
2017	90	+2.64%
2023	113	+3.87%
Source: INSEE

== See also ==
- Communes of the Côte-d'Or department
