= Crépand =

- Commune
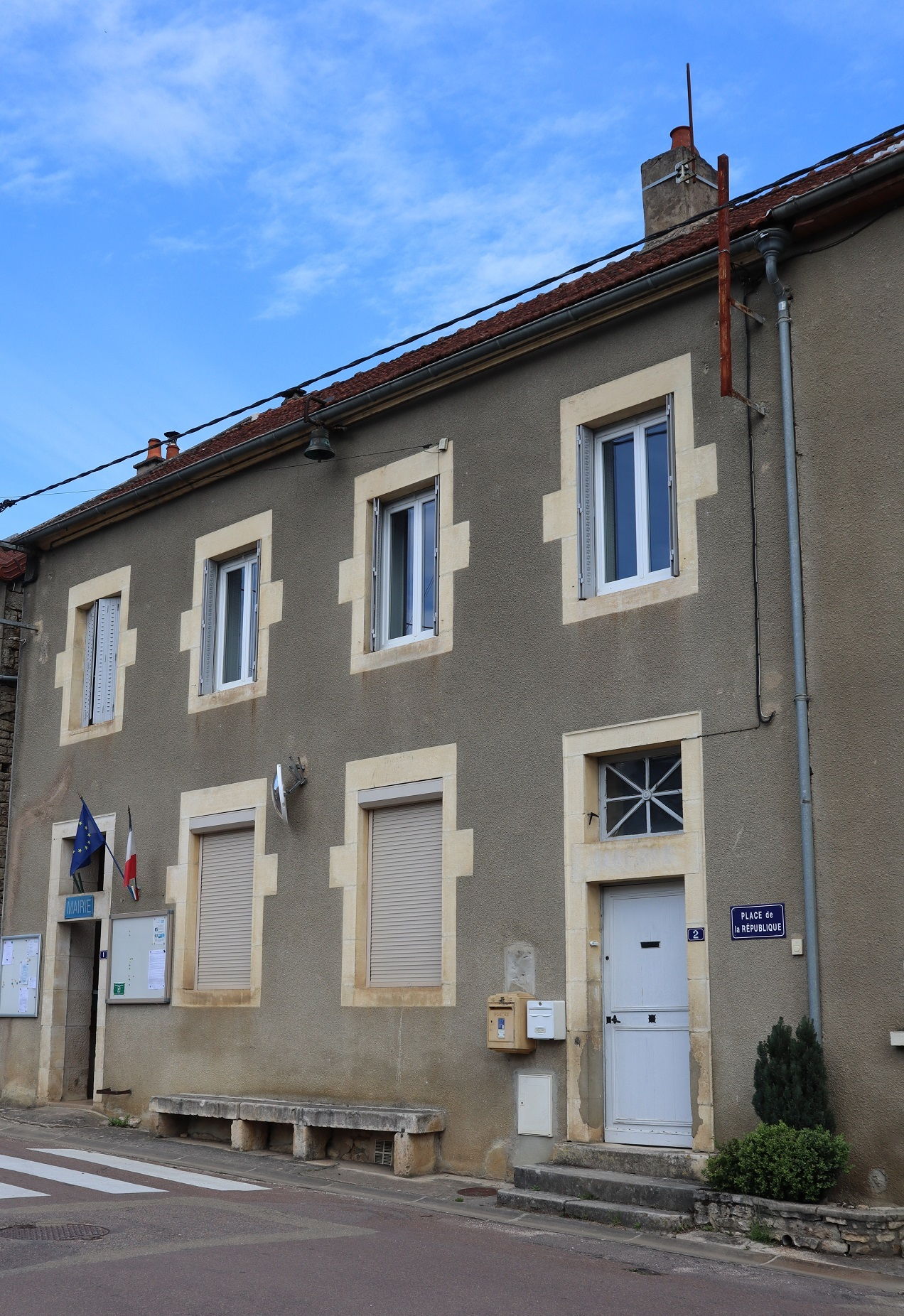
- Town hall
- Location of Crépand
- Location within France Location within Bourgogne-Franche-Comté
- Coordinates: 47°36′44″N 4°18′38″E
- Country: France
- Region: Bourgogne-Franche-Comté
- Department: Côte-d'Or
- Arrondissement: Montbard
- Canton: Montbard

Government
  - Mayor (2020–2026): Medhi Arton
- Area^{1}: 5.79 km^{2} (2.24 sq mi)
- Elevation: 239 m (784 ft)
- Highest elevation: 381 m (1,250 ft)
- Lowest elevation: 207 m (679 ft)
- Population (2023): 315
  - Density: 54.4/km^{2} (141/sq mi)
- Time zone: UTC+01:00 (CET)
  - Summer (DST): UTC+02:00 (CEST)
- INSEE/Postal code: 21212 /21500
- ^{1} French Land Register data, which excludes lakes, ponds, glaciers > 1 km^{2} (0.386 sq mi or 247 acres) and river estuaries.

Crépand (French pronunciation: [kʁepɑ̃]) is a commune in the Côte-d'Or department in eastern France.

== Population ==
Historical population
Year	Pop.	±% p.a.
1968	292	—
1975	343	+2.33%
1982	328	−0.64%
1990	348	+0.74%
1999	340	−0.26%
2007	343	+0.11%
2012	333	−0.59%
2017	324	−0.55%
2023	315	−0.47%
Source: INSEE

== See also ==
- Communes of the Côte-d'Or department
