= Verdonnet =

- Commune
- Coat of arms
- Location of Verdonnet
- Location within France Location within Bourgogne-Franche-Comté
- Coordinates: 47°44′14″N 4°19′51″E
- Country: France
- Region: Bourgogne-Franche-Comté
- Department: Côte-d'Or
- Arrondissement: Montbard
- Canton: Montbard

Government
  - Mayor (2020–2026): Dominique Cernesson
- Area^{1}: 18.04 km^{2} (6.97 sq mi)
- Elevation: 307 m (1,007 ft)
- Highest elevation: 323 m (1,060 ft)
- Lowest elevation: 221 m (725 ft)
- Population (2023): 62
  - Density: 3.4/km^{2} (8.9/sq mi)
- Time zone: UTC+01:00 (CET)
  - Summer (DST): UTC+02:00 (CEST)
- INSEE/Postal code: 21664 /21330
- ^{1} French Land Register data, which excludes lakes, ponds, glaciers > 1 km^{2} (0.386 sq mi or 247 acres) and river estuaries.

Verdonnet (French pronunciation: [vɛʁdɔnɛ]) is a commune in the Côte-d'Or department in eastern France.

== Population ==
Historical population
| Year | Pop. | ±% p.a. |
|---|---|---|
| 1968 | 147 | — |
| 1975 | 112 | −3.81% |
| 1982 | 120 | +0.99% |
| 1990 | 91 | −3.40% |
| 1999 | 84 | −0.89% |
| 2007 | 86 | +0.29% |
| 2012 | 89 | +0.69% |
| 2017 | 83 | −1.39% |
| 2023 | 62 | −4.75% |
Source: INSEE

== See also ==
- Communes of the Côte-d'Or department
