= Thenissey =

- Commune
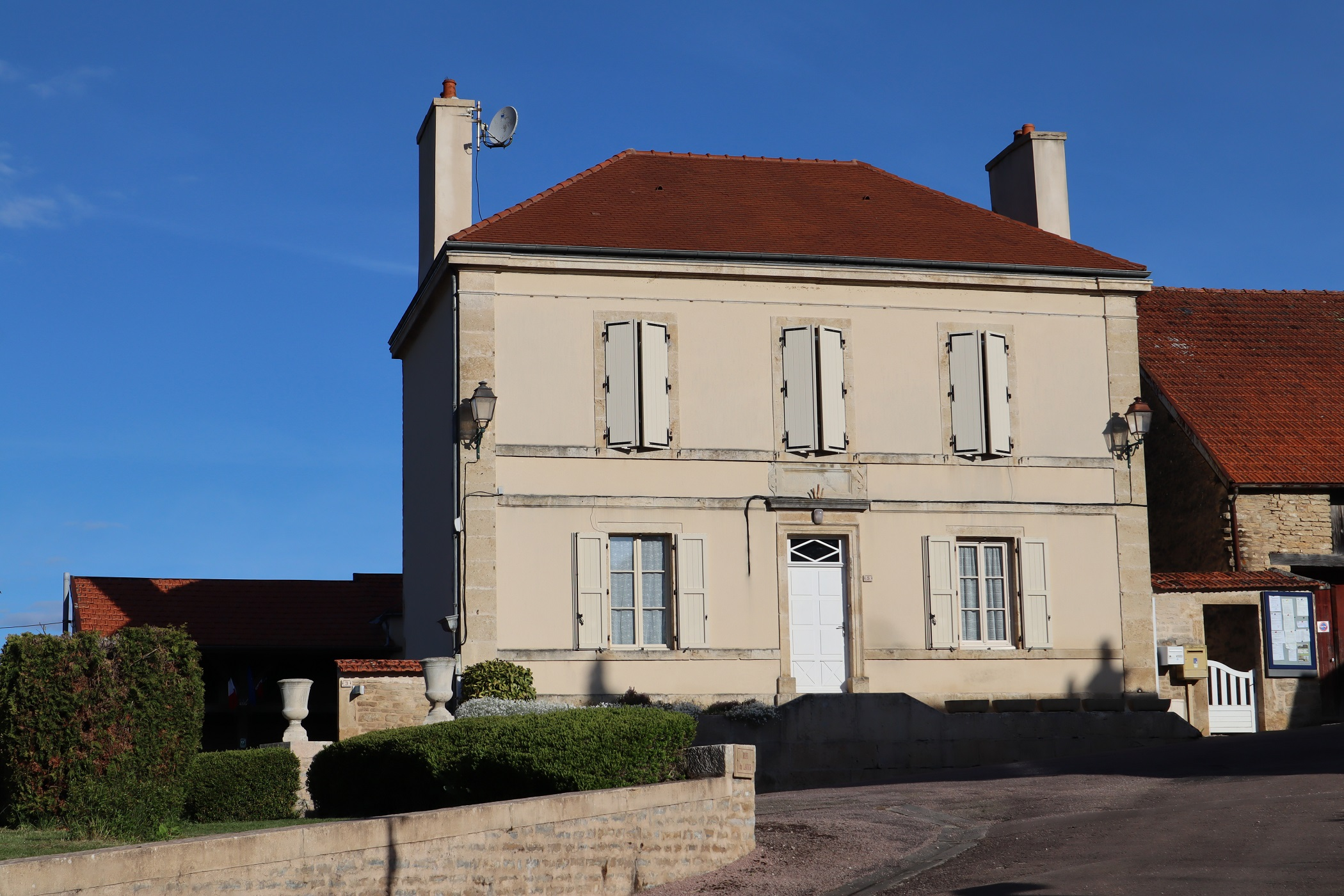
- Town hall
- Location of Thenissey
- Location within France Location within Bourgogne-Franche-Comté
- Coordinates: 47°29′48″N 4°37′28″E
- Country: France
- Region: Bourgogne-Franche-Comté
- Department: Côte-d'Or
- Arrondissement: Montbard
- Canton: Montbard

Government
  - Mayor (2025–2026): Claude Roussin
- Area^{1}: 10.25 km^{2} (3.96 sq mi)
- Elevation: 309 m (1,014 ft)
- Highest elevation: 468 m (1,535 ft)
- Lowest elevation: 283 m (928 ft)
- Population (2023): 93
  - Density: 9.1/km^{2} (23/sq mi)
- Time zone: UTC+01:00 (CET)
  - Summer (DST): UTC+02:00 (CEST)
- INSEE/Postal code: 21627 /21150
- ^{1} French Land Register data, which excludes lakes, ponds, glaciers > 1 km^{2} (0.386 sq mi or 247 acres) and river estuaries.

Thenissey (French pronunciation: [tənisɛ]) is a commune in the Côte-d'Or department in eastern France.

== Population ==
Historical population
Year	Pop.	±% p.a.
1968	176	—
1975	172	−0.33%
1982	157	−1.30%
1990	131	−2.24%
1999	115	−1.44%
2007	119	+0.43%
2012	118	−0.17%
2017	105	−2.31%
2023	93	−2.00%
Source: INSEE

== See also ==
- Communes of the Côte-d'Or department
