= Fain-lès-Moutiers =

- Commune
- Location of Fain-lès-Moutiers
- Location within France Location within Bourgogne-Franche-Comté
- Coordinates: 47°35′03″N 4°12′46″E
- Country: France
- Region: Bourgogne-Franche-Comté
- Department: Côte-d'Or
- Arrondissement: Montbard
- Canton: Montbard
- Intercommunality: Montbardois

Government
  - Mayor (2020–2026): Jérôme Petident
- Area^{1}: 9.75 km^{2} (3.76 sq mi)
- Elevation: 342 m (1,122 ft)
- Highest elevation: 356 m (1,168 ft)
- Lowest elevation: 220 m (720 ft)
- Population (2023): 152
  - Density: 15.6/km^{2} (40.4/sq mi)
- Time zone: UTC+01:00 (CET)
  - Summer (DST): UTC+02:00 (CEST)
- INSEE/Postal code: 21260 /21500
- ^{1} French Land Register data, which excludes lakes, ponds, glaciers > 1 km^{2} (0.386 sq mi or 247 acres) and river estuaries.

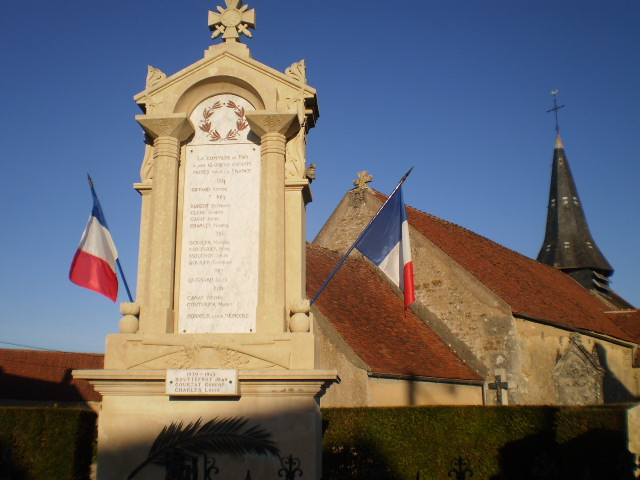
Fain-lès-Moutiers

Fain-lès-Moutiers (French pronunciation: [fɛ̃ lɛ mutje], literally Fain near Moutiers) is a commune in the Côte-d'Or department in Bourgogne-Franche-Comté in eastern France.

== Geography ==
Fain-lès-Moutiers is located 80 km (50 mi) from Dijon and 15 km (9.3 mi) from Montbard.

== Population ==
Historical population
Year	Pop.	±% p.a.
1968	212	—
1975	179	−2.39%
1982	159	−1.68%
1990	141	−1.49%
1999	147	+0.46%
2007	208	+4.43%
2012	153	−5.96%
2017	155	+0.26%
2023	152	−0.33%
Source: INSEE

== Personalities ==
It was the birthplace of Catherine Labouré (1806–1876), Catholic saint.

== See also ==
- Communes of the Côte-d'Or department
