= Viserny =

- Commune
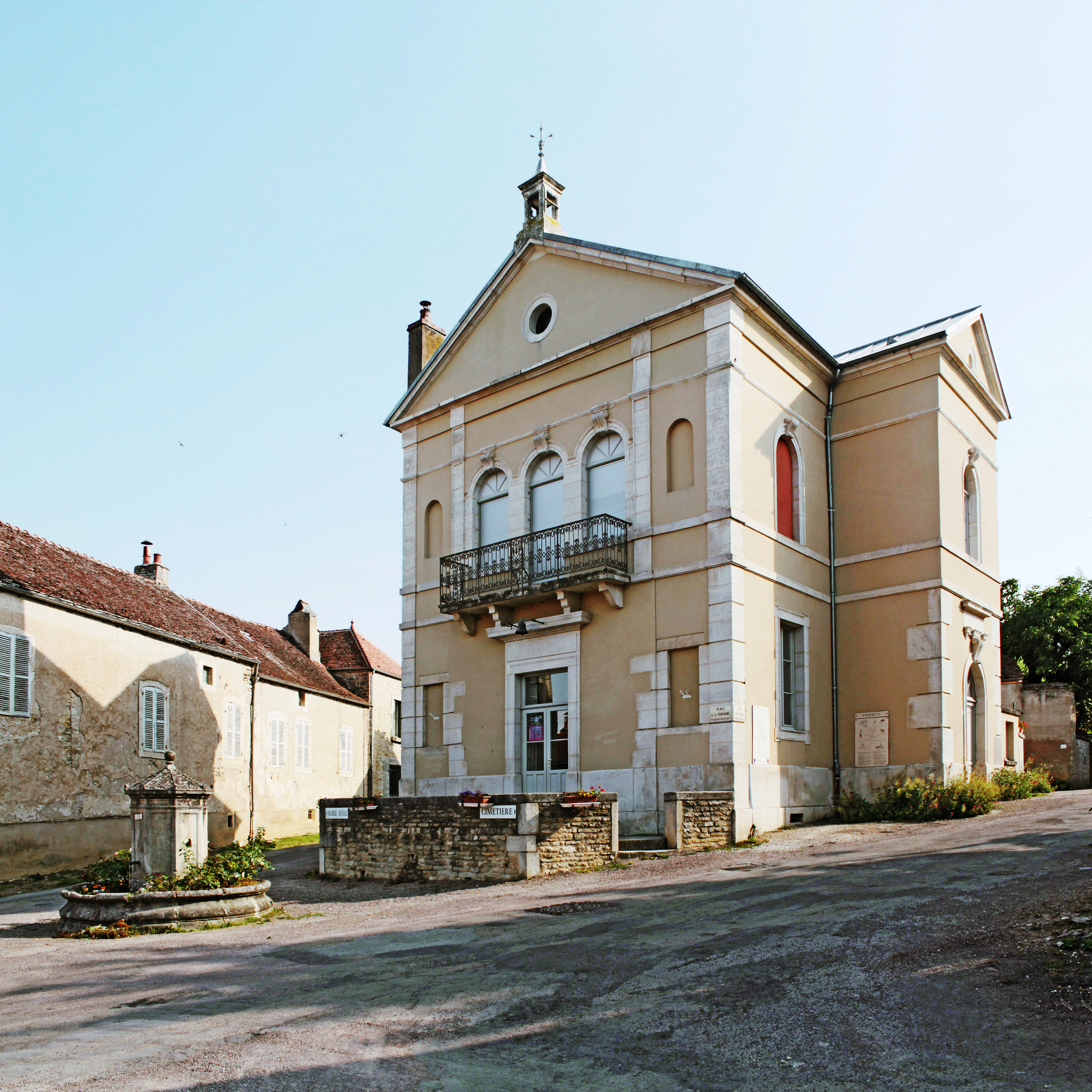
- The town hall in Viserny
- Location of Viserny
- Location within France Location within Bourgogne-Franche-Comté
- Coordinates: 47°33′37″N 4°16′51″E
- Country: France
- Region: Bourgogne-Franche-Comté
- Department: Côte-d'Or
- Arrondissement: Montbard
- Canton: Montbard

Government
  - Mayor (2020–2026): Colette Remond
- Area^{1}: 6.75 km^{2} (2.61 sq mi)
- Elevation: 210 m (690 ft)
- Highest elevation: 437 m (1,434 ft)
- Lowest elevation: 213 m (699 ft)
- Population (2023): 182
  - Density: 27.0/km^{2} (69.8/sq mi)
- Time zone: UTC+01:00 (CET)
  - Summer (DST): UTC+02:00 (CEST)
- INSEE/Postal code: 21709 /21500
- ^{1} French Land Register data, which excludes lakes, ponds, glaciers > 1 km^{2} (0.386 sq mi or 247 acres) and river estuaries.

Viserny (French pronunciation: [vizɛʁni]) is a commune in the Côte-d'Or department in eastern France.

== Population ==
Historical population
| Year | Pop. | ±% p.a. |
|---|---|---|
| 1968 | 176 | — |
| 1975 | 175 | −0.08% |
| 1982 | 170 | −0.41% |
| 1990 | 191 | +1.47% |
| 1999 | 167 | −1.48% |
| 2007 | 199 | +2.22% |
| 2012 | 183 | −1.66% |
| 2017 | 178 | −0.55% |
| 2023 | 182 | +0.37% |
Source: INSEE

== See also ==
- Communes of the Côte-d'Or department
