= Boux-sous-Salmaise =

- Commune
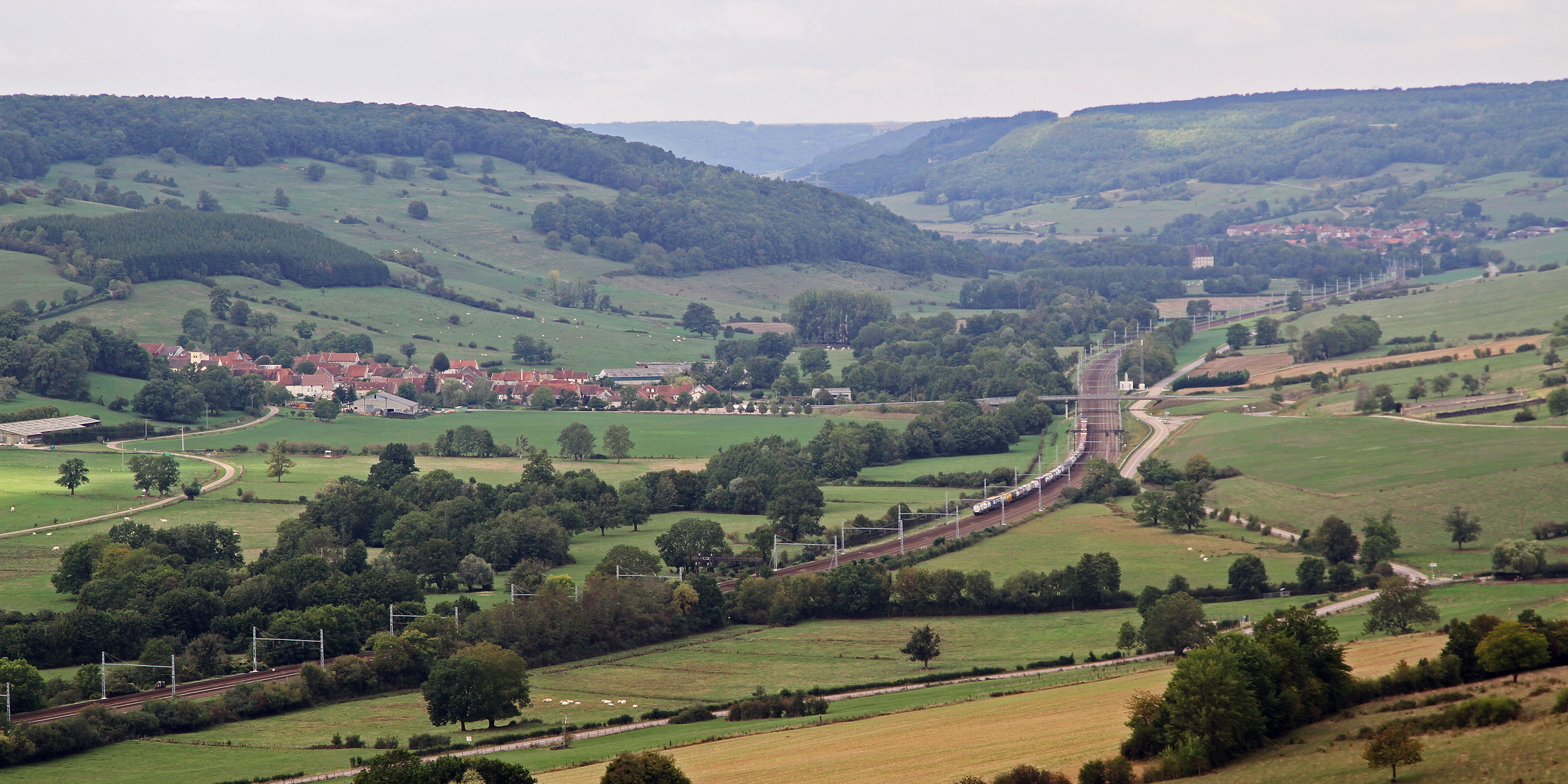
- A general view of Boux-sous-Salmaise
- Location of Boux-sous-Salmaise
- Location within France Location within Bourgogne-Franche-Comté
- Coordinates: 47°28′28″N 4°38′21″E
- Country: France
- Region: Bourgogne-Franche-Comté
- Department: Côte-d'Or
- Arrondissement: Montbard
- Canton: Montbard

Government
  - Mayor (2020–2026): Jean-Pierre Millerand
- Area^{1}: 14.64 km^{2} (5.65 sq mi)
- Elevation: 314 m (1,030 ft)
- Highest elevation: 498 m (1,634 ft)
- Lowest elevation: 296 m (971 ft)
- Population (2023): 124
  - Density: 8.47/km^{2} (21.9/sq mi)
- Time zone: UTC+01:00 (CET)
  - Summer (DST): UTC+02:00 (CEST)
- INSEE/Postal code: 21098 /21690
- ^{1} French Land Register data, which excludes lakes, ponds, glaciers > 1 km^{2} (0.386 sq mi or 247 acres) and river estuaries.

Boux-sous-Salmaise (French pronunciation: [bu su salmɛz]) is a commune in the Côte-d'Or department in eastern France.

== Population ==
Historical population
Year	Pop.	±% p.a.
1968	247	—
1975	207	−2.49%
1982	170	−2.77%
1990	170	+0.00%
1999	149	−1.45%
2007	142	−0.60%
2012	135	−1.01%
2017	125	−1.53%
2023	124	−0.13%
Source: INSEE

== See also ==
- Communes of the Côte-d'Or department
