= Fresnes, Côte-d'Or =

Fresnes
- Commune
- Location of Fresnes
- Location within France Location within Bourgogne-Franche-Comté
- Coordinates: 47°36′31″N 4°26′24″E
- Country: France
- Region: Bourgogne-Franche-Comté
- Department: Côte-d'Or
- Arrondissement: Montbard
- Canton: Montbard

Government
  - Mayor (2020–2026): Mireille Letienne
- Area^{1}: 13.07 km^{2} (5.05 sq mi)
- Elevation: 300 m (980 ft)
- Highest elevation: 393 m (1,289 ft)
- Lowest elevation: 220 m (720 ft)
- Population (2023): 153
  - Density: 11.7/km^{2} (30.3/sq mi)
- Time zone: UTC+01:00 (CET)
  - Summer (DST): UTC+02:00 (CEST)
- INSEE/Postal code: 21287 /21500
- ^{1} French Land Register data, which excludes lakes, ponds, glaciers > 1 km^{2} (0.386 sq mi or 247 acres) and river estuaries.

Fresnes (French pronunciation: [fʁɛn]) is a commune in the Côte-d'Or department in eastern France.

== Population ==
Historical population
Year	Pop.	±% p.a.
1968	186	—
1975	168	−1.44%
1982	150	−1.61%
1990	169	+1.50%
1999	180	+0.70%
2007	176	−0.28%
2012	177	+0.11%
2017	168	−1.04%
2023	153	−1.55%
Source: INSEE

== See also ==
- Communes of the Côte-d'Or department
