= Benoisey =

- Commune
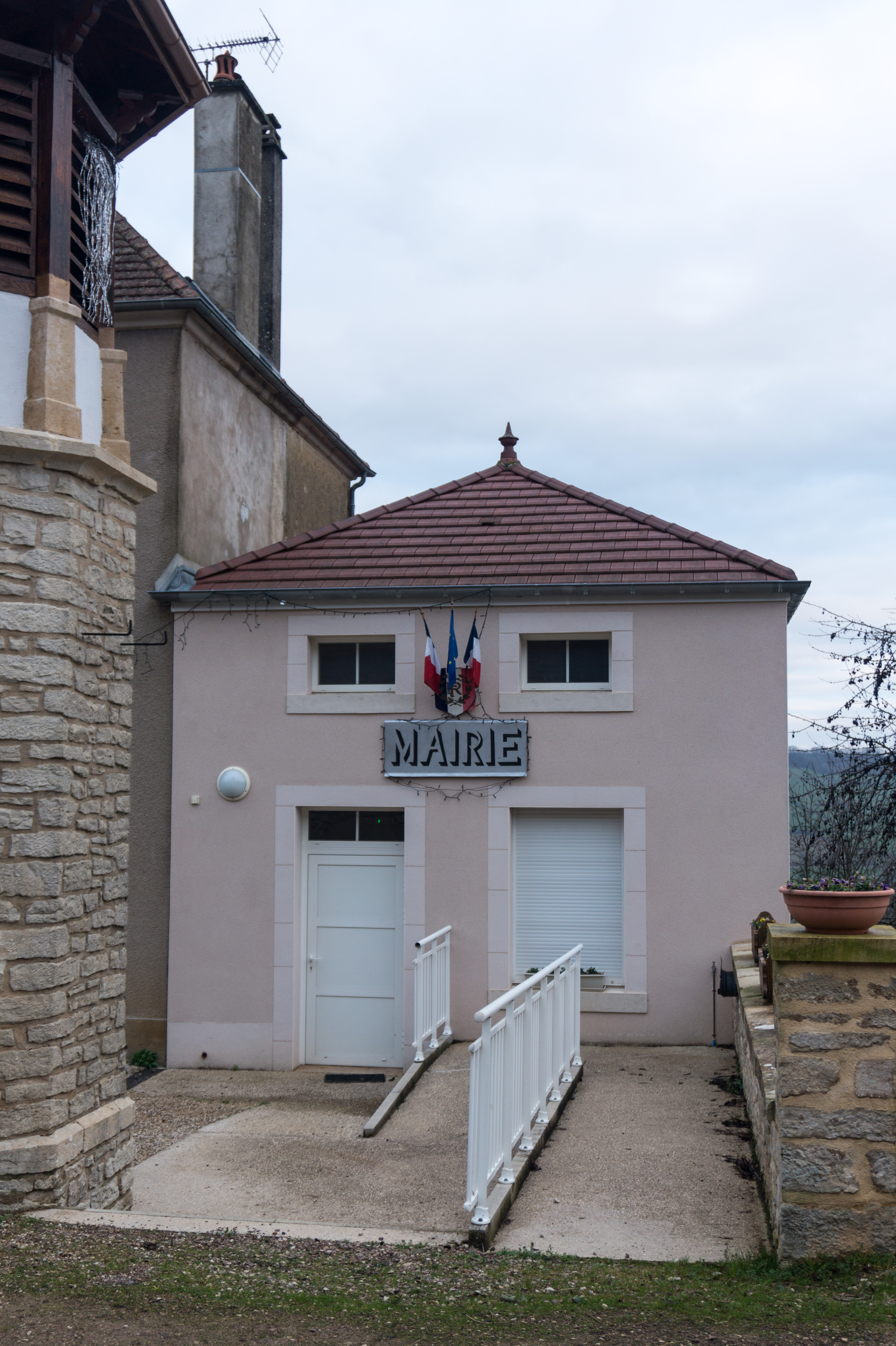
- Benoisey Town hall
- Location of Benoisey
- Location within France Location within Bourgogne-Franche-Comté
- Coordinates: 47°34′38″N 4°23′56″E
- Country: France
- Region: Bourgogne-Franche-Comté
- Department: Côte-d'Or
- Arrondissement: Montbard
- Canton: Montbard

Government
  - Mayor (2020–2026): François Bouhier
- Area^{1}: 5.8 km^{2} (2.2 sq mi)
- Elevation: 265 m (869 ft)
- Highest elevation: 378 m (1,240 ft)
- Lowest elevation: 219 m (719 ft)
- Population (2023): 95
  - Density: 16/km^{2} (42/sq mi)
- Time zone: UTC+01:00 (CET)
  - Summer (DST): UTC+02:00 (CEST)
- INSEE/Postal code: 21064 /21500
- ^{1} French Land Register data, which excludes lakes, ponds, glaciers > 1 km^{2} (0.386 sq mi or 247 acres) and river estuaries.

Benoisey (French pronunciation: [bənwazɛ]) is a commune in the Côte-d'Or department in eastern France.

== Population ==
Historical population
Year	Pop.	±% p.a.
1968	90	—
1975	76	−2.39%
1982	81	+0.91%
1990	88	+1.04%
1999	72	−2.21%
2007	73	+0.17%
2012	82	+2.35%
2017	109	+5.86%
2023	95	−2.27%
Source: INSEE

== See also ==
- Communes of the Côte-d'Or department
