= Gissey-sous-Flavigny =

- Commune
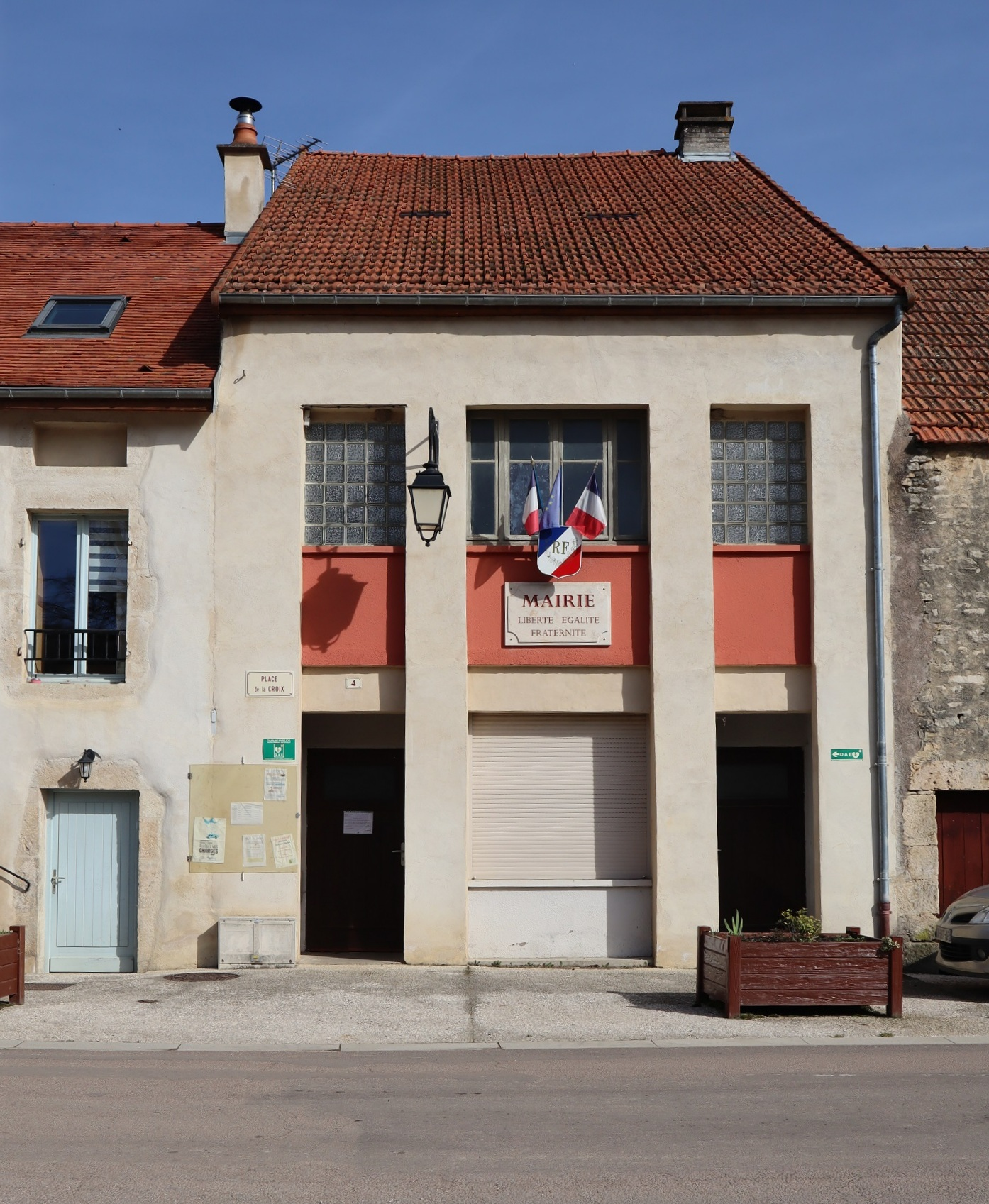
- Town hall
- Location of Gissey-sous-Flavigny
- Location within France Location within Bourgogne-Franche-Comté
- Coordinates: 47°30′48″N 4°35′29″E
- Country: France
- Region: Bourgogne-Franche-Comté
- Department: Côte-d'Or
- Arrondissement: Montbard
- Canton: Montbard

Government
  - Mayor (2020–2026): Marie-Christine Lenoir
- Area^{1}: 10.29 km^{2} (3.97 sq mi)
- Elevation: 281 m (922 ft)
- Highest elevation: 458 m (1,503 ft)
- Lowest elevation: 264 m (866 ft)
- Population (2023): 98
  - Density: 9.5/km^{2} (25/sq mi)
- Time zone: UTC+01:00 (CET)
  - Summer (DST): UTC+02:00 (CEST)
- INSEE/Postal code: 21299 /21150
- ^{1} French Land Register data, which excludes lakes, ponds, glaciers > 1 km^{2} (0.386 sq mi or 247 acres) and river estuaries.

Gissey-sous-Flavigny (French pronunciation: [ʒisɛ su flaviɲi], literally Gissey under Flavigny) is a commune in the Côte-d'Or department in eastern France.

== Population ==
Historical population
Year	Pop.	±% p.a.
1968	136	—
1975	122	−1.54%
1982	102	−2.53%
1990	93	−1.15%
1999	100	+0.81%
2007	102	+0.25%
2012	95	−1.41%
2017	88	−1.52%
2023	98	+1.81%
Source: INSEE

== See also ==
- Communes of the Côte-d'Or department
