= Corpoyer-la-Chapelle =

- Commune
- Location of Corpoyer-la-Chapelle
- Location within France Location within Bourgogne-Franche-Comté
- Coordinates: 47°32′38″N 4°36′40″E
- Country: France
- Region: Bourgogne-Franche-Comté
- Department: Côte-d'Or
- Arrondissement: Montbard
- Canton: Montbard
- Intercommunality: Pays d'Alésia et de la Seine

Government
  - Mayor (2020–2026): Michel Pivard
- Area^{1}: 4.16 km^{2} (1.61 sq mi)
- Elevation: 350 m (1,150 ft)
- Highest elevation: 445 m (1,460 ft)
- Lowest elevation: 289 m (948 ft)
- Population (2023): 38
  - Density: 9.1/km^{2} (24/sq mi)
- Time zone: UTC+01:00 (CET)
  - Summer (DST): UTC+02:00 (CEST)
- INSEE/Postal code: 21197 /21150
- ^{1} French Land Register data, which excludes lakes, ponds, glaciers > 1 km^{2} (0.386 sq mi or 247 acres) and river estuaries.

Corpoyer-la-Chapelle is a village and a commune in the Côte-d'Or department in Burgundy in eastern France.

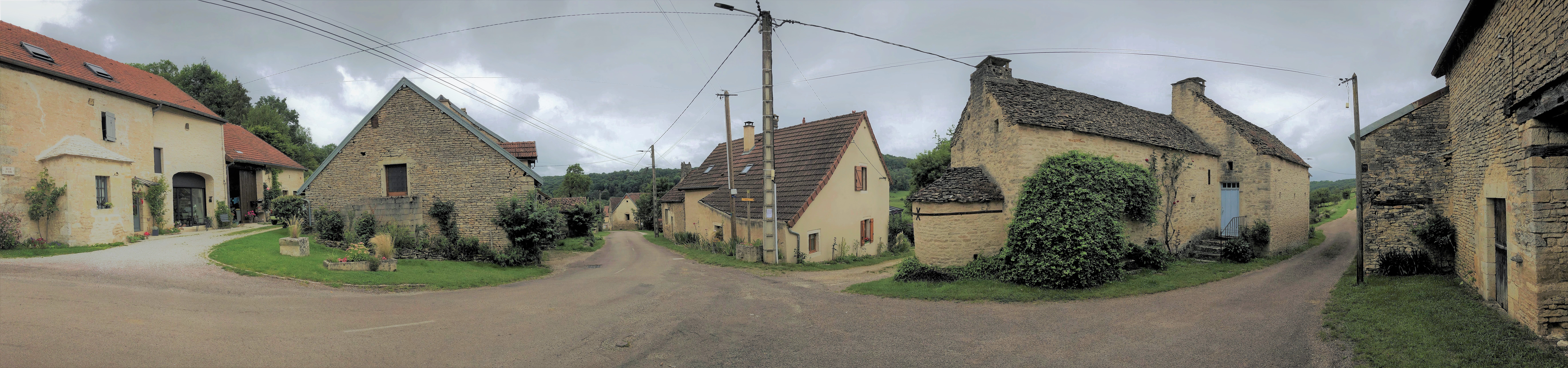
Centre of the village

== Population ==
Historical population
Year	Pop.	±% p.a.
1968	51	—
1975	25	−9.68%
1982	12	−9.95%
1990	28	+11.17%
1999	26	−0.82%
2007	22	−2.07%
2012	18	−3.93%
2017	29	+10.01%
2023	38	+4.61%
Source: INSEE

== See also ==
- Communes of the Côte-d'Or department
