= Jailly-les-Moulins =

- Commune
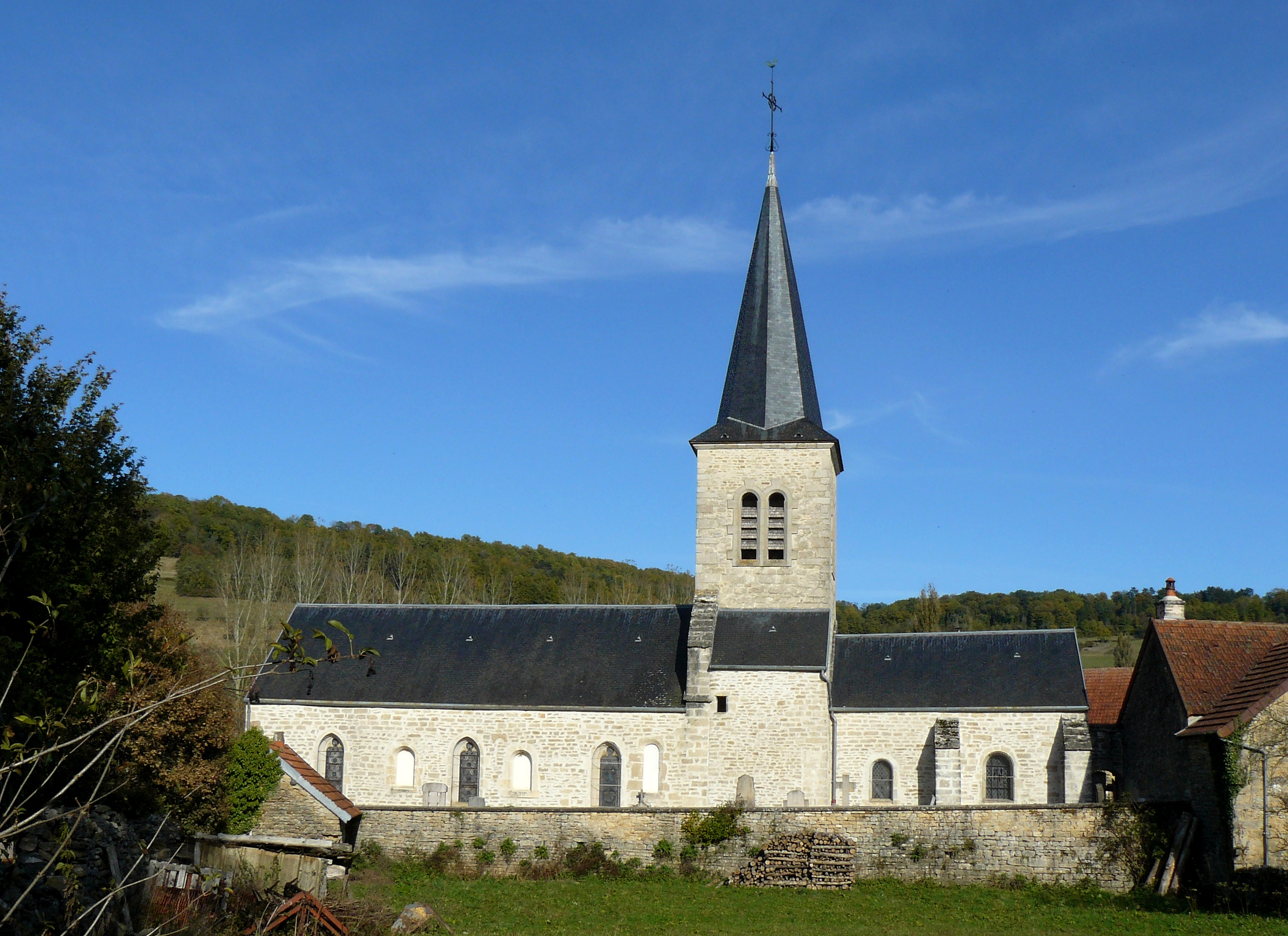
- The church in Jailly-les-Moulins
- Location of Jailly-les-Moulins
- Location within France Location within Bourgogne-Franche-Comté
- Coordinates: 47°27′36″N 4°35′56″E
- Country: France
- Region: Bourgogne-Franche-Comté
- Department: Côte-d'Or
- Arrondissement: Montbard
- Canton: Montbard
- Intercommunality: Pays d'Alésia et de la Seine

Government
  - Mayor (2020–2026): Michel Carré
- Area^{1}: 9.29 km^{2} (3.59 sq mi)
- Elevation: 310 m (1,020 ft)
- Highest elevation: 500 m (1,600 ft)
- Lowest elevation: 294 m (965 ft)
- Population (2023): 76
  - Density: 8.2/km^{2} (21/sq mi)
- Time zone: UTC+01:00 (CET)
  - Summer (DST): UTC+02:00 (CEST)
- INSEE/Postal code: 21321 /21150
- ^{1} French Land Register data, which excludes lakes, ponds, glaciers > 1 km^{2} (0.386 sq mi or 247 acres) and river estuaries.

Jailly-les-Moulins (French pronunciation: [ʒaji le mulɛ̃]) is a commune in the Côte-d'Or department in eastern France.

== Population ==
Historical population
Year	Pop.	±% p.a.
1968	130	—
1975	116	−1.61%
1982	117	+0.12%
1990	116	−0.11%
1999	103	−1.31%
2007	93	−1.27%
2012	98	+1.05%
2017	82	−3.50%
2023	76	−1.26%
Source: INSEE

== See also ==
- Communes of the Côte-d'Or department
