= Seigny =

- Commune
- Location of Seigny
- Location within France Location within Bourgogne-Franche-Comté
- Coordinates: 47°34′27″N 4°26′05″E
- Country: France
- Region: Bourgogne-Franche-Comté
- Department: Côte-d'Or
- Arrondissement: Montbard
- Canton: Montbard

Government
  - Mayor (2024–2026): Alain Bois
- Area^{1}: 7.99 km^{2} (3.08 sq mi)
- Elevation: 235 m (771 ft)
- Highest elevation: 395 m (1,296 ft)
- Lowest elevation: 221 m (725 ft)
- Population (2023): 151
  - Density: 18.9/km^{2} (48.9/sq mi)
- Time zone: UTC+01:00 (CET)
  - Summer (DST): UTC+02:00 (CEST)
- INSEE/Postal code: 21598 /21150
- ^{1} French Land Register data, which excludes lakes, ponds, glaciers > 1 km^{2} (0.386 sq mi or 247 acres) and river estuaries.

Seigny (French pronunciation: [sɛɲi]) is a commune in the Côte-d'Or department in eastern France.

== Population ==
Historical population
Year	Pop.	±% p.a.
1968	181	—
1975	170	−0.89%
1982	164	−0.51%
1990	164	+0.00%
1999	152	−0.84%
2007	163	+0.88%
2012	162	−0.12%
2017	172	+1.21%
2023	151	−2.15%
Source: INSEE

== See also ==
- Communes of the Côte-d'Or department
