= Darcey =

- Commune
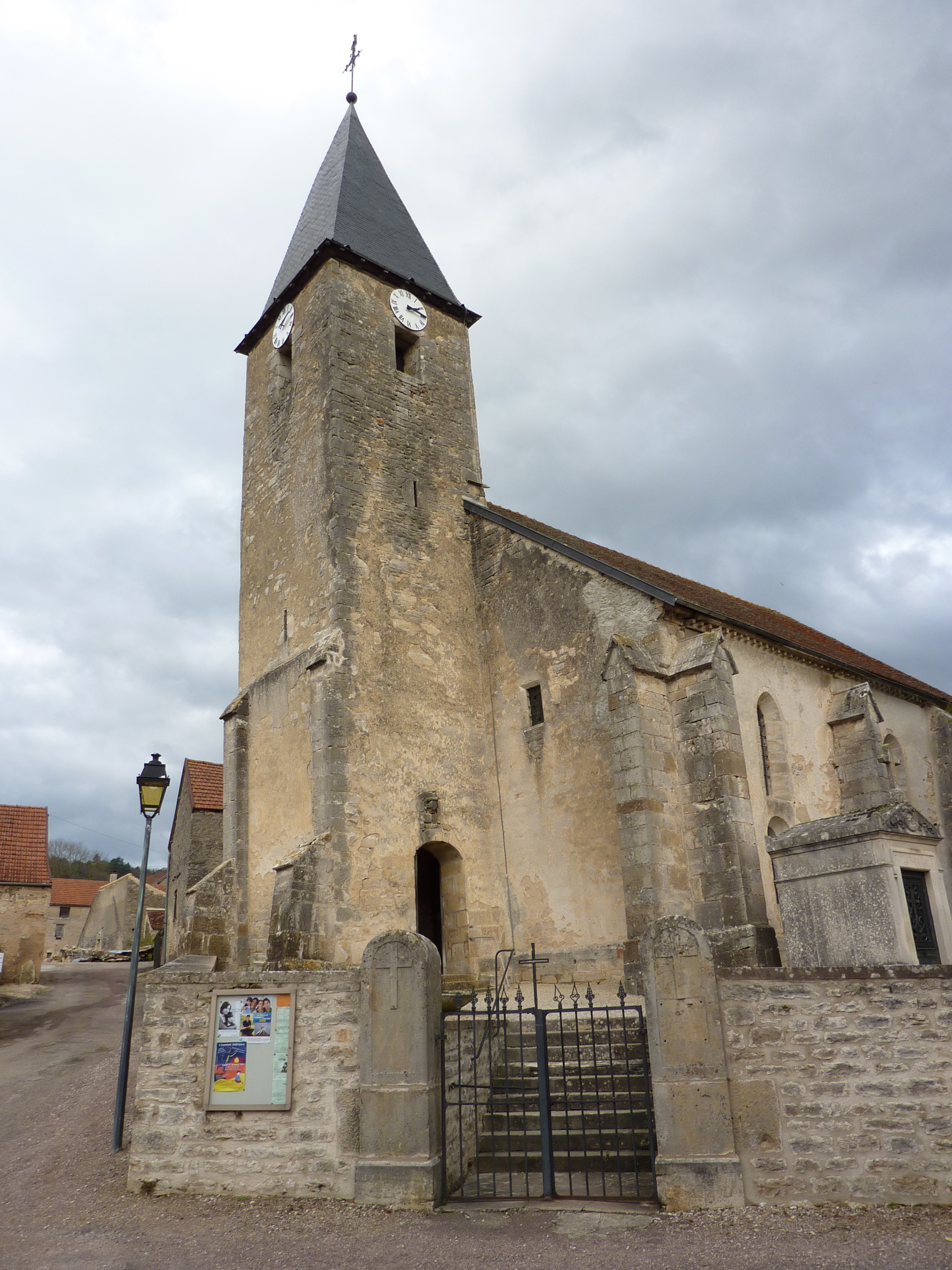
- The church in Darcey

- Coat of arms
- Location of Darcey
- Location within France Location within Bourgogne-Franche-Comté
- Coordinates: 47°33′05″N 4°34′14″E
- Country: France
- Region: Bourgogne-Franche-Comté
- Department: Côte-d'Or
- Arrondissement: Montbard
- Canton: Montbard

Government
  - Mayor (2020–2026): Bernard Franjou
- Area^{1}: 18.91 km^{2} (7.30 sq mi)
- Elevation: 233 m (764 ft)
- Highest elevation: 446 m (1,463 ft)
- Lowest elevation: 253 m (830 ft)
- Population (2023): 330
  - Density: 17/km^{2} (45/sq mi)
- Time zone: UTC+01:00 (CET)
  - Summer (DST): UTC+02:00 (CEST)
- INSEE/Postal code: 21226 /21150
- ^{1} French Land Register data, which excludes lakes, ponds, glaciers > 1 km^{2} (0.386 sq mi or 247 acres) and river estuaries.

Darcey (French pronunciation: [daʁsɛ]) is a commune in the Côte-d'Or department in the Bourgogne-Franche-Comté region of eastern France.

== Population ==
Historical population
Year	Pop.	±% p.a.
1968	437	—
1975	394	−1.47%
1982	336	−2.25%
1990	328	−0.30%
1999	301	−0.95%
2007	328	+1.08%
2012	343	+0.90%
2017	338	−0.29%
2023	330	−0.40%
Source: INSEE

== See also ==
- Communes of the Côte-d'Or department
