= Quincy-le-Vicomte =

- Commune
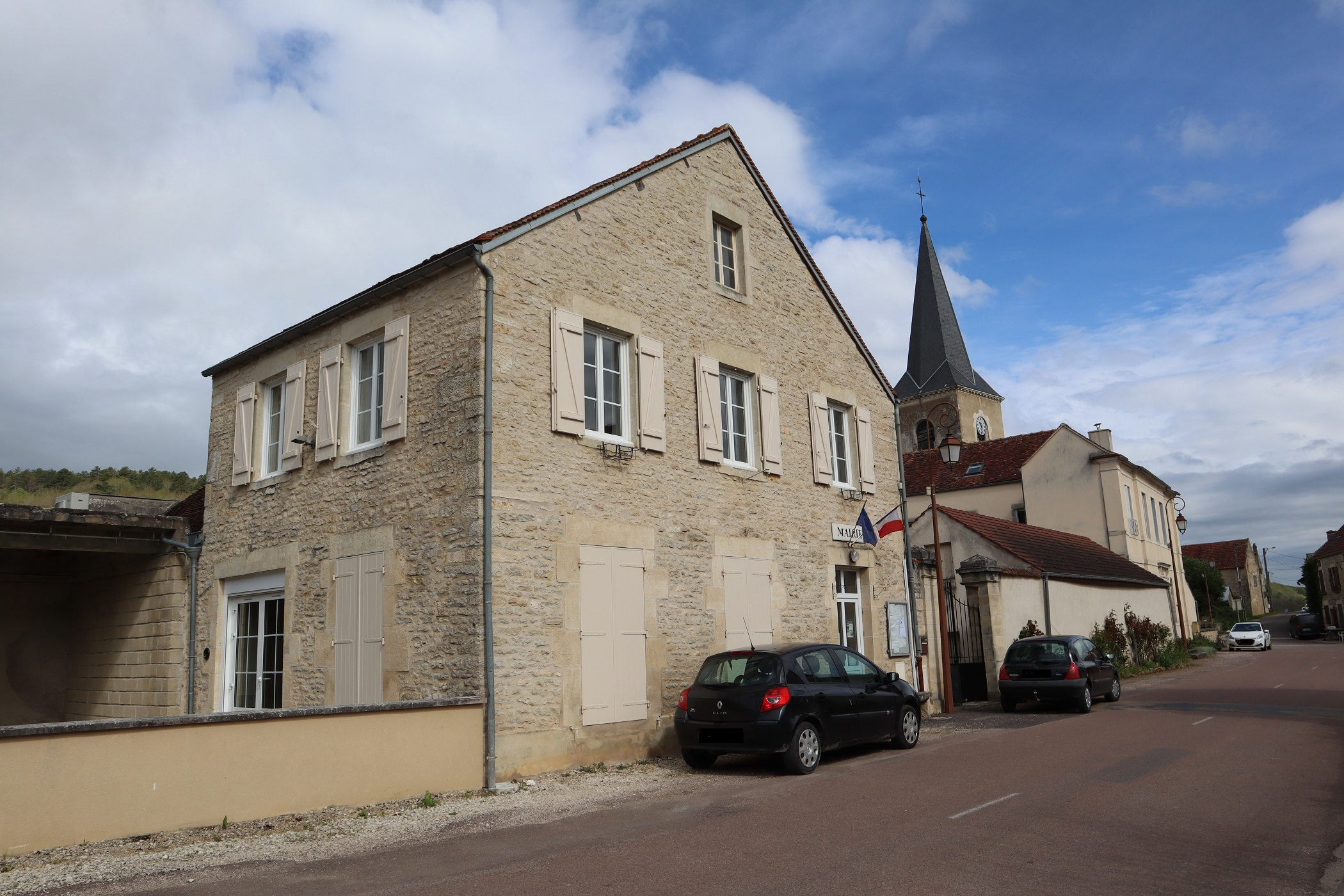
- Quincy-le-Vicomte Town hall
- Location of Quincy-le-Vicomte
- Location within France Location within Bourgogne-Franche-Comté
- Coordinates: 47°36′31″N 4°15′22″E
- Country: France
- Region: Bourgogne-Franche-Comté
- Department: Côte-d'Or
- Arrondissement: Montbard
- Canton: Montbard

Government
  - Mayor (2020–2026): Alain Becard
- Area^{1}: 19.03 km^{2} (7.35 sq mi)
- Elevation: 310 m (1,020 ft)
- Highest elevation: 354 m (1,161 ft)
- Lowest elevation: 202 m (663 ft)
- Population (2023): 207
  - Density: 10.9/km^{2} (28.2/sq mi)
- Time zone: UTC+01:00 (CET)
  - Summer (DST): UTC+02:00 (CEST)
- INSEE/Postal code: 21518 /21500
- ^{1} French Land Register data, which excludes lakes, ponds, glaciers > 1 km^{2} (0.386 sq mi or 247 acres) and river estuaries.

Quincy-le-Vicomte (French pronunciation: [kɛ̃si lə vikɔ̃t]) is a commune in the Côte-d'Or department in eastern France.

== Population ==
Historical population
Year	Pop.	±% p.a.
1968	209	—
1975	183	−1.88%
1982	171	−0.96%
1990	172	+0.07%
1999	193	+1.29%
2007	198	+0.32%
2012	196	−0.20%
2017	211	+1.49%
2023	207	−0.32%
Source: INSEE

== See also ==
- Communes of the Côte-d'Or department
