= Nogent-lès-Montbard =

- Commune
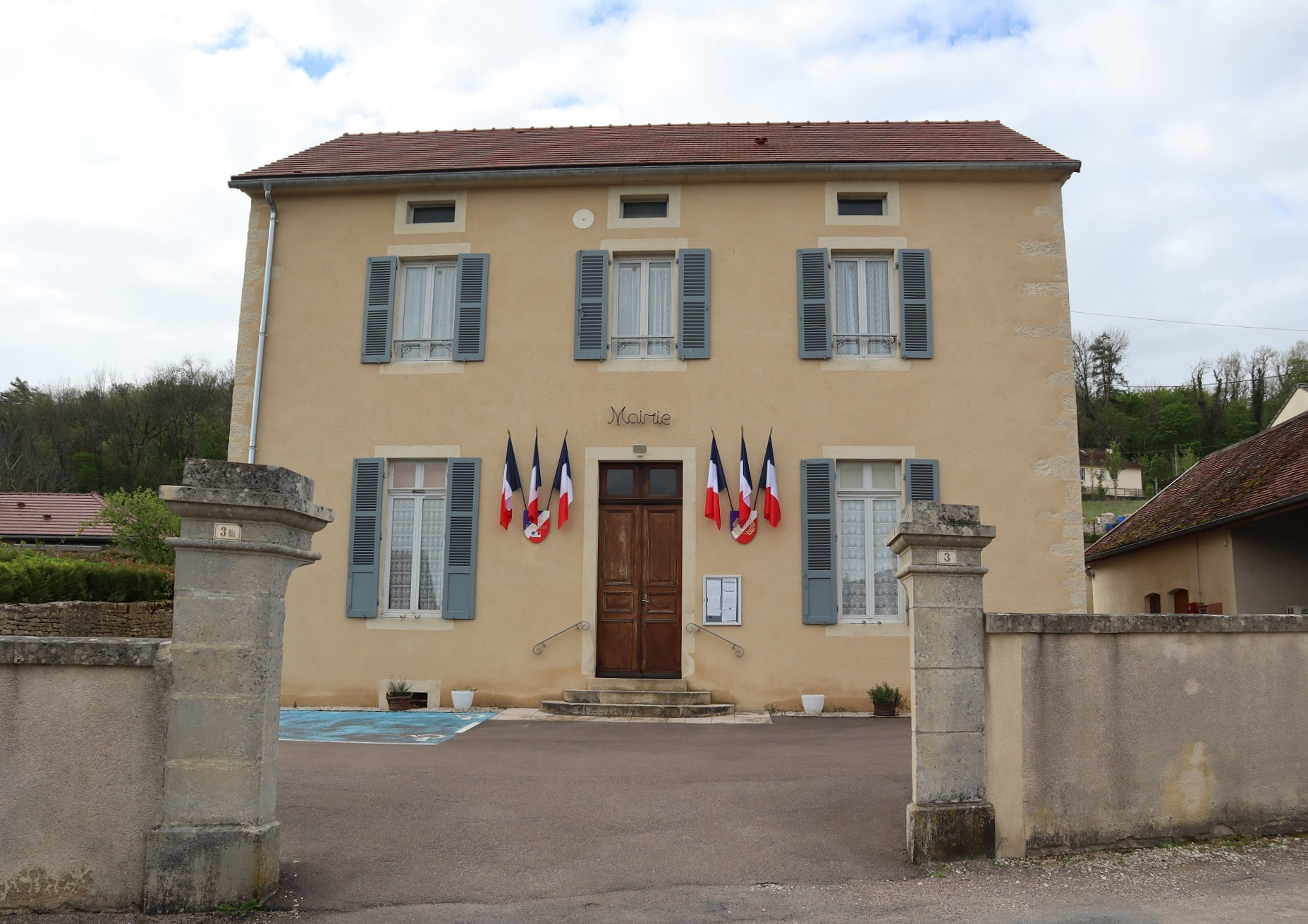
- Town hall
- Location of Nogent-lès-Montbard
- Location within France Location within Bourgogne-Franche-Comté
- Coordinates: 47°36′32″N 4°22′56″E
- Country: France
- Region: Bourgogne-Franche-Comté
- Department: Côte-d'Or
- Arrondissement: Montbard
- Canton: Montbard

Government
  - Mayor (2022–2026): Jocelyne Joly
- Area^{1}: 6.45 km^{2} (2.49 sq mi)
- Elevation: 245 m (804 ft)
- Highest elevation: 361 m (1,184 ft)
- Lowest elevation: 211 m (692 ft)
- Population (2023): 153
  - Density: 23.7/km^{2} (61.4/sq mi)
- Time zone: UTC+01:00 (CET)
  - Summer (DST): UTC+02:00 (CEST)
- INSEE/Postal code: 21456 /21500
- ^{1} French Land Register data, which excludes lakes, ponds, glaciers > 1 km^{2} (0.386 sq mi or 247 acres) and river estuaries.

Nogent-lès-Montbard (French pronunciation: [nɔʒɑ̃ lɛ mɔ̃baʁ], literally Nogent near Montbard) is a commune in the Côte-d'Or department in eastern France.

== Population ==
Historical population
| Year | Pop. | ±% p.a. |
|---|---|---|
| 1968 | 214 | — |
| 1975 | 181 | −2.36% |
| 1982 | 189 | +0.62% |
| 1990 | 175 | −0.96% |
| 1999 | 171 | −0.26% |
| 2007 | 143 | −2.21% |
| 2012 | 157 | +1.89% |
| 2017 | 155 | −0.26% |
| 2023 | 153 | −0.22% |
Source: INSEE

== See also ==
- Communes of the Côte-d'Or department
