= Hauteroche, Côte-d'Or =

Hauteroche
- Commune
- Coat of arms
- Location of Hauteroche
- Location within France Location within Bourgogne-Franche-Comté
- Coordinates: 47°30′05″N 4°34′55″E
- Country: France
- Region: Bourgogne-Franche-Comté
- Department: Côte-d'Or
- Arrondissement: Montbard
- Canton: Montbard

Government
  - Mayor (2020–2026): Pascal Blandin
- Area^{1}: 13.28 km^{2} (5.13 sq mi)
- Elevation: 360 m (1,180 ft)
- Highest elevation: 472 m (1,549 ft)
- Lowest elevation: 270 m (890 ft)
- Population (2023): 76
  - Density: 5.7/km^{2} (15/sq mi)
- Time zone: UTC+01:00 (CET)
  - Summer (DST): UTC+02:00 (CEST)
- INSEE/Postal code: 21314 /21150
- ^{1} French Land Register data, which excludes lakes, ponds, glaciers > 1 km^{2} (0.386 sq mi or 247 acres) and river estuaries.

Hauteroche (French pronunciation: [otʁɔʃ]) is a commune in the Côte-d'Or department in eastern France.

== Population ==
Historical population
| Year | Pop. | ±% p.a. |
|---|---|---|
| 1968 | 95 | — |
| 1975 | 72 | −3.88% |
| 1982 | 74 | +0.39% |
| 1990 | 86 | +1.90% |
| 1999 | 83 | −0.39% |
| 2007 | 76 | −1.10% |
| 2012 | 73 | −0.80% |
| 2017 | 80 | +1.85% |
| 2023 | 76 | −0.85% |
Source: INSEE

== See also ==
- Communes of the Côte-d'Or department
