= Canton of Montbard =

Coordinates: 47.62°N 4.34°E

The canton of Montbard is an administrative division of the Côte-d'Or department, eastern France. Its borders were modified at the French canton reorganisation which came into effect in March 2015. Its seat is in Montbard.

It consists of the following communes:

1. Alise-Sainte-Reine
2. Arrans
3. Asnières-en-Montagne
4. Athie
5. Benoisey
6. Boux-sous-Salmaise
7. Buffon
8. Bussy-le-Grand
9. Champ-d'Oiseau
10. Charencey
11. Corpoyer-la-Chapelle
12. Courcelles-lès-Montbard
13. Crépand
14. Darcey
15. Éringes
16. Étais
17. Fain-lès-Montbard
18. Fain-lès-Moutiers
19. Flavigny-sur-Ozerain
20. Fontaines-les-Sèches
21. Fresnes
22. Frôlois
23. Gissey-sous-Flavigny
24. Grésigny-Sainte-Reine
25. Grignon
26. Hauteroche
27. Jailly-les-Moulins
28. Lucenay-le-Duc
29. Marigny-le-Cahouët
30. Marmagne
31. Ménétreux-le-Pitois
32. Montbard
33. Montigny-Montfort
34. Moutiers-Saint-Jean
35. Mussy-la-Fosse
36. Nesle-et-Massoult
37. Nogent-lès-Montbard
38. Planay
39. Pouillenay
40. Quincerot
41. Quincy-le-Vicomte
42. La Roche-Vanneau
43. Rougemont
44. Saint-Germain-lès-Senailly
45. Saint-Rémy
46. Salmaise
47. Seigny
48. Senailly
49. Source-Seine
50. Thenissey
51. Touillon
52. Venarey-les-Laumes
53. Verdonnet
54. Verrey-sous-Salmaise
55. Villaines-les-Prévôtes
56. La Villeneuve-les-Convers
57. Viserny
