= Ménétreux-le-Pitois =

- Commune
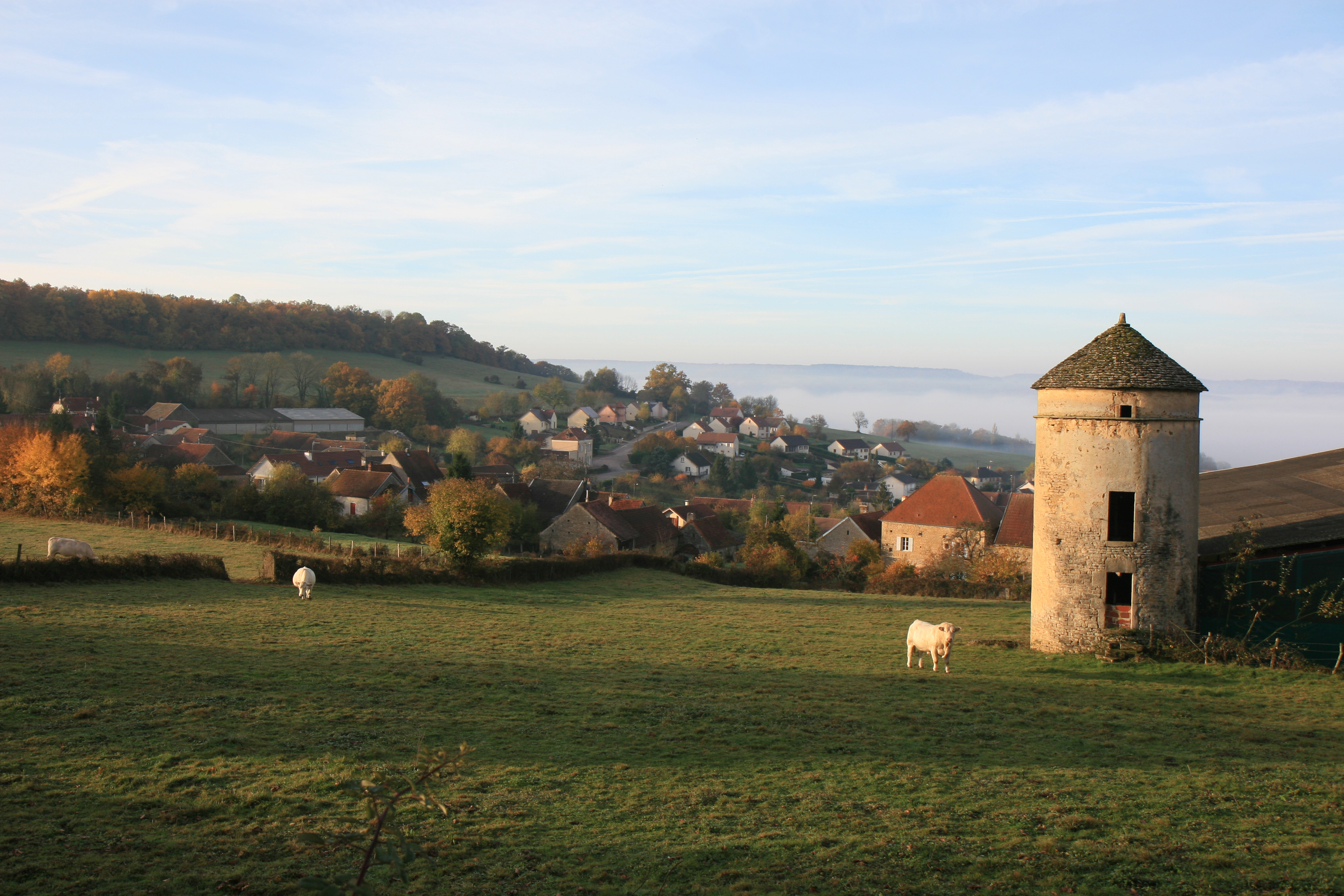
- A general view of Ménétreux-le-Pitois

- Coat of arms
- Location of Ménétreux-le-Pitois
- Location within France Location within Bourgogne-Franche-Comté
- Coordinates: 47°33′34″N 4°28′19″E
- Country: France
- Region: Bourgogne-Franche-Comté
- Department: Côte-d'Or
- Arrondissement: Montbard
- Canton: Montbard

Government
  - Mayor (2020–2026): Yvon Fiorucci
- Area^{1}: 6.62 km^{2} (2.56 sq mi)
- Elevation: 240 m (790 ft)
- Highest elevation: 397 m (1,302 ft)
- Lowest elevation: 228 m (748 ft)
- Population (2023): 389
  - Density: 58.8/km^{2} (152/sq mi)
- Time zone: UTC+01:00 (CET)
  - Summer (DST): UTC+02:00 (CEST)
- INSEE/Postal code: 21404 /21150
- ^{1} French Land Register data, which excludes lakes, ponds, glaciers > 1 km^{2} (0.386 sq mi or 247 acres) and river estuaries.

Ménétreux-le-Pitois (French pronunciation: [menetʁø lə pitwa]) is a commune in the Côte-d'Or department in eastern France.

== Population ==
Historical population
Year	Pop.	±% p.a.
1968	299	—
1975	400	+4.25%
1982	461	+2.05%
1990	467	+0.16%
1999	426	−1.02%
2007	430	+0.12%
2012	442	+0.55%
2017	427	−0.69%
2023	389	−1.54%
Source: INSEE

== See also ==
- Communes of the Côte-d'Or department
