= Éringes =

- Commune
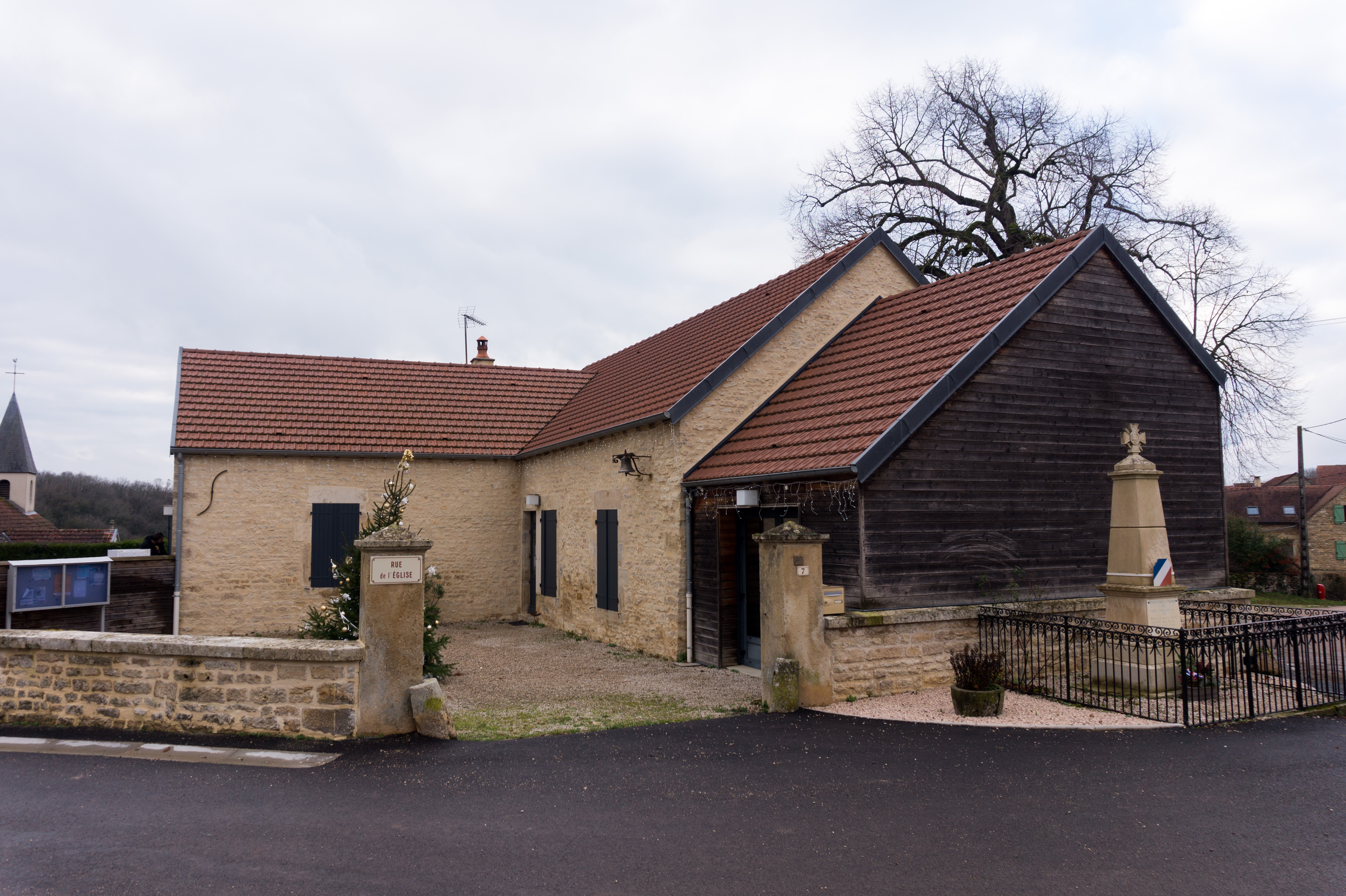
- Eringes Town hall
- Location of Éringes
- Location within France Location within Bourgogne-Franche-Comté
- Coordinates: 47°35′34″N 4°27′54″E
- Country: France
- Region: Bourgogne-Franche-Comté
- Department: Côte-d'Or
- Arrondissement: Montbard
- Canton: Montbard

Government
  - Mayor (2020–2026): Éric Astolfi
- Area^{1}: 6.01 km^{2} (2.32 sq mi)
- Elevation: 420 m (1,380 ft)
- Highest elevation: 417 m (1,368 ft)
- Lowest elevation: 275 m (902 ft)
- Population (2023): 56
  - Density: 9.3/km^{2} (24/sq mi)
- Time zone: UTC+01:00 (CET)
  - Summer (DST): UTC+02:00 (CEST)
- INSEE/Postal code: 21248 /21500
- ^{1} French Land Register data, which excludes lakes, ponds, glaciers > 1 km^{2} (0.386 sq mi or 247 acres) and river estuaries.

Éringes (French pronunciation: [eʁɛ̃ʒ]) is a commune in the Côte-d'Or department in eastern France.

== Population ==
Historical population
| Year | Pop. | ±% p.a. |
|---|---|---|
| 1968 | 99 | — |
| 1975 | 96 | −0.44% |
| 1982 | 82 | −2.23% |
| 1990 | 70 | −1.96% |
| 1999 | 71 | +0.16% |
| 2007 | 66 | −0.91% |
| 2012 | 73 | +2.04% |
| 2017 | 68 | −1.41% |
| 2023 | 56 | −3.18% |
Source: INSEE

== See also ==
- Communes of the Côte-d'Or department
