= Grésigny-Sainte-Reine =

- Commune
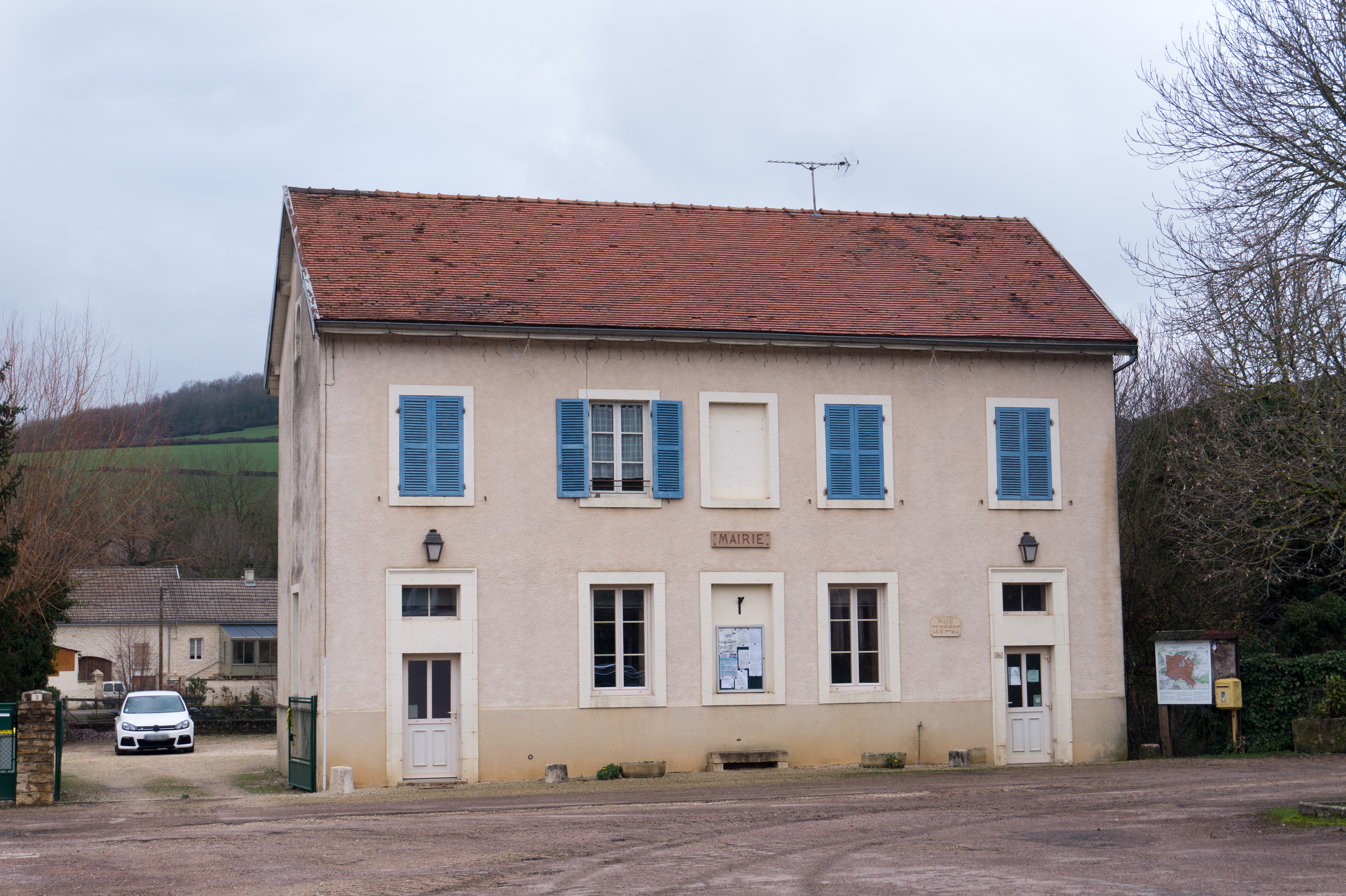
- Town hall

- Coat of arms
- Location of Grésigny-Sainte-Reine
- Location within France Location within Bourgogne-Franche-Comté
- Coordinates: 47°33′29″N 4°30′09″E
- Country: France
- Region: Bourgogne-Franche-Comté
- Department: Côte-d'Or
- Arrondissement: Montbard
- Canton: Montbard

Government
  - Mayor (2020–2026): Eric Perrin
- Area^{1}: 7.06 km^{2} (2.73 sq mi)
- Elevation: 255 m (837 ft)
- Highest elevation: 400 m (1,300 ft)
- Lowest elevation: 238 m (781 ft)
- Population (2023): 147
  - Density: 20.8/km^{2} (53.9/sq mi)
- Time zone: UTC+01:00 (CET)
  - Summer (DST): UTC+02:00 (CEST)
- INSEE/Postal code: 21307 /21150
- ^{1} French Land Register data, which excludes lakes, ponds, glaciers > 1 km^{2} (0.386 sq mi or 247 acres) and river estuaries.

Grésigny-Sainte-Reine (French pronunciation: [ɡʁeziɲi sɛ̃t ʁɛn]) is a commune in the Côte-d'Or department in eastern France.

== Population ==
Historical population
| Year | Pop. | ±% p.a. |
|---|---|---|
| 1968 | 167 | — |
| 1975 | 179 | +1.00% |
| 1982 | 153 | −2.22% |
| 1990 | 138 | −1.28% |
| 1999 | 153 | +1.15% |
| 2007 | 134 | −1.64% |
| 2012 | 141 | +1.02% |
| 2017 | 142 | +0.14% |
| 2023 | 147 | +0.58% |
Source: INSEE

== See also ==
- Communes of the Côte-d'Or department
