= Rougemont, Côte-d'Or =

Rougemont
- Commune
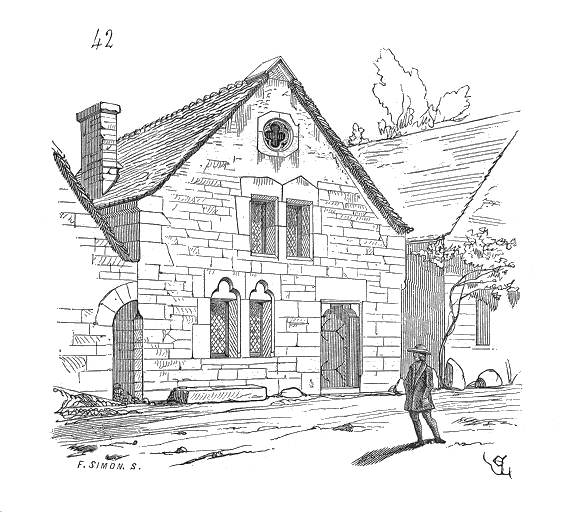
- A mediaeval house in Rougemont
- Location of Rougemont
- Location within France Location within Bourgogne-Franche-Comté
- Coordinates: 47°40′09″N 4°14′43″E
- Country: France
- Region: Bourgogne-Franche-Comté
- Department: Côte-d'Or
- Arrondissement: Montbard
- Canton: Montbard

Government
  - Mayor (2023–2026): Christelle Prin-Kaehrling
- Area^{1}: 9.52 km^{2} (3.68 sq mi)
- Elevation: 236 m (774 ft)
- Highest elevation: 332 m (1,089 ft)
- Lowest elevation: 192 m (630 ft)
- Population (2023): 143
  - Density: 15.0/km^{2} (38.9/sq mi)
- Time zone: UTC+01:00 (CET)
  - Summer (DST): UTC+02:00 (CEST)
- INSEE/Postal code: 21530 /21500
- ^{1} French Land Register data, which excludes lakes, ponds, glaciers > 1 km^{2} (0.386 sq mi or 247 acres) and river estuaries.

Rougemont (French pronunciation: [ʁuʒmɔ̃]) is a commune in the Côte-d'Or department in eastern France.

== Population ==
Historical population
Year	Pop.	±% p.a.
1968	223	—
1975	192	−2.12%
1982	167	−1.97%
1990	158	−0.69%
1999	170	+0.82%
2007	172	+0.15%
2012	175	+0.35%
2017	156	−2.27%
2023	143	−1.44%
Source: INSEE

== See also ==
- Communes of the Côte-d'Or department
