= La Villeneuve-les-Convers =

- Commune
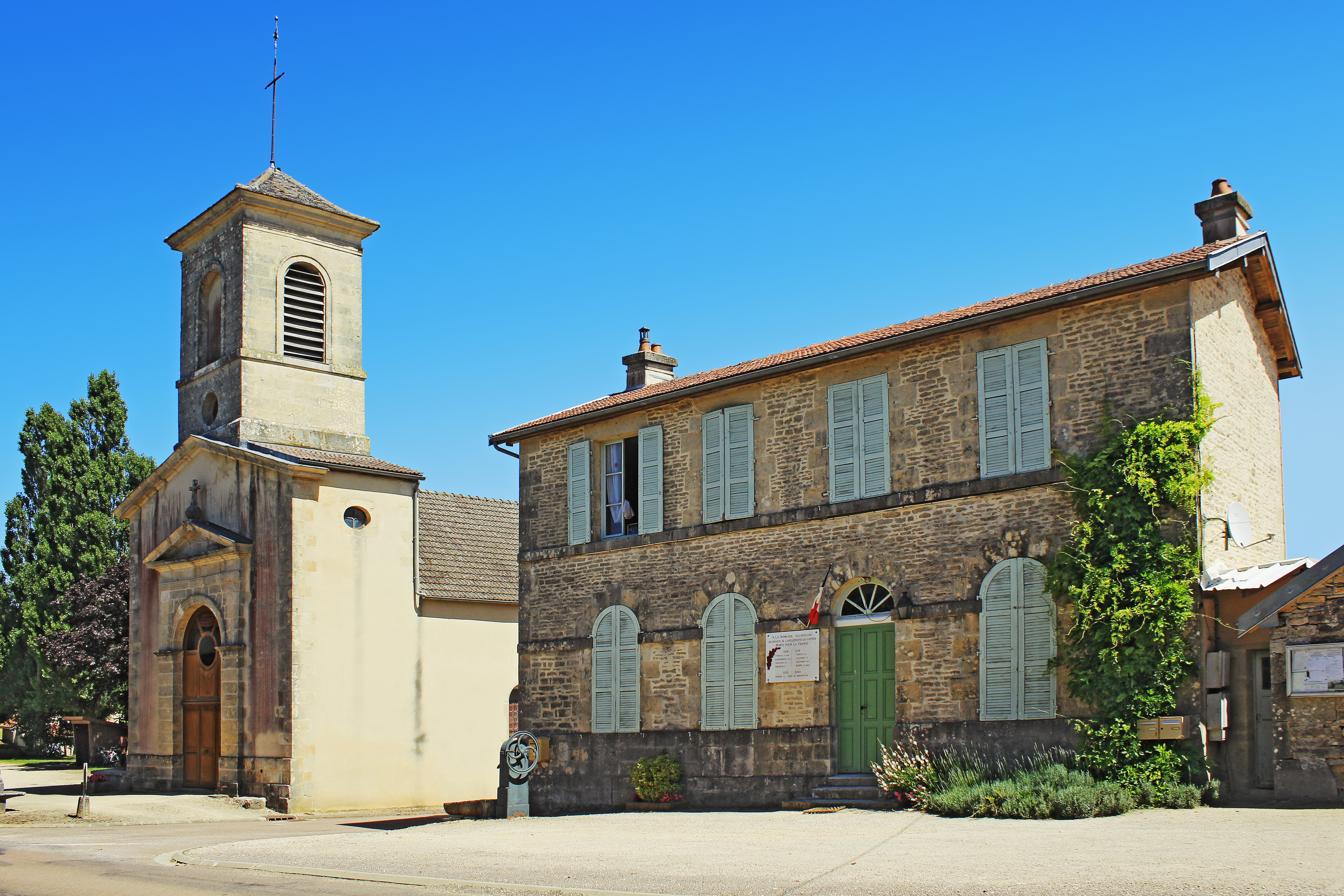
- The town hall and church in La Villeneuve-les-Convers
- Location of La Villeneuve-les-Convers
- Location within France Location within Bourgogne-Franche-Comté
- Coordinates: 47°34′23″N 4°34′37″E
- Country: France
- Region: Bourgogne-Franche-Comté
- Department: Côte-d'Or
- Arrondissement: Montbard
- Canton: Montbard
- Intercommunality: Pays d'Alésia et de la Seine

Government
  - Mayor (2020–2026): Jean-Raphaël Cendrier
- Area^{1}: 8.88 km^{2} (3.43 sq mi)
- Elevation: 400 m (1,300 ft)
- Highest elevation: 423 m (1,388 ft)
- Lowest elevation: 363 m (1,191 ft)
- Population (2023): 56
  - Density: 6.3/km^{2} (16/sq mi)
- Time zone: UTC+01:00 (CET)
  - Summer (DST): UTC+02:00 (CEST)
- INSEE/Postal code: 21695 /21450
- ^{1} French Land Register data, which excludes lakes, ponds, glaciers > 1 km^{2} (0.386 sq mi or 247 acres) and river estuaries.

La Villeneuve-les-Convers (French pronunciation: [la vilnœv le kɔ̃vɛʁ]) is a commune in the Côte-d'Or department in eastern France.

== Population ==
Historical population
Year	Pop.	±% p.a.
1968	55	—
1975	52	−0.80%
1982	52	+0.00%
1990	43	−2.35%
1999	35	−2.26%
2007	40	+1.68%
2012	41	+0.50%
2017	52	+4.87%
2023	56	+1.24%
Source: INSEE

== See also ==
- Communes of the Côte-d'Or department
