= Mussy-la-Fosse =

- Commune
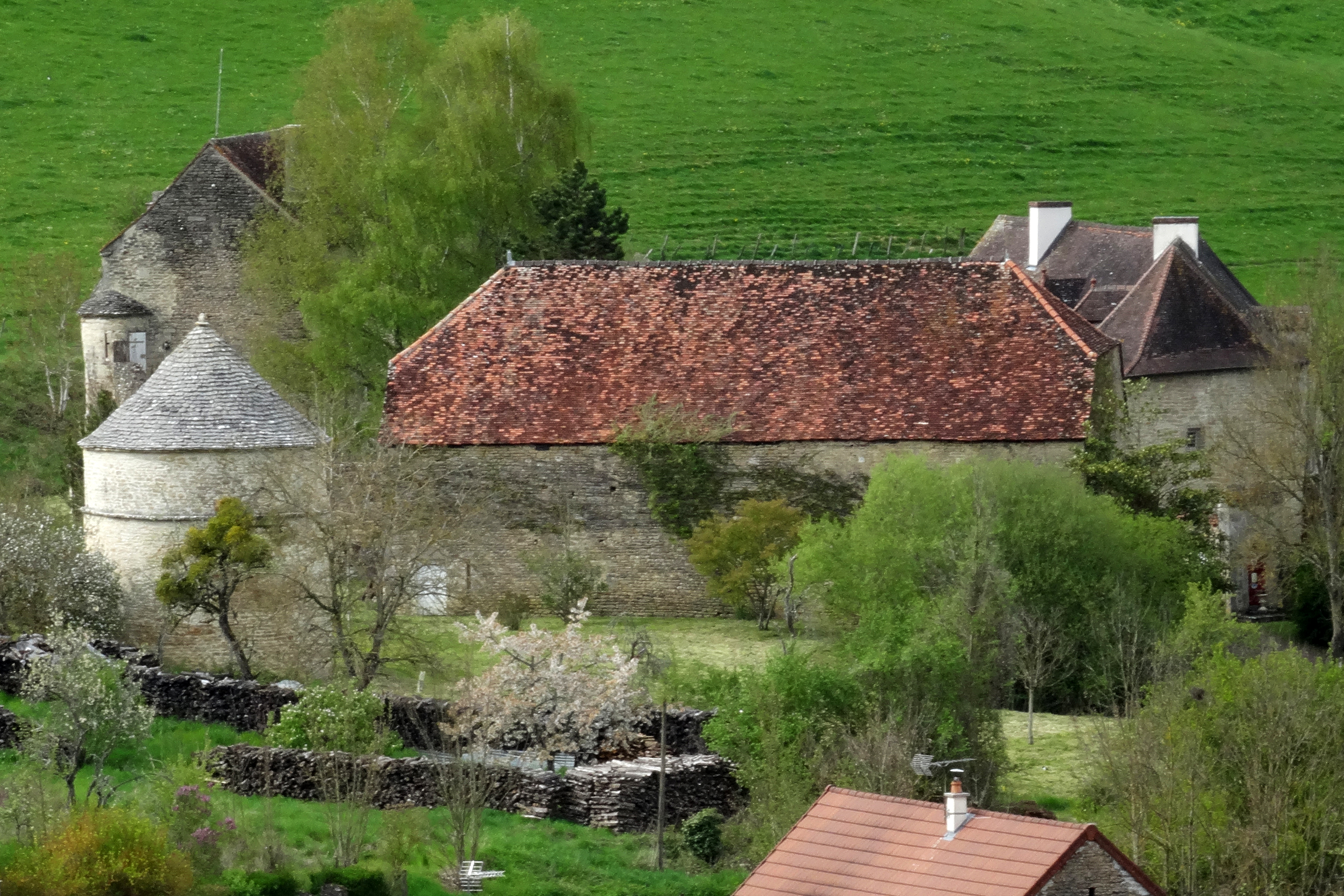
- A view within Mussy-la-Fosse

- Coat of arms
- Location of Mussy-la-Fosse
- Location within France Location within Bourgogne-Franche-Comté
- Coordinates: 47°31′19″N 4°26′19″E
- Country: France
- Region: Bourgogne-Franche-Comté
- Department: Côte-d'Or
- Arrondissement: Montbard
- Canton: Montbard

Government
  - Mayor (2020–2026): Denis Charlot
- Area^{1}: 4.45 km^{2} (1.72 sq mi)
- Elevation: 250 m (820 ft)
- Highest elevation: 427 m (1,401 ft)
- Lowest elevation: 237 m (778 ft)
- Population (2023): 96
  - Density: 22/km^{2} (56/sq mi)
- Time zone: UTC+01:00 (CET)
  - Summer (DST): UTC+02:00 (CEST)
- INSEE/Postal code: 21448 /21150
- ^{1} French Land Register data, which excludes lakes, ponds, glaciers > 1 km^{2} (0.386 sq mi or 247 acres) and river estuaries.

Mussy-la-Fosse (French pronunciation: [mysi la fos]) is a commune in the Côte-d'Or department in eastern France.

== Population ==
Historical population
Year	Pop.	±% p.a.
1968	93	—
1975	86	−1.11%
1982	86	+0.00%
1990	92	+0.85%
1999	87	−0.62%
2007	80	−1.04%
2012	75	−1.28%
2017	86	+2.77%
2023	96	+1.85%
Source: INSEE

== See also ==
- Communes of the Côte-d'Or department
