= Courcelles-lès-Montbard =

- Commune
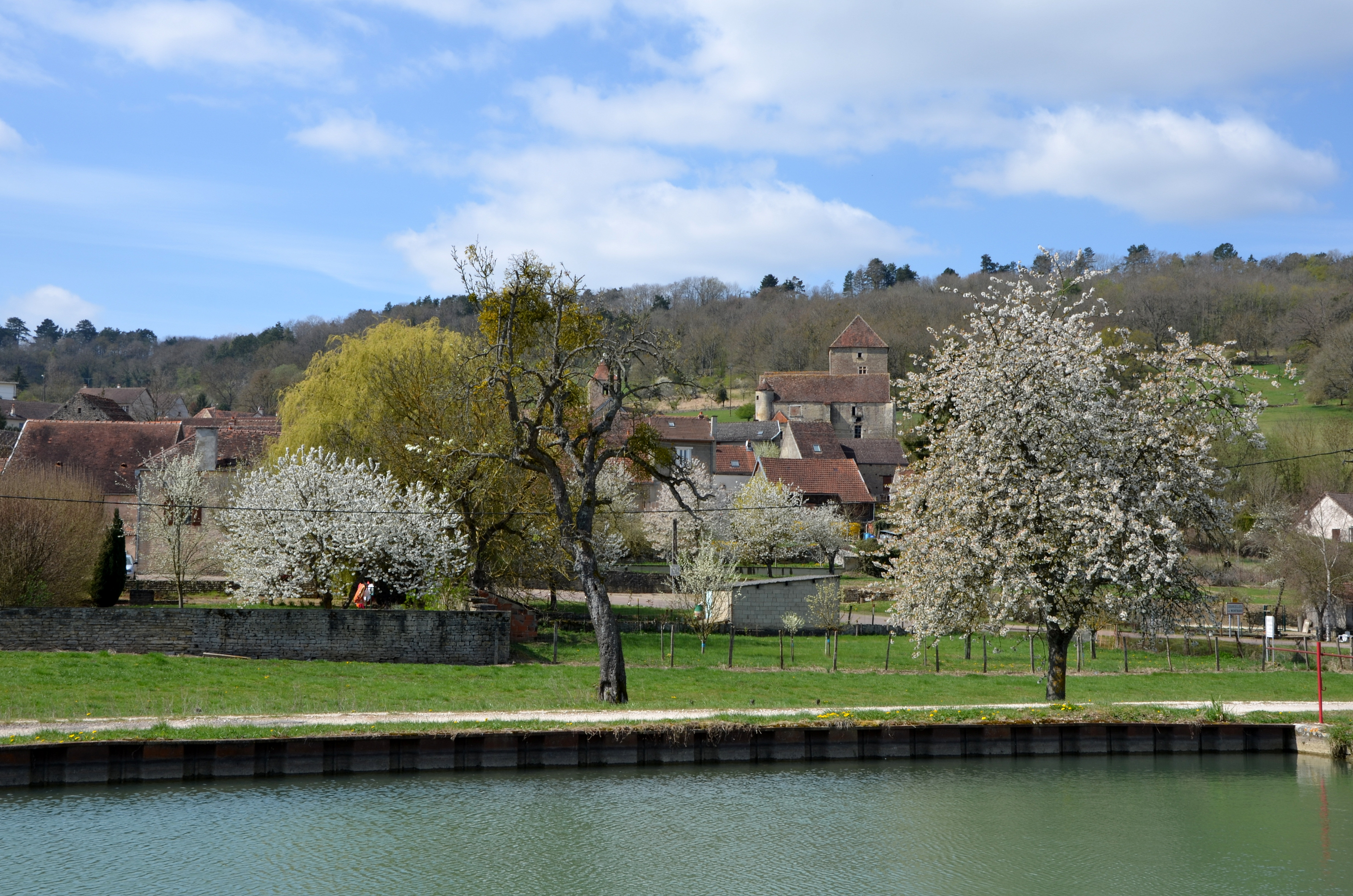
- A general view of Courcelles-lès-Montbard
- Location of Courcelles-lès-Montbard
- Location within France Location within Bourgogne-Franche-Comté
- Coordinates: 47°35′40″N 4°23′54″E
- Country: France
- Region: Bourgogne-Franche-Comté
- Department: Côte-d'Or
- Arrondissement: Montbard
- Canton: Montbard

Government
  - Mayor (2020–2026): Yacim Hadine
- Area^{1}: 6.12 km^{2} (2.36 sq mi)
- Elevation: 260 m (850 ft)
- Highest elevation: 375 m (1,230 ft)
- Lowest elevation: 214 m (702 ft)
- Population (2023): 85
  - Density: 14/km^{2} (36/sq mi)
- Time zone: UTC+01:00 (CET)
  - Summer (DST): UTC+02:00 (CEST)
- INSEE/Postal code: 21204 /21500
- ^{1} French Land Register data, which excludes lakes, ponds, glaciers > 1 km^{2} (0.386 sq mi or 247 acres) and river estuaries.

Courcelles-lès-Montbard (French pronunciation: [kuʁsɛl lɛ mɔ̃baʁ], literally Courcelles near Montbard) is a commune in the Côte-d'Or department in eastern France.

== Population ==
Historical population
Year	Pop.	±% p.a.
1968	117	—
1975	92	−3.38%
1982	79	−2.15%
1990	116	+4.92%
1999	102	−1.42%
2007	92	−1.28%
2012	82	−2.28%
2017	80	−0.49%
2023	85	+1.02%
Source: INSEE

== See also ==
- Communes of the Côte-d'Or department
