= Villaines-les-Prévôtes =

- Commune
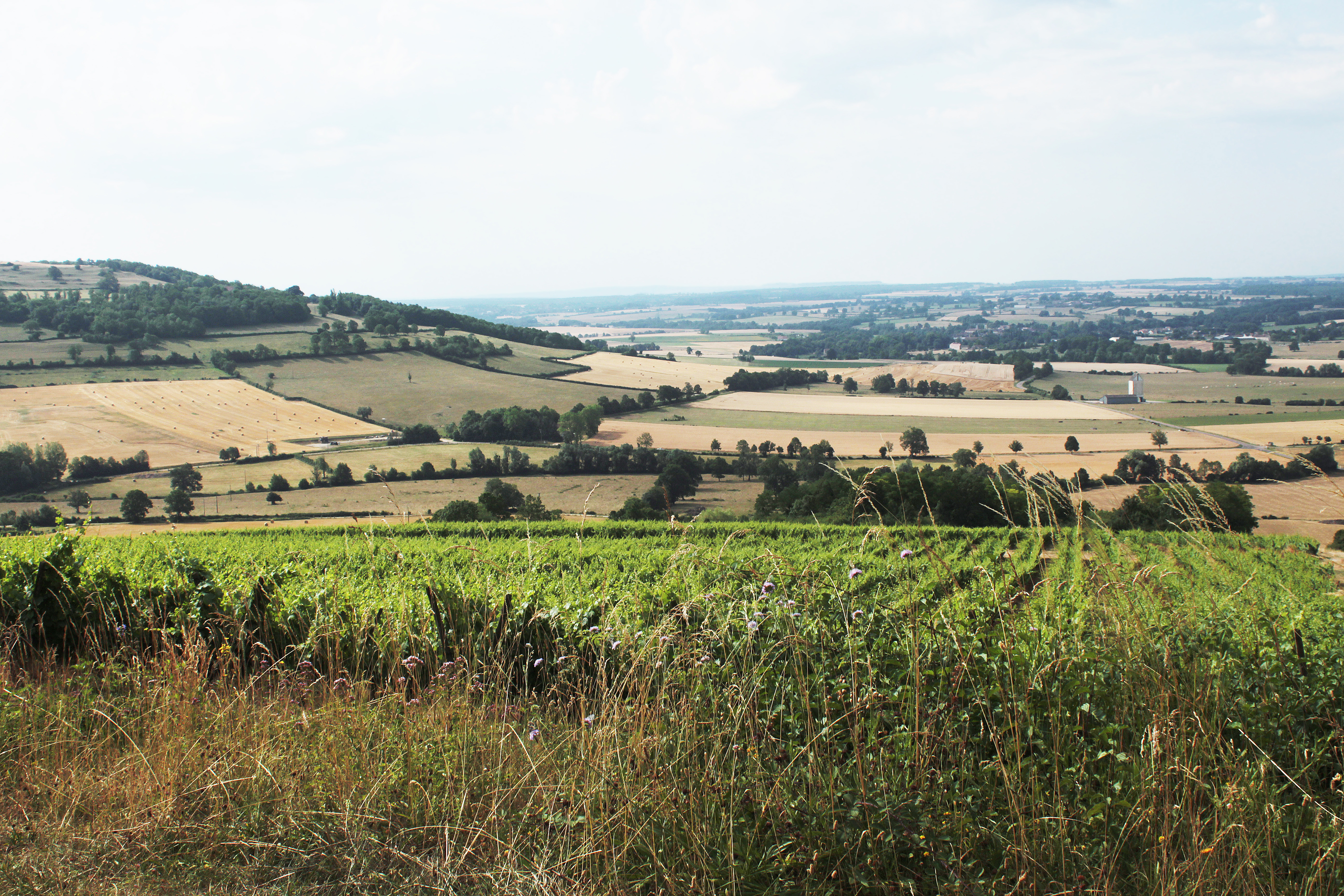
- The Viserny vineyards
- Location of Villaines-les-Prévôtes
- Location within France Location within Bourgogne-Franche-Comté
- Coordinates: 47°33′18″N 4°18′26″E
- Country: France
- Region: Bourgogne-Franche-Comté
- Department: Côte-d'Or
- Arrondissement: Montbard
- Canton: Montbard

Government
  - Mayor (2020–2026): Danièle Ayad
- Area^{1}: 10.78 km^{2} (4.16 sq mi)
- Elevation: 240 m (790 ft)
- Highest elevation: 434 m (1,424 ft)
- Lowest elevation: 216 m (709 ft)
- Population (2023): 140
  - Density: 13/km^{2} (34/sq mi)
- Time zone: UTC+01:00 (CET)
  - Summer (DST): UTC+02:00 (CEST)
- INSEE/Postal code: 21686 /21500
- ^{1} French Land Register data, which excludes lakes, ponds, glaciers > 1 km^{2} (0.386 sq mi or 247 acres) and river estuaries.

Villaines-les-Prévôtes (French pronunciation: [vilɛn le pʁevot]) is a commune in the Côte-d'Or department in eastern France.

== Population ==
Historical population
Year	Pop.	±% p.a.
1968	140	—
1975	122	−1.95%
1982	108	−1.73%
1990	125	+1.84%
1999	121	−0.36%
2007	134	+1.28%
2012	139	+0.74%
2017	141	+0.29%
2023	140	−0.12%
Source: INSEE

== See also ==
- Communes of the Côte-d'Or department
