= Lucenay-le-Duc =

- Commune
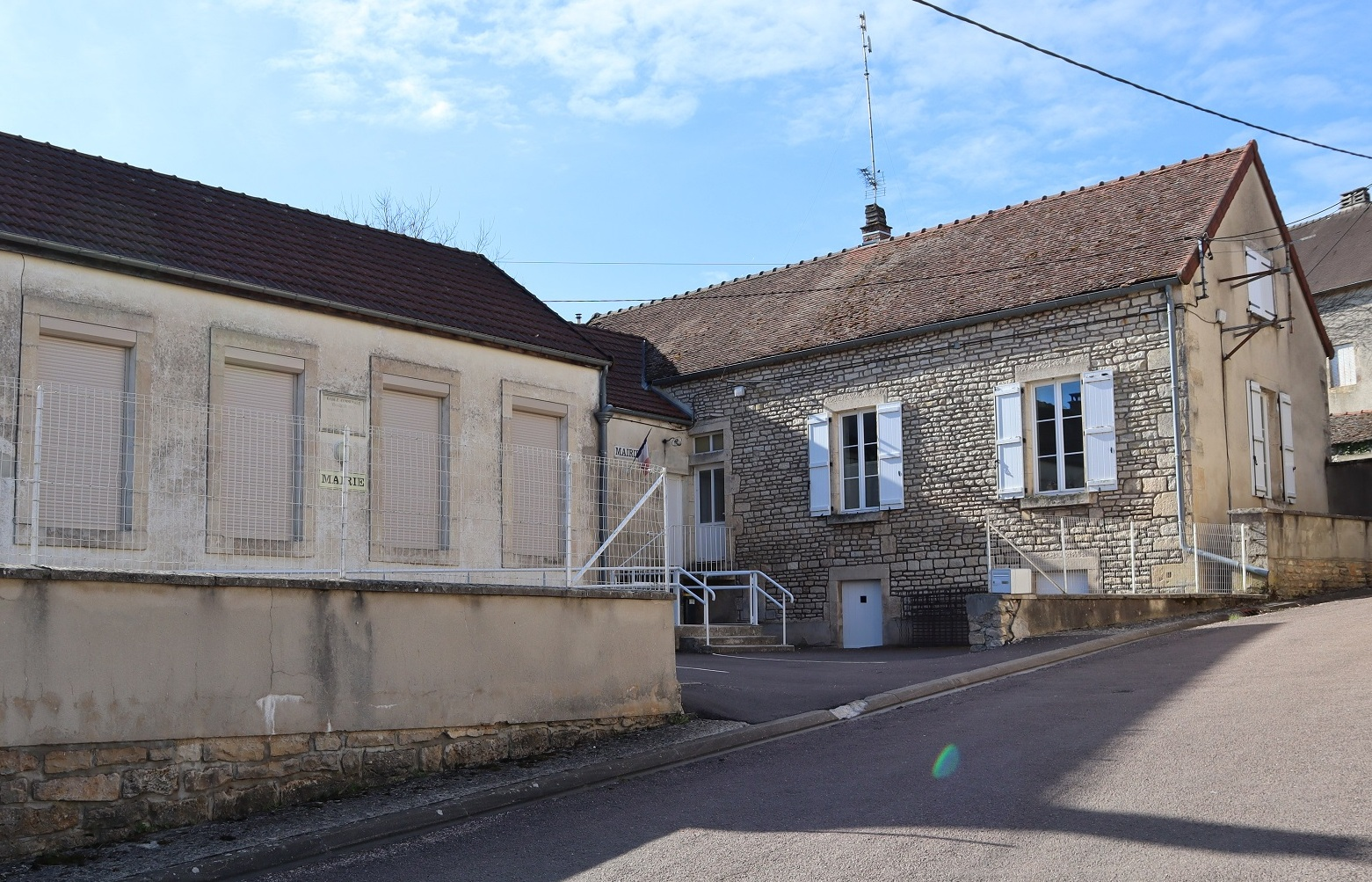
- Lucenay-le-Duc Town hall
- Location of Lucenay-le-Duc
- Location within France Location within Bourgogne-Franche-Comté
- Coordinates: 47°36′44″N 4°31′03″E
- Country: France
- Region: Bourgogne-Franche-Comté
- Department: Côte-d'Or
- Arrondissement: Montbard
- Canton: Montbard
- Intercommunality: CC du Montbardois

Government
  - Mayor (2020–2026): Luc Laure
- Area^{1}: 28.81 km^{2} (11.12 sq mi)
- Elevation: 415 m (1,362 ft)
- Highest elevation: 432 m (1,417 ft)
- Lowest elevation: 339 m (1,112 ft)
- Population (2023): 196
  - Density: 6.80/km^{2} (17.6/sq mi)
- Time zone: UTC+01:00 (CET)
  - Summer (DST): UTC+02:00 (CEST)
- INSEE/Postal code: 21358 /21150
- ^{1} French Land Register data, which excludes lakes, ponds, glaciers > 1 km^{2} (0.386 sq mi or 247 acres) and river estuaries.

Lucenay-le-Duc (French pronunciation: [lysnɛ l(ə) dyk]; lit. 'Lucenay-the-Duke') is a rural commune in the Côte-d'Or department in central-east France.

== Population ==
Historical population
Year	Pop.	±% p.a.
1968	242	—
1975	208	−2.14%
1982	200	−0.56%
1990	209	+0.55%
1999	206	−0.16%
2007	209	+0.18%
2012	207	−0.19%
2017	187	−2.01%
2023	196	+0.79%
Source: INSEE

== See also ==
- Communes of the Côte-d'Or department
