= Fontaines-les-Sèches =

- Commune
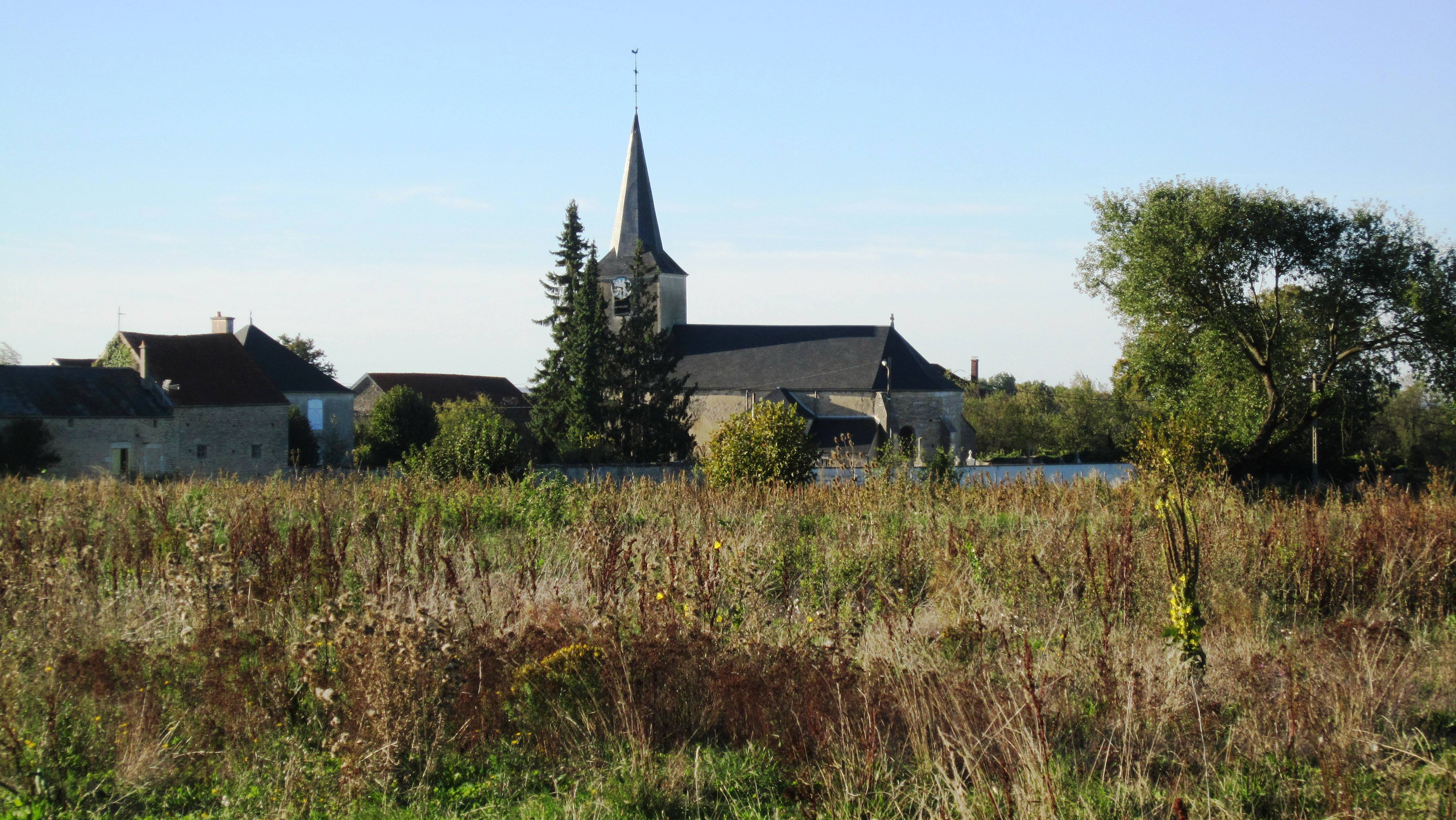
- The church and surroundings, Fontaines-les-Sèches
- Location of Fontaines-les-Sèches
- Location within France Location within Bourgogne-Franche-Comté
- Coordinates: 47°46′47″N 4°21′14″E
- Country: France
- Region: Bourgogne-Franche-Comté
- Department: Côte-d'Or
- Arrondissement: Montbard
- Canton: Montbard
- Intercommunality: Montbardois

Government
  - Mayor (2020–2026): Hubert Montenot
- Area^{1}: 13.52 km^{2} (5.22 sq mi)
- Elevation: 276 m (906 ft)
- Highest elevation: 292 m (958 ft)
- Lowest elevation: 232 m (761 ft)
- Population (2023): 26
  - Density: 1.9/km^{2} (5.0/sq mi)
- Time zone: UTC+01:00 (CET)
  - Summer (DST): UTC+02:00 (CEST)
- INSEE/Postal code: 21279 /21330
- ^{1} French Land Register data, which excludes lakes, ponds, glaciers > 1 km^{2} (0.386 sq mi or 247 acres) and river estuaries.

Fontaines-les-Sèches (French pronunciation: [fɔ̃tɛn le sɛʃ]) is a commune in the Côte-d'Or department and Bourgogne-Franche-Comté region of eastern France.

== Population ==
Historical population
Year	Pop.	±% p.a.
1968	82	—
1975	87	+0.85%
1982	59	−5.40%
1990	47	−2.80%
1999	50	+0.69%
2007	41	−2.45%
2012	32	−4.84%
2017	26	−4.07%
2023	26	+0.00%
Source: INSEE

== See also ==
- Communes of the Côte-d'Or department
