= Planay, Côte-d'Or =

Planay
- Commune
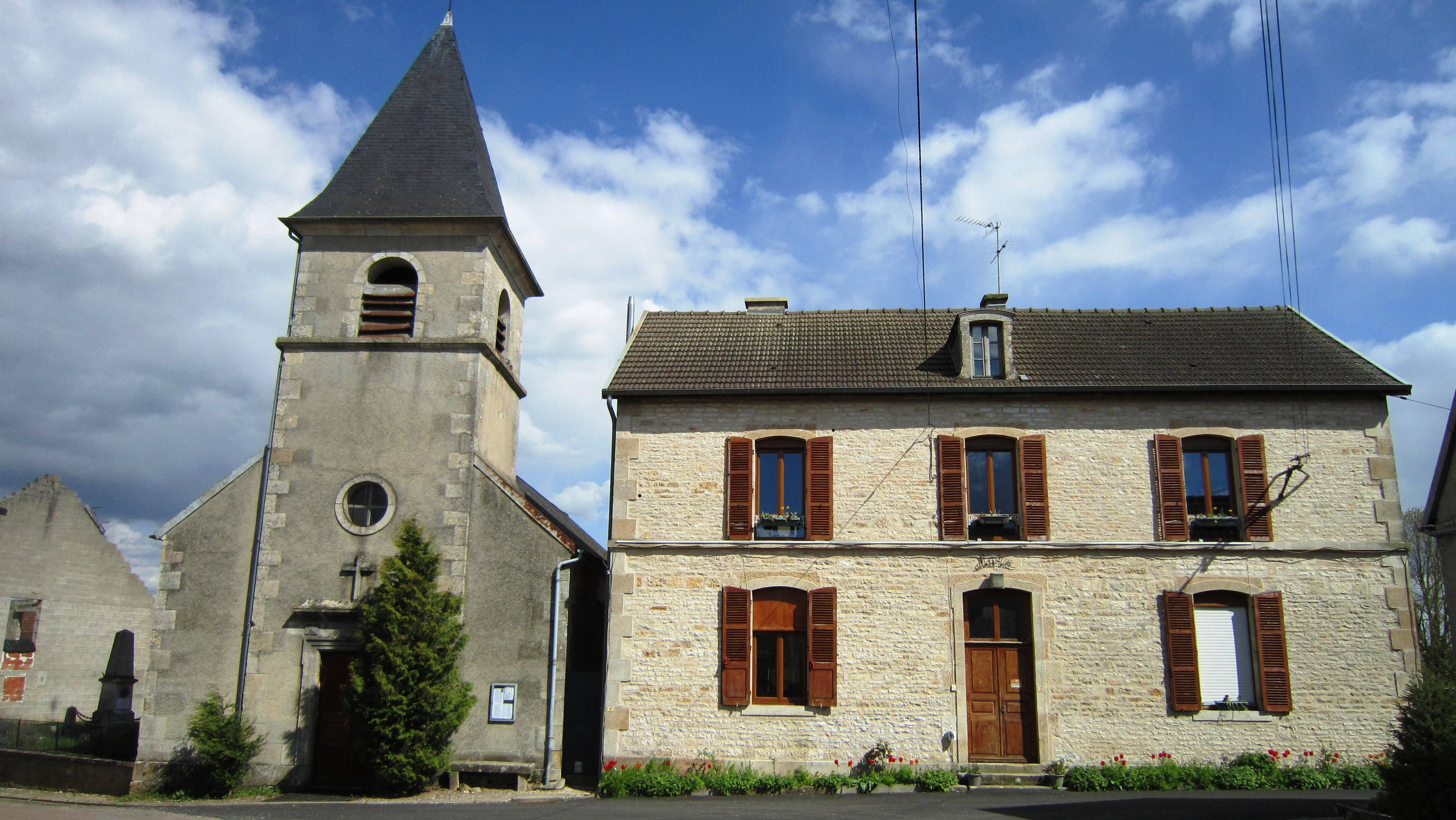
- The church and town hall in Planay
- Location of Planay
- Location within France Location within Bourgogne-Franche-Comté
- Coordinates: 47°44′45″N 4°22′46″E
- Country: France
- Region: Bourgogne-Franche-Comté
- Department: Côte-d'Or
- Arrondissement: Montbard
- Canton: Montbard

Government
  - Mayor (2020–2026): Dominique Bouisson
- Area^{1}: 8.72 km^{2} (3.37 sq mi)
- Elevation: 326 m (1,070 ft)
- Highest elevation: 336 m (1,102 ft)
- Lowest elevation: 272 m (892 ft)
- Population (2023): 61
  - Density: 7.0/km^{2} (18/sq mi)
- Time zone: UTC+01:00 (CET)
  - Summer (DST): UTC+02:00 (CEST)
- INSEE/Postal code: 21484 /21500
- ^{1} French Land Register data, which excludes lakes, ponds, glaciers > 1 km^{2} (0.386 sq mi or 247 acres) and river estuaries.

Planay (French pronunciation: [planɛ]) is a commune in the Côte-d'Or department in eastern France.

== Population ==
Historical population
Year	Pop.	±% p.a.
1968	99	—
1975	88	−1.67%
1982	81	−1.18%
1990	63	−3.09%
1999	77	+2.25%
2007	81	+0.64%
2012	81	+0.00%
2017	67	−3.72%
2023	61	−1.55%
Source: INSEE

== See also ==
- Communes of the Côte-d'Or department
