= Quincerot, Côte-d'Or =

Quincerot
- Commune
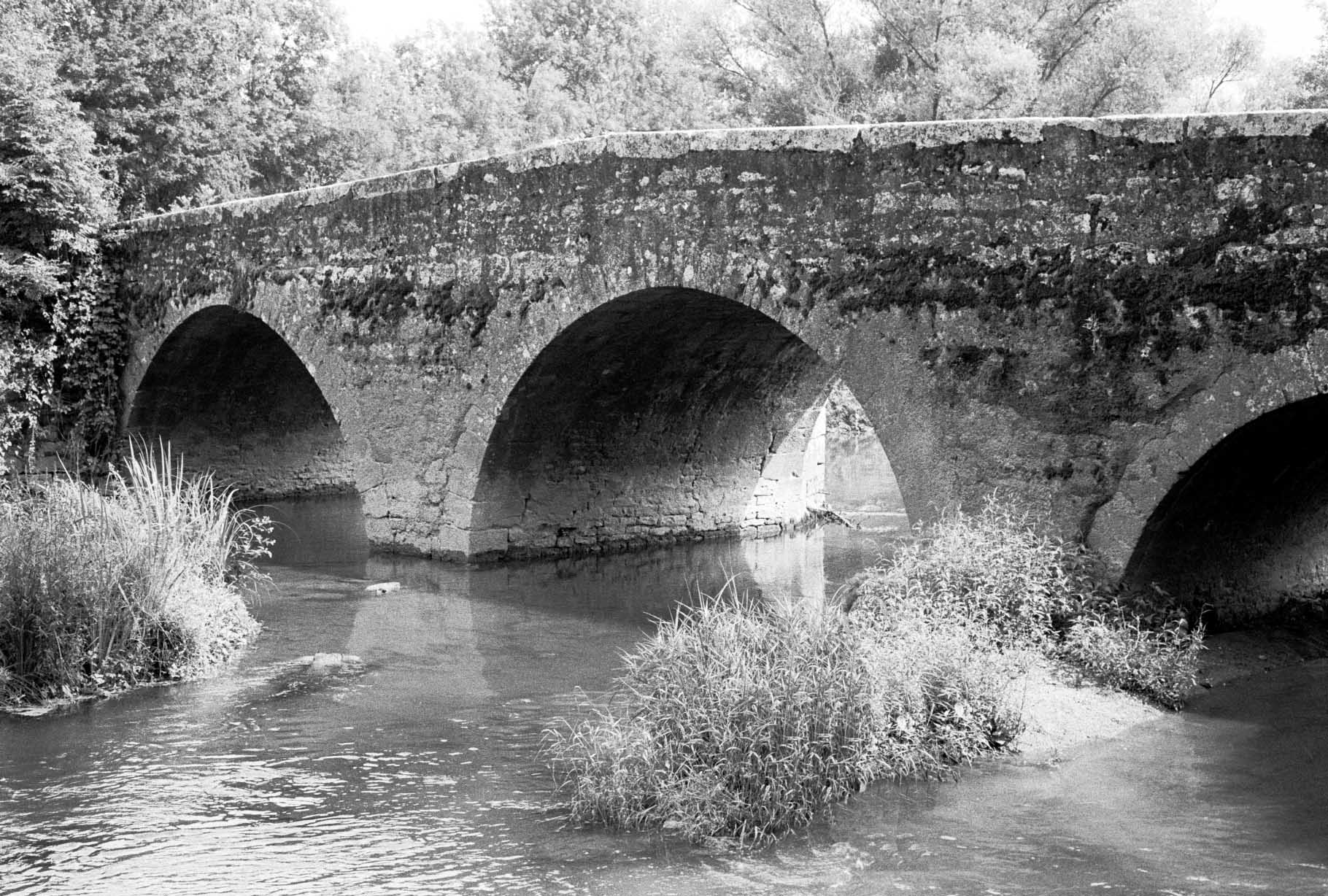
- The Roman Bridge in Quincerot
- Location of Quincerot
- Location within France Location within Bourgogne-Franche-Comté
- Coordinates: 47°36′44″N 4°16′02″E
- Country: France
- Region: Bourgogne-Franche-Comté
- Department: Côte-d'Or
- Arrondissement: Montbard
- Canton: Montbard

Government
  - Mayor (2020–2026): Pascal Perrichet-Pechinez
- Area^{1}: 4.42 km^{2} (1.71 sq mi)
- Elevation: 235 m (771 ft)
- Highest elevation: 380 m (1,250 ft)
- Lowest elevation: 202 m (663 ft)
- Population (2023): 77
  - Density: 17/km^{2} (45/sq mi)
- Time zone: UTC+01:00 (CET)
  - Summer (DST): UTC+02:00 (CEST)
- INSEE/Postal code: 21516 /21500
- ^{1} French Land Register data, which excludes lakes, ponds, glaciers > 1 km^{2} (0.386 sq mi or 247 acres) and river estuaries.

Quincerot (French pronunciation: [kɛ̃sʁo]) is a commune in the Côte-d'Or department in eastern France.

== Population ==
Historical population
Year	Pop.	±% p.a.
1968	64	—
1975	53	−2.66%
1982	50	−0.83%
1990	57	+1.65%
1999	53	−0.81%
2007	96	+7.71%
2012	87	−1.95%
2017	76	−2.67%
2023	77	+0.22%
Source: INSEE

== See also ==
- Communes of the Côte-d'Or department
