= Senailly =

- Commune
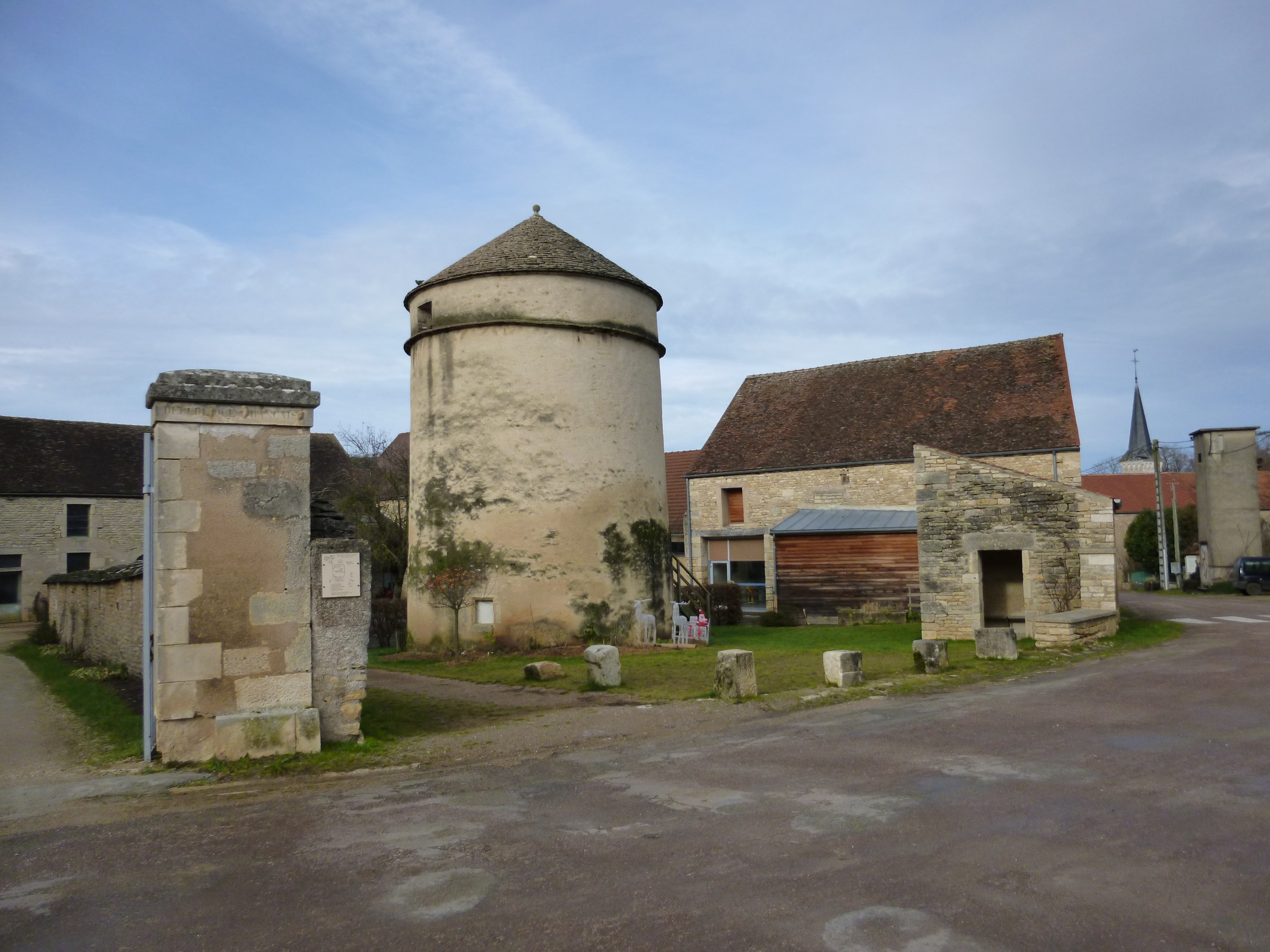
- The dovecote and surroundings in Senailly
- Location of Senailly
- Location within France Location within Bourgogne-Franche-Comté
- Coordinates: 47°35′06″N 4°16′02″E
- Country: France
- Region: Bourgogne-Franche-Comté
- Department: Côte-d'Or
- Arrondissement: Montbard
- Canton: Montbard

Government
  - Mayor (2020–2026): Philippe Lucotte
- Area^{1}: 9.28 km^{2} (3.58 sq mi)
- Elevation: 240 m (790 ft)
- Highest elevation: 424 m (1,391 ft)
- Lowest elevation: 209 m (686 ft)
- Population (2023): 132
  - Density: 14.2/km^{2} (36.8/sq mi)
- Demonym(s): Senaillais, Senaillaise
- Time zone: UTC+01:00 (CET)
  - Summer (DST): UTC+02:00 (CEST)
- INSEE/Postal code: 21604 /21500
- ^{1} French Land Register data, which excludes lakes, ponds, glaciers > 1 km^{2} (0.386 sq mi or 247 acres) and river estuaries.

Senailly (French pronunciation: [sənaji]) is a commune in the French department of Côte-d'Or, and the region of Bourgogne-Franche-Comté, eastern France.

== Population ==
Historical population
Year	Pop.	±% p.a.
1968	134	—
1975	129	−0.54%
1982	154	+2.56%
1990	157	+0.24%
1999	151	−0.43%
2007	138	−1.12%
2012	150	+1.68%
2017	139	−1.51%
2023	132	−0.86%
Source: INSEE

== See also ==
- Communes of the Côte-d'Or department
