= Charencey, Côte-d'Or =

Charencey
- Commune
- Location of Charencey
- Location within France Location within Bourgogne-Franche-Comté
- Coordinates: 47°25′22″N 4°40′21″E
- Country: France
- Region: Bourgogne-Franche-Comté
- Department: Côte-d'Or
- Arrondissement: Montbard
- Canton: Montbard

Government
  - Mayor (2020–2026): Jean-Claude Millot
- Area^{1}: 4.84 km^{2} (1.87 sq mi)
- Elevation: 450 m (1,480 ft)
- Highest elevation: 517 m (1,696 ft)
- Lowest elevation: 334 m (1,096 ft)
- Population (2023): 35
  - Density: 7.2/km^{2} (19/sq mi)
- Time zone: UTC+01:00 (CET)
  - Summer (DST): UTC+02:00 (CEST)
- INSEE/Postal code: 21144 /21690
- ^{1} French Land Register data, which excludes lakes, ponds, glaciers > 1 km^{2} (0.386 sq mi or 247 acres) and river estuaries.

Charencey (French pronunciation: [ʃaʁɑ̃sɛ]) is a commune in the Côte-d'Or department in eastern France.

== Population ==
Historical population
| Year | Pop. | ±% p.a. |
|---|---|---|
| 1968 | 61 | — |
| 1975 | 38 | −6.54% |
| 1982 | 35 | −1.17% |
| 1990 | 28 | −2.75% |
| 1999 | 32 | +1.49% |
| 2007 | 29 | −1.22% |
| 2012 | 28 | −0.70% |
| 2017 | 33 | +3.34% |
| 2023 | 35 | +0.99% |
Source: INSEE

== See also ==
- Communes of the Côte-d'Or department
