= Semond =

- Commune
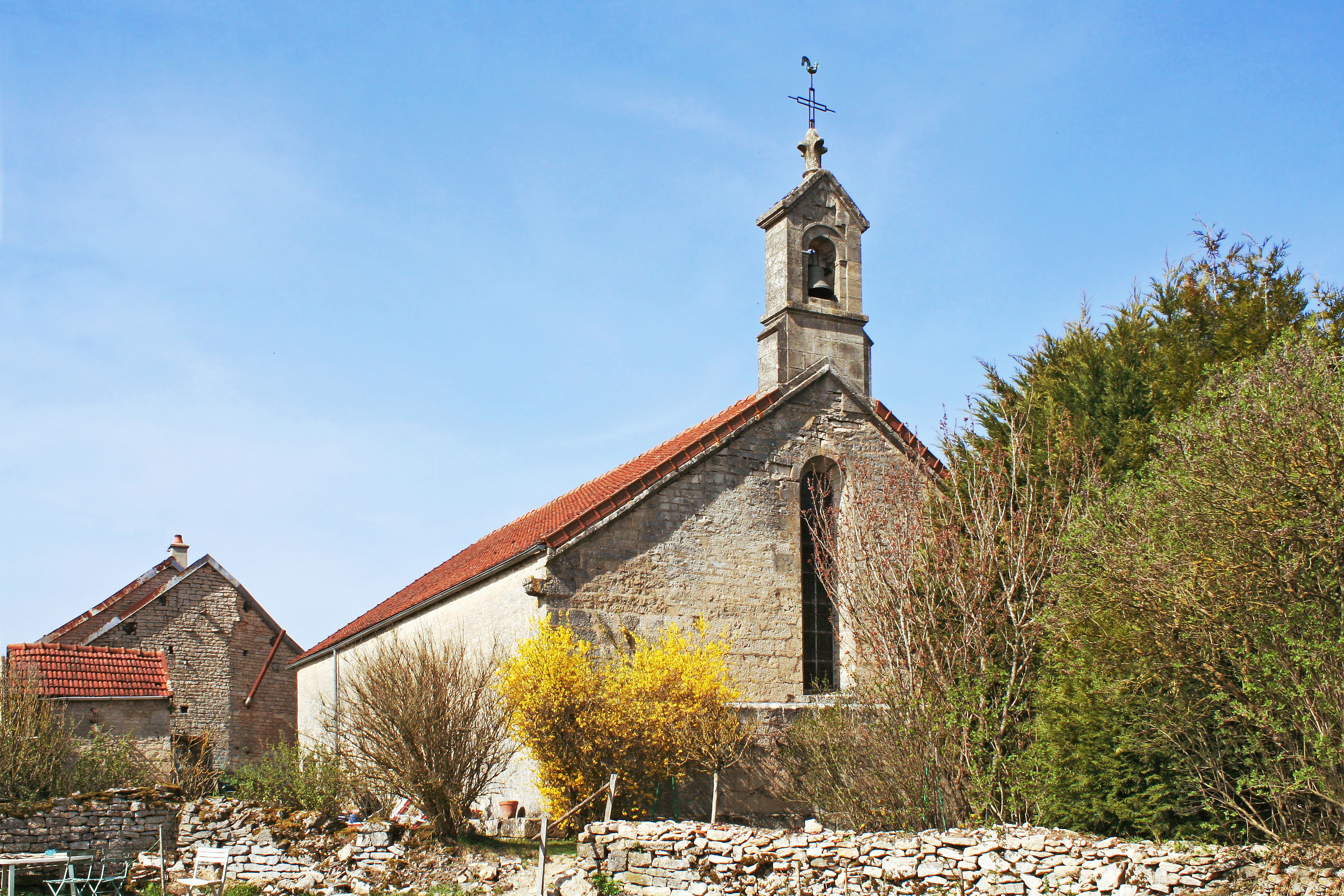
- The church in Semond
- Location of Semond
- Location within France Location within Bourgogne-Franche-Comté
- Coordinates: 47°43′09″N 4°35′35″E
- Country: France
- Region: Bourgogne-Franche-Comté
- Department: Côte-d'Or
- Arrondissement: Montbard
- Canton: Châtillon-sur-Seine
- Intercommunality: Pays Châtillonnais

Government
  - Mayor (2020–2026): Florence Bouchard
- Area^{1}: 5.97 km^{2} (2.31 sq mi)
- Elevation: 335 m (1,099 ft)
- Highest elevation: 404 m (1,325 ft)
- Lowest elevation: 285 m (935 ft)
- Population (2023): 32
  - Density: 5.4/km^{2} (14/sq mi)
- Time zone: UTC+01:00 (CET)
  - Summer (DST): UTC+02:00 (CEST)
- INSEE/Postal code: 21602 /21450
- ^{1} French Land Register data, which excludes lakes, ponds, glaciers > 1 km^{2} (0.386 sq mi or 247 acres) and river estuaries.

Semond (French pronunciation: [səmɔ̃]) is a commune in the Côte-d'Or department in eastern France.

== Population ==
Historical population
Year	Pop.	±% p.a.
1968	74	—
1975	74	+0.00%
1982	55	−4.15%
1990	64	+1.91%
1999	45	−3.84%
2007	29	−5.34%
2012	34	+3.23%
2017	23	−7.52%
2023	32	+5.66%
Source: INSEE

== See also ==
- Communes of the Côte-d'Or department
