= Vanvey =

- Commune
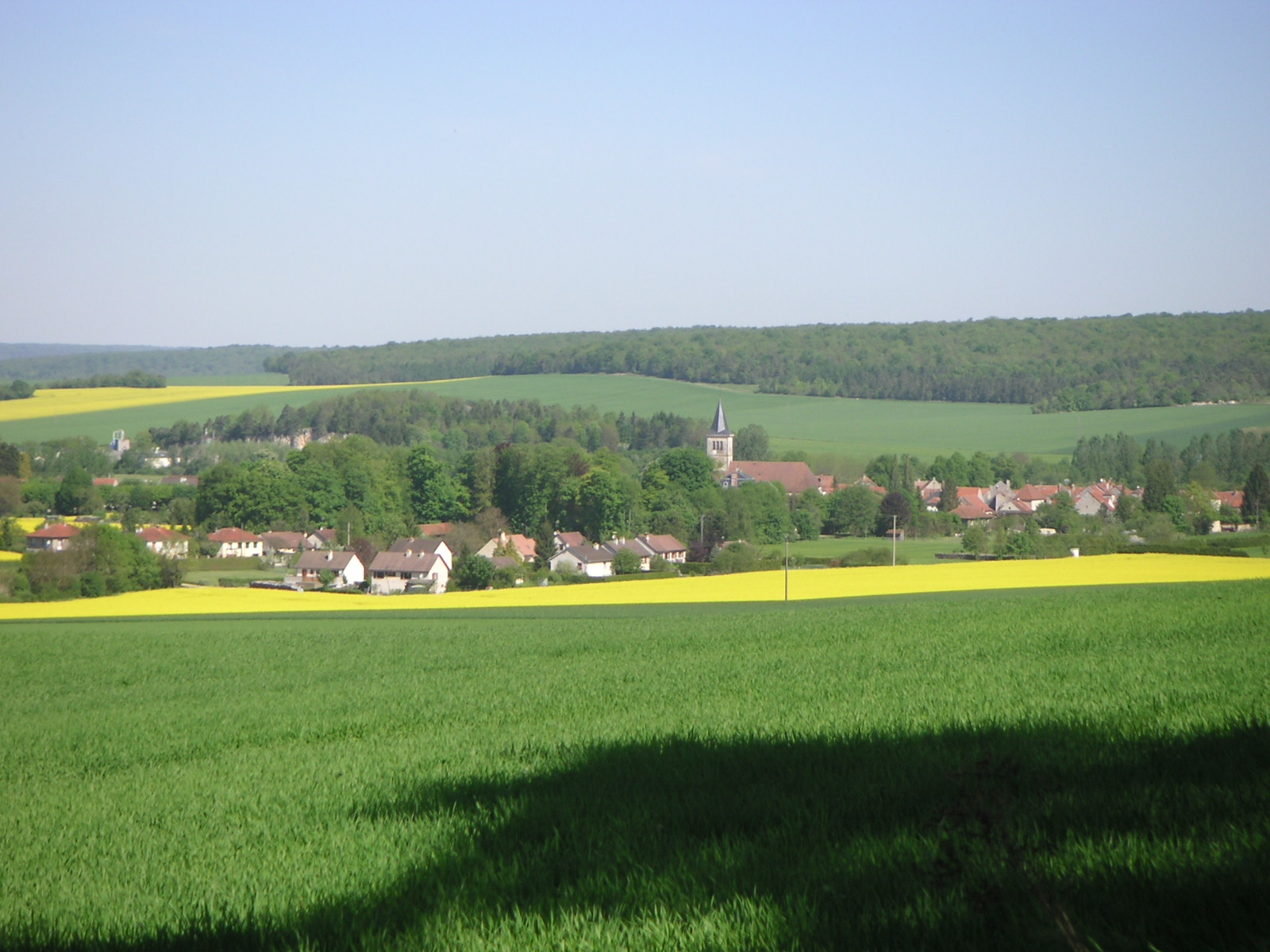
- A general view of Vanvey

- Coat of arms
- Location of Vanvey
- Location within France Location within Bourgogne-Franche-Comté
- Coordinates: 47°50′06″N 4°42′34″E
- Country: France
- Region: Bourgogne-Franche-Comté
- Department: Côte-d'Or
- Arrondissement: Montbard
- Canton: Châtillon-sur-Seine
- Intercommunality: Pays Châtillonnais

Government
  - Mayor (2020–2026): Philippe Vincent
- Area^{1}: 16.8 km^{2} (6.5 sq mi)
- Elevation: 248 m (814 ft)
- Highest elevation: 376 m (1,234 ft)
- Lowest elevation: 242 m (794 ft)
- Population (2023): 243
  - Density: 14.5/km^{2} (37.5/sq mi)
- Time zone: UTC+01:00 (CET)
  - Summer (DST): UTC+02:00 (CEST)
- INSEE/Postal code: 21655 /21400
- ^{1} French Land Register data, which excludes lakes, ponds, glaciers > 1 km^{2} (0.386 sq mi or 247 acres) and river estuaries.

Vanvey (French pronunciation: [vɑ̃vɛ]) is a commune in the Côte-d'Or department in eastern France.

== Population ==
Historical population
Year	Pop.	±% p.a.
1968	563	—
1975	412	−4.36%
1982	332	−3.04%
1990	356	+0.88%
1999	313	−1.42%
2007	271	−1.78%
2012	219	−4.17%
2017	233	+1.25%
2023	243	+0.70%
Source: INSEE

== See also ==
- Communes of the Côte-d'Or department
