= Bellenod-sur-Seine =

- Commune
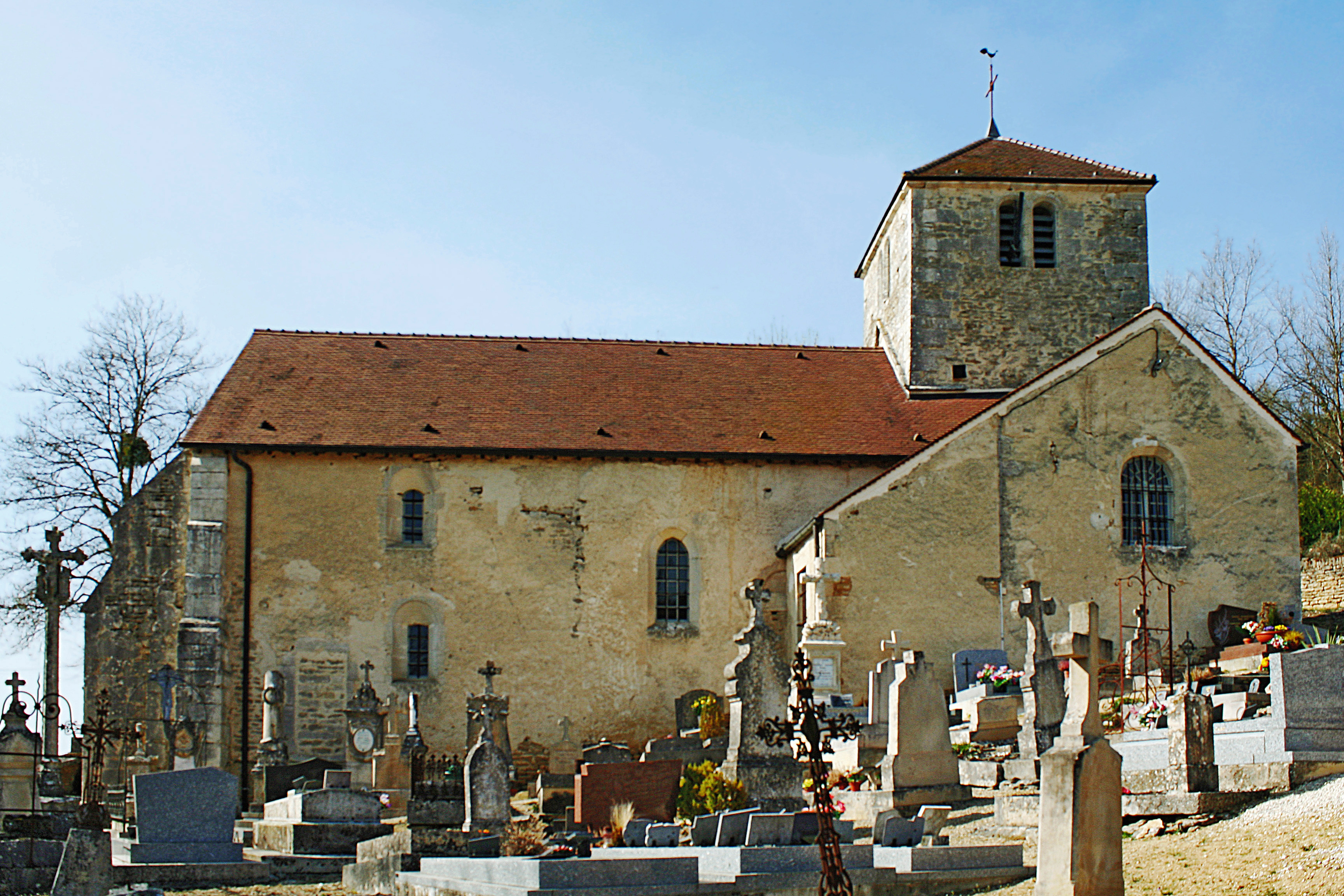
- The church in Bellenod-sur-Seine

- Coat of arms
- Location of Bellenod-sur-Seine
- Location within France Location within Bourgogne-Franche-Comté
- Coordinates: 47°41′55″N 4°38′48″E
- Country: France
- Region: Bourgogne-Franche-Comté
- Department: Côte-d'Or
- Arrondissement: Montbard
- Canton: Châtillon-sur-Seine
- Intercommunality: Pays Châtillonnais

Government
  - Mayor (2020–2026): Valérie Bouchard
- Area^{1}: 14.59 km^{2} (5.63 sq mi)
- Elevation: 410 m (1,350 ft)
- Highest elevation: 414 m (1,358 ft)
- Lowest elevation: 272 m (892 ft)
- Population (2023): 64
  - Density: 4.4/km^{2} (11/sq mi)
- Time zone: UTC+01:00 (CET)
  - Summer (DST): UTC+02:00 (CEST)
- INSEE/Postal code: 21061 /21510
- ^{1} French Land Register data, which excludes lakes, ponds, glaciers > 1 km^{2} (0.386 sq mi or 247 acres) and river estuaries.

Bellenod-sur-Seine (French pronunciation: [bɛlno syʁ sɛn], literally Bellenod on Seine) is a commune in the Côte-d'Or department in eastern France.

== Population ==
Historical population
Year	Pop.	±% p.a.
1968	128	—
1975	109	−2.27%
1982	115	+0.77%
1990	90	−3.02%
1999	78	−1.58%
2007	78	+0.00%
2012	77	−0.26%
2017	76	−0.26%
2023	64	−2.82%
Source: INSEE

== See also ==
- Communes of the Côte-d'Or department
