= Bissey-la-Pierre =

- Commune
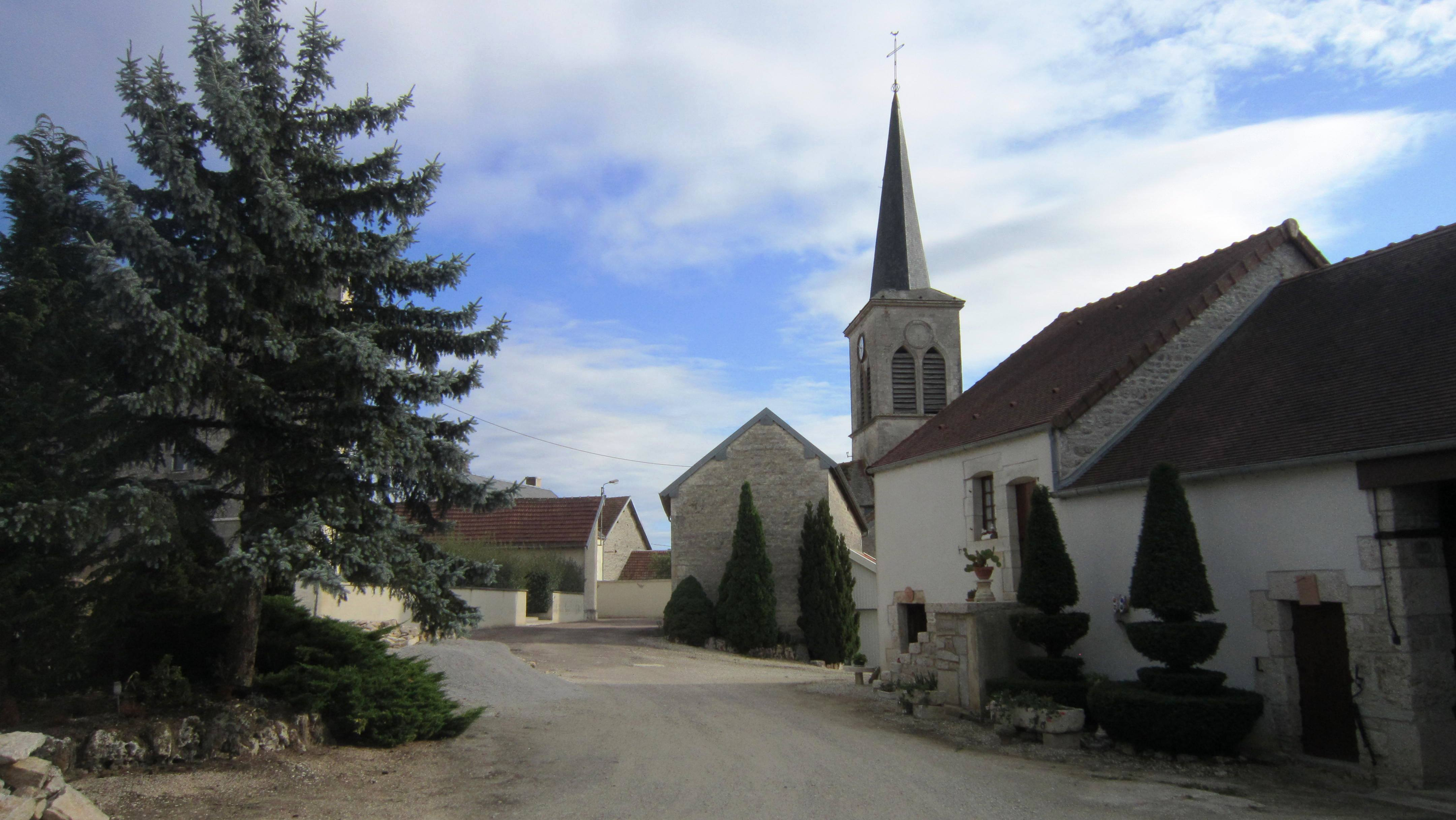
- The church and surroundings in Bissey-la-Pierre

- Coat of arms
- Location of Bissey-la-Pierre
- Location within France Location within Bourgogne-Franche-Comté
- Coordinates: 47°50′58″N 4°25′35″E
- Country: France
- Region: Bourgogne-Franche-Comté
- Department: Côte-d'Or
- Arrondissement: Montbard
- Canton: Châtillon-sur-Seine

Government
  - Mayor (2020–2026): Emmanuel Dewaele
- Area^{1}: 8.44 km^{2} (3.26 sq mi)
- Elevation: 240 m (790 ft)
- Highest elevation: 261 m (856 ft)
- Lowest elevation: 214 m (702 ft)
- Population (2023): 67
  - Density: 7.9/km^{2} (21/sq mi)
- Time zone: UTC+01:00 (CET)
  - Summer (DST): UTC+02:00 (CEST)
- INSEE/Postal code: 21078 /21330
- ^{1} French Land Register data, which excludes lakes, ponds, glaciers > 1 km^{2} (0.386 sq mi or 247 acres) and river estuaries.

Bissey-la-Pierre (French pronunciation: [bisɛ la pjɛʁ]) is a commune in the Côte-d'Or department in eastern France.

== Population ==
Historical population
Year	Pop.	±% p.a.
1968	83	—
1975	71	−2.21%
1982	59	−2.61%
1990	54	−1.10%
1999	86	+5.31%
2007	80	−0.90%
2012	72	−2.09%
2017	74	+0.55%
2023	67	−1.64%
Source: INSEE

== See also ==
- Communes of the Côte-d'Or department
