= Thoires =

- Commune
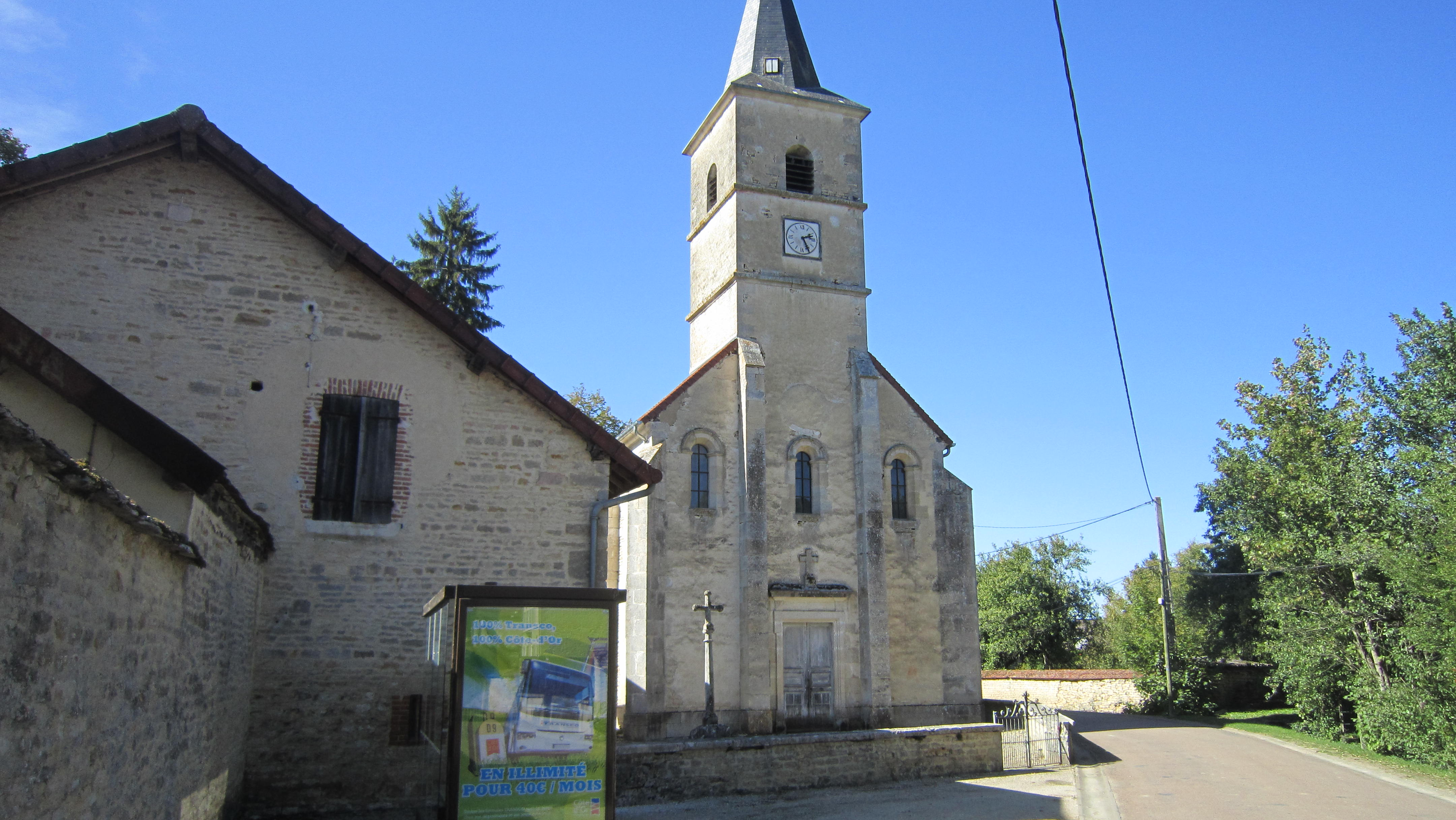
- The church in Thoires

- Coat of arms
- Location of Thoires
- Location within France Location within Bourgogne-Franche-Comté
- Coordinates: 47°56′08″N 4°40′35″E
- Country: France
- Region: Bourgogne-Franche-Comté
- Department: Côte-d'Or
- Arrondissement: Montbard
- Canton: Châtillon-sur-Seine
- Intercommunality: Pays Châtillonnais

Government
  - Mayor (2020–2026): Hubert Mignard
- Area^{1}: 10.22 km^{2} (3.95 sq mi)
- Elevation: 230 m (750 ft)
- Highest elevation: 318 m (1,043 ft)
- Lowest elevation: 212 m (696 ft)
- Population (2023): 55
  - Density: 5.4/km^{2} (14/sq mi)
- Time zone: UTC+01:00 (CET)
  - Summer (DST): UTC+02:00 (CEST)
- INSEE/Postal code: 21628 /21570
- ^{1} French Land Register data, which excludes lakes, ponds, glaciers > 1 km^{2} (0.386 sq mi or 247 acres) and river estuaries.

Thoires (French pronunciation: [twaʁ]) is a commune in the Côte-d'Or department in eastern France.

== Population ==
Historical population
Year	Pop.	±% p.a.
1968	58	—
1975	65	+1.64%
1982	65	+0.00%
1990	58	−1.41%
1999	85	+4.34%
2007	81	−0.60%
2012	67	−3.72%
2017	64	−0.91%
2023	55	−2.49%
Source: INSEE

== See also ==
- Communes of the Côte-d'Or department
