= Chambain =

- Commune
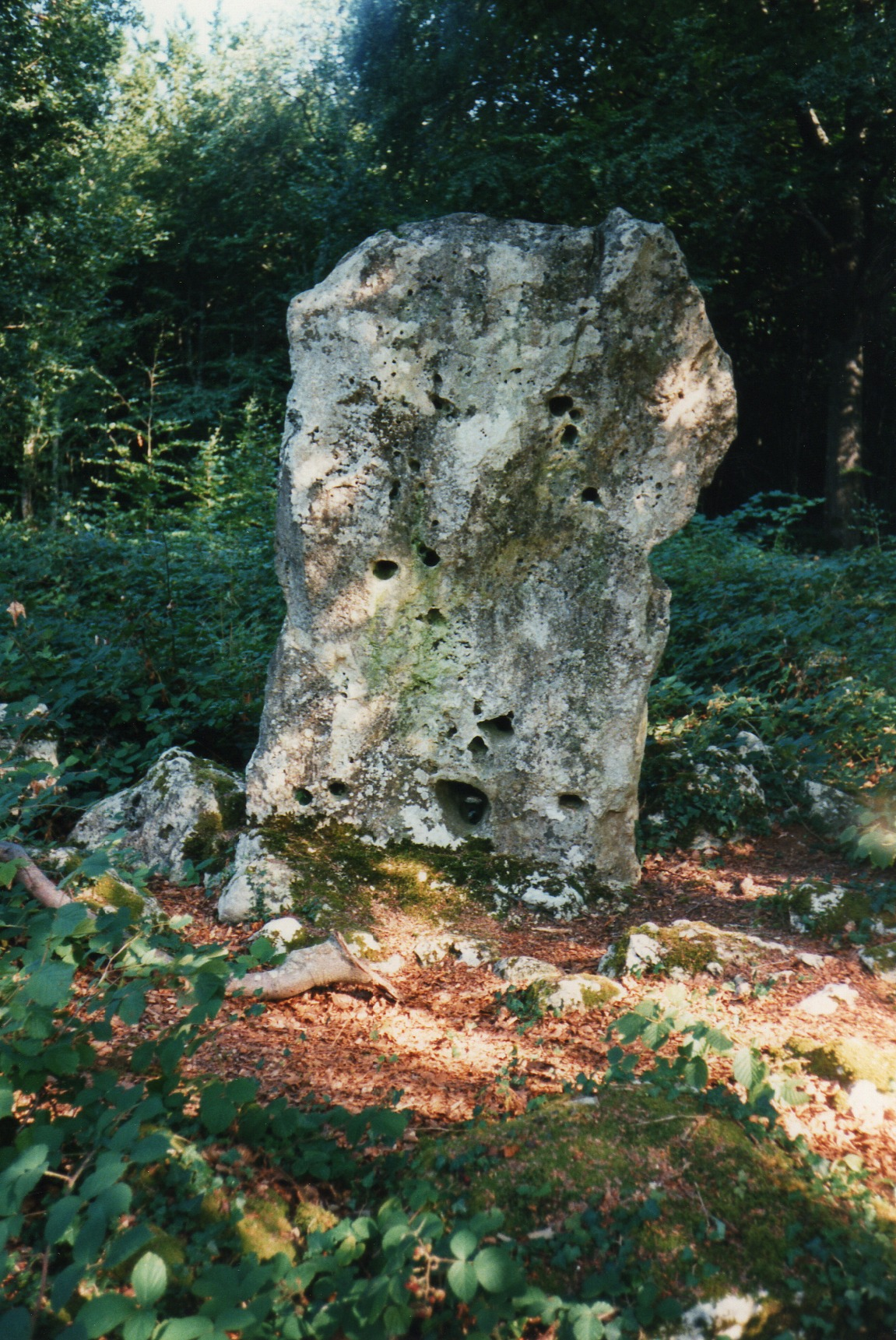
- Grey Horse menhir
- Location of Chambain
- Location within France Location within Bourgogne-Franche-Comté
- Coordinates: 47°47′54″N 4°55′18″E
- Country: France
- Region: Bourgogne-Franche-Comté
- Department: Côte-d'Or
- Arrondissement: Montbard
- Canton: Châtillon-sur-Seine
- Intercommunality: Pays Châtillonnais

Government
  - Mayor (2020–2026): Franck Moilleron
- Area^{1}: 9.75 km^{2} (3.76 sq mi)
- Elevation: 435 m (1,427 ft)
- Highest elevation: 449 m (1,473 ft)
- Lowest elevation: 354 m (1,161 ft)
- Population (2023): 36
  - Density: 3.7/km^{2} (9.6/sq mi)
- Time zone: UTC+01:00 (CET)
  - Summer (DST): UTC+02:00 (CEST)
- INSEE/Postal code: 21129 /21290
- ^{1} French Land Register data, which excludes lakes, ponds, glaciers > 1 km^{2} (0.386 sq mi or 247 acres) and river estuaries.

Chambain (French pronunciation: [ʃɑ̃bɛ̃]) is a commune in the Côte-d'Or department in eastern France.

== Population ==
Historical population
| Year | Pop. | ±% p.a. |
|---|---|---|
| 1968 | 47 | — |
| 1975 | 46 | −0.31% |
| 1982 | 49 | +0.91% |
| 1990 | 36 | −3.78% |
| 1999 | 39 | +0.89% |
| 2007 | 31 | −2.83% |
| 2012 | 37 | +3.60% |
| 2017 | 27 | −6.11% |
| 2023 | 36 | +4.91% |
Source: INSEE

== See also ==
- Communes of the Côte-d'Or department
