= Riel-les-Eaux =

- Commune
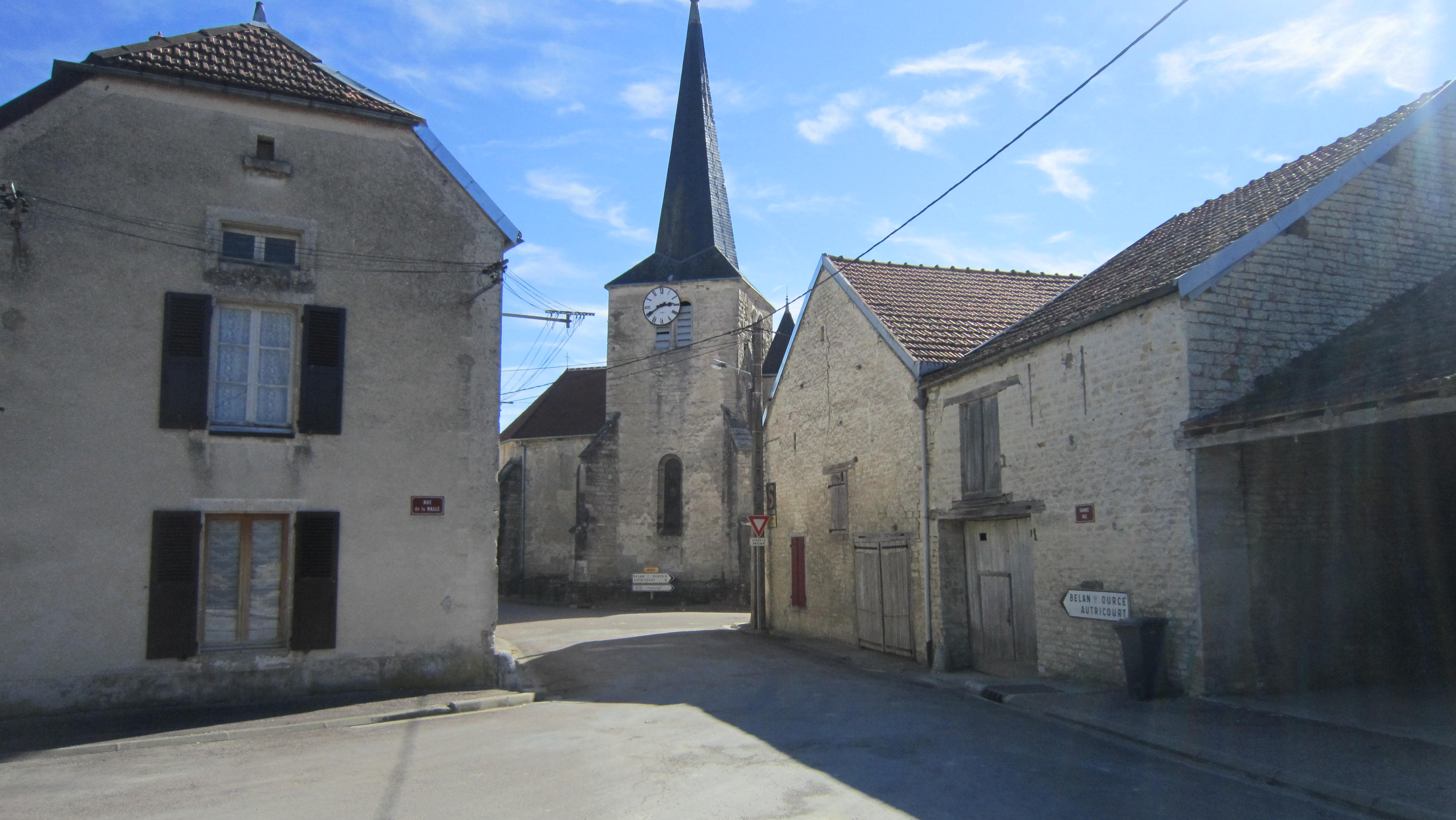
- Church of the village
- Location of Riel-les-Eaux
- Location within France Location within Bourgogne-Franche-Comté
- Coordinates: 47°58′33″N 4°40′31″E
- Country: France
- Region: Bourgogne-Franche-Comté
- Department: Côte-d'Or
- Arrondissement: Montbard
- Canton: Châtillon-sur-Seine
- Intercommunality: Pays Châtillonnais

Government
  - Mayor (2020–2026): Marc Stivalet
- Area^{1}: 25.77 km^{2} (9.95 sq mi)
- Elevation: 220 m (720 ft)
- Highest elevation: 334 m (1,096 ft)
- Lowest elevation: 202 m (663 ft)
- Population (2023): 93
  - Density: 3.6/km^{2} (9.3/sq mi)
- Time zone: UTC+01:00 (CET)
  - Summer (DST): UTC+02:00 (CEST)
- INSEE/Postal code: 21524 /21570
- ^{1} French Land Register data, which excludes lakes, ponds, glaciers > 1 km^{2} (0.386 sq mi or 247 acres) and river estuaries.

Riel-les-Eaux (French pronunciation: [ʁjɛl le.z‿o]) is a commune in the Côte-d'Or department in eastern France.

== Population ==
Historical population
Year	Pop.	±% p.a.
1968	117	—
1975	105	−1.53%
1982	106	+0.14%
1990	94	−1.49%
1999	96	+0.23%
2007	74	−3.20%
2012	79	+1.32%
2017	94	+3.54%
2023	93	−0.18%
Source: INSEE

== See also ==
- Communes of the Côte-d'Or department
