= Canton of Châtillon-sur-Seine =

Coordinates: 47.86°N 4.57°E

The canton of Châtillon-sur-Seine is an administrative division of the Côte-d'Or department, eastern France. Its borders were modified at the French canton reorganisation which came into effect in March 2015. Its seat is in Châtillon-sur-Seine.

It consists of the following communes:

1. Aignay-le-Duc
2. Aisey-sur-Seine
3. Ampilly-les-Bordes
4. Ampilly-le-Sec
5. Autricourt
6. Baigneux-les-Juifs
7. Balot
8. Beaulieu
9. Beaunotte
10. Belan-sur-Ource
11. Bellenod-sur-Seine
12. Beneuvre
13. Billy-lès-Chanceaux
14. Bissey-la-Côte
15. Bissey-la-Pierre
16. Boudreville
17. Bouix
18. Brémur-et-Vaurois
19. Brion-sur-Ource
20. Buncey
21. Bure-les-Templiers
22. Busseaut
23. Buxerolles
24. Cérilly
25. Chambain
26. Chamesson
27. Channay
28. Charrey-sur-Seine
29. Châtillon-sur-Seine
30. Chaugey
31. La Chaume
32. Chaume-lès-Baigneux
33. Chaumont-le-Bois
34. Chemin-d'Aisey
35. Coulmier-le-Sec
36. Courban
37. Duesme
38. Échalot
39. Essarois
40. Étalante
41. Étormay
42. Étrochey
43. Faverolles-lès-Lucey
44. Fontaines-en-Duesmois
45. Gevrolles
46. Gomméville
47. Les Goulles
48. Grancey-sur-Ource
49. Griselles
50. Gurgy-la-Ville
51. Gurgy-le-Château
52. Jours-lès-Baigneux
53. Laignes
54. Larrey
55. Leuglay
56. Lignerolles
57. Louesme
58. Lucey
59. Magny-Lambert
60. Maisey-le-Duc
61. Marcenay
62. Massingy
63. Mauvilly
64. Menesble
65. Meulson
66. Minot
67. Moitron
68. Molesme
69. Montigny-sur-Aube
70. Montliot-et-Courcelles
71. Montmoyen
72. Mosson
73. Nicey
74. Nod-sur-Seine
75. Noiron-sur-Seine
76. Obtrée
77. Oigny
78. Origny
79. Orret
80. Poinçon-lès-Larrey
81. Poiseul-la-Ville-et-Laperrière
82. Pothières
83. Prusly-sur-Ource
84. Puits
85. Quemigny-sur-Seine
86. Recey-sur-Ource
87. Riel-les-Eaux
88. Rochefort-sur-Brévon
89. Saint-Broing-les-Moines
90. Sainte-Colombe-sur-Seine
91. Saint-Germain-le-Rocheux
92. Saint-Marc-sur-Seine
93. Savoisy
94. Semond
95. Terrefondrée
96. Thoires
97. Vannaire
98. Vanvey
99. Vertault
100. Veuxhaulles-sur-Aube
101. Villaines-en-Duesmois
102. Villedieu
103. Villers-Patras
104. Villiers-le-Duc
105. Villotte-sur-Ource
106. Vix
107. Voulaines-les-Templiers
