= Beaunotte =

- Commune
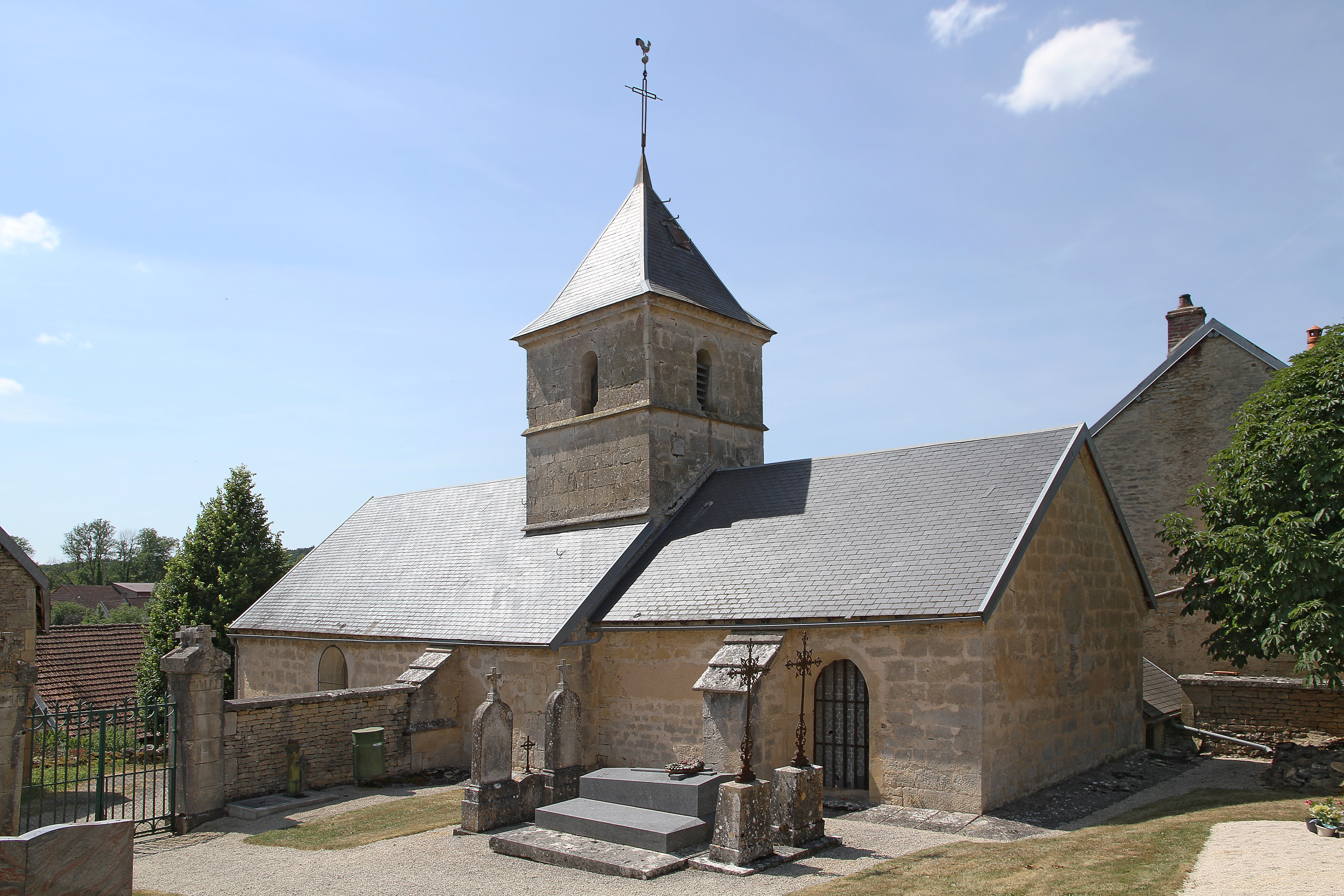
- The church in Beaunotte

- Coat of arms
- Location of Beaunotte
- Location within France Location within Bourgogne-Franche-Comté
- Coordinates: 47°40′43″N 4°42′23″E
- Country: France
- Region: Bourgogne-Franche-Comté
- Department: Côte-d'Or
- Arrondissement: Montbard
- Canton: Châtillon-sur-Seine
- Intercommunality: Pays Châtillonnais

Government
  - Mayor (2020–2026): Michaël Caplet
- Area^{1}: 8.5 km^{2} (3.3 sq mi)
- Elevation: 326 m (1,070 ft)
- Highest elevation: 423 m (1,388 ft)
- Lowest elevation: 292 m (958 ft)
- Population (2023): 16
  - Density: 1.9/km^{2} (4.9/sq mi)
- Time zone: UTC+01:00 (CET)
  - Summer (DST): UTC+02:00 (CEST)
- INSEE/Postal code: 21055 /21510
- ^{1} French Land Register data, which excludes lakes, ponds, glaciers > 1 km^{2} (0.386 sq mi or 247 acres) and river estuaries.

Beaunotte (French pronunciation: [bonɔt]) is a commune in the Côte-d'Or department in eastern France.

== Population ==
Historical population
| Year | Pop. | ±% p.a. |
|---|---|---|
| 1968 | 40 | — |
| 1975 | 46 | +2.02% |
| 1982 | 46 | +0.00% |
| 1990 | 37 | −2.68% |
| 1999 | 27 | −3.44% |
| 2007 | 22 | −2.53% |
| 2012 | 21 | −0.93% |
| 2017 | 19 | −1.98% |
| 2023 | 16 | −2.82% |
Source: INSEE

== See also ==
- Communes of the Côte-d'Or department
