= Savoisy =

- Commune
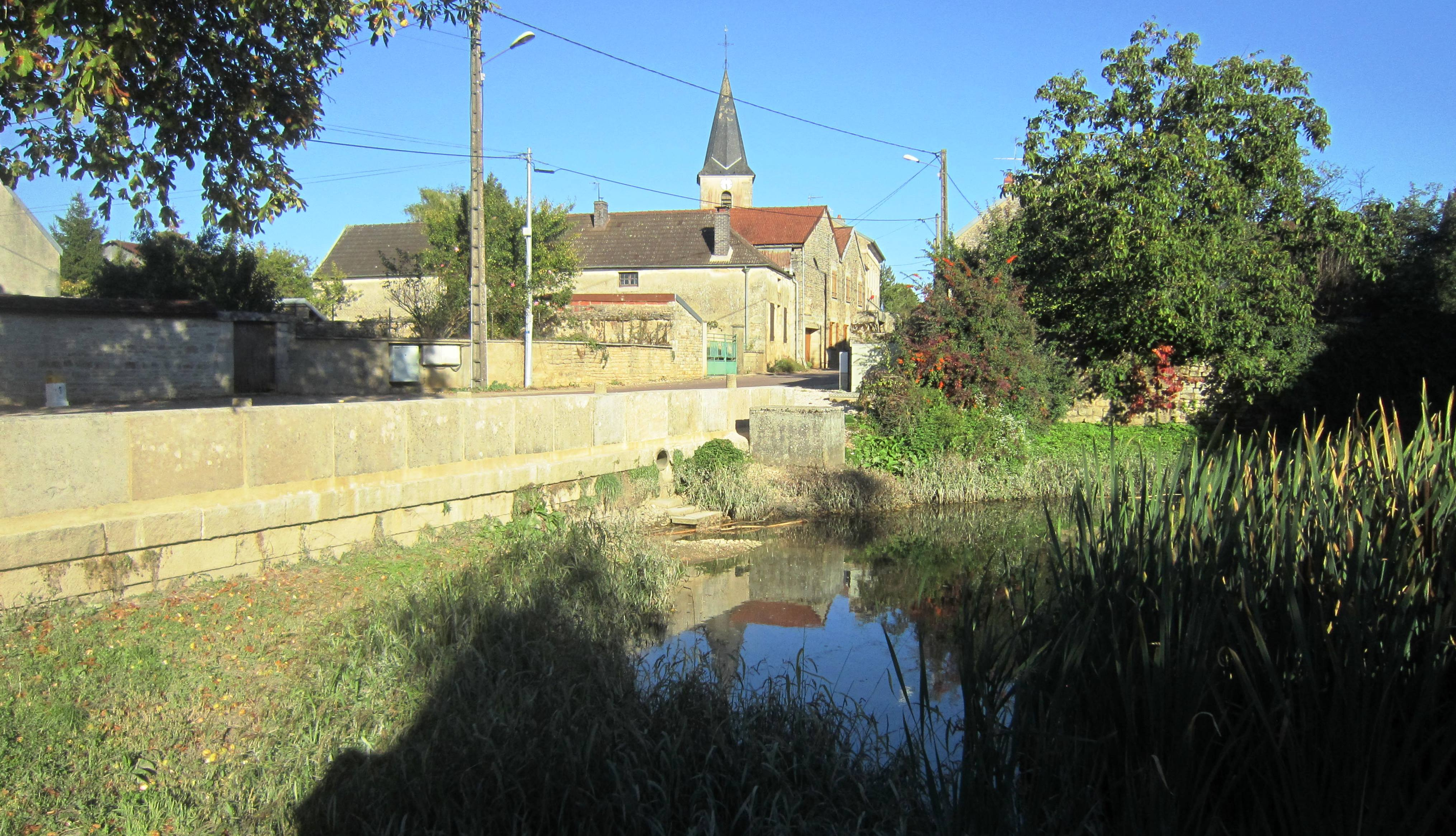
- A view within Savoisy

- Coat of arms
- Location of Savoisy
- Location within France Location within Bourgogne-Franche-Comté
- Coordinates: 47°43′52″N 4°24′52″E
- Country: France
- Region: Bourgogne-Franche-Comté
- Department: Côte-d'Or
- Arrondissement: Montbard
- Canton: Châtillon-sur-Seine

Government
  - Mayor (2025–2026): Alain Thevenet
- Area^{1}: 24.77 km^{2} (9.56 sq mi)
- Elevation: 340 m (1,120 ft)
- Highest elevation: 341 m (1,119 ft)
- Lowest elevation: 259 m (850 ft)
- Population (2023): 194
  - Density: 7.83/km^{2} (20.3/sq mi)
- Time zone: UTC+01:00 (CET)
  - Summer (DST): UTC+02:00 (CEST)
- INSEE/Postal code: 21594 /21500
- ^{1} French Land Register data, which excludes lakes, ponds, glaciers > 1 km^{2} (0.386 sq mi or 247 acres) and river estuaries.

Savoisy (French pronunciation: [savwazi]) is a commune in the Côte-d'Or department in eastern France.

== Population ==
Historical population
| Year | Pop. | ±% p.a. |
|---|---|---|
| 1968 | 287 | — |
| 1975 | 243 | −2.35% |
| 1982 | 242 | −0.06% |
| 1990 | 249 | +0.36% |
| 1999 | 246 | −0.13% |
| 2007 | 227 | −1.00% |
| 2012 | 204 | −2.11% |
| 2017 | 200 | −0.40% |
| 2023 | 194 | −0.51% |
Source: INSEE

== See also ==
- Communes of the Côte-d'Or department
