= Meulson =

- Commune
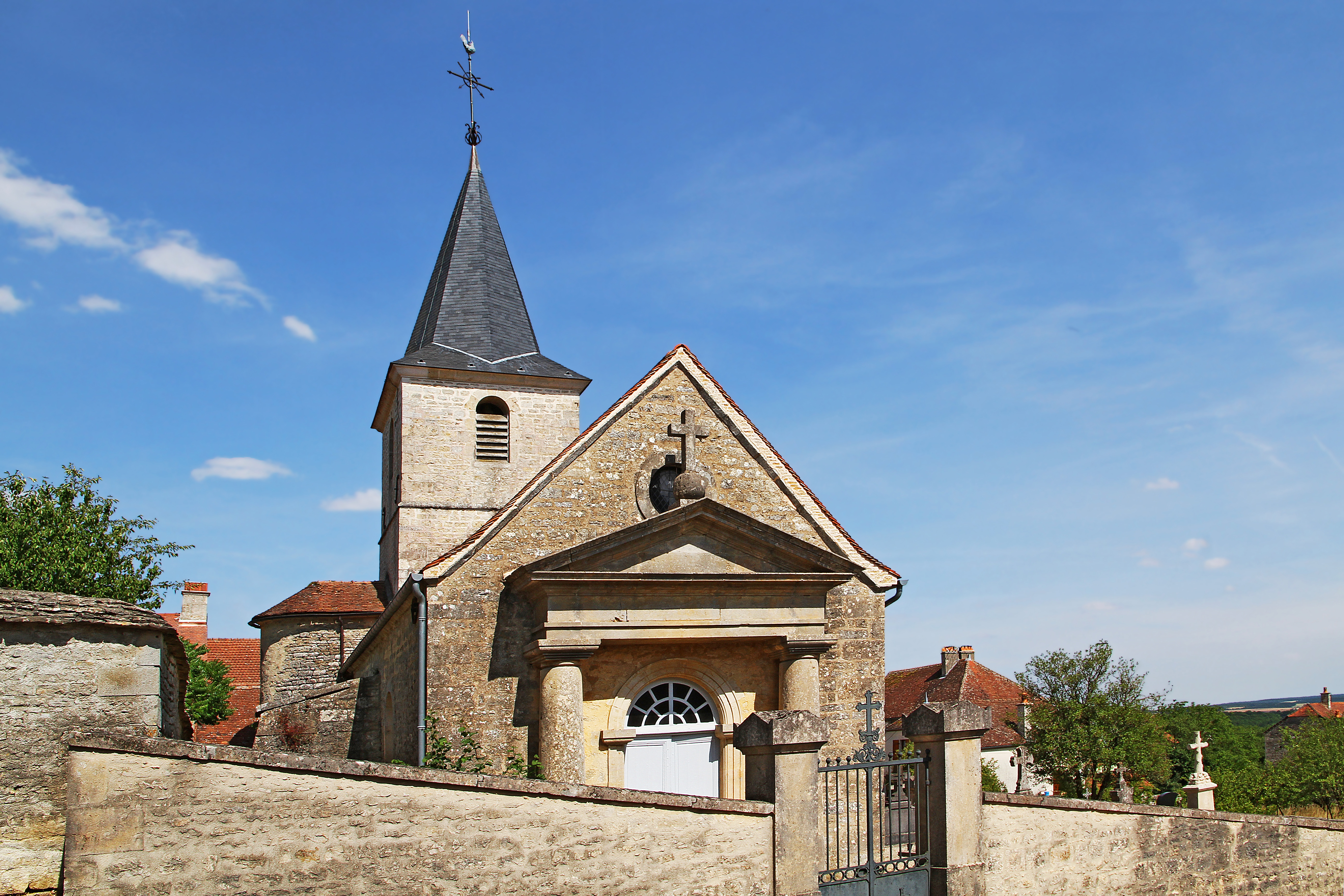
- The church in Meulson

- Coat of arms
- Location of Meulson
- Location within France Location within Bourgogne-Franche-Comté
- Coordinates: 47°41′21″N 4°41′56″E
- Country: France
- Region: Bourgogne-Franche-Comté
- Department: Côte-d'Or
- Arrondissement: Montbard
- Canton: Châtillon-sur-Seine
- Intercommunality: Pays Châtillonnais

Government
  - Mayor (2020–2026): Séverine Goustiaux
- Area^{1}: 7.85 km^{2} (3.03 sq mi)
- Elevation: 422 m (1,385 ft)
- Highest elevation: 427 m (1,401 ft)
- Lowest elevation: 345 m (1,132 ft)
- Population (2023): 28
  - Density: 3.6/km^{2} (9.2/sq mi)
- Time zone: UTC+01:00 (CET)
  - Summer (DST): UTC+02:00 (CEST)
- INSEE/Postal code: 21410 /21510
- ^{1} French Land Register data, which excludes lakes, ponds, glaciers > 1 km^{2} (0.386 sq mi or 247 acres) and river estuaries.

Meulson (French pronunciation: [mølsɔ̃]) is a commune in the Côte-d'Or department in eastern France.

== Population ==
Historical population
Year	Pop.	±% p.a.
1968	68	—
1975	53	−3.50%
1982	39	−4.29%
1990	44	+1.52%
1999	37	−1.91%
2007	38	+0.33%
2012	39	+0.52%
2017	33	−3.29%
2023	28	−2.70%
Source: INSEE

== See also ==
- Communes of the Côte-d'Or department
