= Gevrolles =

- Commune
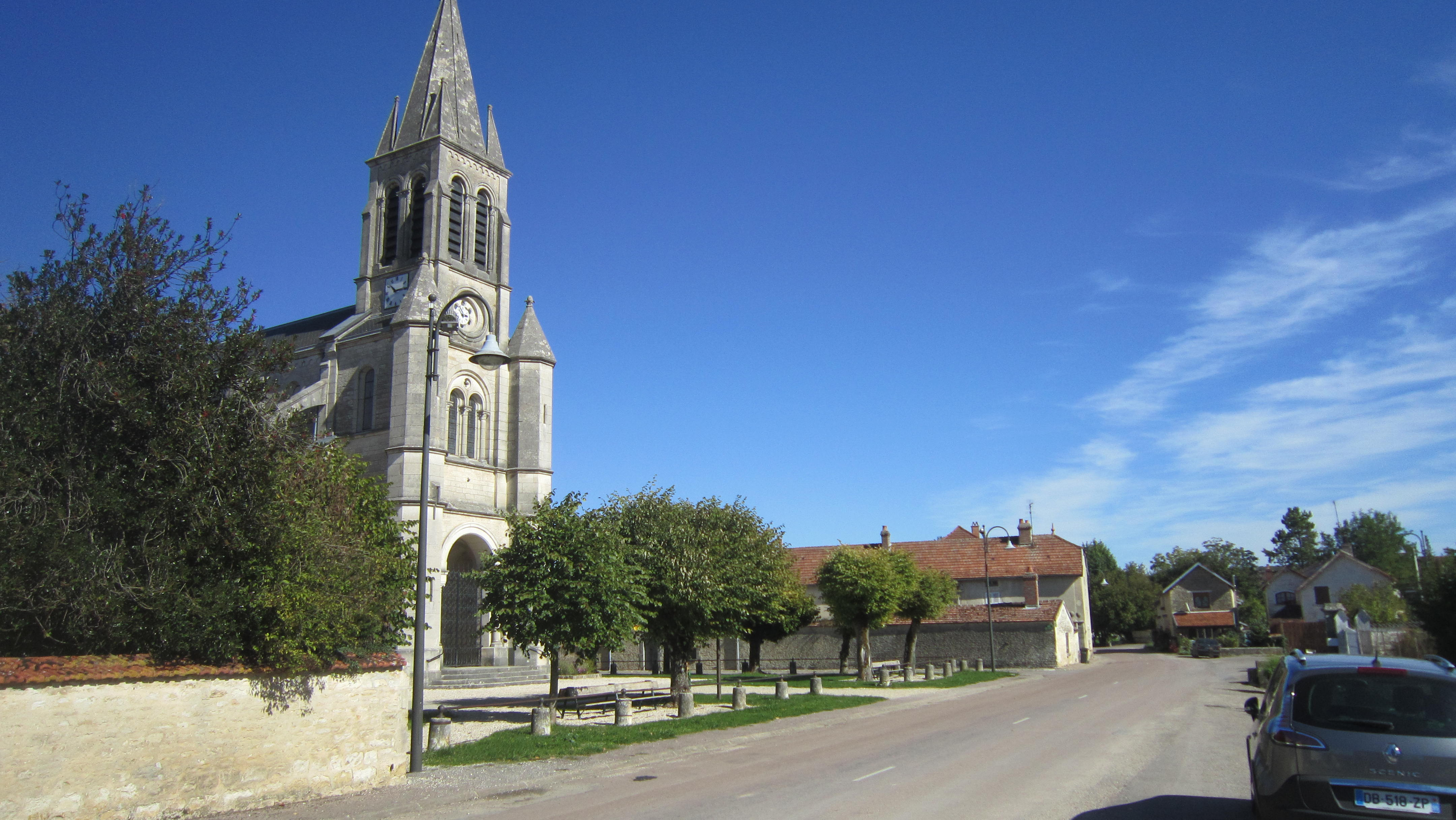
- The church and surroundings in Gevrolles
- Location of Gevrolles
- Location within France Location within Bourgogne-Franche-Comté
- Coordinates: 47°59′18″N 4°46′45″E
- Country: France
- Region: Bourgogne-Franche-Comté
- Department: Côte-d'Or
- Arrondissement: Montbard
- Canton: Châtillon-sur-Seine
- Intercommunality: Pays Châtillonnais

Government
  - Mayor (2020–2026): Nolwenn Claudon
- Area^{1}: 27.05 km^{2} (10.44 sq mi)
- Elevation: 230 m (750 ft)
- Highest elevation: 353 m (1,158 ft)
- Lowest elevation: 216 m (709 ft)
- Population (2023): 162
  - Density: 5.99/km^{2} (15.5/sq mi)
- Time zone: UTC+01:00 (CET)
  - Summer (DST): UTC+02:00 (CEST)
- INSEE/Postal code: 21296 /21520
- ^{1} French Land Register data, which excludes lakes, ponds, glaciers > 1 km^{2} (0.386 sq mi or 247 acres) and river estuaries.

Gevrolles (French pronunciation: [ʒəvʁɔl]) is a commune in the Côte-d'Or department in eastern France.

== Population ==
Historical population
Year	Pop.	±% p.a.
1968	251	—
1975	203	−2.99%
1982	201	−0.14%
1990	176	−1.65%
1999	170	−0.38%
2007	159	−0.83%
2012	177	+2.17%
2017	178	+0.11%
2023	162	−1.56%
Source: INSEE

== See also ==
- Communes of the Côte-d'Or department
