= Terrefondrée =

- Commune
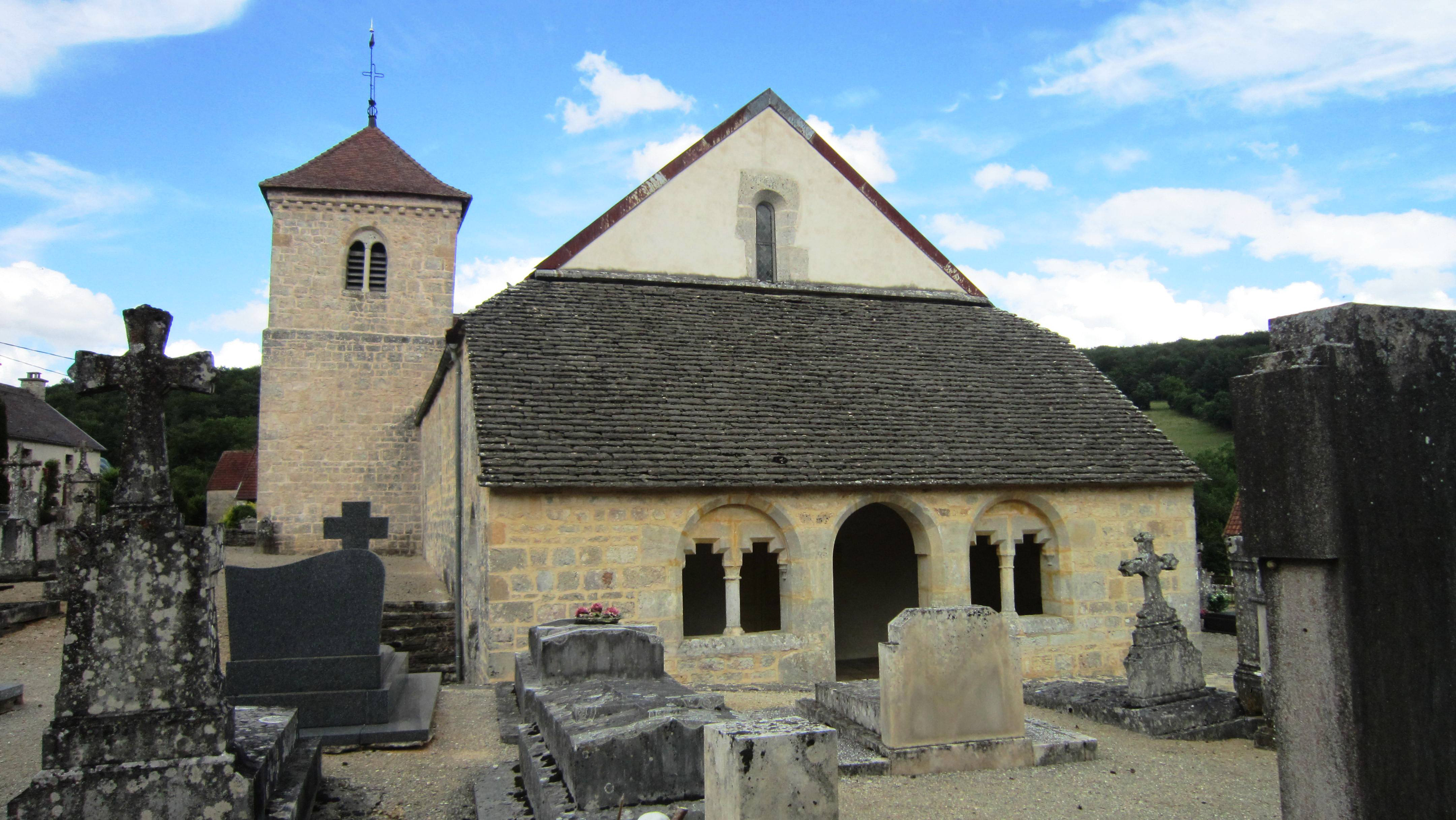
- The church in Terrefondrée

- Coat of arms
- Location of Terrefondrée
- Location within France Location within Bourgogne-Franche-Comté
- Coordinates: 47°43′52″N 4°51′55″E
- Country: France
- Region: Bourgogne-Franche-Comté
- Department: Côte-d'Or
- Arrondissement: Montbard
- Canton: Châtillon-sur-Seine
- Intercommunality: Pays Châtillonnais

Government
  - Mayor (2020–2026): Baptiste Bongard
- Area^{1}: 13.89 km^{2} (5.36 sq mi)
- Elevation: 340 m (1,120 ft)
- Highest elevation: 452 m (1,483 ft)
- Lowest elevation: 307 m (1,007 ft)
- Population (2023): 69
  - Density: 5.0/km^{2} (13/sq mi)
- Time zone: UTC+01:00 (CET)
  - Summer (DST): UTC+02:00 (CEST)
- INSEE/Postal code: 21626 /21290
- ^{1} French Land Register data, which excludes lakes, ponds, glaciers > 1 km^{2} (0.386 sq mi or 247 acres) and river estuaries.

Terrefondrée (French pronunciation: [tɛʁfɔ̃dʁe]) is a commune in the Côte-d'Or department in eastern France.

== Population ==
Historical population
Year	Pop.	±% p.a.
1968	112	—
1975	73	−5.93%
1982	78	+0.95%
1990	65	−2.25%
1999	60	−0.89%
2007	59	−0.21%
2012	68	+2.88%
2017	62	−1.83%
2023	69	+1.80%
Source: INSEE

== See also ==
- Communes of the Côte-d'Or department
