= Charrey-sur-Seine =

- Commune
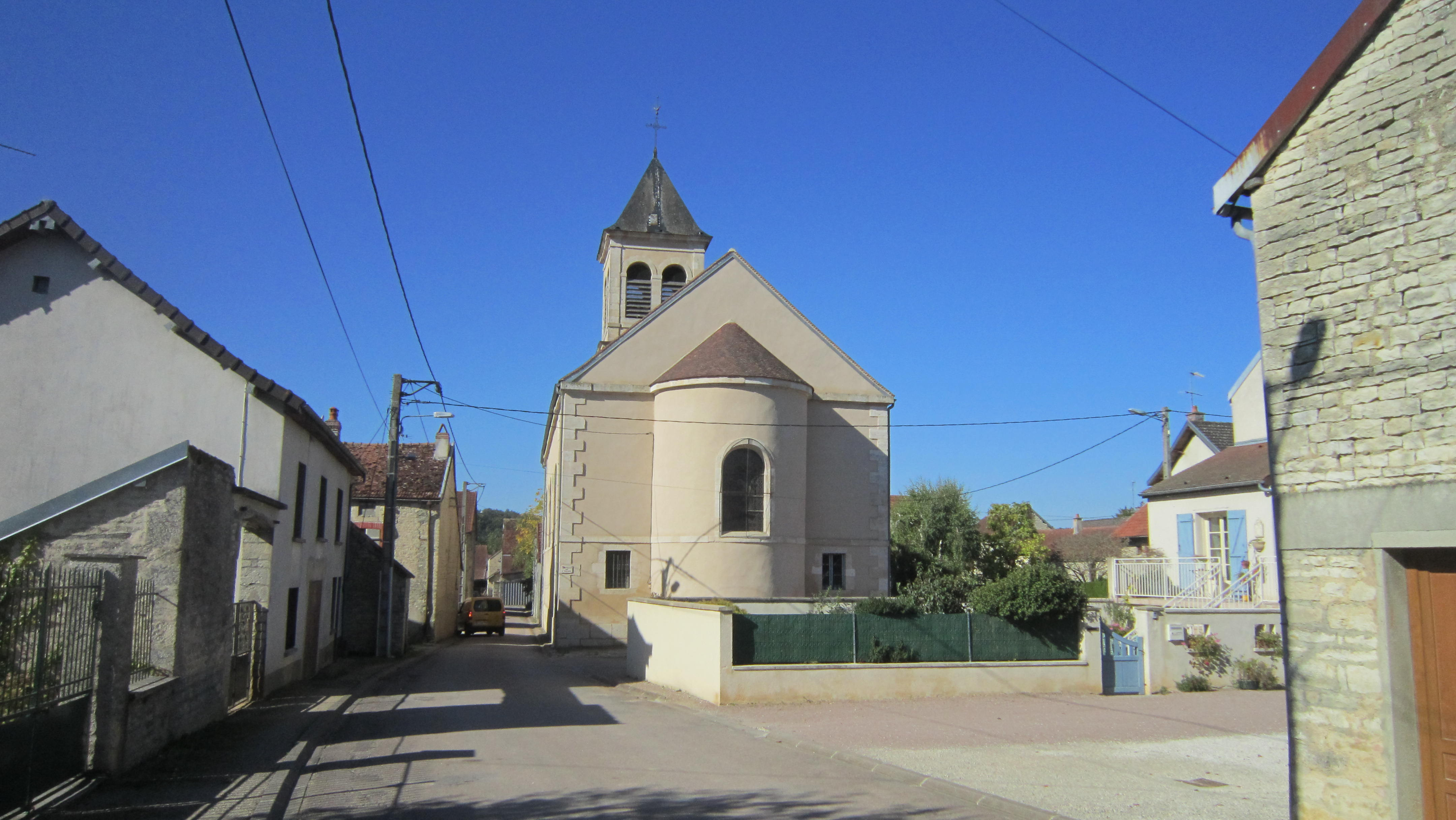
- The church in Charrey-sur-Seine

- Coat of arms
- Location of Charrey-sur-Seine
- Location within France Location within Bourgogne-Franche-Comté
- Coordinates: 47°56′43″N 4°30′49″E
- Country: France
- Region: Bourgogne-Franche-Comté
- Department: Côte-d'Or
- Arrondissement: Montbard
- Canton: Châtillon-sur-Seine
- Intercommunality: Pays Châtillonnais

Government
  - Mayor (2020–2026): Fernando Gonzalez
- Area^{1}: 12.68 km^{2} (4.90 sq mi)
- Elevation: 194 m (636 ft)
- Highest elevation: 356 m (1,168 ft)
- Lowest elevation: 191 m (627 ft)
- Population (2023): 136
  - Density: 10.7/km^{2} (27.8/sq mi)
- Time zone: UTC+01:00 (CET)
  - Summer (DST): UTC+02:00 (CEST)
- INSEE/Postal code: 21149 /21400
- ^{1} French Land Register data, which excludes lakes, ponds, glaciers > 1 km^{2} (0.386 sq mi or 247 acres) and river estuaries.

Charrey-sur-Seine (French pronunciation: [ʃaʁɛ syʁ sɛn], literally Charrey on Seine, before 1985: Charrey) is a commune in the Côte-d'Or department in eastern France.

== Population ==
Historical population
Year	Pop.	±% p.a.
1968	193	—
1975	211	+1.28%
1982	190	−1.49%
1990	154	−2.59%
1999	139	−1.13%
2007	126	−1.22%
2012	180	+7.39%
2017	145	−4.23%
2023	136	−1.06%
Source: INSEE

== See also ==
- Communes of the Côte-d'Or department
