= Mauvilly =

- Commune
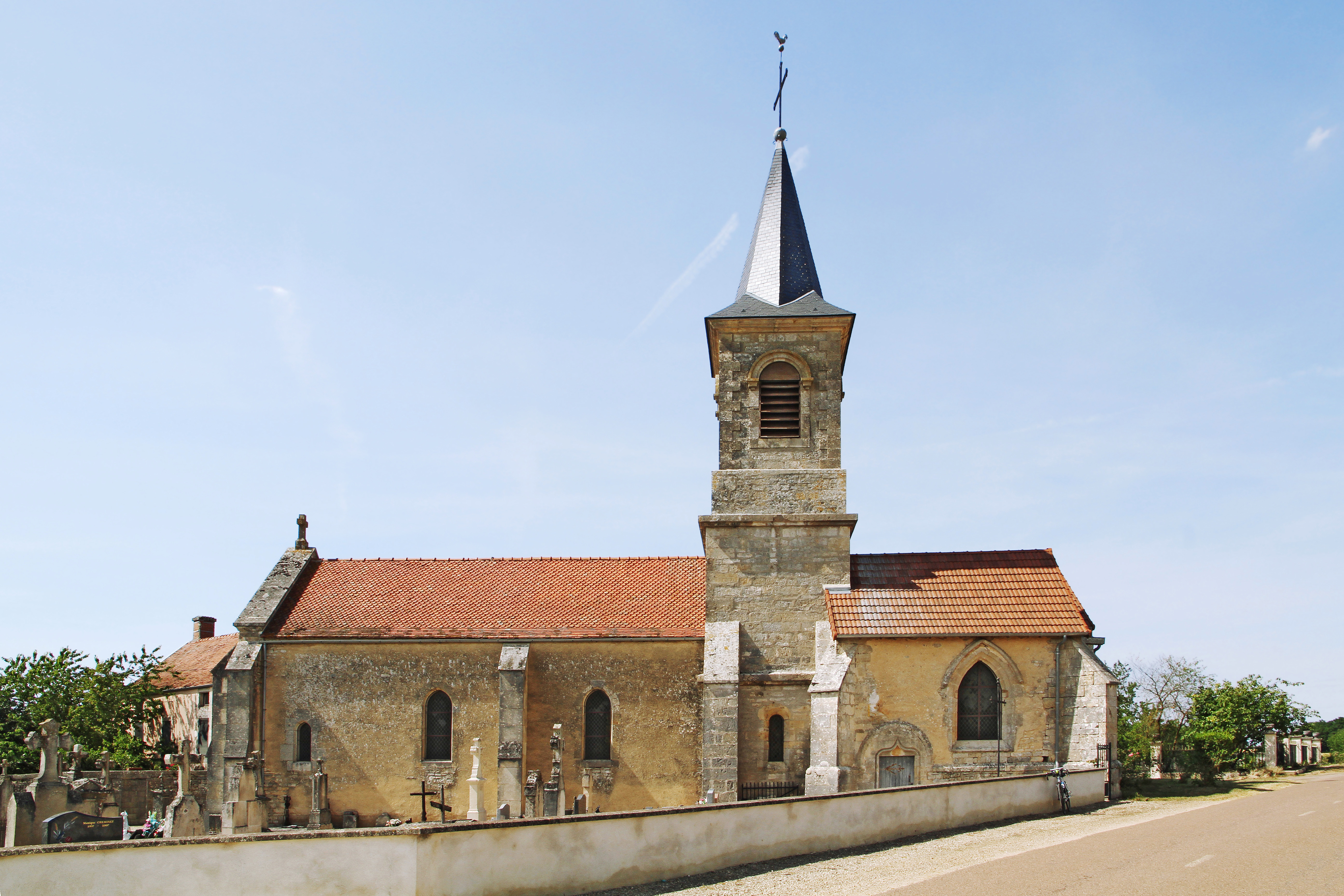
- The church in Mauvilly

- Coat of arms
- Location of Mauvilly
- Location within France Location within Bourgogne-Franche-Comté
- Coordinates: 47°42′30″N 4°41′54″E
- Country: France
- Region: Bourgogne-Franche-Comté
- Department: Côte-d'Or
- Arrondissement: Montbard
- Canton: Châtillon-sur-Seine
- Intercommunality: Pays Châtillonnais

Government
  - Mayor (2020–2026): Henri Chevallier
- Area^{1}: 15.31 km^{2} (5.91 sq mi)
- Elevation: 410 m (1,350 ft)
- Highest elevation: 424 m (1,391 ft)
- Lowest elevation: 325 m (1,066 ft)
- Population (2023): 61
  - Density: 4.0/km^{2} (10/sq mi)
- Time zone: UTC+01:00 (CET)
  - Summer (DST): UTC+02:00 (CEST)
- INSEE/Postal code: 21396 /21510
- ^{1} French Land Register data, which excludes lakes, ponds, glaciers > 1 km^{2} (0.386 sq mi or 247 acres) and river estuaries.

Mauvilly is a commune in the Côte-d'Or department in eastern France.

== Population ==
Historical population
Year	Pop.	±% p.a.
1968	94	—
1975	73	−3.55%
1982	70	−0.60%
1990	77	+1.20%
1999	88	+1.49%
2007	78	−1.50%
2012	70	−2.14%
2017	68	−0.58%
2023	61	−1.79%
Source: INSEE

== See also ==
- Communes of the Côte-d'Or department
