= Poiseul-la-Ville-et-Laperrière =

- Commune
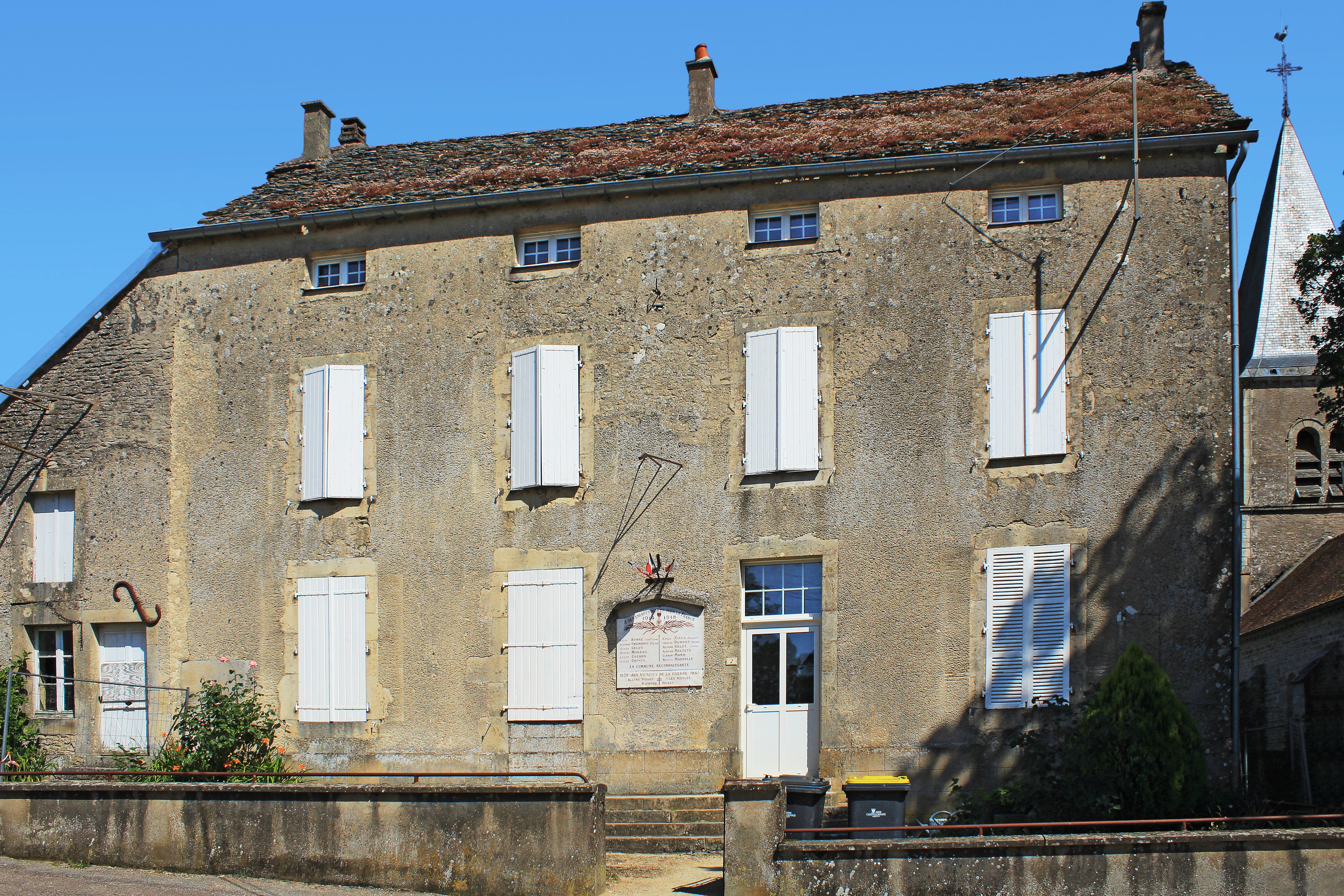
- Town hall
- Location of Poiseul-la-Ville-et-Laperrière
- Location within France Location within Bourgogne-Franche-Comté
- Coordinates: 47°33′46″N 4°40′14″E
- Country: France
- Region: Bourgogne-Franche-Comté
- Department: Côte-d'Or
- Arrondissement: Montbard
- Canton: Châtillon-sur-Seine
- Intercommunality: Pays Châtillonnais

Government
  - Mayor (2020–2026): François Pouhin
- Area^{1}: 21.64 km^{2} (8.36 sq mi)
- Elevation: 464 m (1,522 ft)
- Highest elevation: 462 m (1,516 ft)
- Lowest elevation: 338 m (1,109 ft)
- Population (2023): 154
  - Density: 7.12/km^{2} (18.4/sq mi)
- Time zone: UTC+01:00 (CET)
  - Summer (DST): UTC+02:00 (CEST)
- INSEE/Postal code: 21490 /21450
- ^{1} French Land Register data, which excludes lakes, ponds, glaciers > 1 km^{2} (0.386 sq mi or 247 acres) and river estuaries.

Poiseul-la-Ville-et-Laperrière (French pronunciation: [pwazœl la vil e lapɛʁjɛʁ]) is a commune in the Côte-d'Or department in eastern France.

== Population ==
Historical population
Year	Pop.	±% p.a.
1968	254	—
1975	230	−1.41%
1982	202	−1.84%
1990	183	−1.23%
1999	181	−0.12%
2007	170	−0.78%
2012	162	−0.96%
2017	160	−0.25%
2023	154	−0.63%
Source: INSEE

== See also ==
- Communes of the Côte-d'Or department
