= Bouix =

- Commune
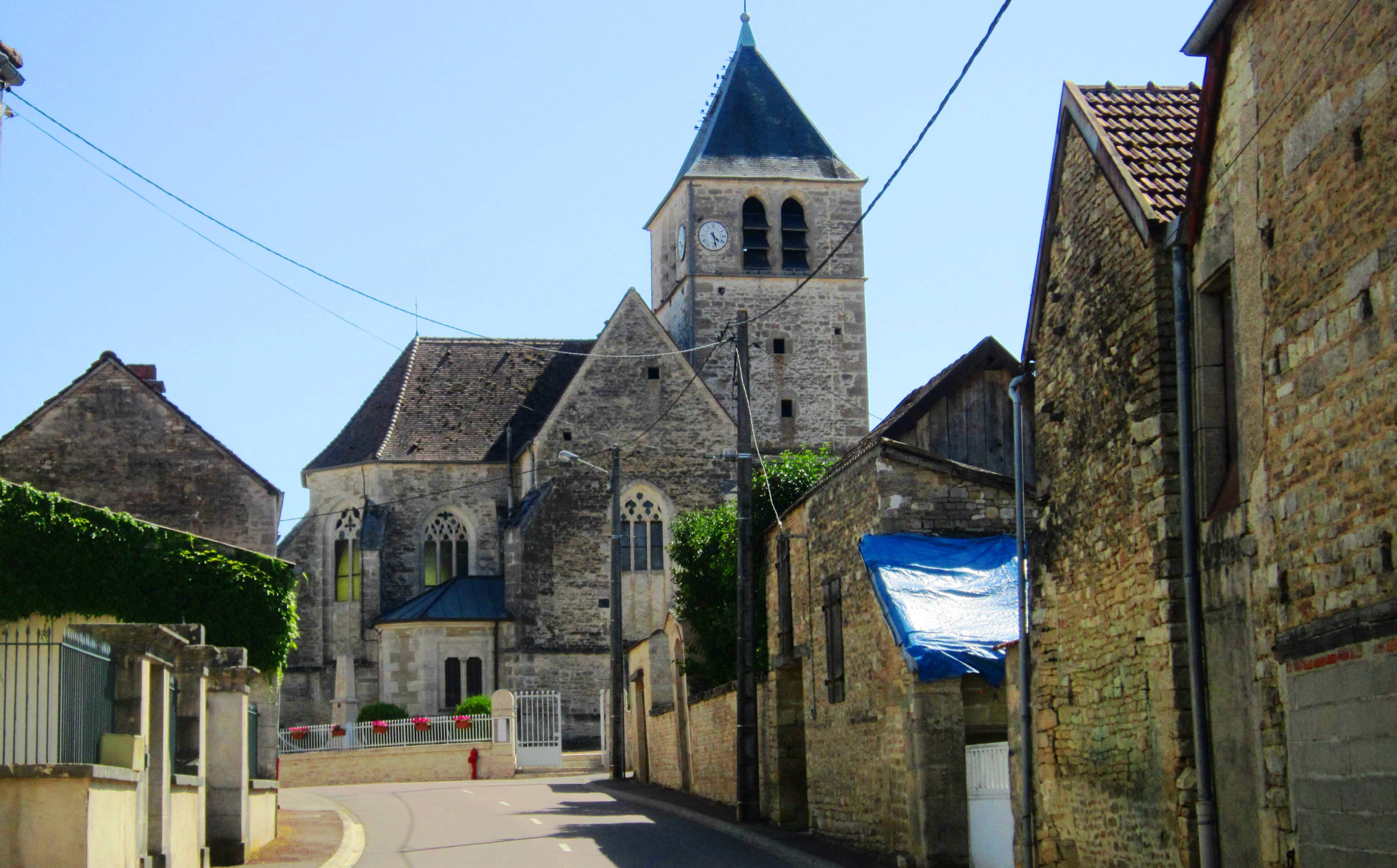
- The church in Bouix

- Coat of arms
- Location of Bouix
- Location within France Location within Bourgogne-Franche-Comté
- Coordinates: 47°53′17″N 4°29′06″E
- Country: France
- Region: Bourgogne-Franche-Comté
- Department: Côte-d'Or
- Arrondissement: Montbard
- Canton: Châtillon-sur-Seine
- Intercommunality: Pays Châtillonnais

Government
  - Mayor (2021–2026): Fabienne Mathieu
- Area^{1}: 15.64 km^{2} (6.04 sq mi)
- Elevation: 240 m (790 ft)
- Highest elevation: 344 m (1,129 ft)
- Lowest elevation: 211 m (692 ft)
- Population (2023): 150
  - Density: 9.6/km^{2} (25/sq mi)
- Time zone: UTC+01:00 (CET)
  - Summer (DST): UTC+02:00 (CEST)
- INSEE/Postal code: 21093 /21330
- ^{1} French Land Register data, which excludes lakes, ponds, glaciers > 1 km^{2} (0.386 sq mi or 247 acres) and river estuaries.

Bouix (French pronunciation: [bwi]) is a commune in the Côte-d'Or department in eastern France.

== Population ==
Historical population
Year	Pop.	±% p.a.
1968	196	—
1975	195	−0.07%
1982	179	−1.22%
1990	181	+0.14%
1999	187	+0.36%
2007	164	−1.63%
2012	154	−1.25%
2017	156	+0.26%
2023	150	−0.65%
Source: INSEE

== See also ==
- Communes of the Côte-d'Or department
