= Gurgy-le-Château =

- Commune
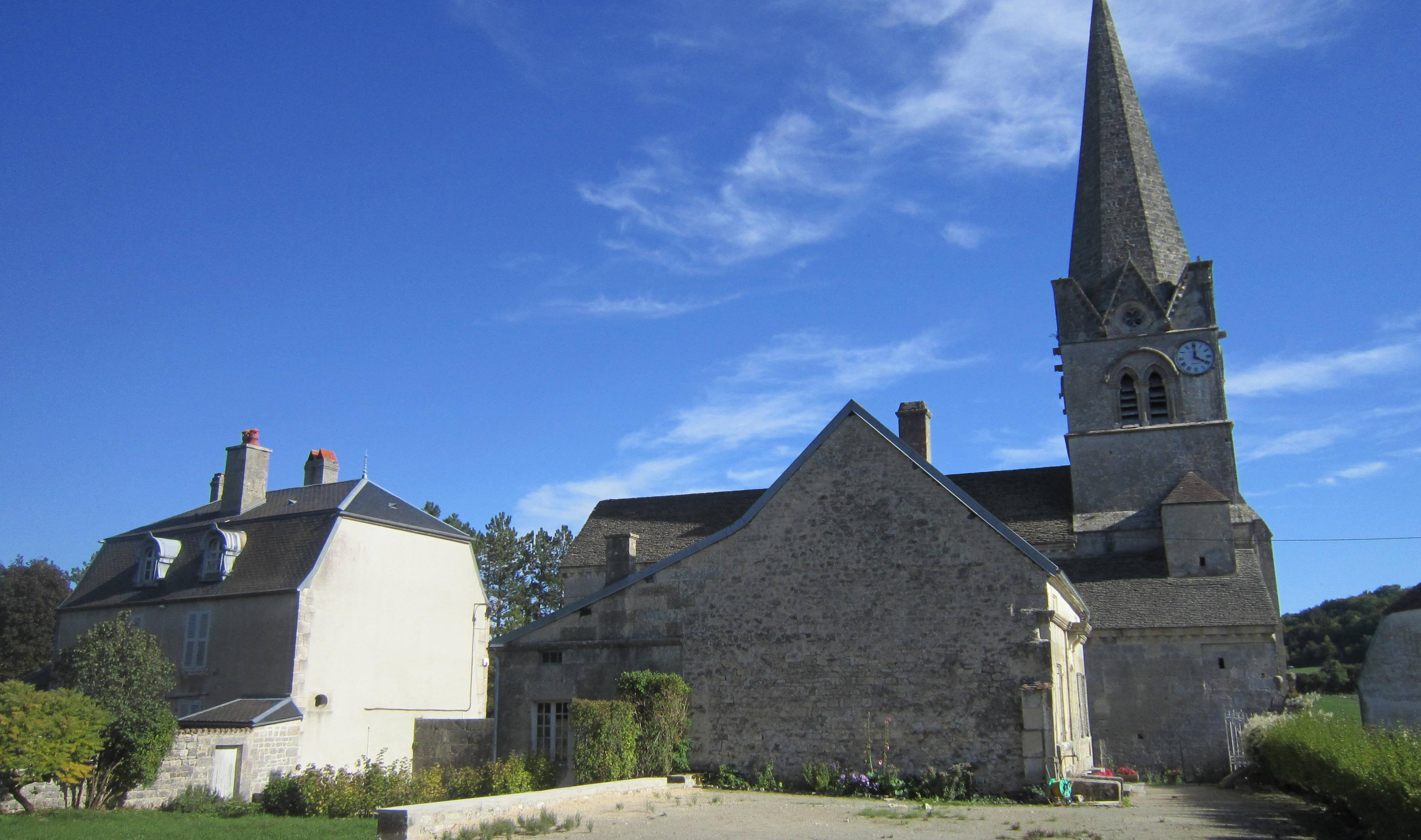
- The church in Gurgy-le-Château

- Coat of arms
- Location of Gurgy-le-Château
- Location within France Location within Bourgogne-Franche-Comté
- Coordinates: 47°49′38″N 4°55′38″E
- Country: France
- Region: Bourgogne-Franche-Comté
- Department: Côte-d'Or
- Arrondissement: Montbard
- Canton: Châtillon-sur-Seine
- Intercommunality: Pays Châtillonnais

Government
  - Mayor (2021–2026): Loup Bommier
- Area^{1}: 17.65 km^{2} (6.81 sq mi)
- Elevation: 370 m (1,210 ft)
- Highest elevation: 440 m (1,440 ft)
- Lowest elevation: 307 m (1,007 ft)
- Population (2023): 45
  - Density: 2.5/km^{2} (6.6/sq mi)
- Time zone: UTC+01:00 (CET)
  - Summer (DST): UTC+02:00 (CEST)
- INSEE/Postal code: 21313 /21290
- ^{1} French Land Register data, which excludes lakes, ponds, glaciers > 1 km^{2} (0.386 sq mi or 247 acres) and river estuaries.

Gurgy-le-Château (French pronunciation: [ɡyʁʒi l(ə) ʃɑto]) is a commune in the Côte-d'Or department in eastern France.

== Population ==
Historical population
Year	Pop.	±% p.a.
1968	110	—
1975	87	−3.30%
1982	84	−0.50%
1990	68	−2.61%
1999	61	−1.20%
2007	51	−2.21%
2012	43	−3.35%
2017	44	+0.46%
2023	45	+0.38%
Source: INSEE

== See also ==
- Communes of the Côte-d'Or department
