= Noiron-sur-Seine =

- Commune
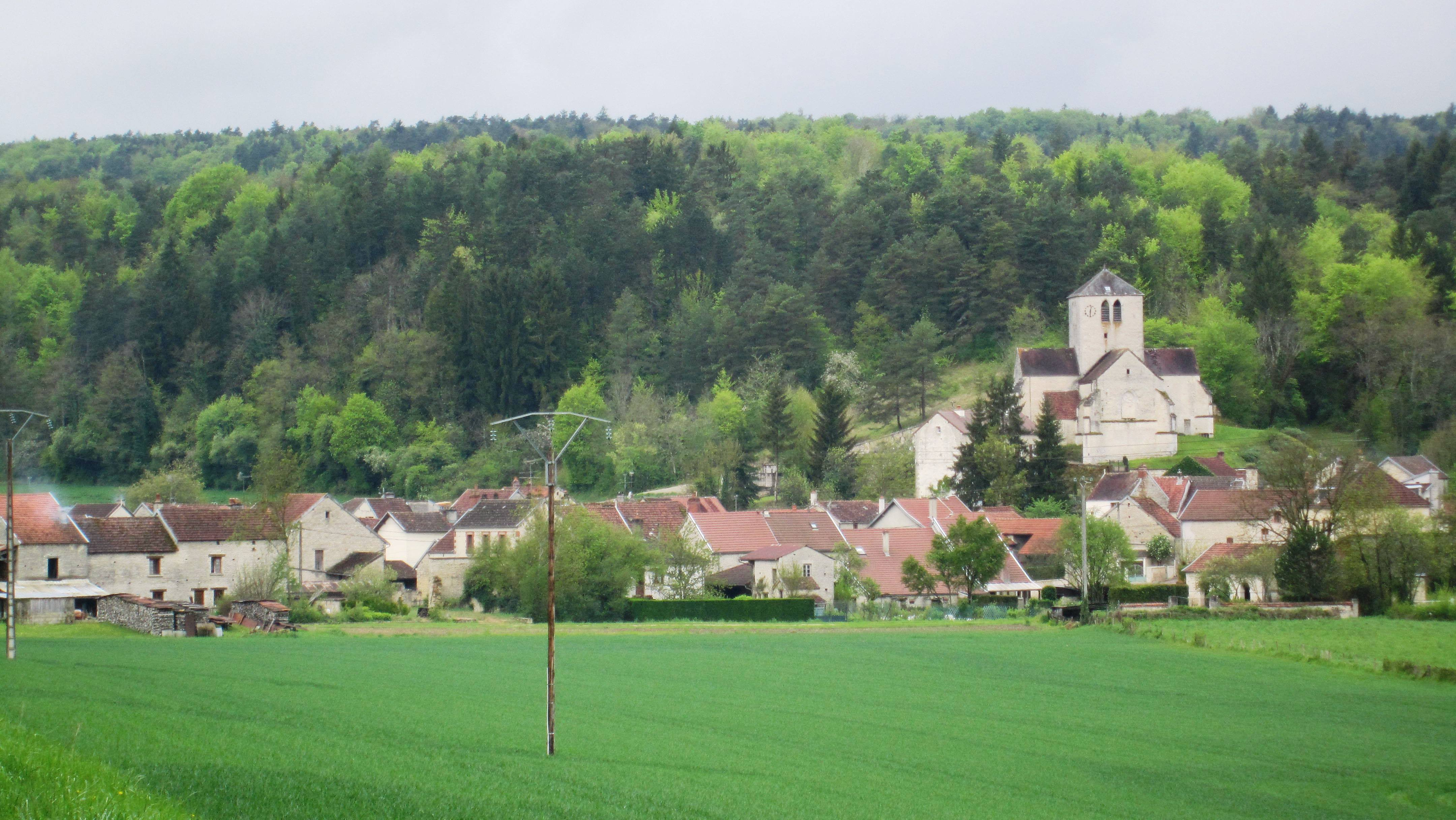
- A general view of Noiron-sur-Seine

- Coat of arms
- Location of Noiron-sur-Seine
- Location within France Location within Bourgogne-Franche-Comté
- Coordinates: 47°56′53″N 4°29′12″E
- Country: France
- Region: Bourgogne-Franche-Comté
- Department: Côte-d'Or
- Arrondissement: Montbard
- Canton: Châtillon-sur-Seine
- Intercommunality: Pays Châtillonnais

Government
  - Mayor (2020–2026): Florent Chodat
- Area^{1}: 11.38 km^{2} (4.39 sq mi)
- Elevation: 352 m (1,155 ft)
- Highest elevation: 347 m (1,138 ft)
- Lowest elevation: 192 m (630 ft)
- Population (2023): 62
  - Density: 5.4/km^{2} (14/sq mi)
- Time zone: UTC+01:00 (CET)
  - Summer (DST): UTC+02:00 (CEST)
- INSEE/Postal code: 21460 /21400
- ^{1} French Land Register data, which excludes lakes, ponds, glaciers > 1 km^{2} (0.386 sq mi or 247 acres) and river estuaries.

Noiron-sur-Seine (French pronunciation: [nwaʁɔ̃ syʁ sɛn], literally Noiron on Seine) is a commune in the Côte-d'Or department in eastern France.

== Population ==
Historical population
| Year | Pop. | ±% p.a. |
|---|---|---|
| 1968 | 131 | — |
| 1975 | 114 | −1.97% |
| 1982 | 109 | −0.64% |
| 1990 | 98 | −1.32% |
| 1999 | 91 | −0.82% |
| 2007 | 88 | −0.42% |
| 2012 | 81 | −1.64% |
| 2017 | 72 | −2.33% |
| 2023 | 62 | −2.46% |
Source: INSEE

== See also ==
- Communes of the Côte-d'Or department
