= Vannaire =

- Commune
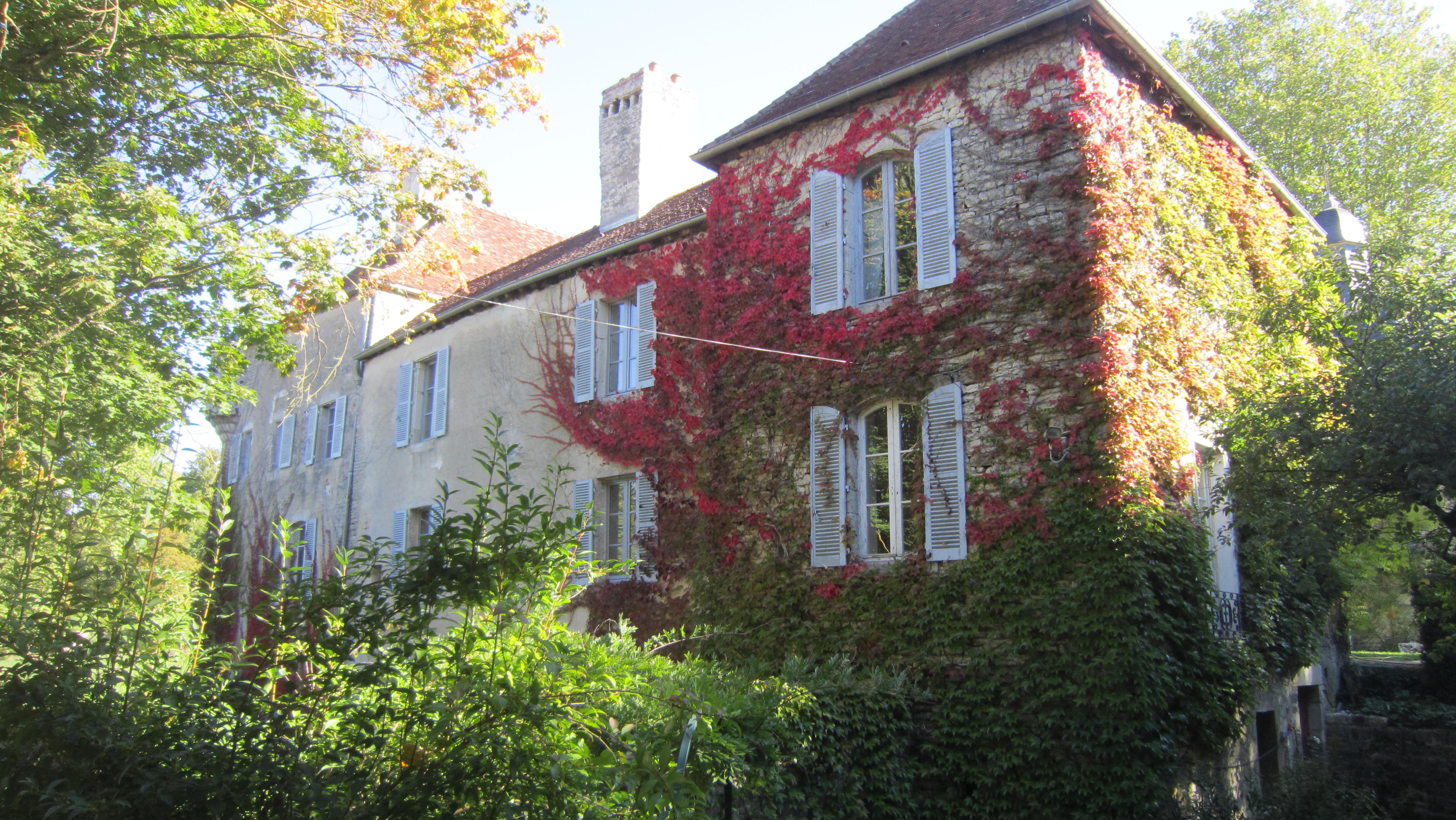
- The chateau in Vannaire

- Coat of arms
- Location of Vannaire
- Location within France Location within Bourgogne-Franche-Comté
- Coordinates: 47°54′52″N 4°34′12″E
- Country: France
- Region: Bourgogne-Franche-Comté
- Department: Côte-d'Or
- Arrondissement: Montbard
- Canton: Châtillon-sur-Seine
- Intercommunality: Pays Châtillonnais

Government
  - Mayor (2020–2026): Stéphane Roussel
- Area^{1}: 3.5 km^{2} (1.4 sq mi)
- Elevation: 210 m (690 ft)
- Highest elevation: 316 m (1,037 ft)
- Lowest elevation: 199 m (653 ft)
- Population (2023): 48
  - Density: 14/km^{2} (36/sq mi)
- Time zone: UTC+01:00 (CET)
  - Summer (DST): UTC+02:00 (CEST)
- INSEE/Postal code: 21653 /21400
- ^{1} French Land Register data, which excludes lakes, ponds, glaciers > 1 km^{2} (0.386 sq mi or 247 acres) and river estuaries.

Vannaire (French pronunciation: [vanɛʁ]) is a commune in the Côte-d'Or department in eastern France.

== Population ==
Historical population
Year	Pop.	±% p.a.
1968	45	—
1975	43	−0.65%
1982	36	−2.51%
1990	38	+0.68%
1999	37	−0.30%
2007	64	+7.09%
2012	57	−2.29%
2017	54	−1.08%
2023	48	−1.94%
Source: INSEE

== See also ==
- Communes of the Côte-d'Or department
