= Boudreville =

- Commune
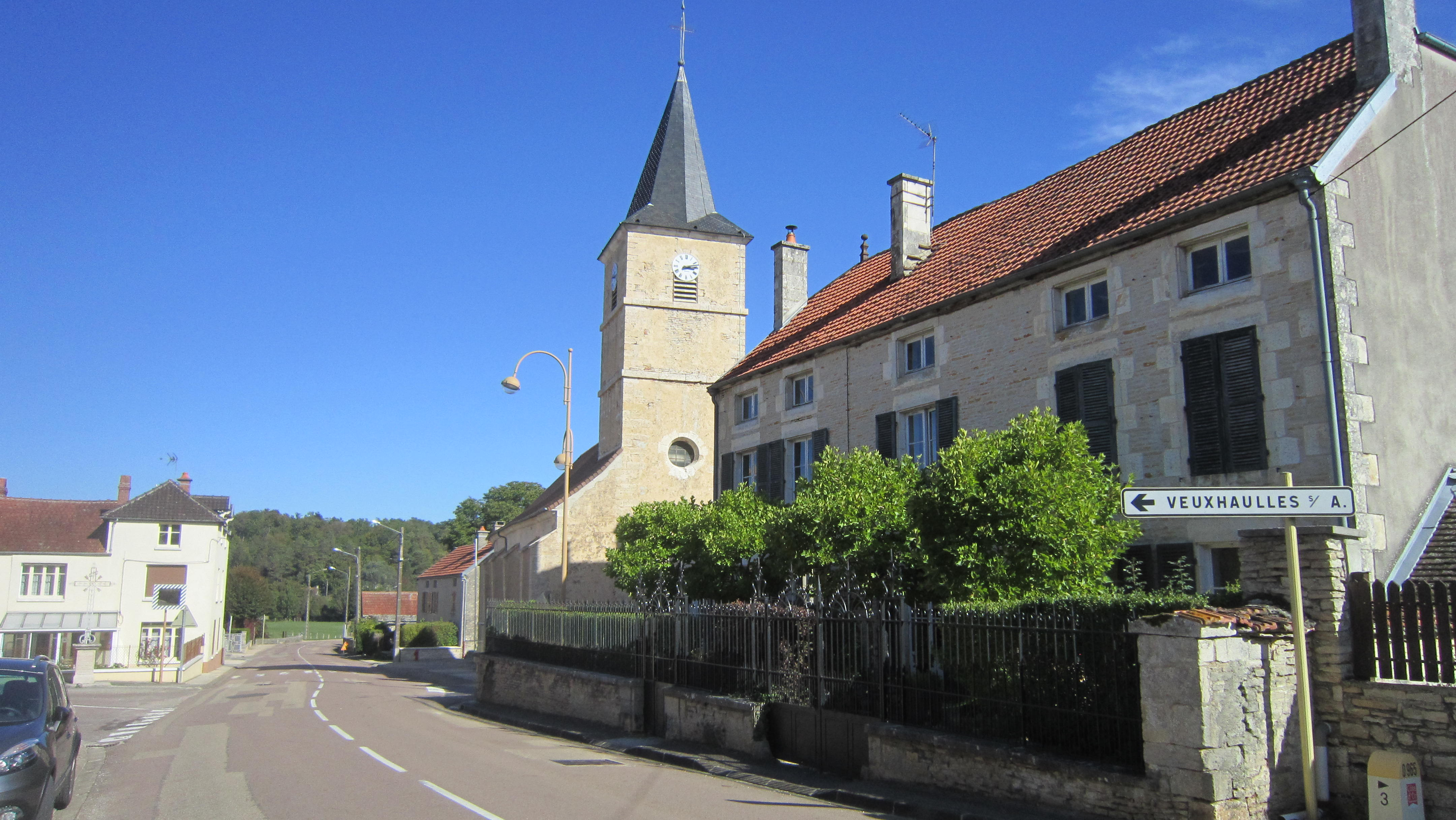
- The church and surroundings in Boudreville

- Coat of arms
- Location of Boudreville
- Location within France Location within Bourgogne-Franche-Comté
- Coordinates: 47°56′08″N 4°49′43″E
- Country: France
- Region: Bourgogne-Franche-Comté
- Department: Côte-d'Or
- Arrondissement: Montbard
- Canton: Châtillon-sur-Seine
- Intercommunality: Pays Châtillonnais

Government
  - Mayor (2023–2026): Gilles Boiteux
- Area^{1}: 7.94 km^{2} (3.07 sq mi)
- Elevation: 240 m (790 ft)
- Highest elevation: 312 m (1,024 ft)
- Lowest elevation: 238 m (781 ft)
- Population (2023): 58
  - Density: 7.3/km^{2} (19/sq mi)
- Time zone: UTC+01:00 (CET)
  - Summer (DST): UTC+02:00 (CEST)
- INSEE/Postal code: 21090 /21520
- ^{1} French Land Register data, which excludes lakes, ponds, glaciers > 1 km^{2} (0.386 sq mi or 247 acres) and river estuaries.

Boudreville (French pronunciation: [budʁəvil]) is a commune in the Côte-d'Or department in eastern France, in which the forest nearby (Le Bois de Fée) has a large population of boar, deer, and other animals. The forest is owned by George Garnier.

== Population ==
Historical population
Year	Pop.	±% p.a.
1968	83	—
1975	80	−0.52%
1982	86	+1.04%
1990	72	−2.20%
1999	76	+0.60%
2007	64	−2.13%
2012	67	+0.92%
2017	66	−0.30%
2023	58	−2.13%
Source: INSEE

== See also ==
- Communes of the Côte-d'Or department
