= Bure-les-Templiers =

- Commune
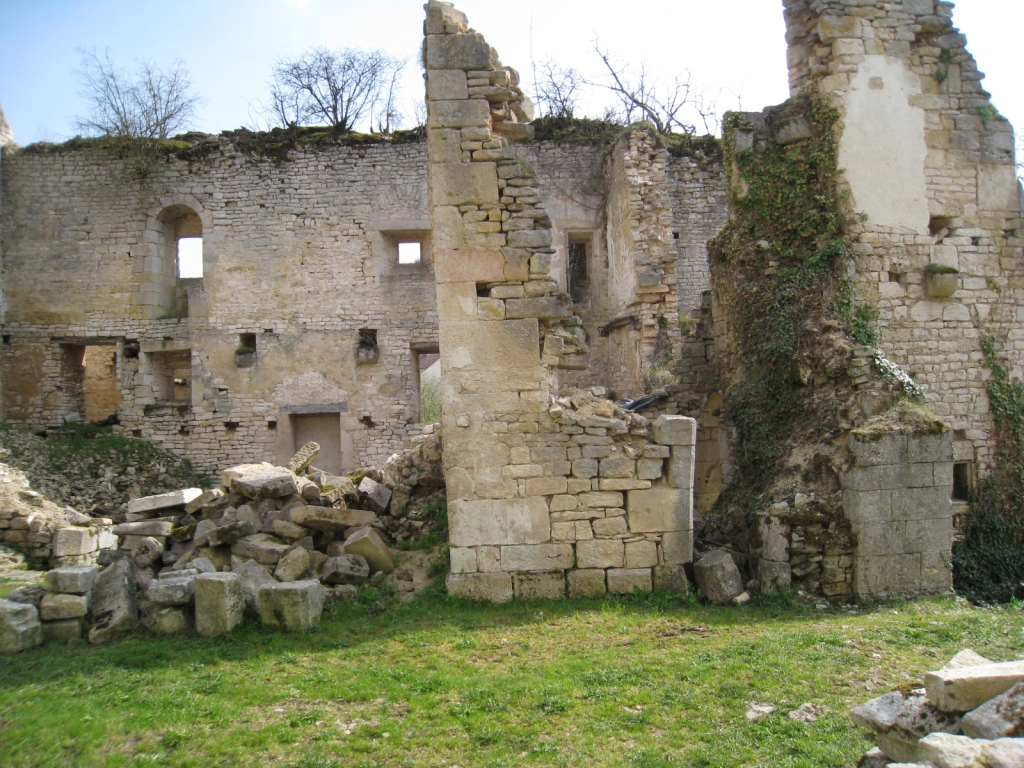
- Ruins of the Templar commandery

- Coat of arms
- Location of Bure-les-Templiers
- Location within France Location within Bourgogne-Franche-Comté
- Coordinates: 47°44′21″N 4°53′45″E
- Country: France
- Region: Bourgogne-Franche-Comté
- Department: Côte-d'Or
- Arrondissement: Montbard
- Canton: Châtillon-sur-Seine
- Intercommunality: Pays Châtillonnais

Government
  - Mayor (2020–2026): Jean-Charles Colombo
- Area^{1}: 35.03 km^{2} (13.53 sq mi)
- Elevation: 315 m (1,033 ft)
- Highest elevation: 483 m (1,585 ft)
- Lowest elevation: 302 m (991 ft)
- Population (2023): 135
  - Density: 3.85/km^{2} (9.98/sq mi)
- Time zone: UTC+01:00 (CET)
  - Summer (DST): UTC+02:00 (CEST)
- INSEE/Postal code: 21116 /21290
- ^{1} French Land Register data, which excludes lakes, ponds, glaciers > 1 km^{2} (0.386 sq mi or 247 acres) and river estuaries.

Bure-les-Templiers (French pronunciation: [byʁ le tɑ̃plije]) is a commune in the Côte-d'Or department in eastern France.

== Population ==
Historical population
| Year | Pop. | ±% p.a. |
|---|---|---|
| 1968 | 211 | — |
| 1975 | 172 | −2.88% |
| 1982 | 154 | −1.57% |
| 1990 | 130 | −2.10% |
| 1999 | 150 | +1.60% |
| 2007 | 135 | −1.31% |
| 2012 | 141 | +0.87% |
| 2017 | 134 | −1.01% |
| 2023 | 135 | +0.12% |
Source: INSEE

== See also ==
- Communes of the Côte-d'Or department
