= Gurgy-la-Ville =

- Commune
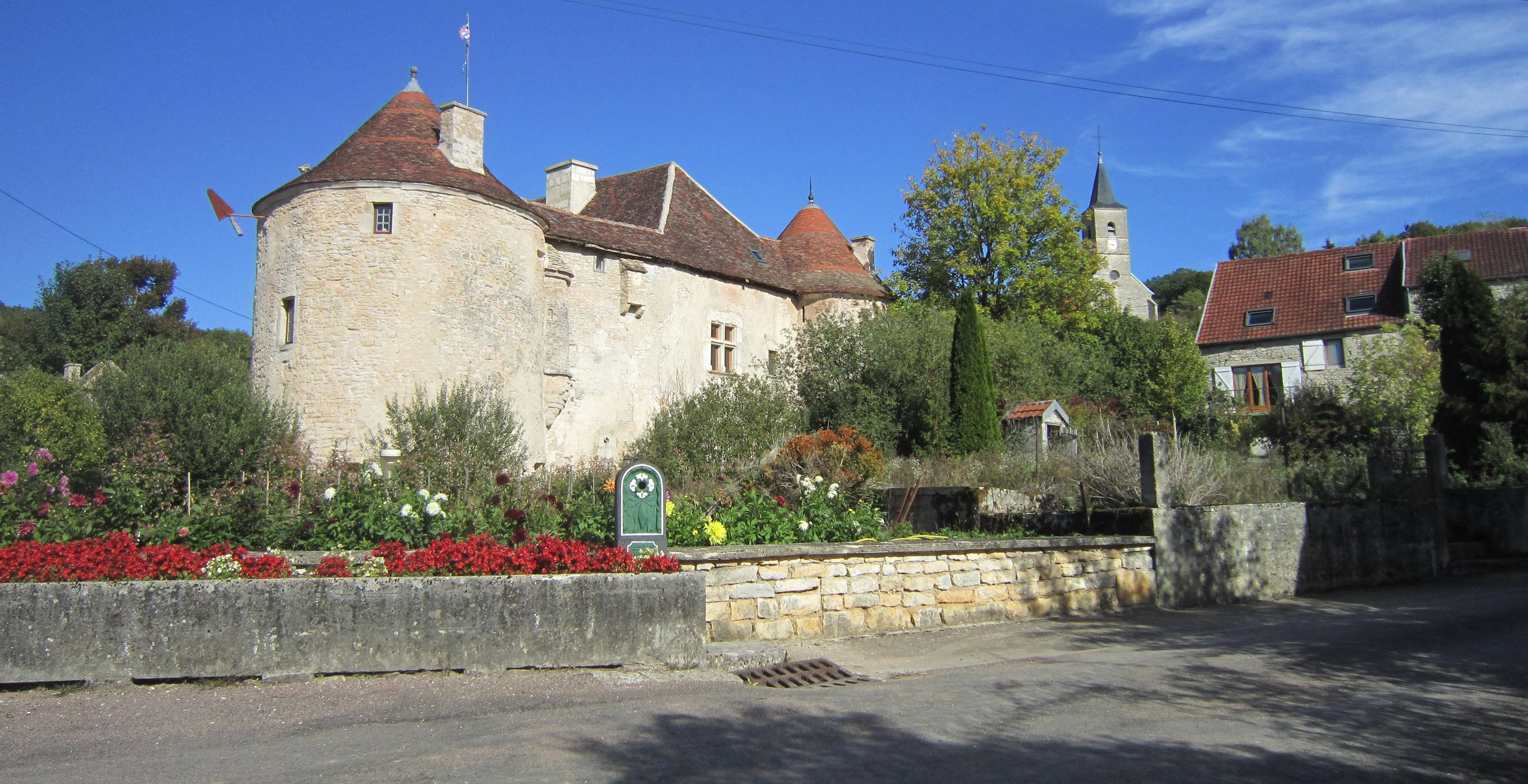
- A general view of Gurgy-la-Ville

- Coat of arms
- Location of Gurgy-la-Ville
- Location within France Location within Bourgogne-Franche-Comté
- Coordinates: 47°51′01″N 4°56′30″E
- Country: France
- Region: Bourgogne-Franche-Comté
- Department: Côte-d'Or
- Arrondissement: Montbard
- Canton: Châtillon-sur-Seine
- Intercommunality: Pays Châtillonnais

Government
  - Mayor (2020–2026): Katia Sullerot
- Area^{1}: 12.77 km^{2} (4.93 sq mi)
- Elevation: 378 m (1,240 ft)
- Highest elevation: 419 m (1,375 ft)
- Lowest elevation: 282 m (925 ft)
- Population (2023): 26
  - Density: 2.0/km^{2} (5.3/sq mi)
- Time zone: UTC+01:00 (CET)
  - Summer (DST): UTC+02:00 (CEST)
- INSEE/Postal code: 21312 /21290
- ^{1} French Land Register data, which excludes lakes, ponds, glaciers > 1 km^{2} (0.386 sq mi or 247 acres) and river estuaries.

Gurgy-la-Ville (French pronunciation: [gyʁʒi la vil]) is a commune in the Côte-d'Or department in eastern France.

== Population ==
Historical population
Year	Pop.	±% p.a.
1968	77	—
1975	59	−3.73%
1982	54	−1.26%
1990	45	−2.25%
1999	46	+0.24%
2007	36	−3.02%
2012	37	+0.55%
2017	33	−2.26%
2023	26	−3.90%
Source: INSEE

== See also ==
- Communes of the Côte-d'Or department
