= Les Goulles =

- Commune
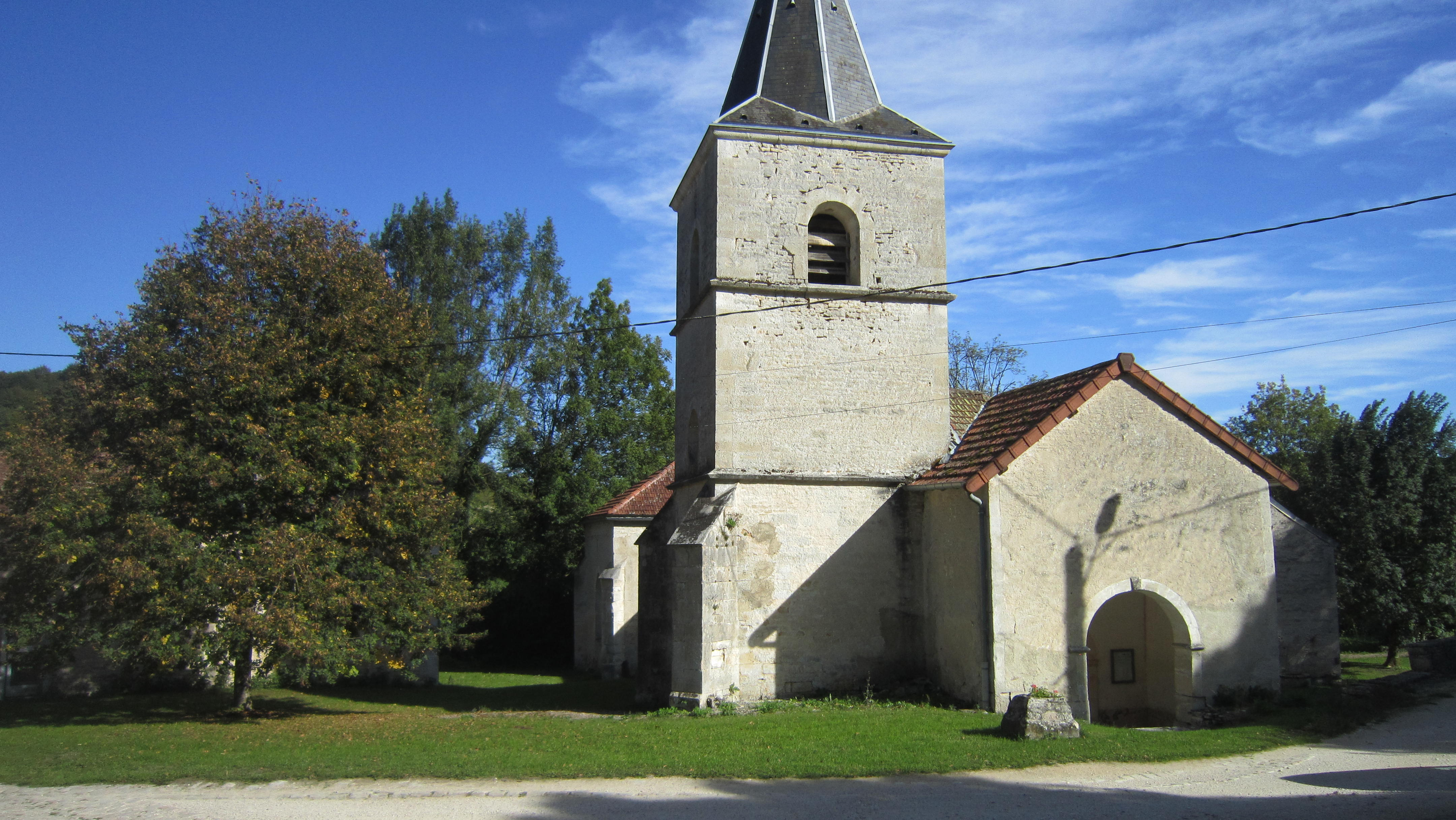
- The church in Les Goulles

- Coat of arms
- Location of Les Goulles
- Location within France Location within Bourgogne-Franche-Comté
- Coordinates: 47°52′57″N 4°54′23″E
- Country: France
- Region: Bourgogne-Franche-Comté
- Department: Côte-d'Or
- Arrondissement: Montbard
- Canton: Châtillon-sur-Seine
- Intercommunality: Pays Châtillonnais

Government
  - Mayor (2020–2026): Denise Jacquinot
- Area^{1}: 8.93 km^{2} (3.45 sq mi)
- Elevation: 279 m (915 ft)
- Highest elevation: 372 m (1,220 ft)
- Lowest elevation: 270 m (890 ft)
- Population (2023): 17
  - Density: 1.9/km^{2} (4.9/sq mi)
- Time zone: UTC+01:00 (CET)
  - Summer (DST): UTC+02:00 (CEST)
- INSEE/Postal code: 21303 /21520
- ^{1} French Land Register data, which excludes lakes, ponds, glaciers > 1 km^{2} (0.386 sq mi or 247 acres) and river estuaries.

Les Goulles (French pronunciation: [le ɡul]) is a commune in the Côte-d'Or department in eastern France.

== Population ==
Historical population
Year	Pop.	±% p.a.
1968	26	—
1975	22	−2.36%
1982	21	−0.66%
1990	19	−1.24%
1999	12	−4.98%
2007	16	+3.66%
2012	18	+2.38%
2017	12	−7.79%
2023	17	+5.98%
Source: INSEE

== See also ==
- Communes of the Côte-d'Or department
