= Duesme =

- Commune
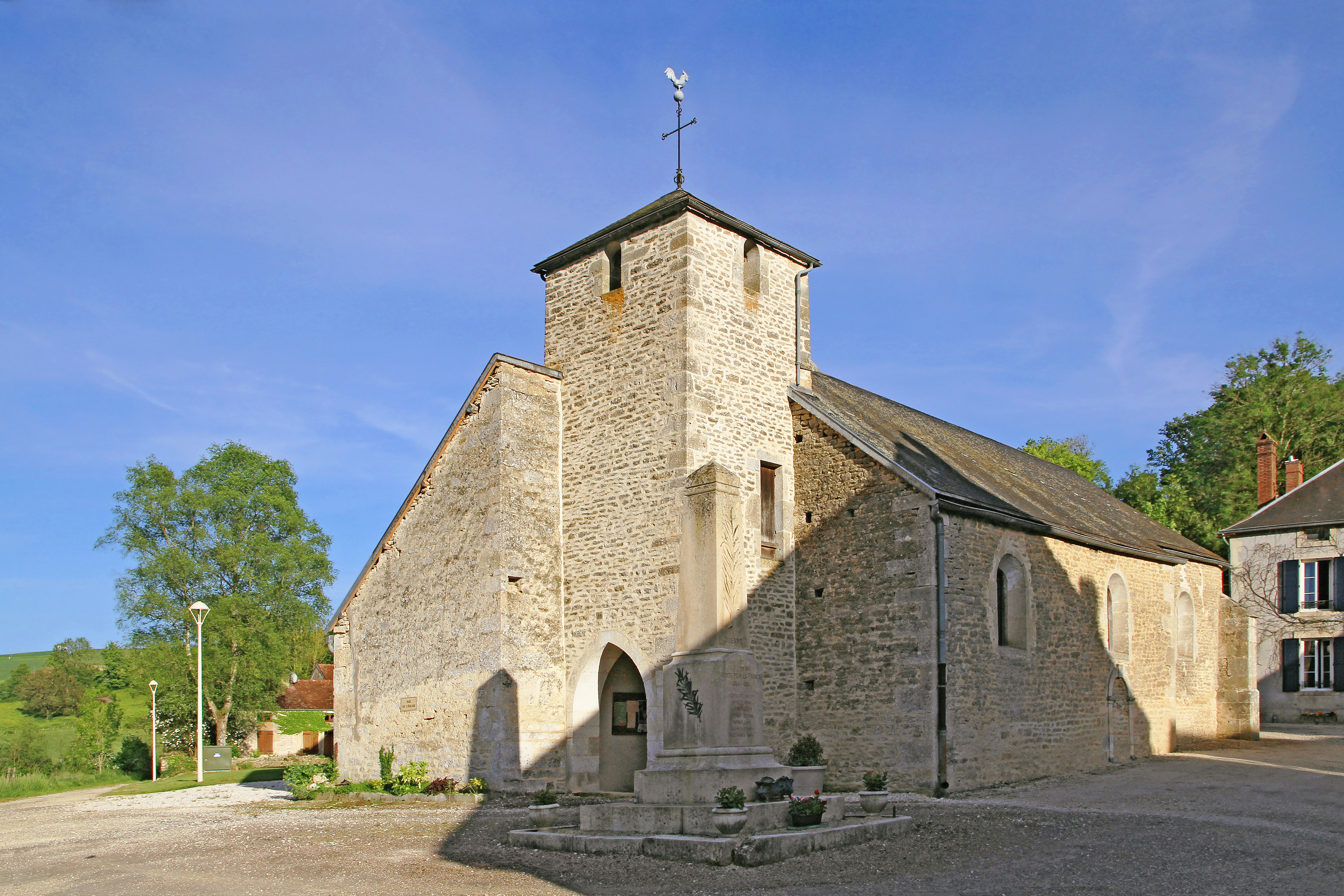
- The church in Duesme

- Coat of arms
- Location of Duesme
- Location within France Location within Bourgogne-Franche-Comté
- Coordinates: 47°38′38″N 4°41′04″E
- Country: France
- Region: Bourgogne-Franche-Comté
- Department: Côte-d'Or
- Arrondissement: Montbard
- Canton: Châtillon-sur-Seine
- Intercommunality: Pays Châtillonnais

Government
  - Mayor (2020–2026): Bernard Mongenet
- Area^{1}: 13.33 km^{2} (5.15 sq mi)
- Elevation: 308 m (1,010 ft)
- Highest elevation: 424 m (1,391 ft)
- Lowest elevation: 303 m (994 ft)
- Population (2023): 46
  - Density: 3.5/km^{2} (8.9/sq mi)
- Time zone: UTC+01:00 (CET)
  - Summer (DST): UTC+02:00 (CEST)
- INSEE/Postal code: 21235 /21510
- ^{1} French Land Register data, which excludes lakes, ponds, glaciers > 1 km^{2} (0.386 sq mi or 247 acres) and river estuaries.

Duesme (French pronunciation: [dɥɛm]) is a commune in the Côte-d'Or department in eastern France.

== Population ==
Historical population
Year	Pop.	±% p.a.
1968	87	—
1975	67	−3.66%
1982	47	−4.94%
1990	55	+1.98%
1999	57	+0.40%
2007	62	+1.06%
2012	48	−4.99%
2017	53	+2.00%
2023	46	−2.33%
Source: INSEE

== See also ==
- Communes of the Côte-d'Or department
