= Montmoyen =

- Commune
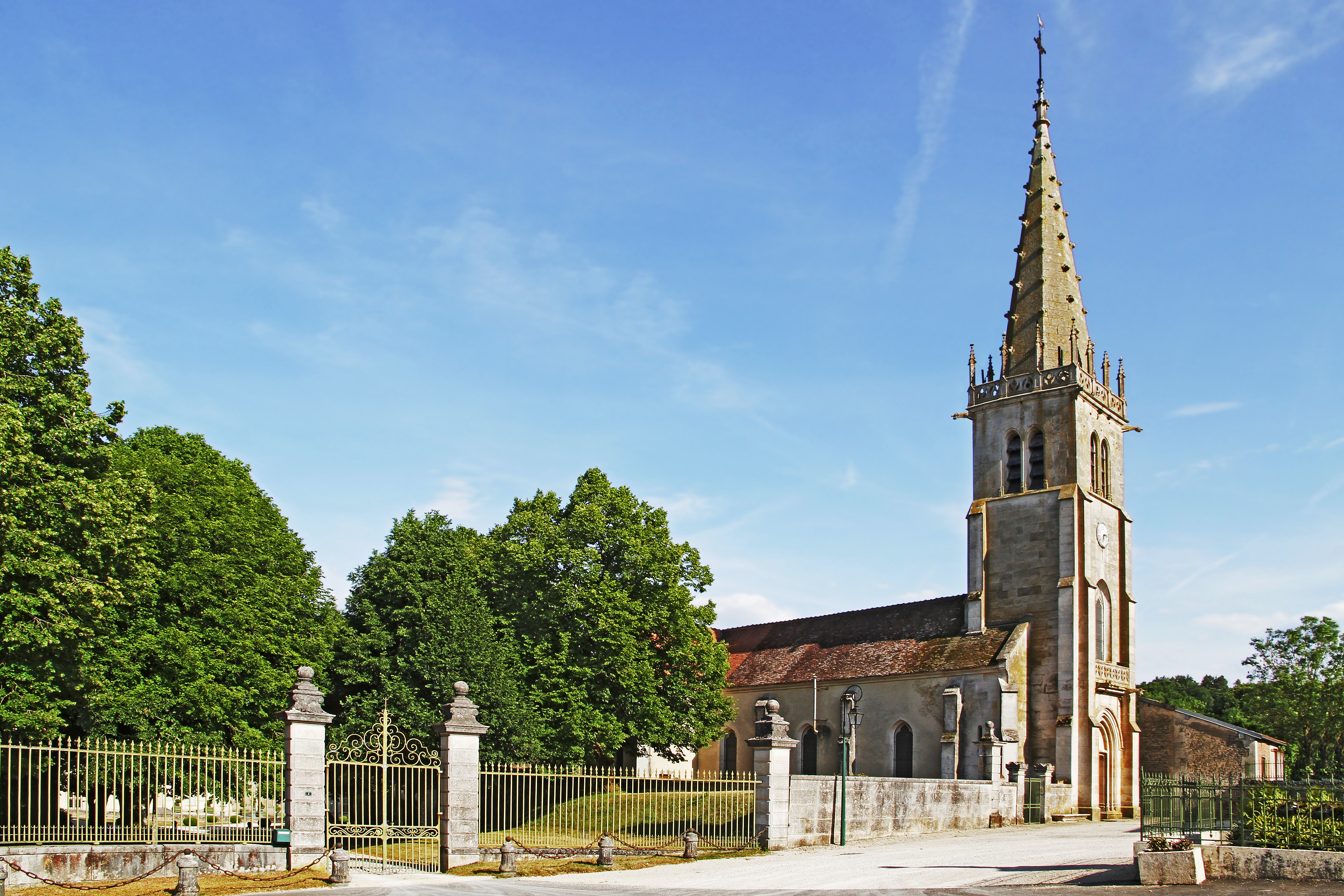
- The church in Montmoyen

- Coat of arms
- Location of Montmoyen
- Location within France Location within Bourgogne-Franche-Comté
- Coordinates: 47°44′03″N 4°47′39″E
- Country: France
- Region: Bourgogne-Franche-Comté
- Department: Côte-d'Or
- Arrondissement: Montbard
- Canton: Châtillon-sur-Seine
- Intercommunality: Pays Châtillonnais

Government
  - Mayor (2020–2026): Eric Ramousse
- Area^{1}: 19.2 km^{2} (7.4 sq mi)
- Elevation: 320 m (1,050 ft)
- Highest elevation: 437 m (1,434 ft)
- Lowest elevation: 297 m (974 ft)
- Population (2023): 71
  - Density: 3.7/km^{2} (9.6/sq mi)
- Time zone: UTC+01:00 (CET)
  - Summer (DST): UTC+02:00 (CEST)
- INSEE/Postal code: 21438 /21290
- ^{1} French Land Register data, which excludes lakes, ponds, glaciers > 1 km^{2} (0.386 sq mi or 247 acres) and river estuaries.

Montmoyen (French pronunciation: [mɔ̃mwajɛ̃]) is a commune in the Côte-d'Or department in eastern France.

== Population ==
Historical population
Year	Pop.	±% p.a.
1968	126	—
1975	100	−3.25%
1982	109	+1.24%
1990	103	−0.71%
1999	103	+0.00%
2007	85	−2.37%
2012	91	+1.37%
2017	78	−3.04%
2023	71	−1.55%
Source: INSEE

== See also ==
- Communes of the Côte-d'Or department
