= Bissey-la-Côte =

- Commune
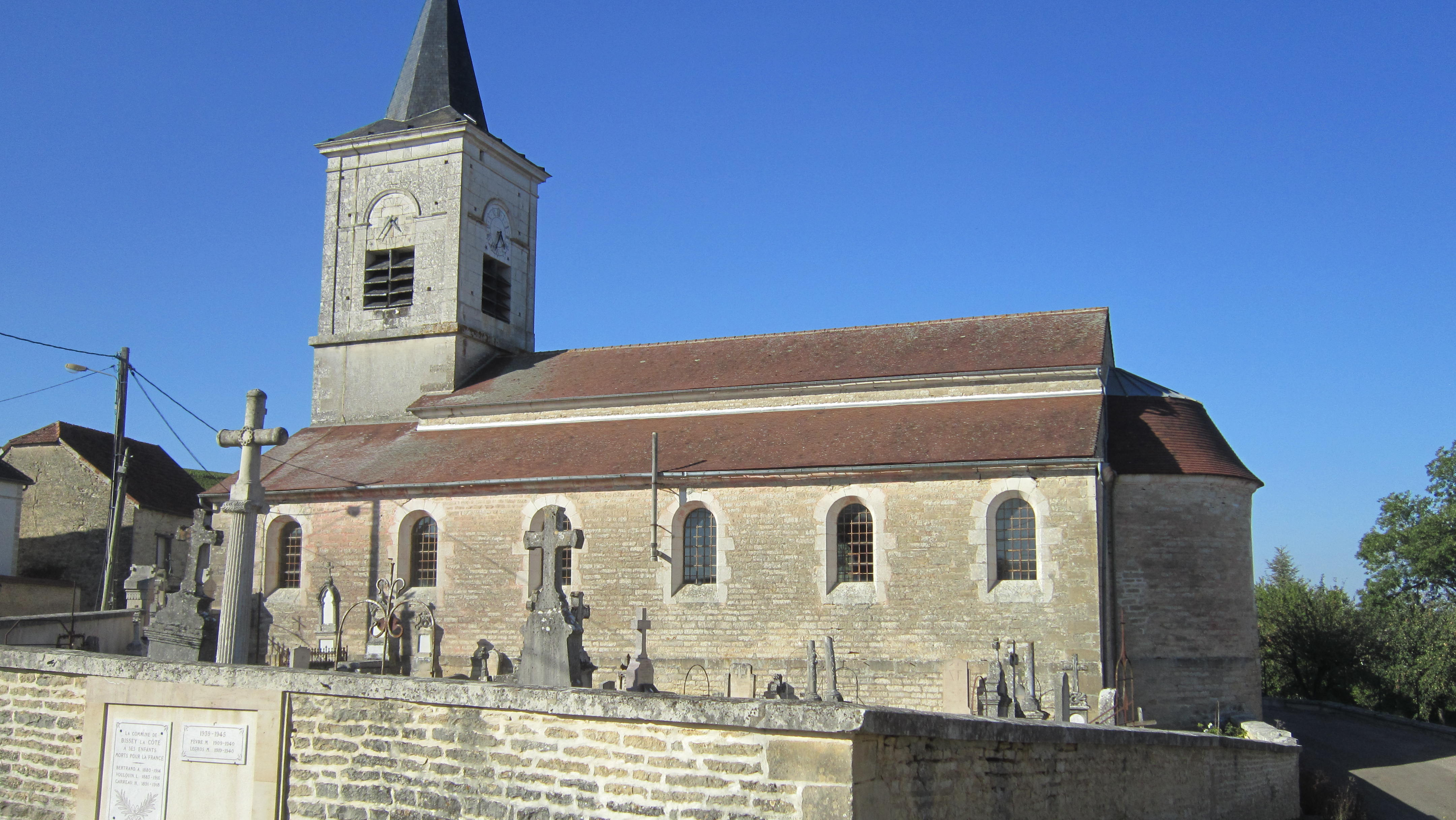
- The church in Bissey-la-Côte

- Coat of arms
- Location of Bissey-la-Côte
- Location within France Location within Bourgogne-Franche-Comté
- Coordinates: 47°54′49″N 4°42′39″E
- Country: France
- Region: Bourgogne-Franche-Comté
- Department: Côte-d'Or
- Arrondissement: Montbard
- Canton: Châtillon-sur-Seine
- Intercommunality: Pays Châtillonnais

Government
  - Mayor (2020–2026): Jean-Louis Chaumonnot
- Area^{1}: 19.93 km^{2} (7.70 sq mi)
- Elevation: 271 m (889 ft)
- Highest elevation: 344 m (1,129 ft)
- Lowest elevation: 229 m (751 ft)
- Population (2023): 133
  - Density: 6.67/km^{2} (17.3/sq mi)
- Time zone: UTC+01:00 (CET)
  - Summer (DST): UTC+02:00 (CEST)
- INSEE/Postal code: 21077 /21520
- ^{1} French Land Register data, which excludes lakes, ponds, glaciers > 1 km^{2} (0.386 sq mi or 247 acres) and river estuaries.

Bissey-la-Côte (French pronunciation: [bisɛ la kot]) is a commune in the Côte-d'Or department in eastern France.

== Population ==
Historical population
Year	Pop.	±% p.a.
1968	129	—
1975	134	+0.54%
1982	133	−0.11%
1990	121	−1.18%
1999	120	−0.09%
2007	97	−2.62%
2012	108	+2.17%
2017	124	+2.80%
2023	133	+1.17%
Source: INSEE

== See also ==
- Communes of the Côte-d'Or department
