= Gomméville =

- Commune
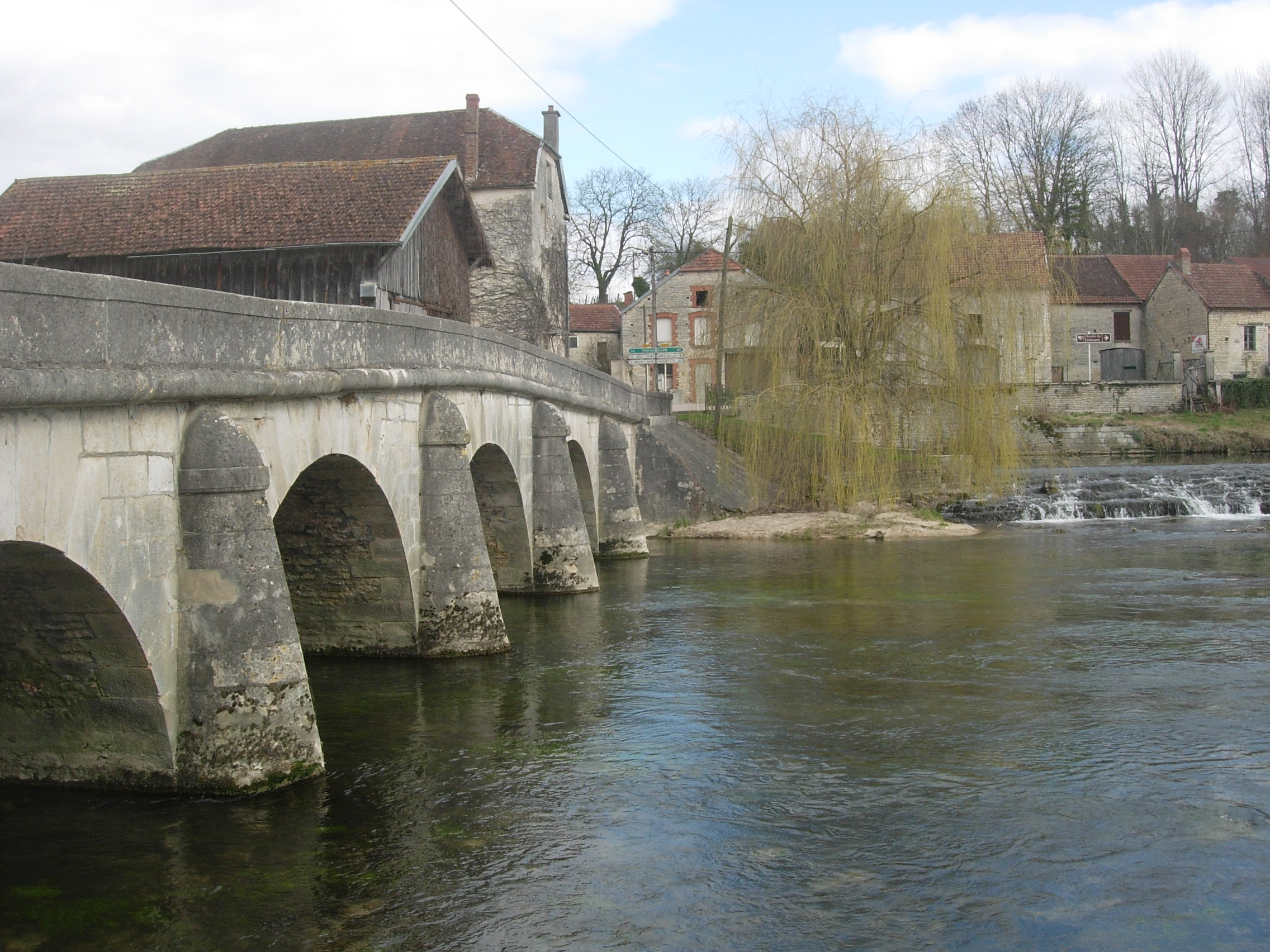
- Bridge over the Seine

- Coat of arms
- Location of Gomméville
- Location within France Location within Bourgogne-Franche-Comté
- Coordinates: 47°57′42″N 4°29′44″E
- Country: France
- Region: Bourgogne-Franche-Comté
- Department: Côte-d'Or
- Arrondissement: Montbard
- Canton: Châtillon-sur-Seine
- Intercommunality: Pays Châtillonnais

Government
  - Mayor (2020–2026): Jean-Paul Rommel
- Area^{1}: 9.83 km^{2} (3.80 sq mi)
- Elevation: 193 m (633 ft)
- Highest elevation: 355 m (1,165 ft)
- Lowest elevation: 189 m (620 ft)
- Population (2023): 110
  - Density: 11/km^{2} (29/sq mi)
- Time zone: UTC+01:00 (CET)
  - Summer (DST): UTC+02:00 (CEST)
- INSEE/Postal code: 21302 /21400
- ^{1} French Land Register data, which excludes lakes, ponds, glaciers > 1 km^{2} (0.386 sq mi or 247 acres) and river estuaries.

Gomméville (French pronunciation: [ɡɔmevil]) is a commune in the Côte-d'Or department in eastern France.

== Population ==
Historical population
Year	Pop.	±% p.a.
1968	198	—
1975	194	−0.29%
1982	161	−2.63%
1990	142	−1.56%
1999	132	−0.81%
2007	145	+1.18%
2012	147	+0.27%
2017	133	−1.98%
2023	110	−3.11%
Source: INSEE

== See also ==
- Communes of the Côte-d'Or department
