= Busseaut =

- Commune
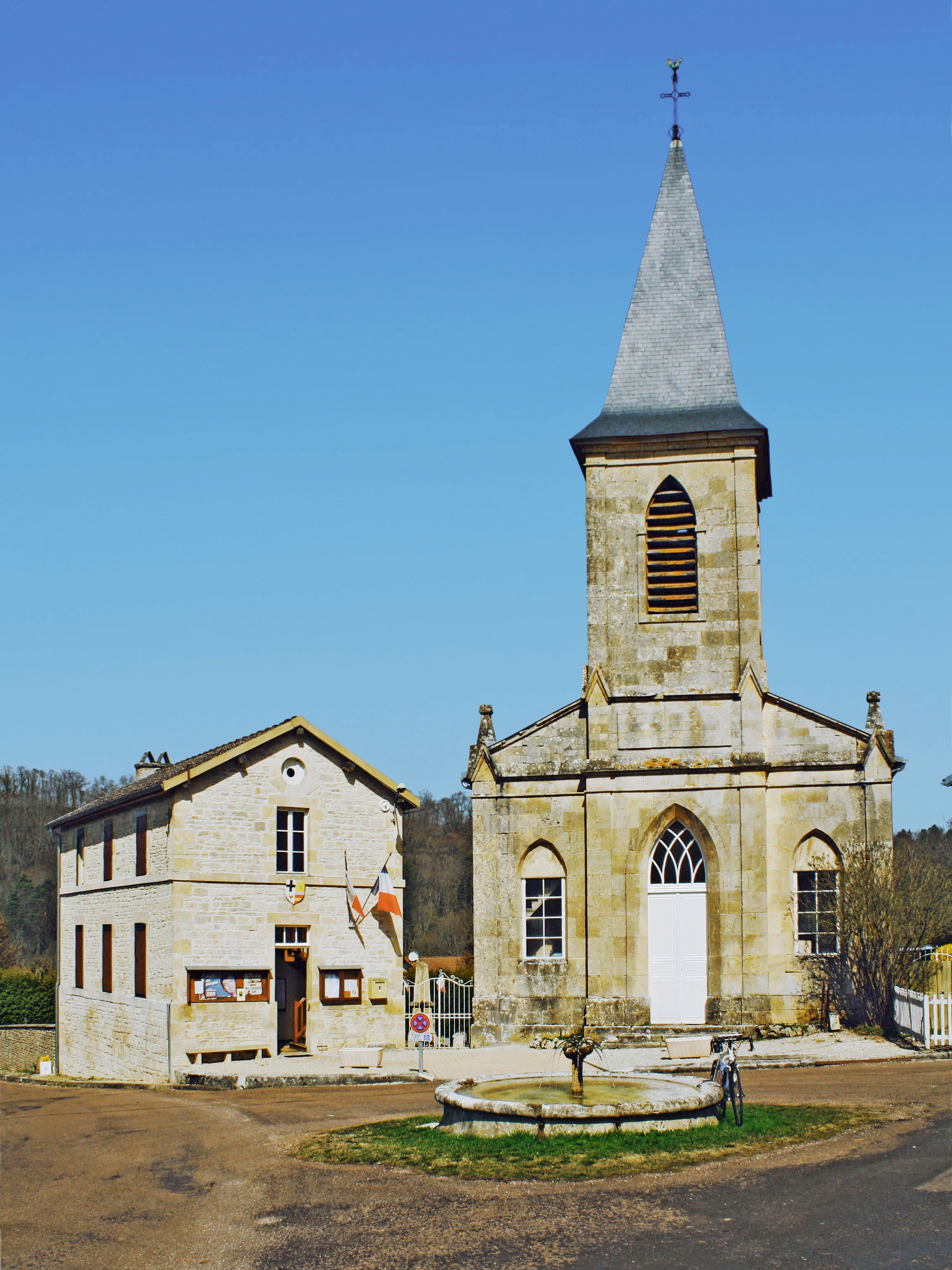
- The church and town hall in Busseaut

- Coat of arms
- Location of Busseaut
- Location within France Location within Bourgogne-Franche-Comté
- Coordinates: 47°44′16″N 4°38′51″E
- Country: France
- Region: Bourgogne-Franche-Comté
- Department: Côte-d'Or
- Arrondissement: Montbard
- Canton: Châtillon-sur-Seine
- Intercommunality: Pays Châtillonnais

Government
  - Mayor (2020–2026): Didier Bredin
- Area^{1}: 10.62 km^{2} (4.10 sq mi)
- Elevation: 237 m (778 ft)
- Highest elevation: 406 m (1,332 ft)
- Lowest elevation: 266 m (873 ft)
- Population (2023): 56
  - Density: 5.3/km^{2} (14/sq mi)
- Time zone: UTC+01:00 (CET)
  - Summer (DST): UTC+02:00 (CEST)
- INSEE/Postal code: 21117 /21510
- ^{1} French Land Register data, which excludes lakes, ponds, glaciers > 1 km^{2} (0.386 sq mi or 247 acres) and river estuaries.

Busseaut (French pronunciation: [byso]) is a commune in the Côte-d'Or department in eastern France.

== Population ==
Historical population
Year	Pop.	±% p.a.
1968	57	—
1975	56	−0.25%
1982	51	−1.33%
1990	60	+2.05%
1999	55	−0.96%
2007	65	+2.11%
2012	57	−2.59%
2017	48	−3.38%
2023	56	+2.60%
Source: INSEE

== See also ==
- Communes of the Côte-d'Or department
