= Épinac coal mine =

Coal mine in Saône-et-Loire, France

Location of the deposit on the map of French coalfields.

The Épinac coal mines are situated in the municipality of Épinac and surrounding areas in the Saône-et-Loire department, within the Bourgogne-Franche-Comté region. Mining operations began in the mid-18th century, covering an area of 3,435 hectares.

In total 70 shafts were created in this mining basin, although only around 10 were directly involved in coal extraction.

Remnants of these industrial activities, such as mine entrances, spoil heaps, railways, ruins, workers' housing, and repurposed buildings, are still present at the beginning of the 21st century. The region continues to be influenced economically, socially, environmentally, and culturally by its mining history.

== Location ==
Map of coal concessions in Burgundy: 1. Sincey-lès-Rouvray / 14. Pully; 2. Polroy / 15. Grandchamp; 3. Chambois / 16. St-Laurent en Brionnais; 4. Épinac basin concessions / 17. Les Moquets; 5. Aubigny-la-Ronce / 18. La Chapelle-sous-Dun; 6. Decize / 19. Montreuillon, Montigny en Morvan and Blismes; 7. Verneuil / 20. Menessaire; 8. Le Creusot / 21. Reclesmes; 9. Other concessions in the Blanzy basin, including Montchanin and Longpendu / 22. Uxeau et Toulon-sur-Arroux; 10. La Dheune / Concessions; 11. Vellerot / Coal indices; 12. Forges / Concession limits; 13. Les Petits Châteaux / Departmental boundaries

The deposit is within the municipality of Épinac and its surrounding areas, in the northern part of the Saône-et-Loire department, within the Bourgogne-Franche-Comté region in eastern France.

The Épinac basin is directly adjacent to the bituminous shale basin of Autun, with the two deposits overlapping and being exploited together at Sully and Saint-Léger-du-Bois.

== Geology ==
The coal, sandstone, and coal shale were formed during the Stephanian period (between 307 and 299 million years ago, in the Lower Carboniferous), and are covered by Permian layers, which include the bituminous shale of Autun. The layers are tilted in a northeast-southwest orientation.

Extent of the coalfield in the department of Saône-et-Loire.

== History ==
=== The modest beginnings ===
Discovered in the mid-18th century, the Épinac mine was identified by a prospector, François Rozan, who began its exploitation at Résille, near Épinac, after receiving permission from the intendant of Burgundy in 1754. However, the Count of Clermont-Tonnerre, lord of Épinac, claimed ownership of the deposit through a ruling from the Council on January 28, 1755, which resulted in Rozan being dispossessed. The Count then enlisted mining engineer Mathieu, who constructed lime and brick kilns to process the coal extracted from the mine and a glassworks that produced bottles for local wines. Despite these efforts, the operation was poorly managed and was subsequently leased to the Mozer brothers for ten years. Several farmers or managers, including Claudon, Schmidt, and Jandart, were appointed attempting to make the operation profitable.

Mining activities began in 1774 at the Ouche shaft. Initially, the coal was transported by miners in baskets, using candles and oil lamps for light. Later, wheelbarrows were introduced as coal transport. The concession was granted in 1805.

When the Count of Clermont-Tonnerre was dispossessed during the Revolution, the concession was granted for 50 years to the Mozer brothers by decree on 25 Thermidor, Year XIII (August 13, 1805). The concession became perpetual under the 1810 law. Due to insufficient resources, the Mozers transferred the operation to Jacques-Nazaire Piotet, a former master surgeon who had become a health officer. Between 1822 and 1825, operations were suspended.

In 1826 Piotet sold the concession and its assets, including the glassworks, its dependencies, and the movable property of the château, to the company "Samuel Blum and Sons." On November 20, 1826, the "Société en commandite pour l’exploitation de la houillère d’Épinac autrement dite de Résille, commune d’Épinac" was established. This marked the beginning of industrial coal extraction in the Épinac mines, which remained operational until 1934.

=== Development ===
The municipality of Épinac (sometimes referred to as Épinac-les-Mines) is linked to the history of one of France's first railways. This railway was authorized in 1830, following the initiative of Samuel Blum, the owner of the Épinac mines, who succeeded Jacques-Nazaire Piotet.

In 1826 the assets of the count (who had emigrated) were sold and acquired by Samuel Blum, a master of forges from Dijon. In 1850, the "S.A. Houillères et du chemin de fer d'Épinac" was established.

In 1829 the "Compagnie des houillères et du chemin de fer d’Épinac" was established for this purpose, owning four concessions (Moloy, Sully, Pauvray and Épinac) covering a total of 7,031 hectares. The company remained the owner until nationalization in 1946.

From 1829 to 1933 seventy shafts were dug in the mining basin, but only about ten were involved in coal extraction.

A railway was put into service in 1836 to transport coal to Pont-d'Ouche for shipment via the Burgundy Canal.

With Charles Destival's arrival as director in 1899, the mines entered a period of prosperity. While production was 1,500 tons in 1838 with 150 workers, it reached 191,500 tons in 1913 with 1,215 workers. In 1905, the Académie des Sciences Morales et Politiques awarded the Audéoud prize to the Épinac company for implementing profit-sharing in 1902.

In 1920 activity intensified, and the Saint-Charles shaft was sunk. By 1928, production had reached 250,000 tons of coal.

=== Crisis and decline ===
From 1929 onward, coal extraction became increasingly difficult, and the industry was affected by the economic crisis.

During World War II, the shortage of fuels prompted the government to adopt a policy of developing national production. The Société des Schistes Bitumineux d'Autun received state support, and to maximize production, it was required to acquire rights to use a coal mine. In the Épinac basin, only the Moloy mine had sufficient resources for further exploitation. A decree on April 1, 1944, split the Sully concession into two: the northern part, adjacent to the Moloy concession, was named Saint-Léger du Bois, and the southern part was named Veuvrottes. The Saint-Léger du Bois and Moloy concessions were transferred to the Société Minière des Schistes bitumineux d’Autun, which had substantial fuel needs.

Decree no. 46-1570 of June 28, 1946, which established the Blanzy Mining Museum, provided for the transfer of the assets of the Société des Houillères et du chemin de fer d'Épinac to the new entity.

The shafts closed one by one. The Pauvray mine closed on December 31, 1949. The non-nationalized Moloy mine closed in 1950, and the last shaft of the Épinac coal mine, the Veuvrottes shaft (in the municipality of Sully), was definitively shut down on February 28, 1966.

== Épinac shaft ==
=== La Garenne shaft ===
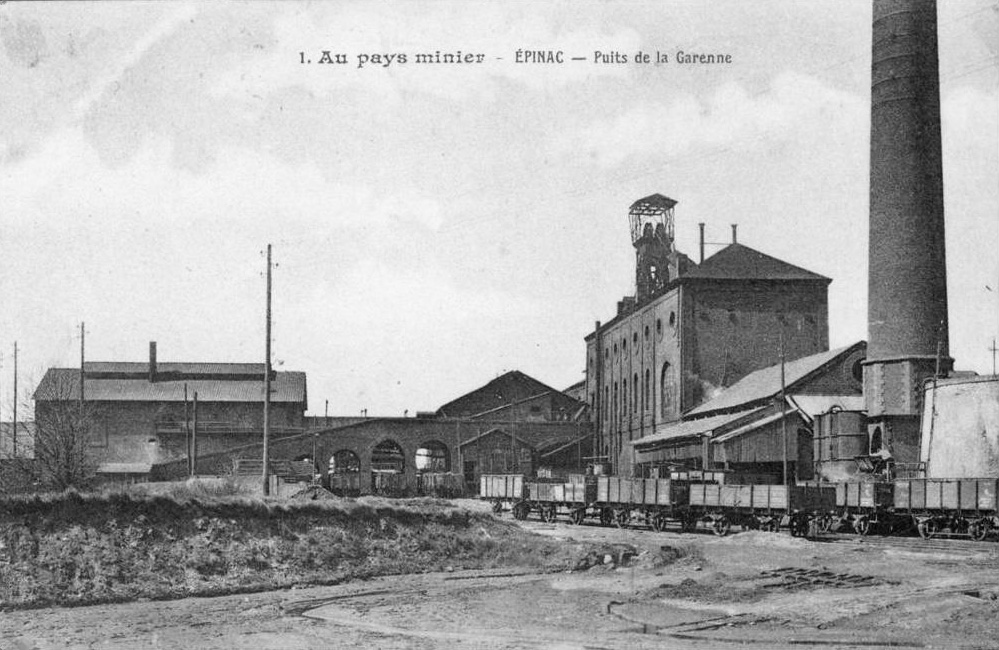
La Garenne shaft

46°9′01″N 4°31′15″E

La Garenne shaft was sunk starting in 1837 and continued its extraction until 1942. Around 1880, the shaft was deepened to 475 meters to create a fourth level of exploitation. On the surface, the old 90-horsepower steam engine was replaced by a new two-cylinder vertical engine with a power of 200 horsepower, equipped with seven boilers.

Around 1910 a fire destroyed the wooden headgear, which was subsequently replaced by a taller metal headgear.

Remains of the La Garenne Shaft

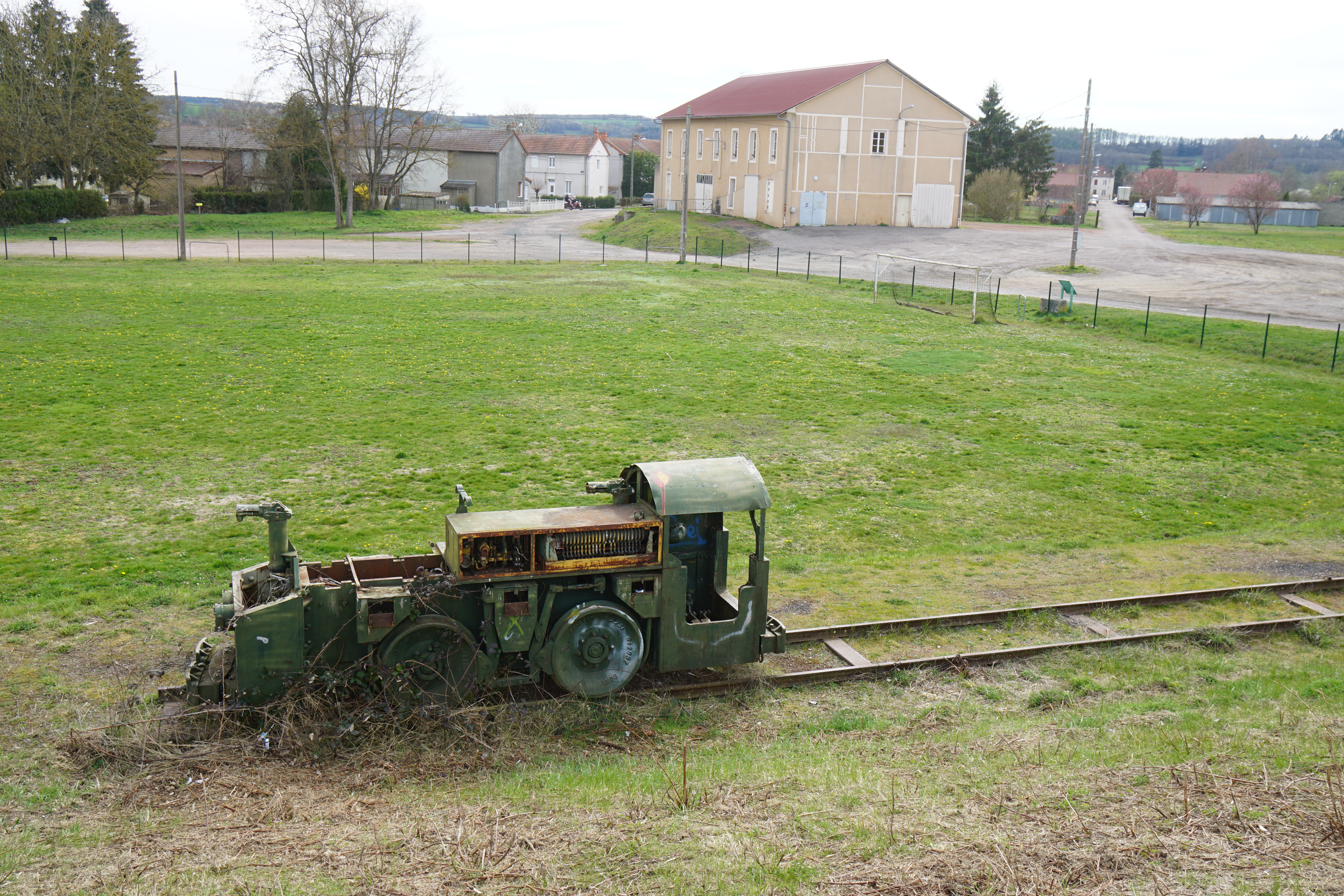
Location of the shaft.

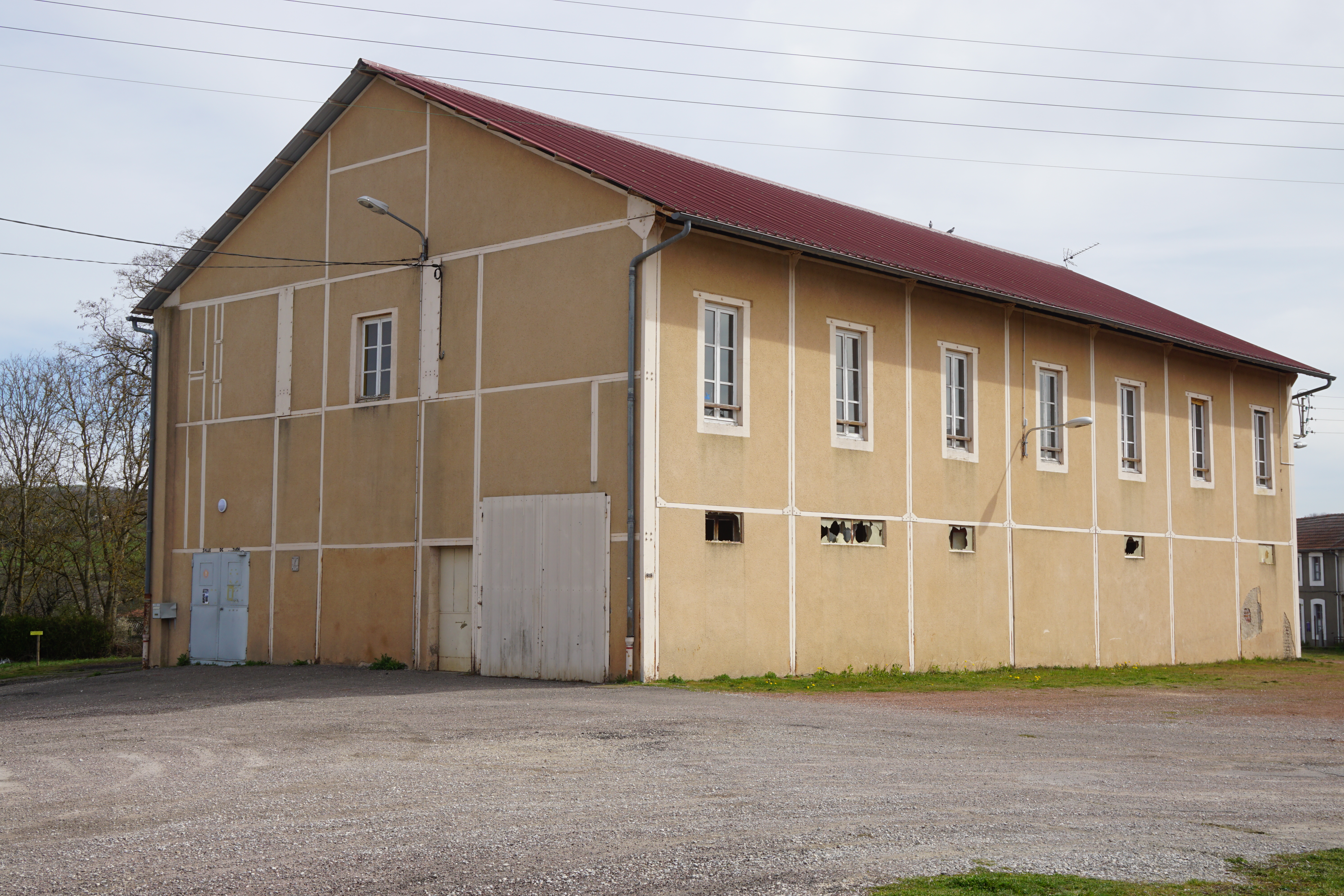
Last remaining building of the mining complex.

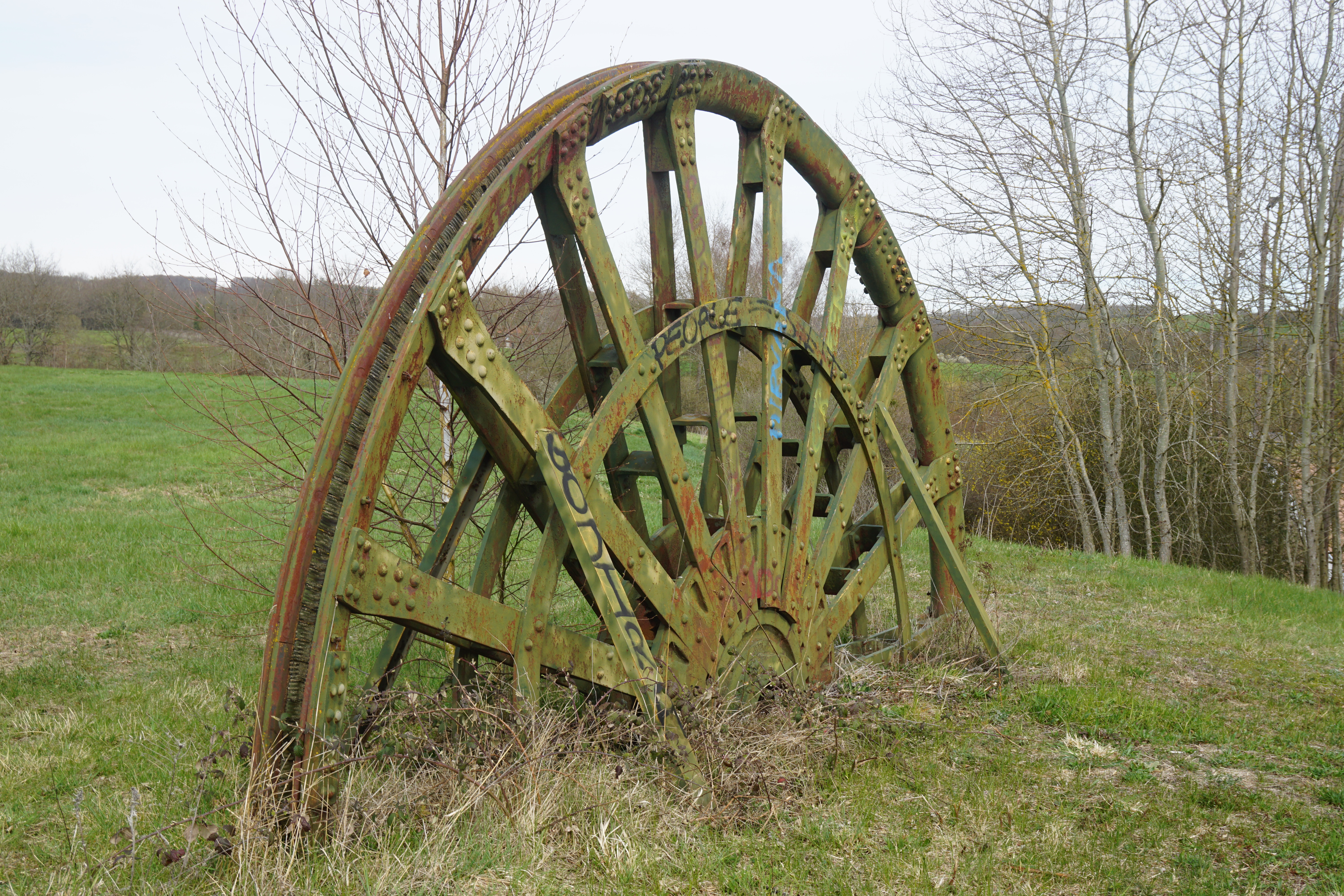
Molette (coal roller).

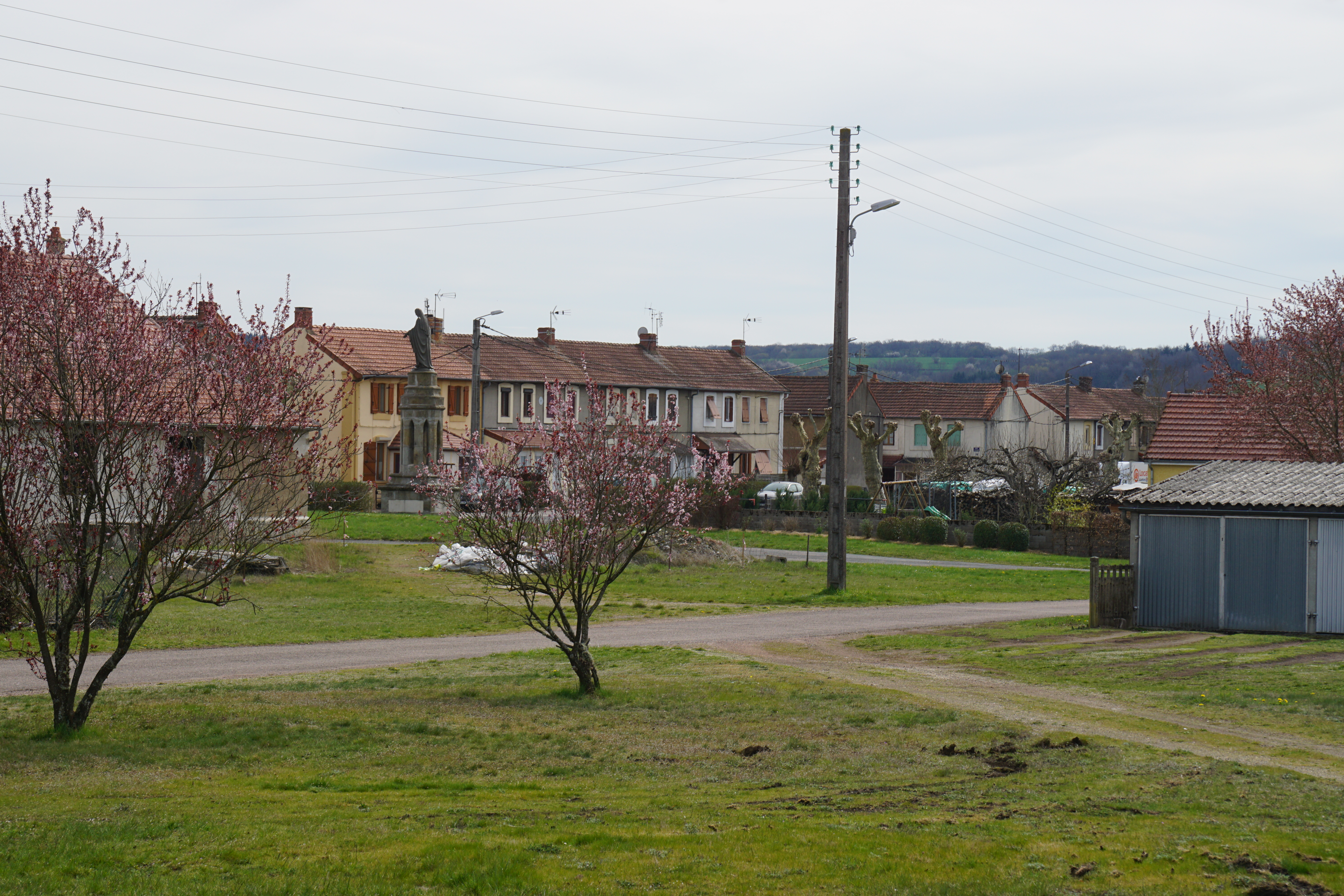
The Garenne workers' housing.

=== Saint-Charles shaft ===
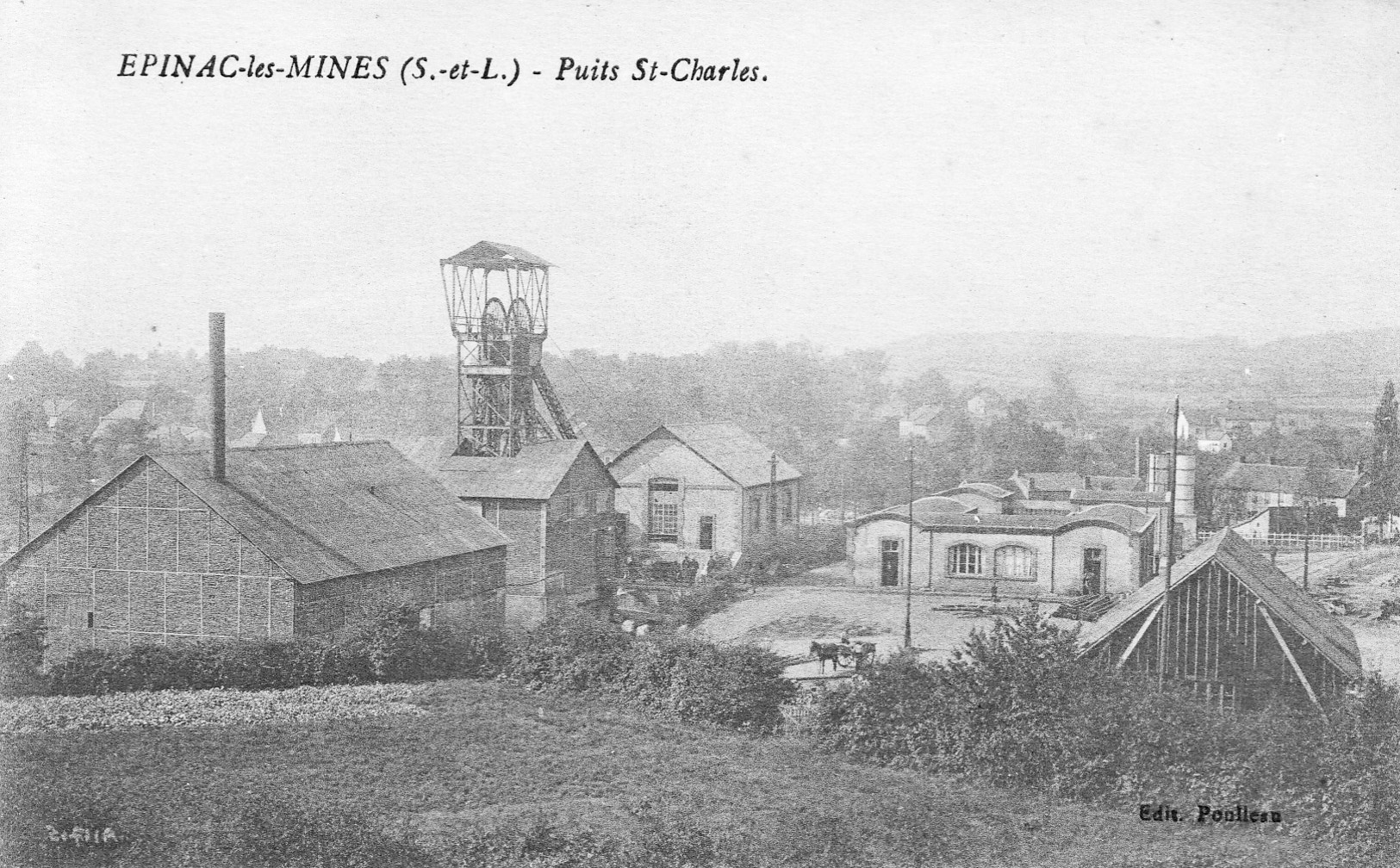
Saint-Charles shaft

46°59′03″N 4°32′19″E

The Saint-Charles shaft was sunk in 1920 to a depth of 618 meters and was named after the director, Mr. Destival.

The headframe of the Saint-Charles shaft was relocated to the mining museum in Blanzy. Two well-preserved buildings remain standing and are currently used by a company.

Remains of the Saint-Charles shaft

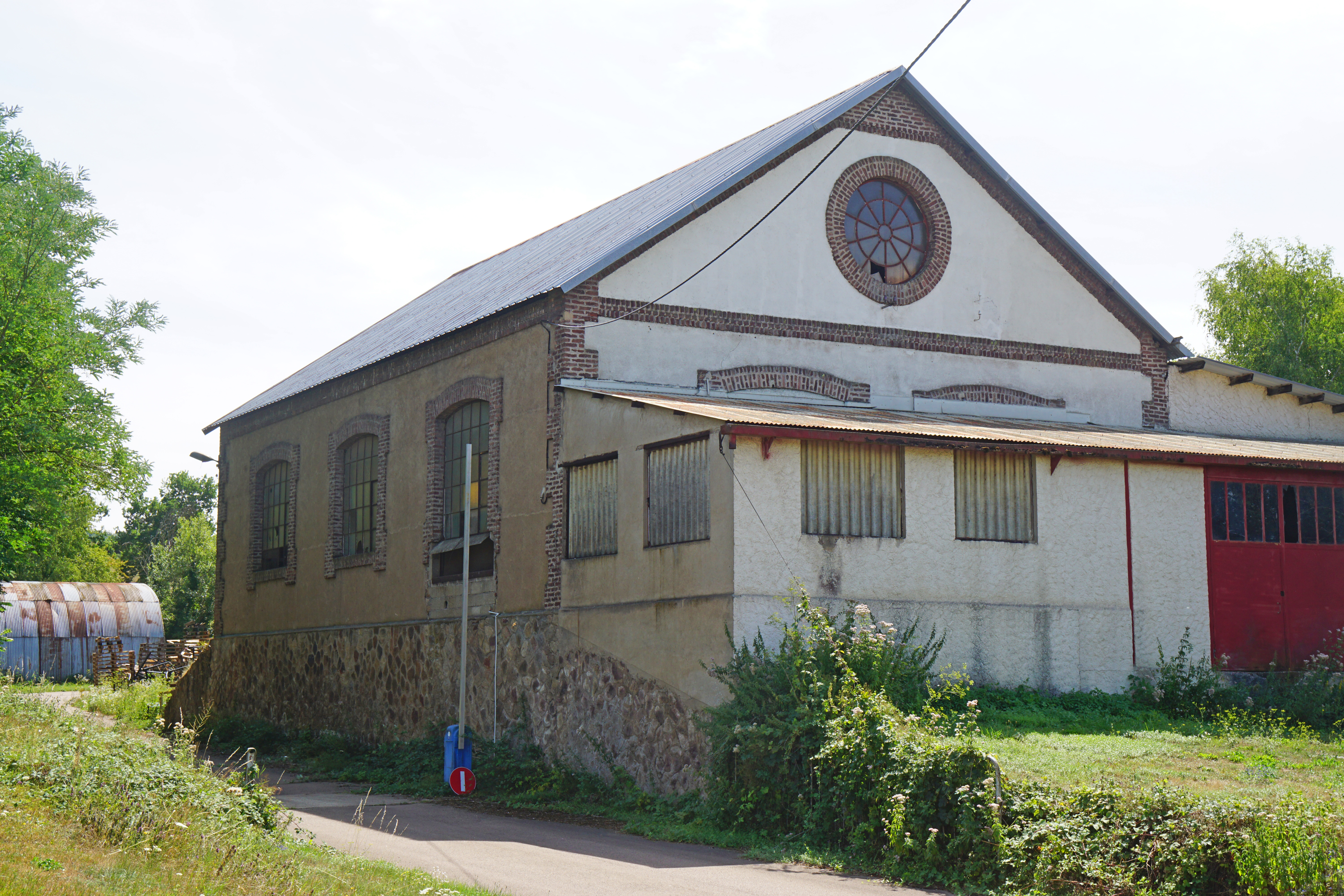
Extraction machine building.

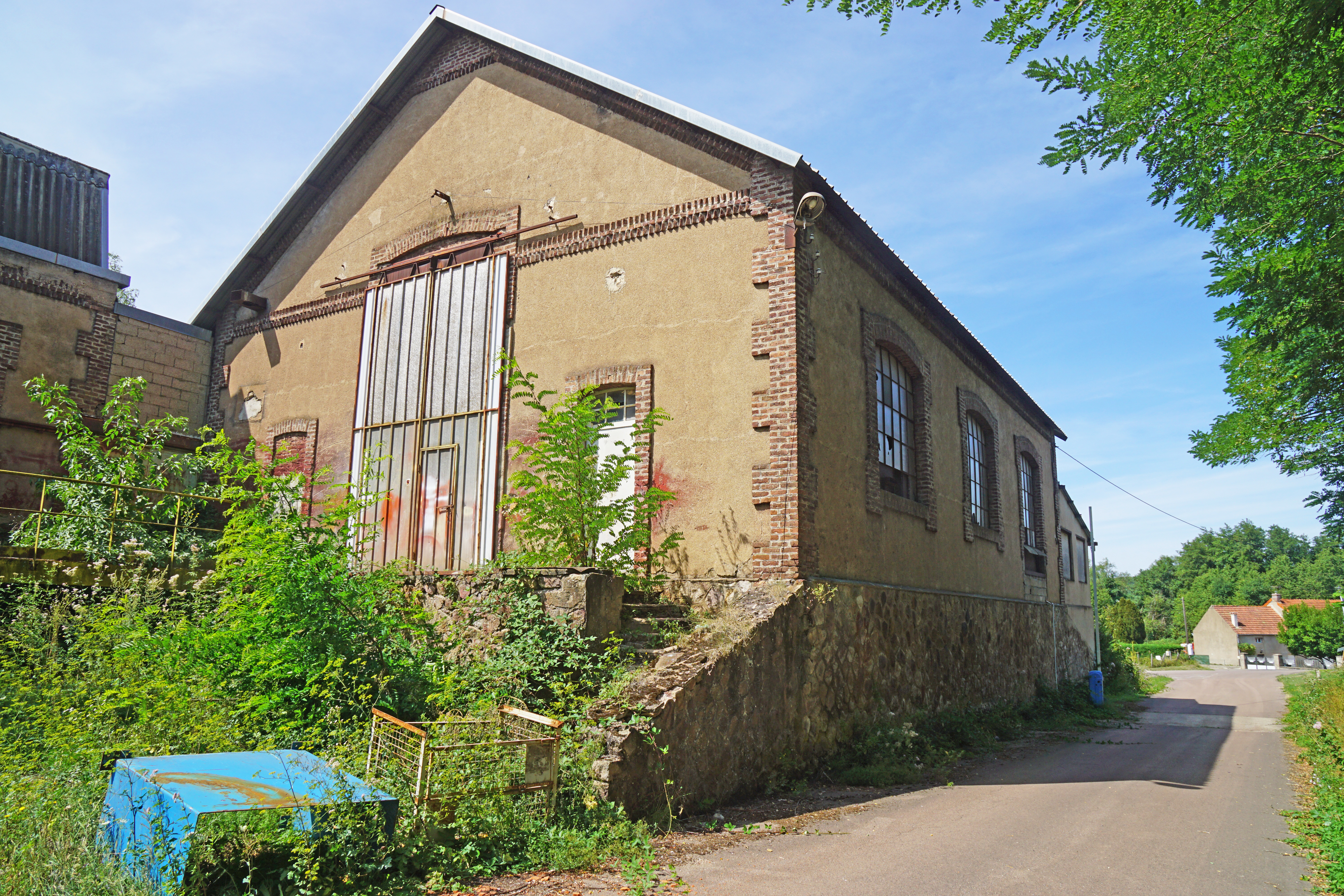
Another facade.

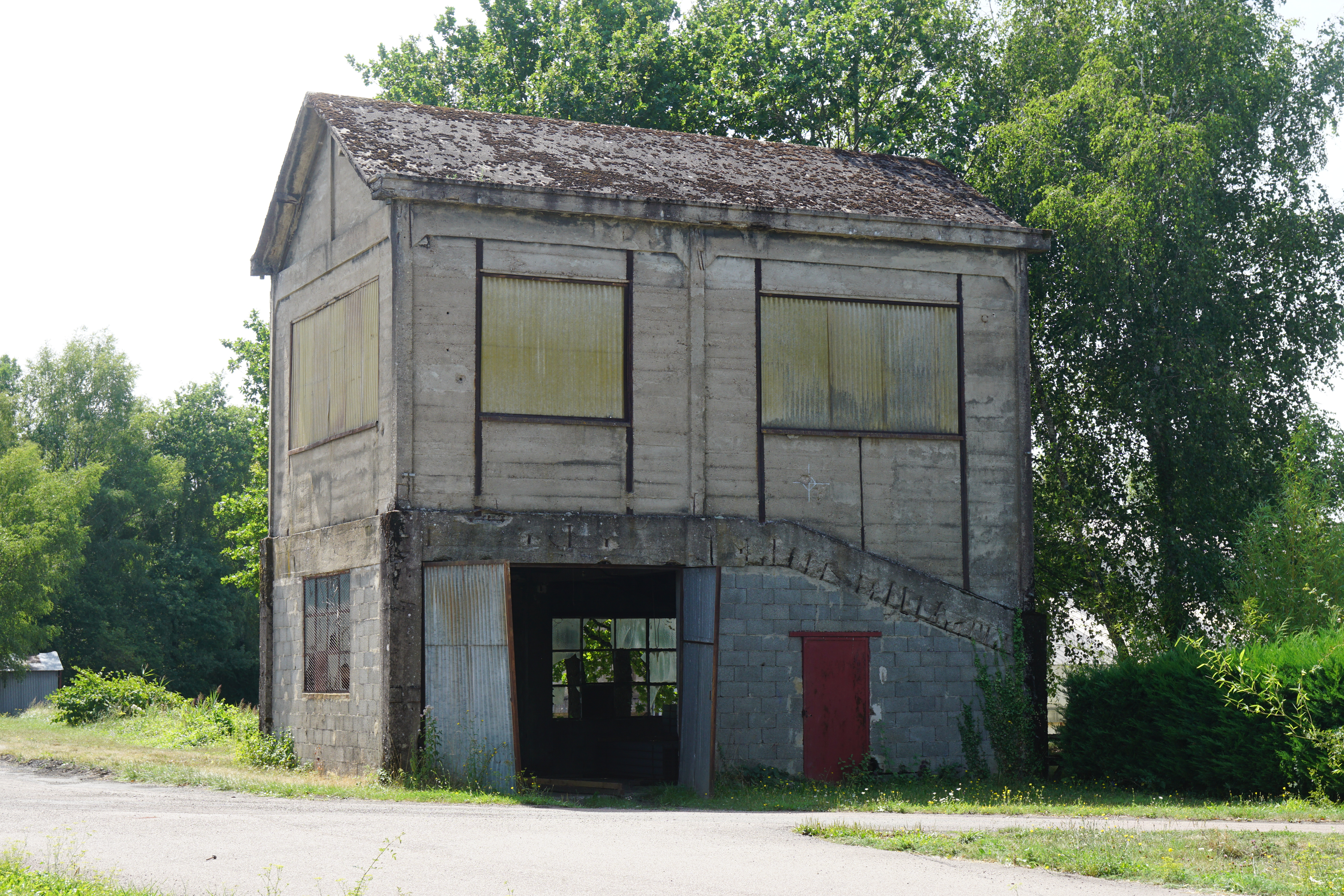
Hopper building.

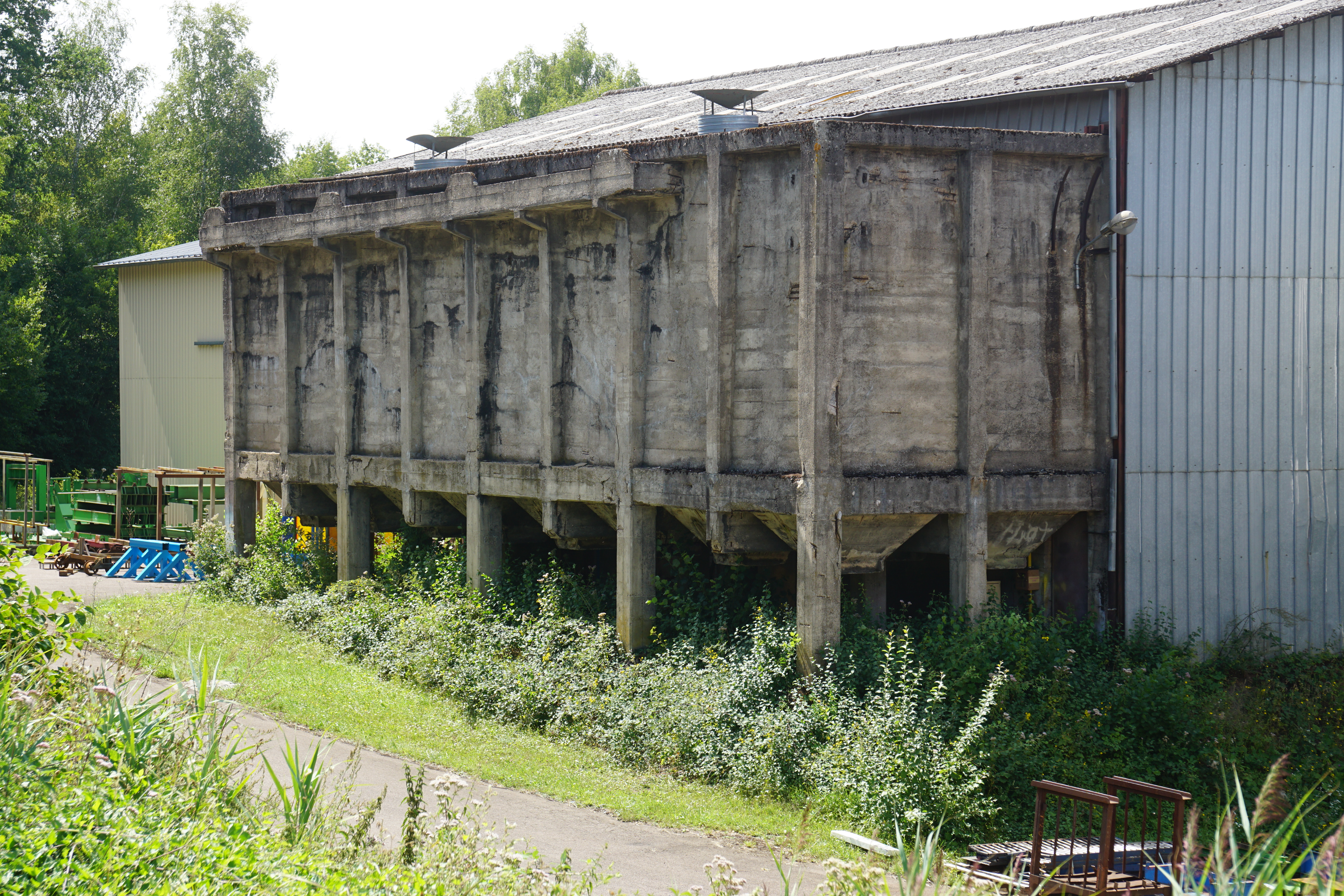
Hoppers.

=== Fontaine-Bonnard shaft ===
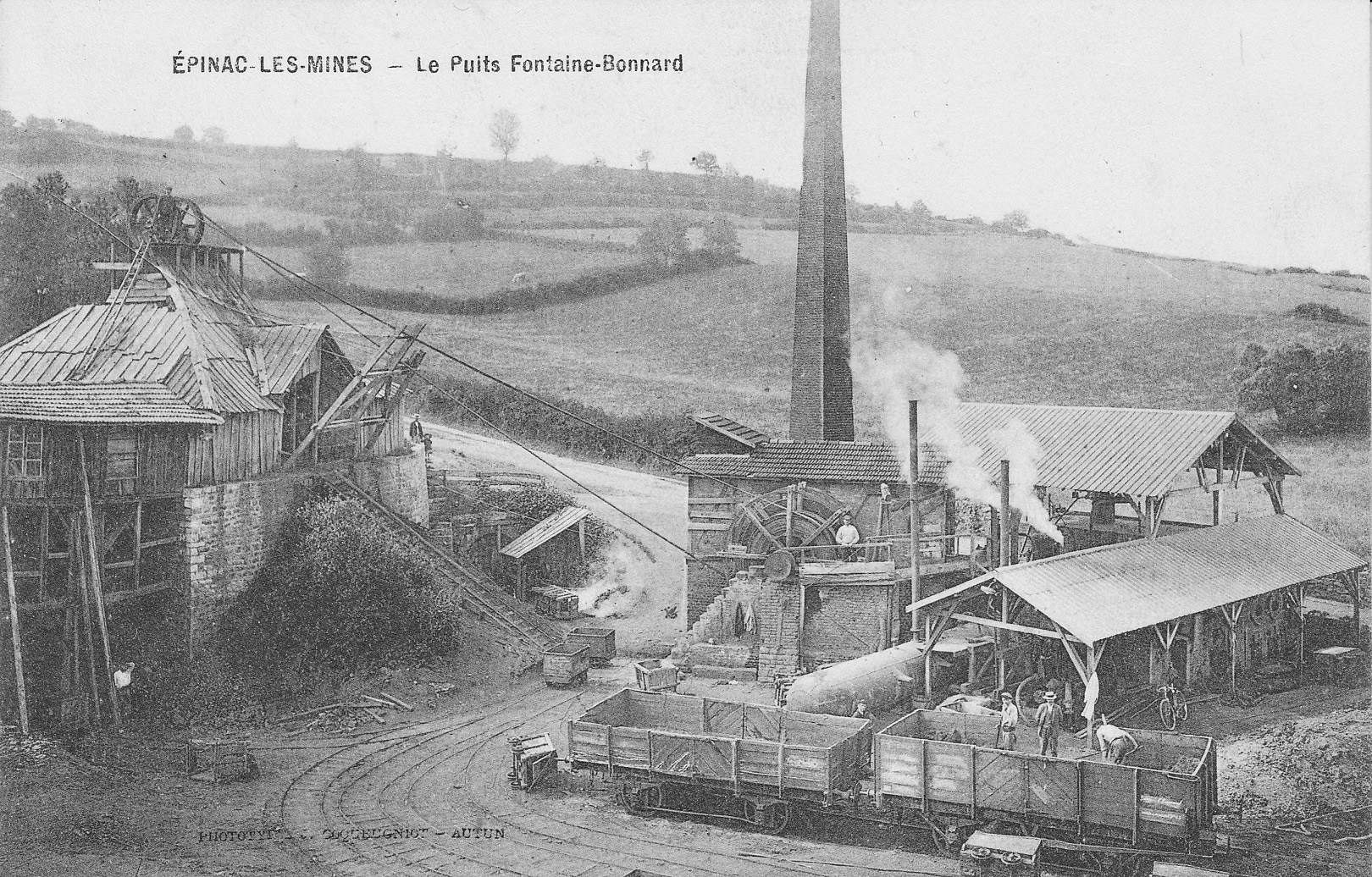
Fontaine-Bonnard shaft

46°59′21″N 4°32′34″E

The Fontaine-Bonnard shaft reached a depth of 106 meters and was in operation from 1826 to 1928.

Remains of the Fontaine-Bonnard shaft:

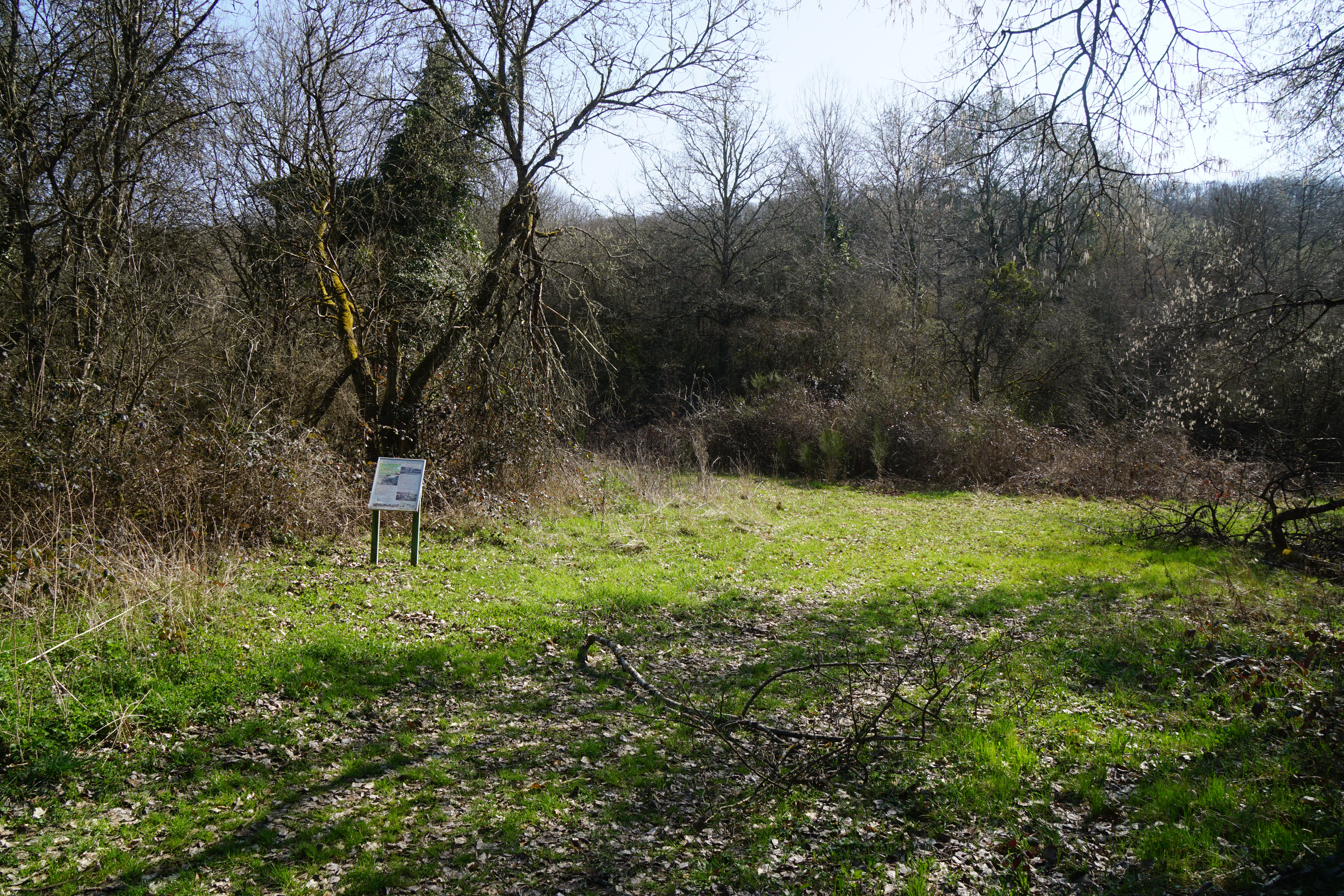
Site of the shaft.

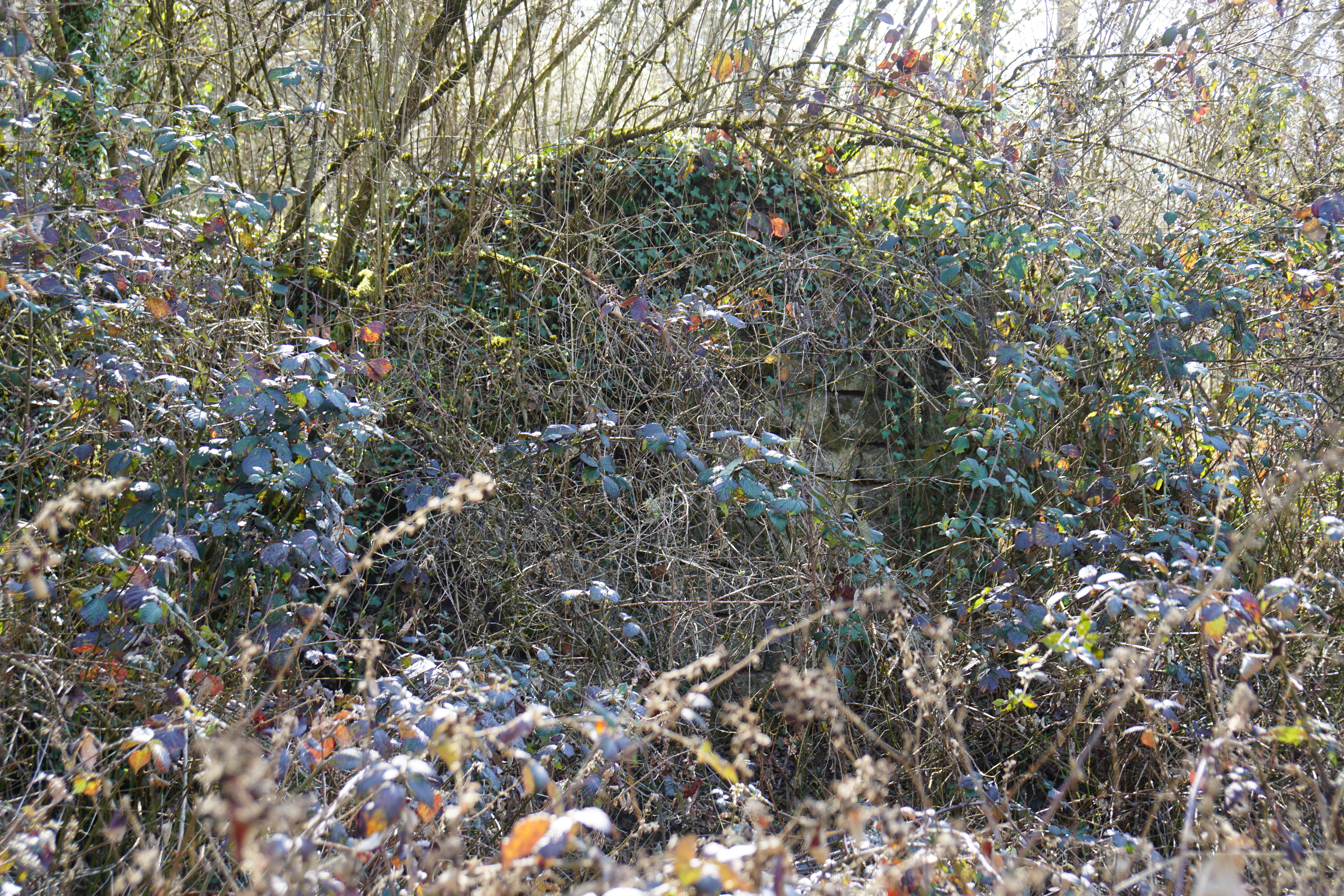
Ruins of the loading building.

=== Curier shaft ===
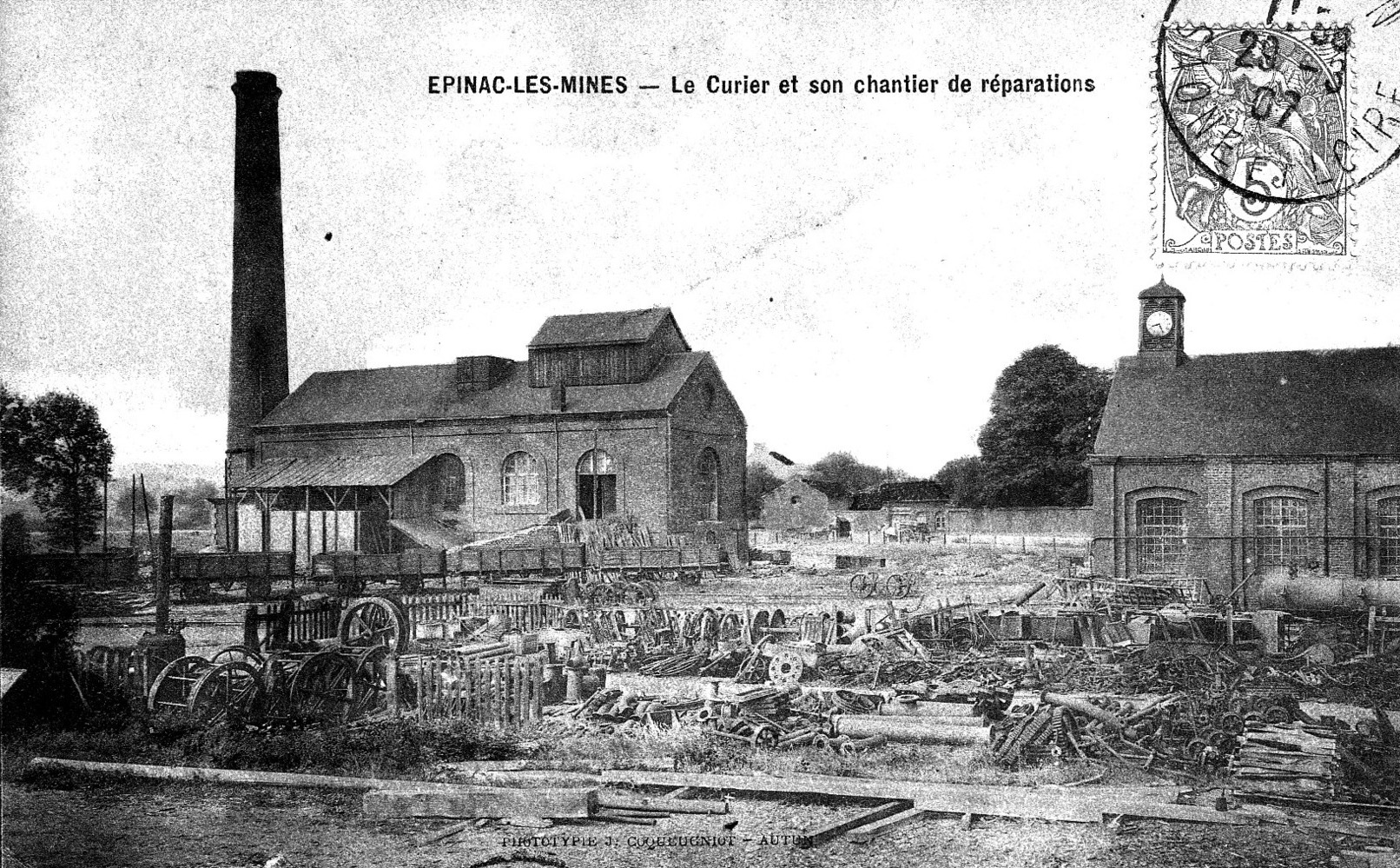
Curier shaft

46°55′05″N 4°32′26″E

The Curier shaft was sunk in 1826 to a depth of 300 meters. In addition to coal extraction, the shaft also provided ventilation and mine services. The mine closed in 1942 and the buildings still stand.

Remains of the Curier shaft

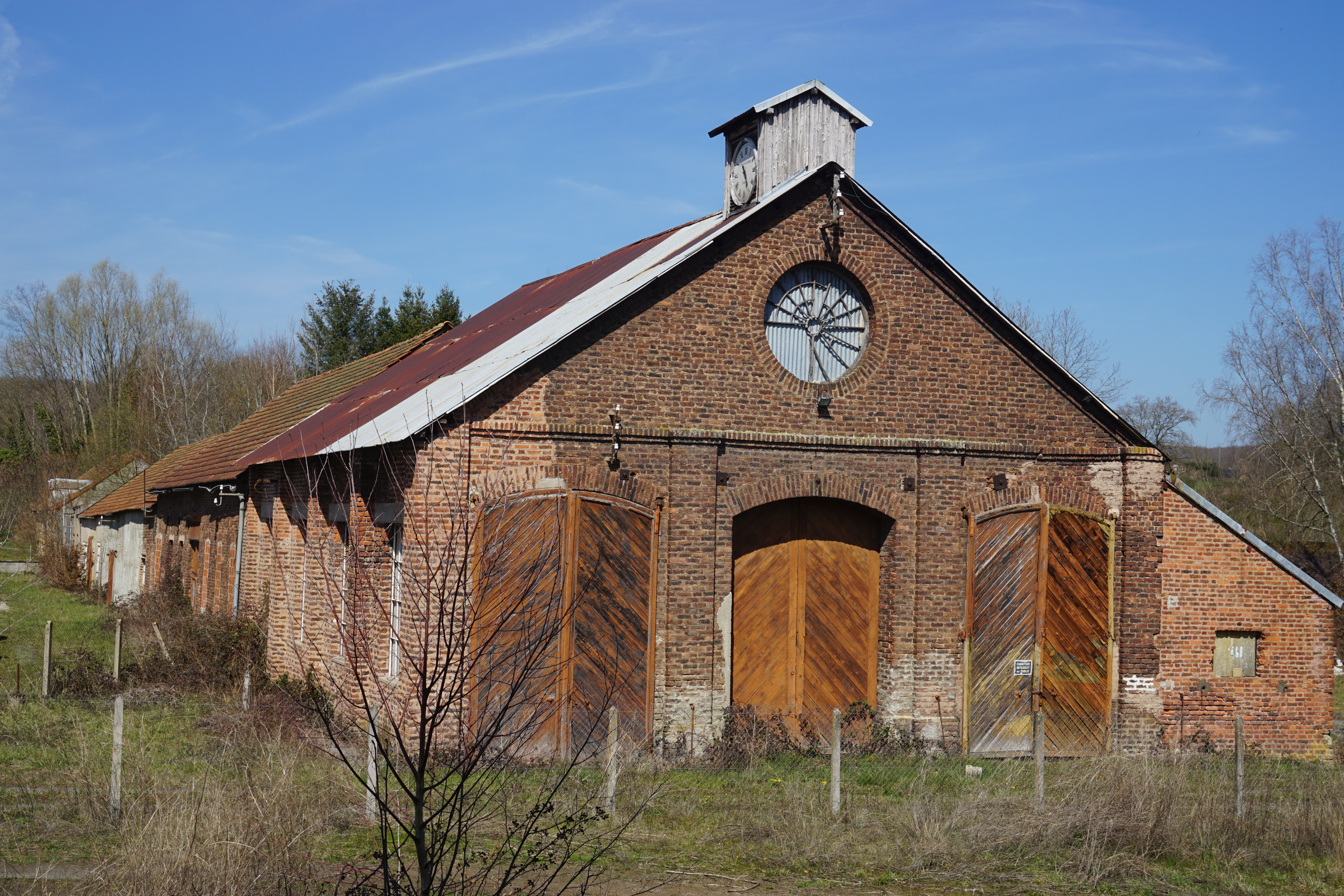
Workshop building.

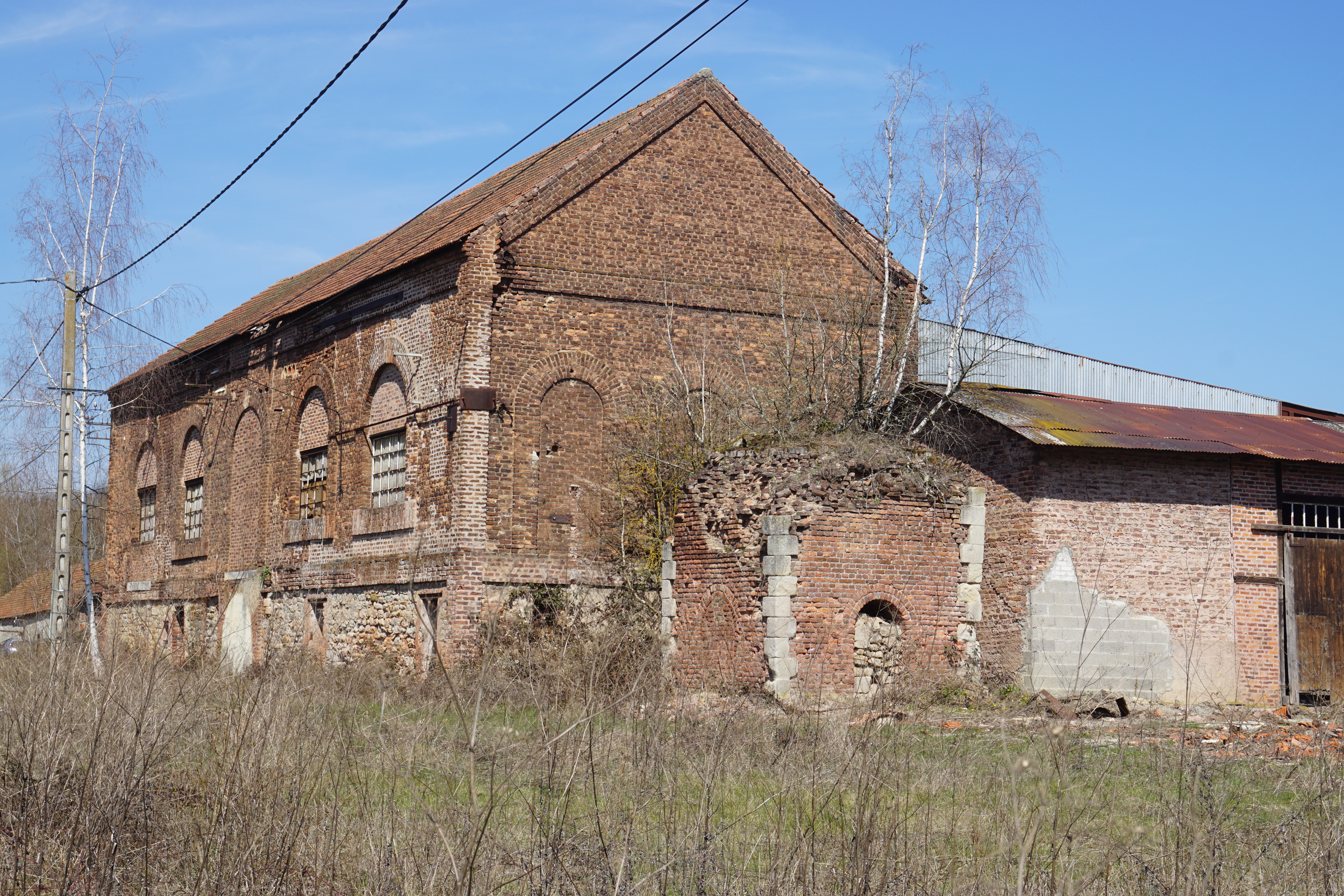
Extraction building.

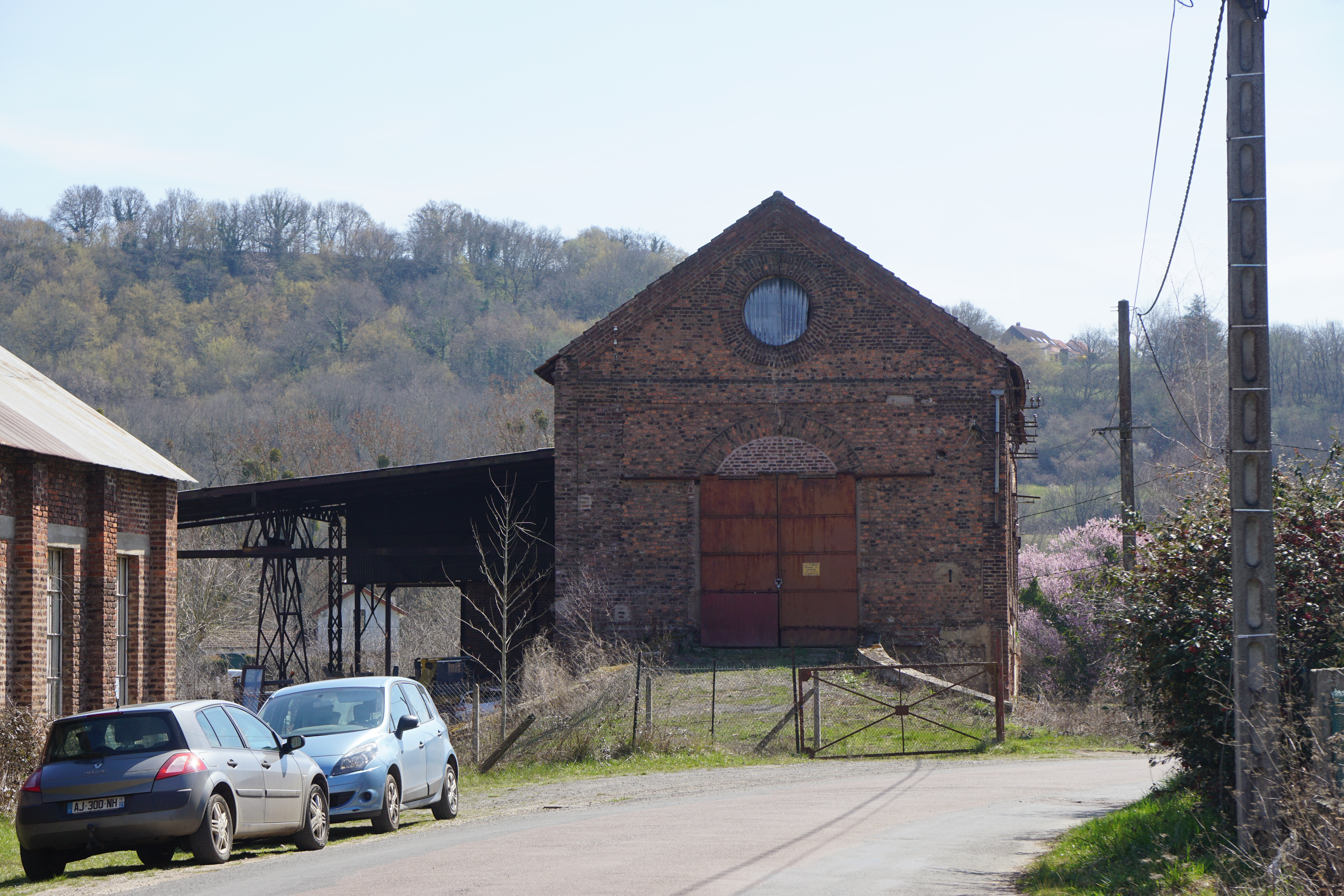
Another facade.

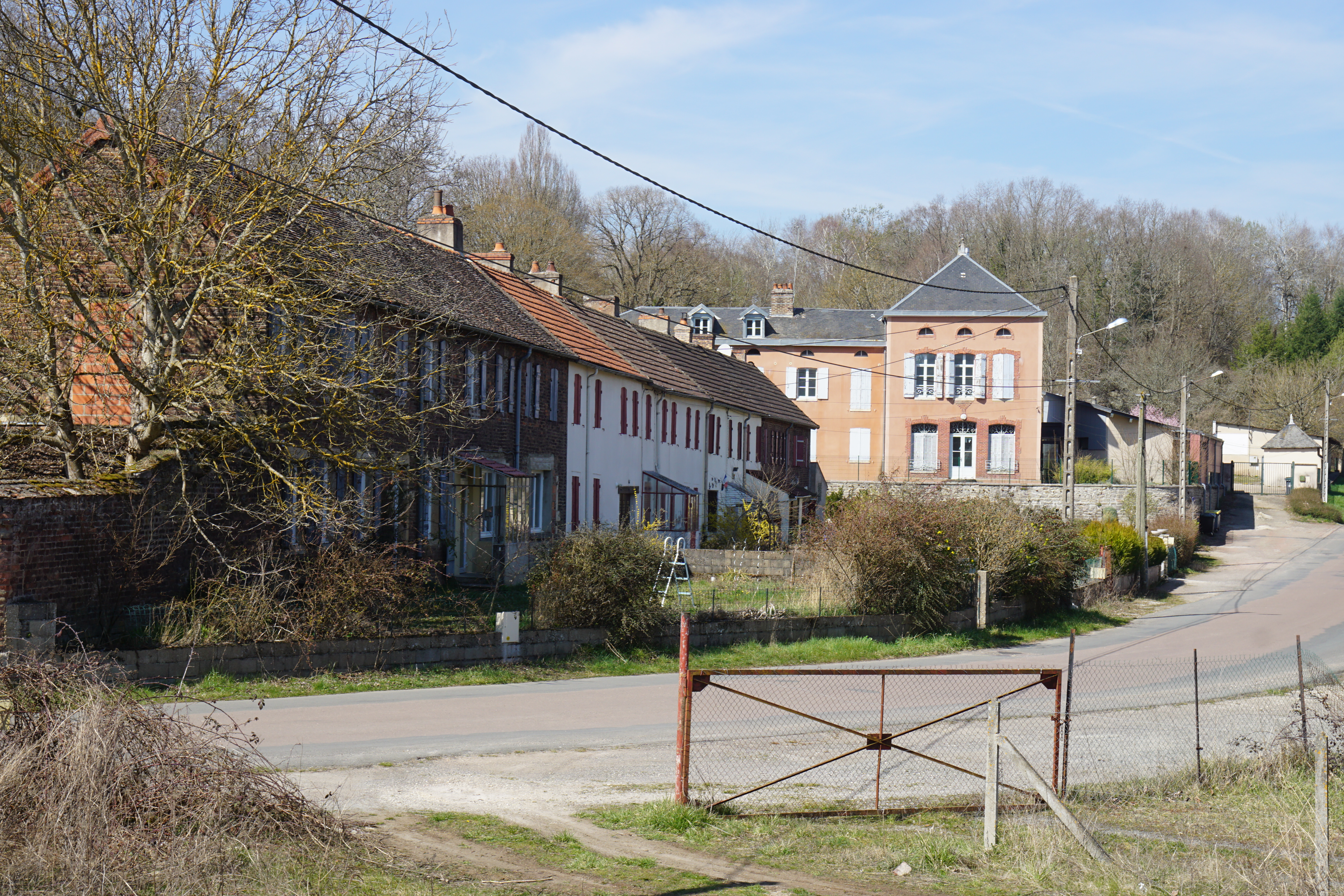
Housing and management.

=== Champ-Pialay shaft ===
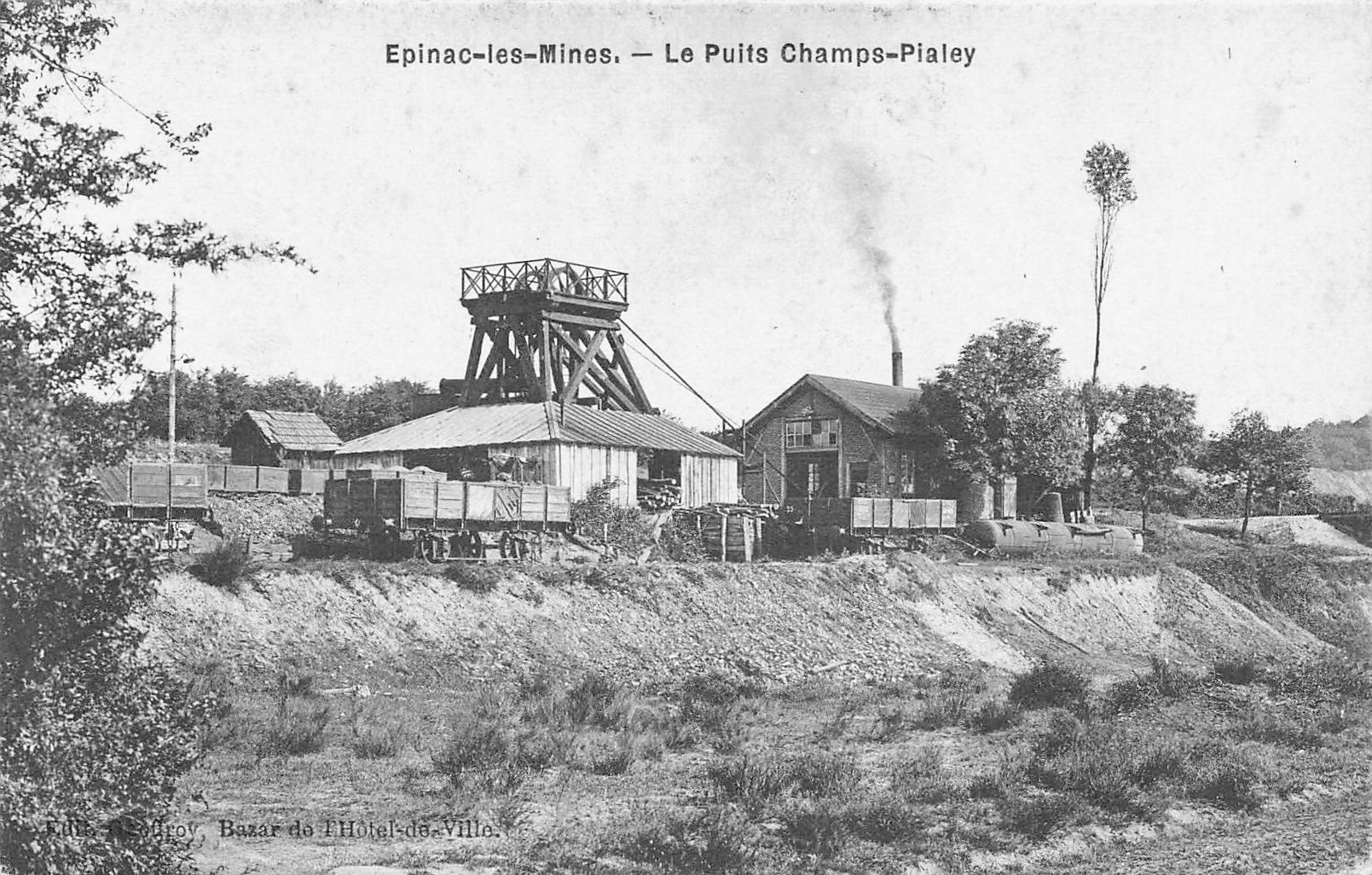
Champ-Pialay shaft

46°59′51″N 4°32′40″E

The Champ-Pialay shaft reached a depth of 86 meters and was in operation from 1891 to 1928.

Tailings from the Champ-Pialay shaft

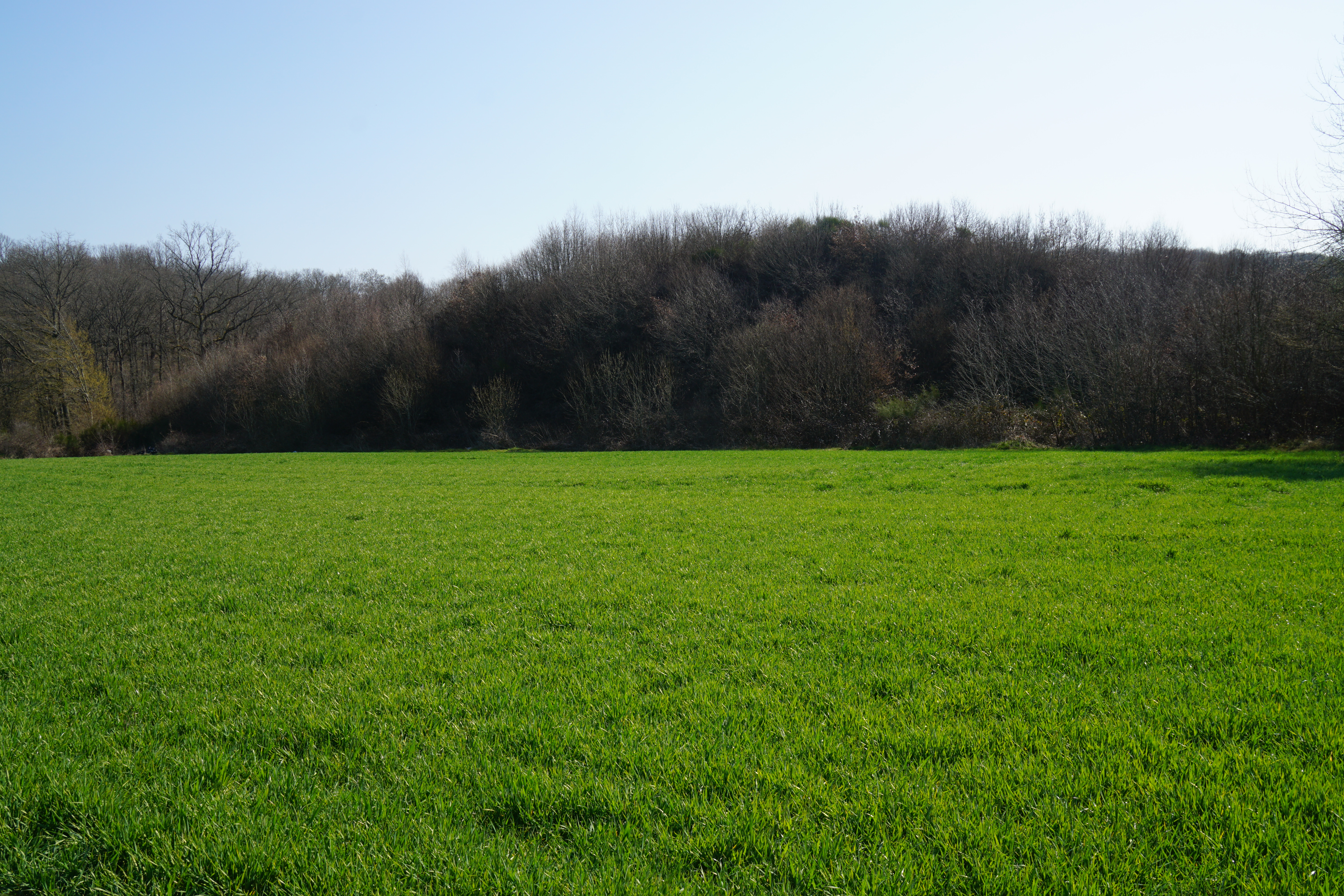

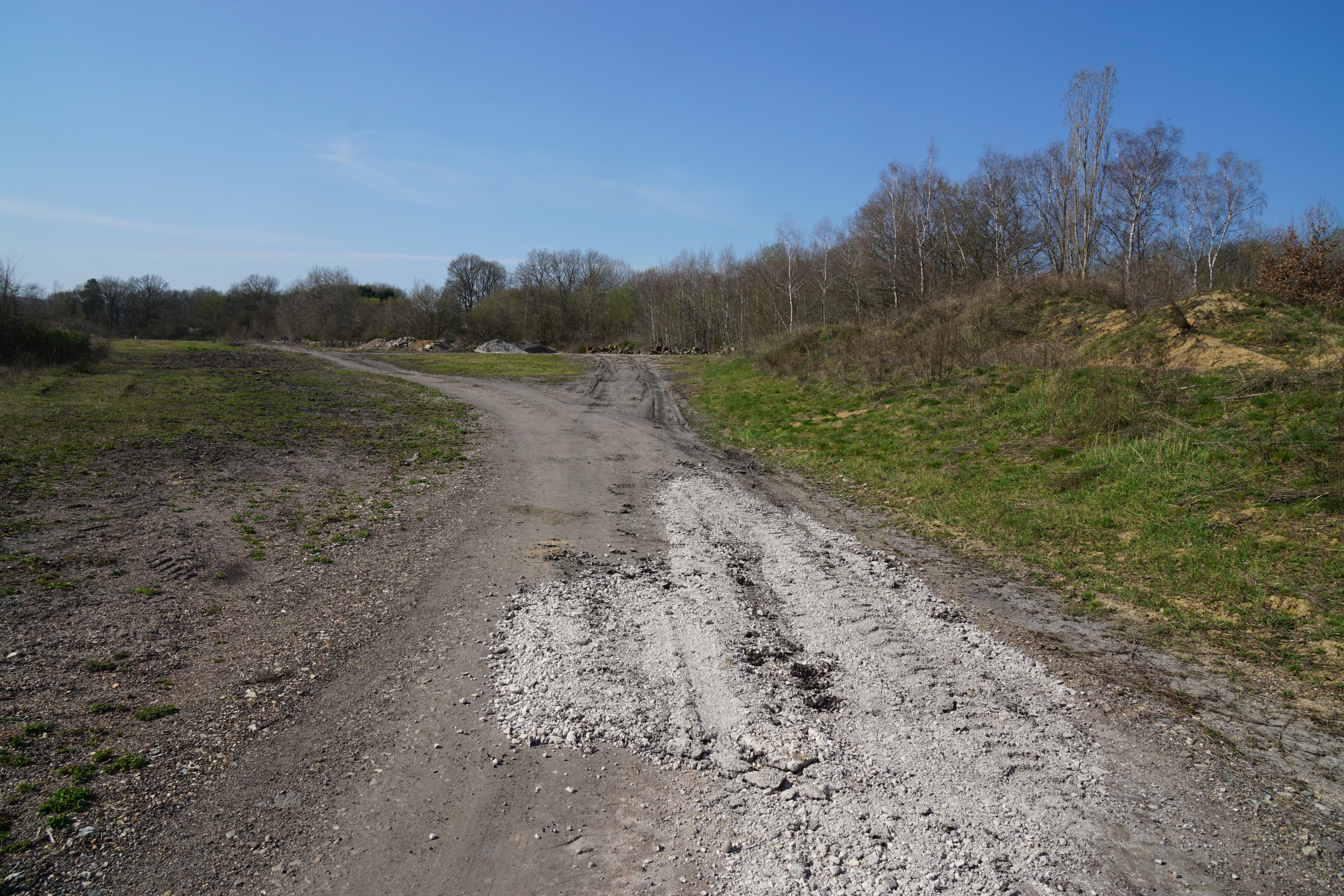

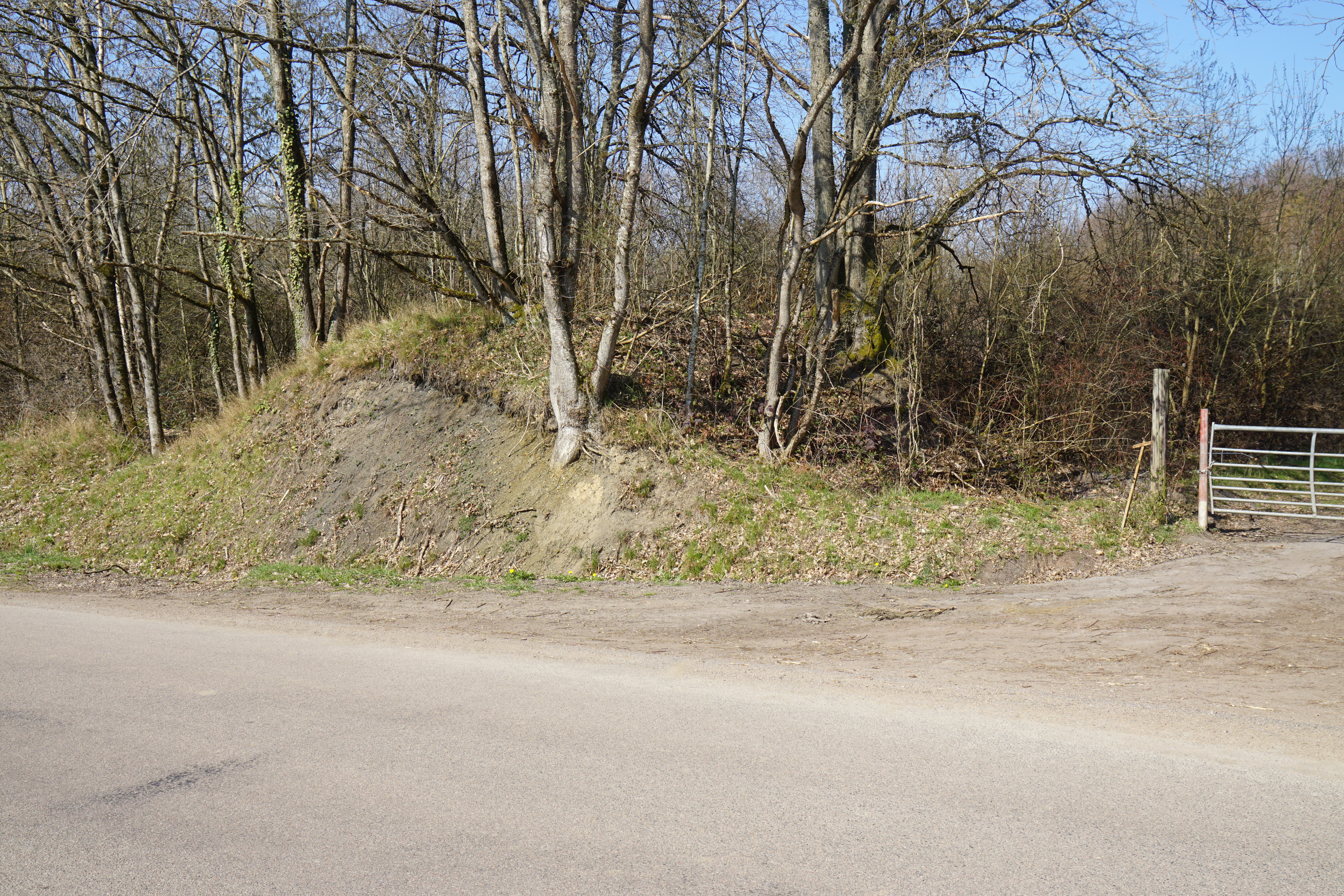

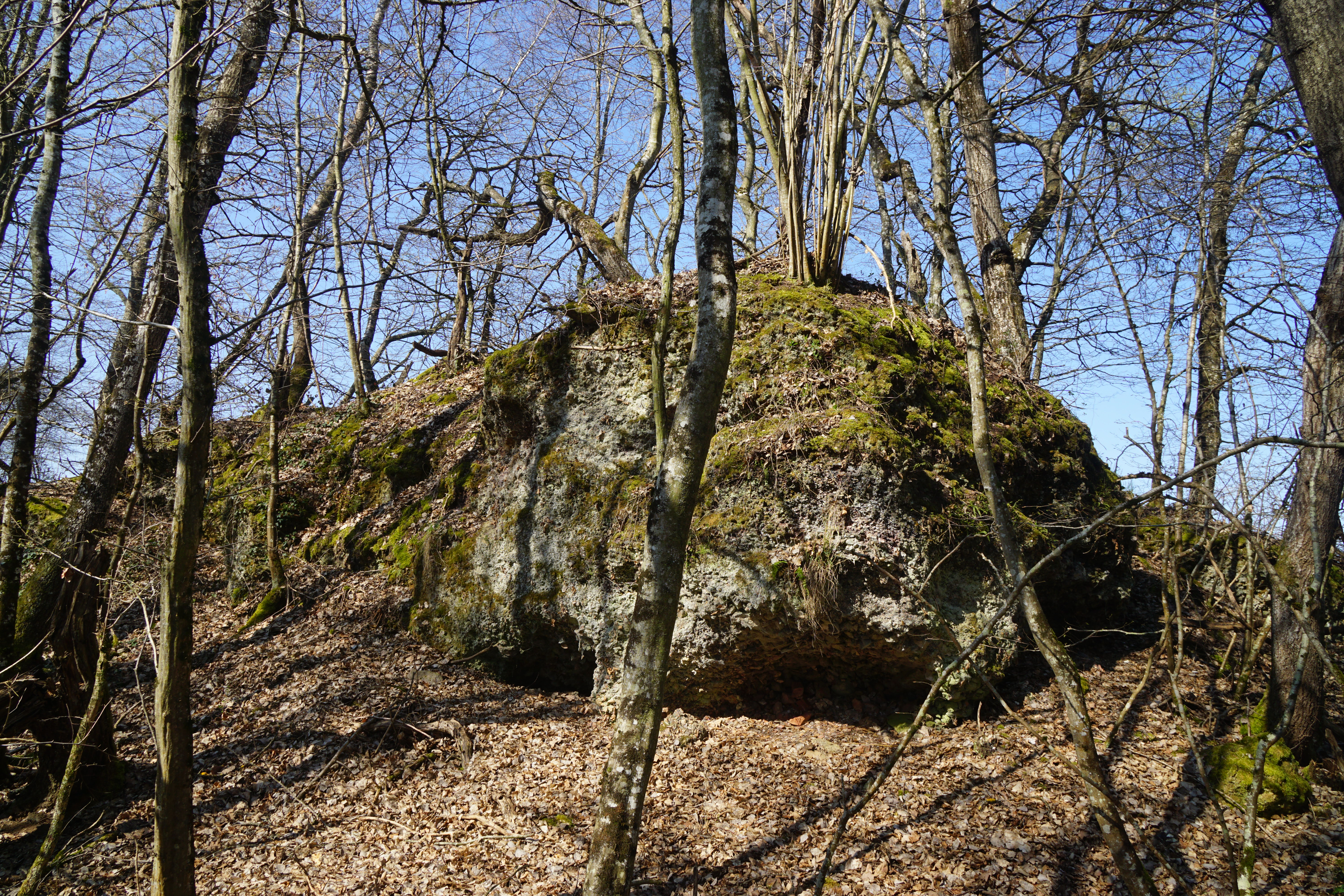

=== Sainte-Barbe shaft ===
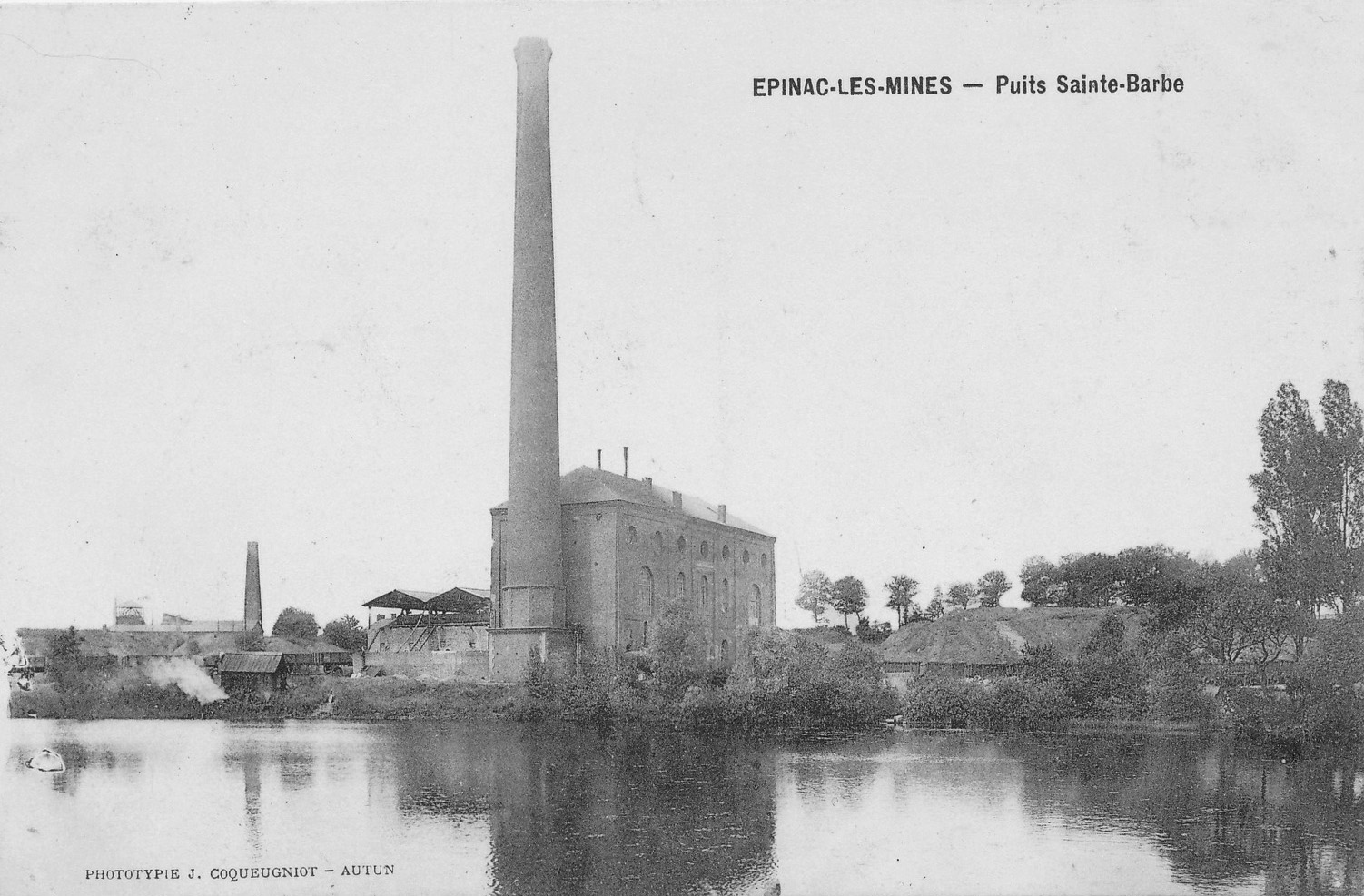
Sainte-Barbe shaft

46°59′42″N 4°32′14″E

The Sainte-Barbe shaft was sunk in 1832 to a depth of 208.7 meters and closed a century later, in 1932. In the 1880s, the Sainte-Barbe shaft became the general drainage shaft for the basin and received a new steam engine similar to that of La Garenne shaft.

Remains of the Sainte-Barbe shaft

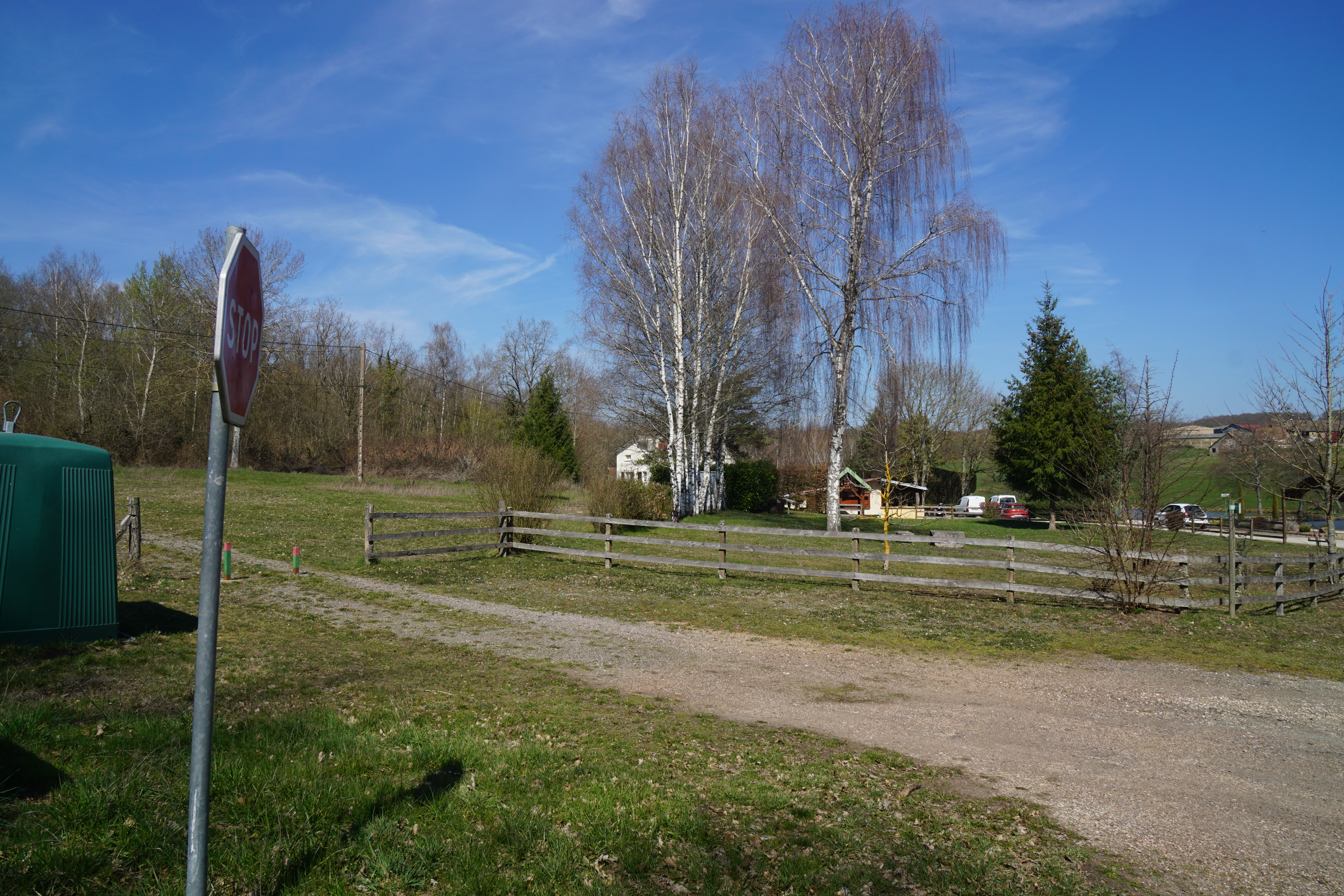
Location of the shaft.

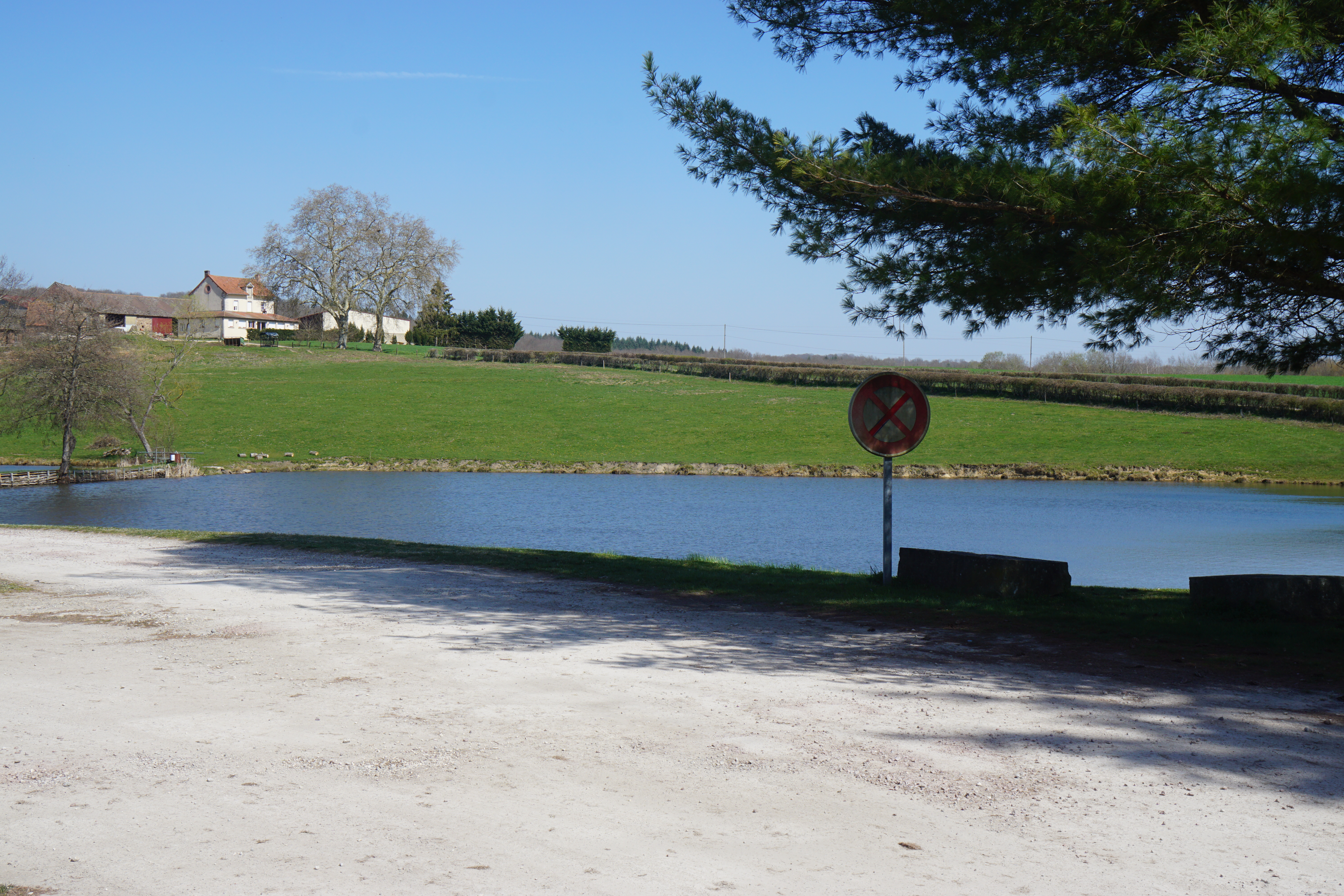
The lake.

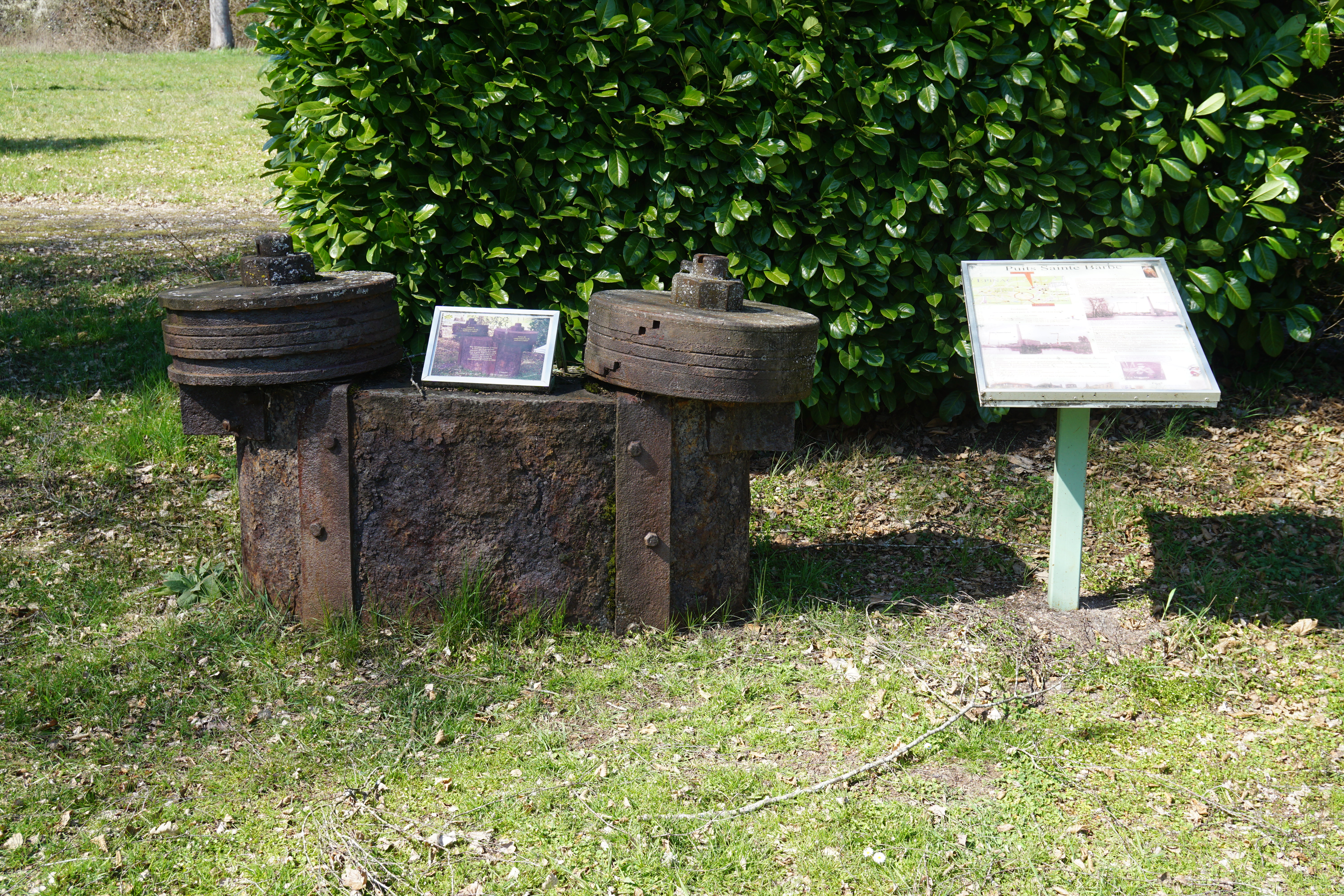
Informational panels.

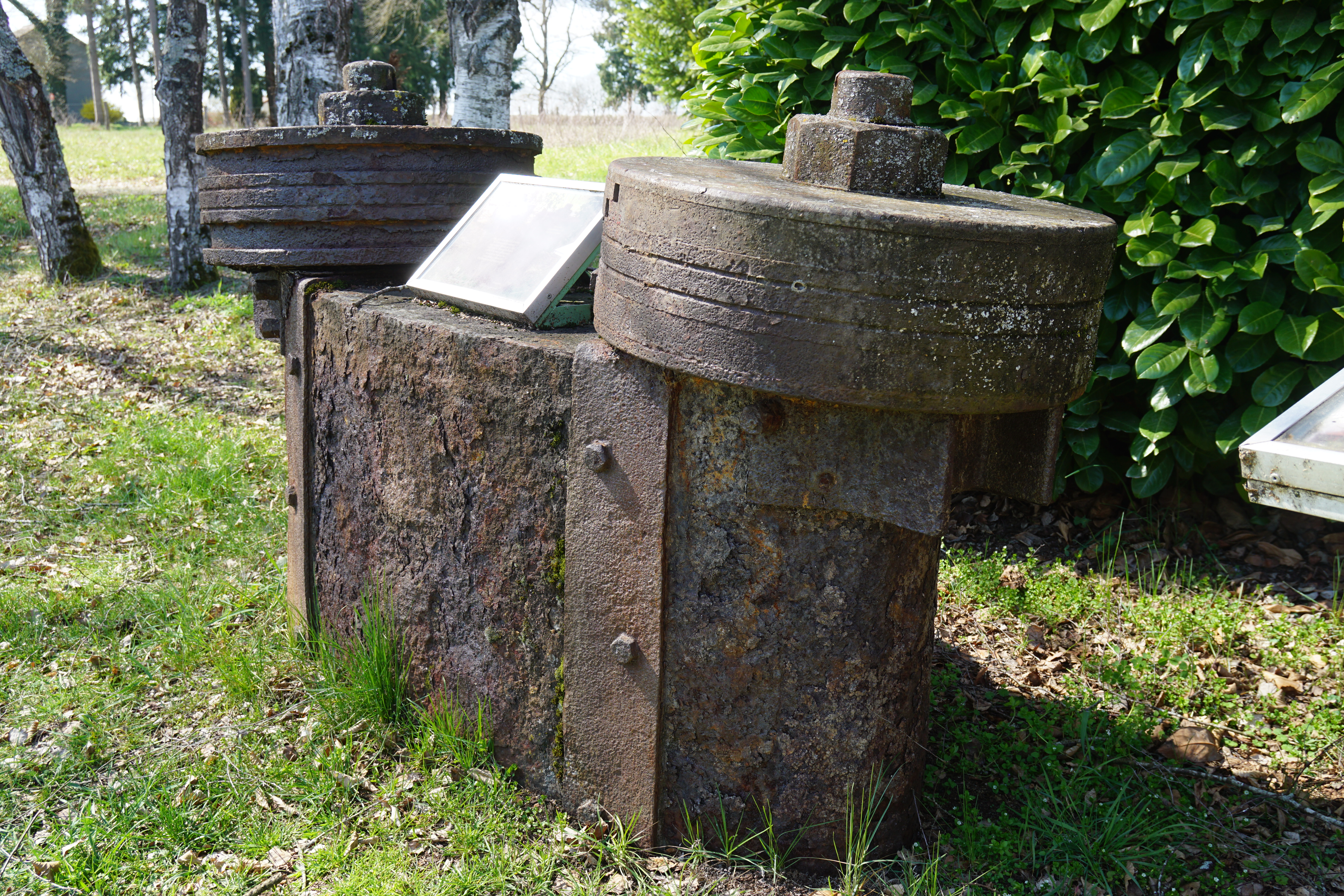
Counterweight used for lowering cages into the shaft.

=== Hagerman shaft ===
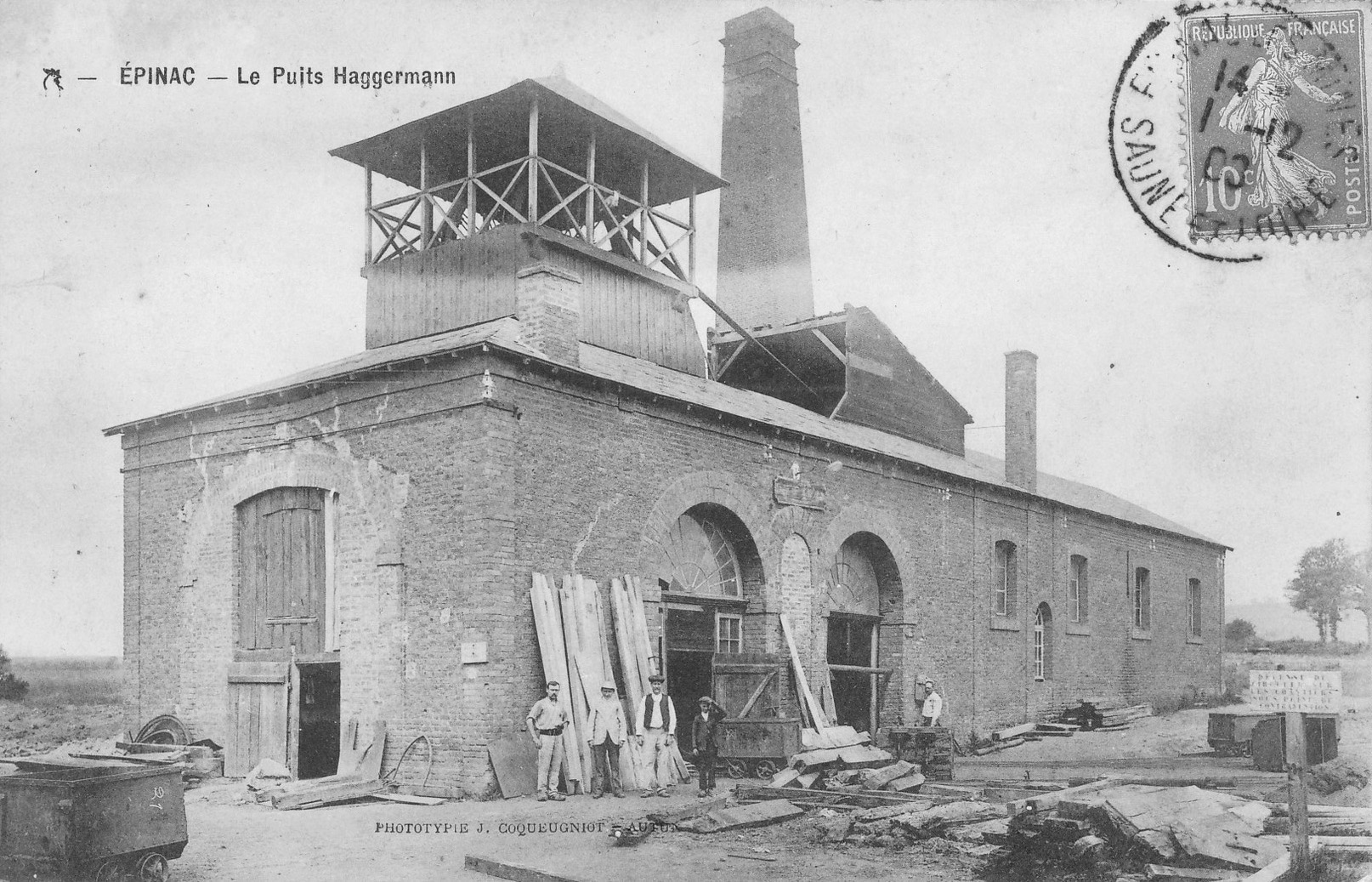
Hagerman shaft

46°59′37″N 4°32′11″E

The Hagerman shaft was sunk in 1836 to a depth of 290 meters. It was demolished after its closure.

Remains of the Hagerman shaft

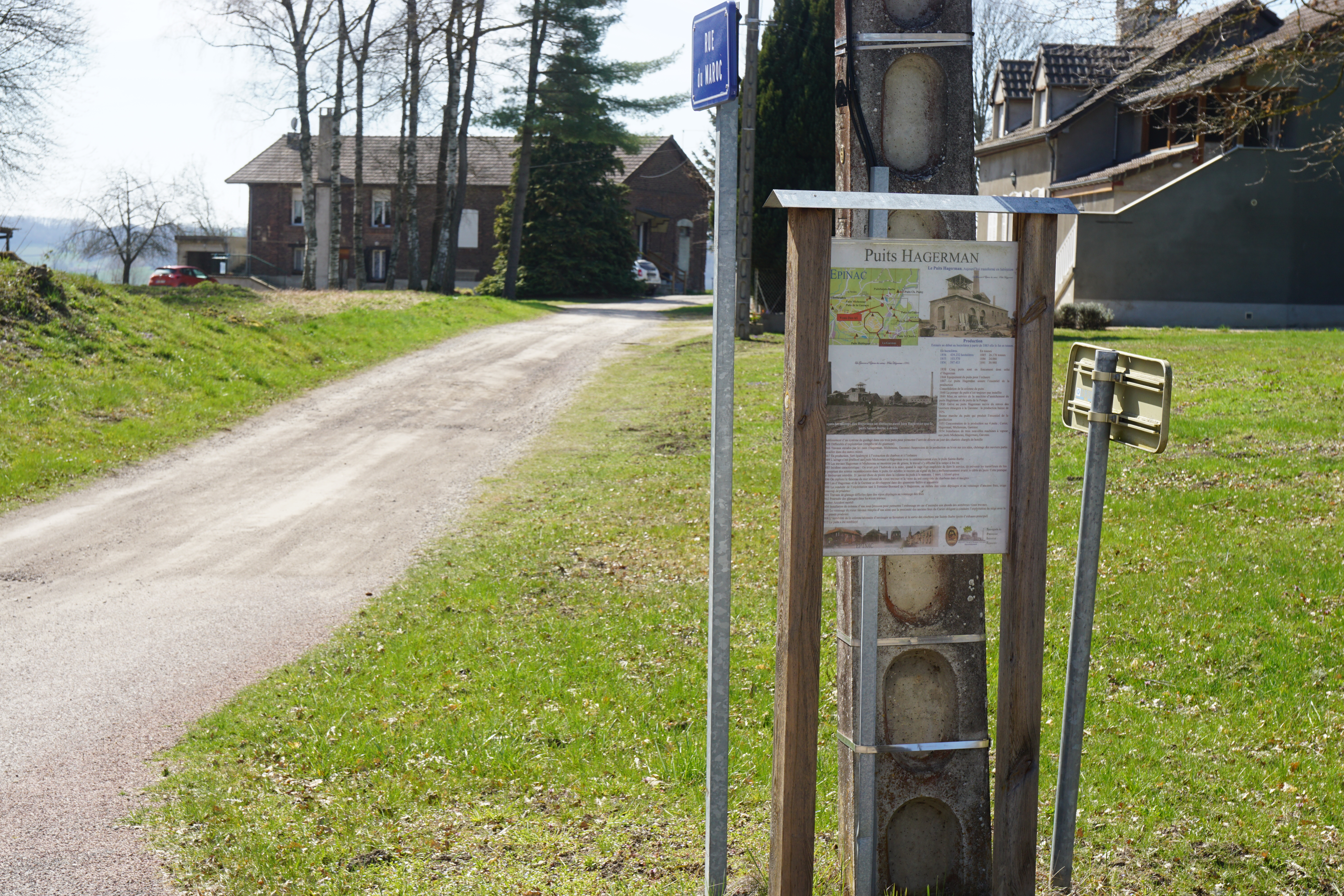
Distant view of the extraction building converted into housing.

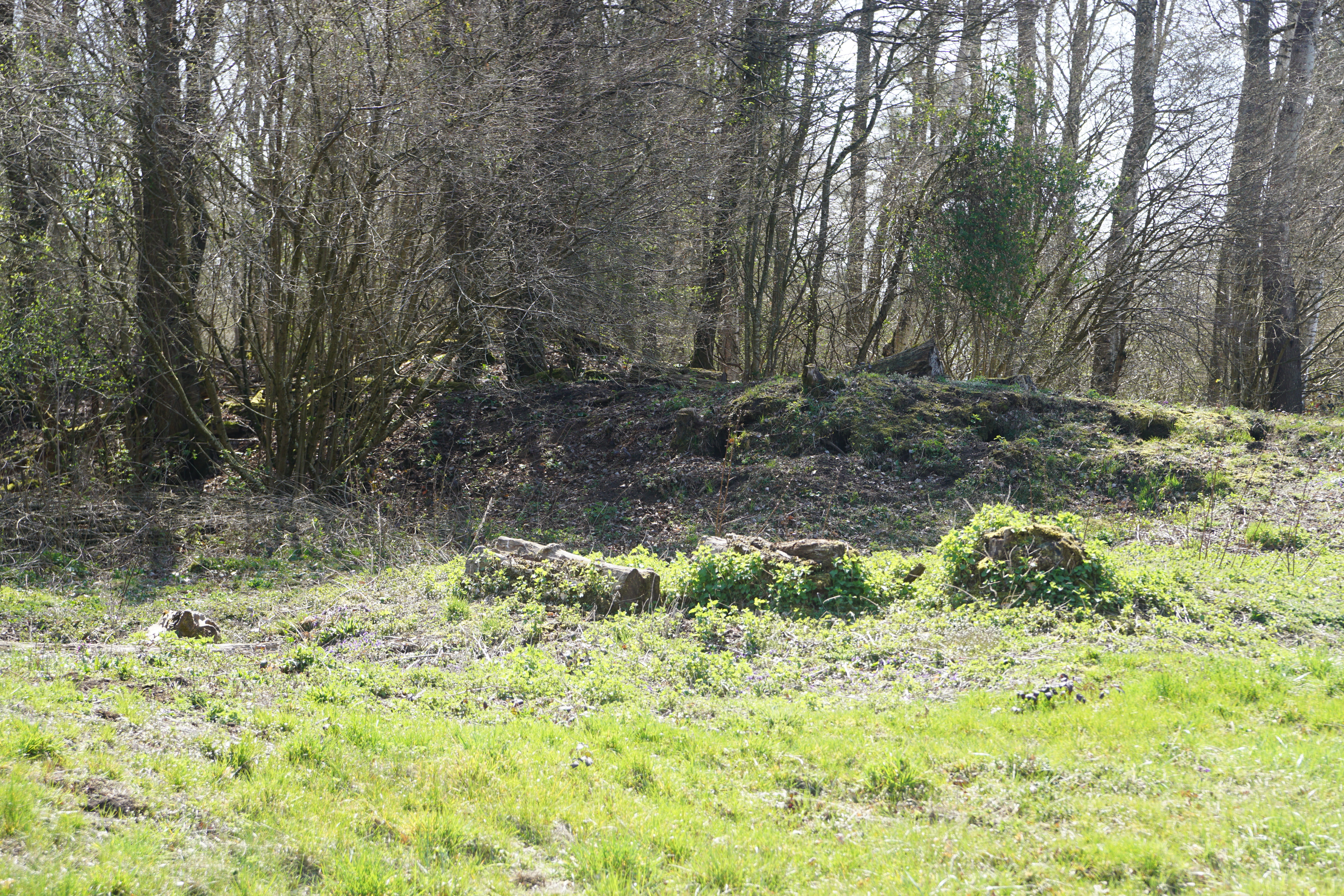
The spoil heap.

=== Michenaux shaft ===
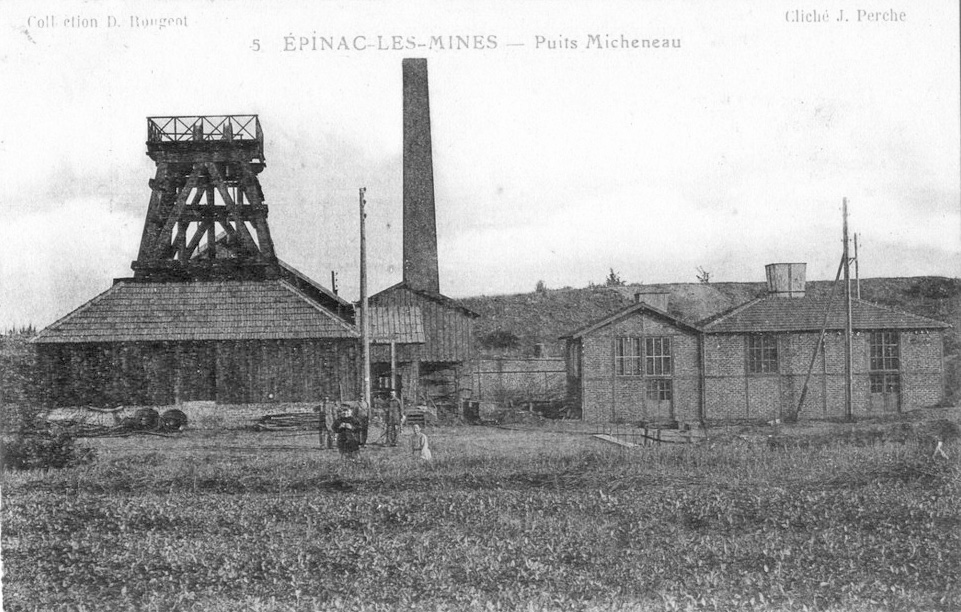
Michenaux shaft

46°59′45″N 4°31′44″E

The Michenaux shaft reached a depth of 350 meters and was in operation from 1837 to 1928.

Remains of the Michenaux shaft

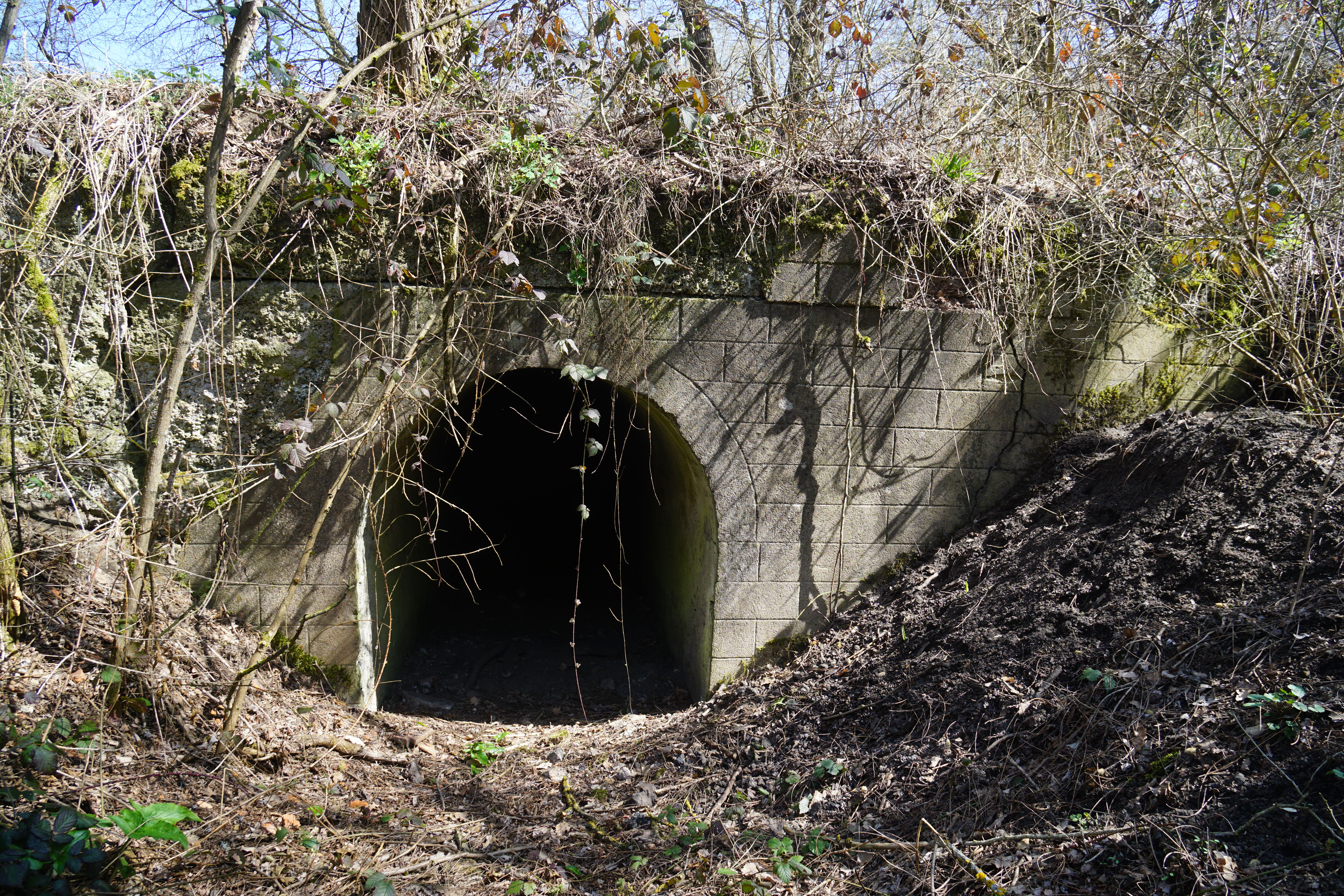
Tunnel entrance.

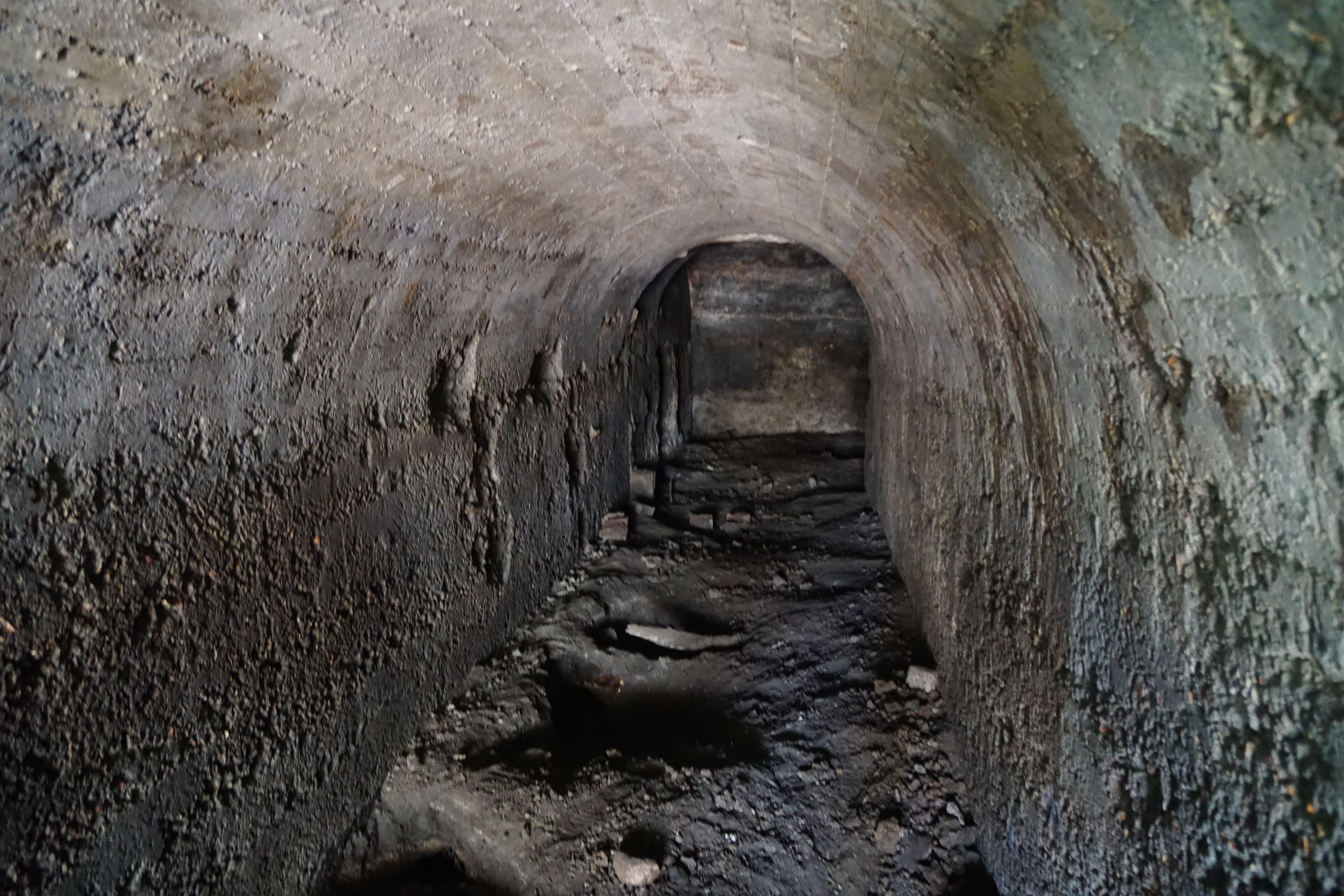
Inside the tunnel.

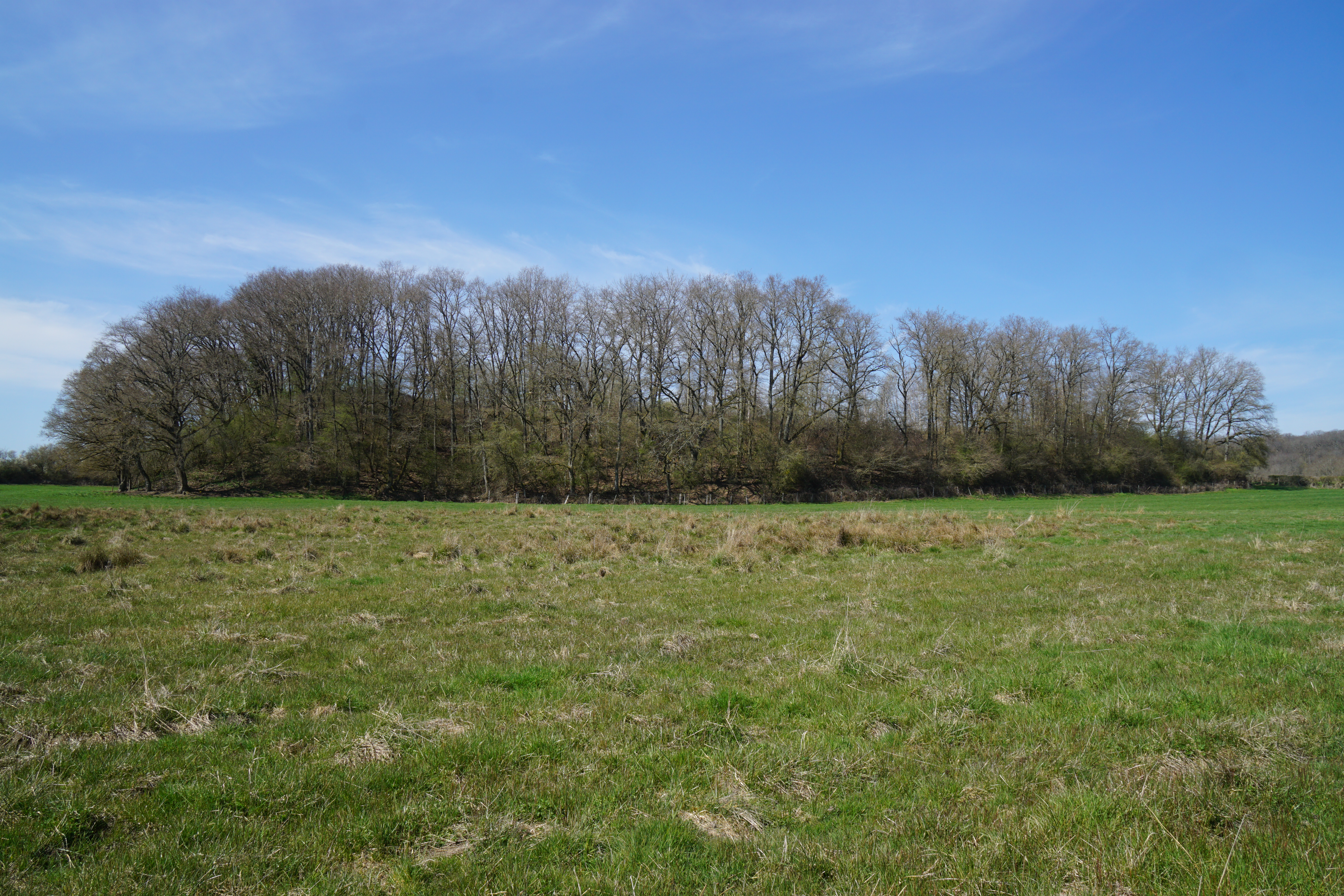
View of the spoil heap along its length.

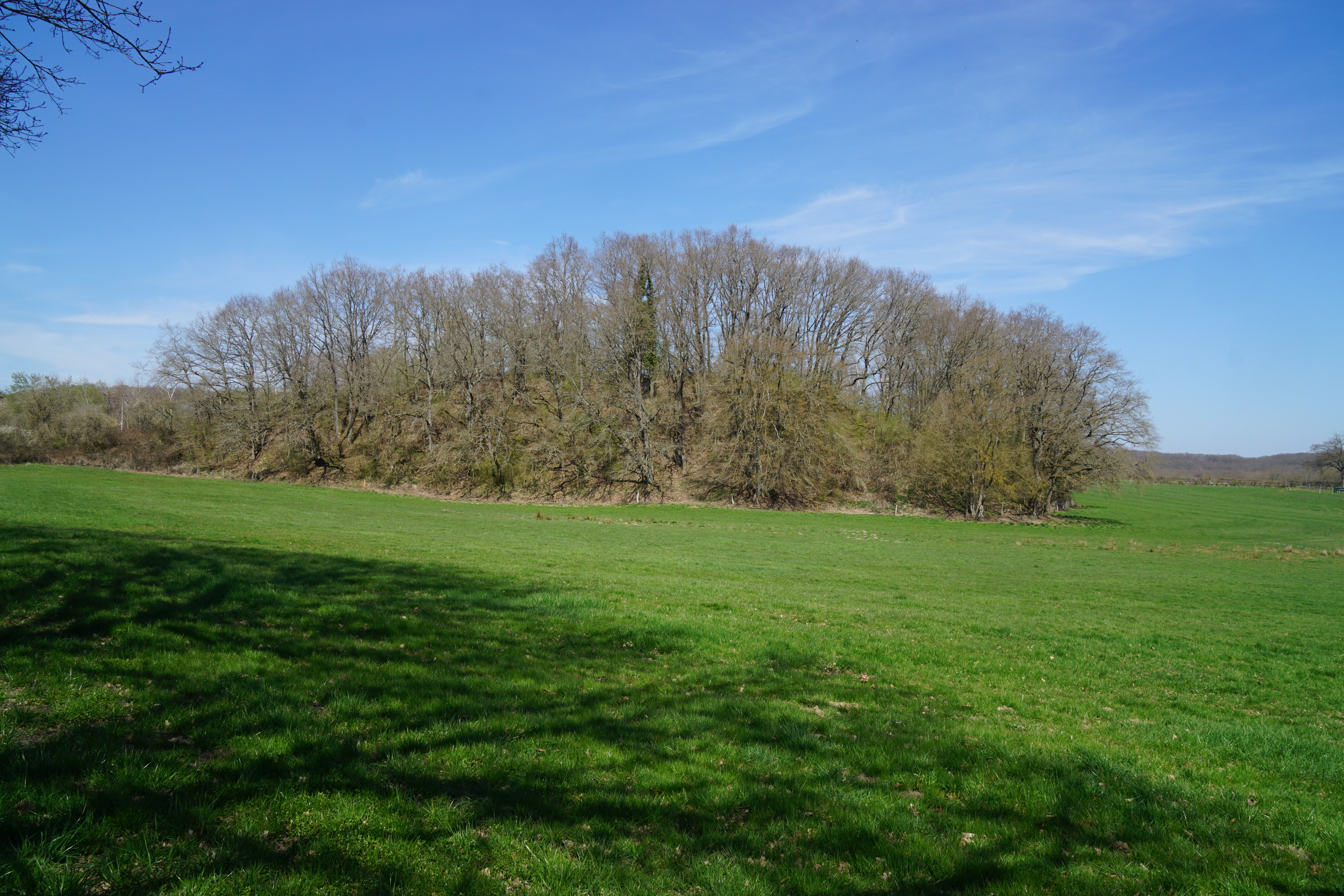
End of the spoil heap.

=== Lestiboudois shaft ===
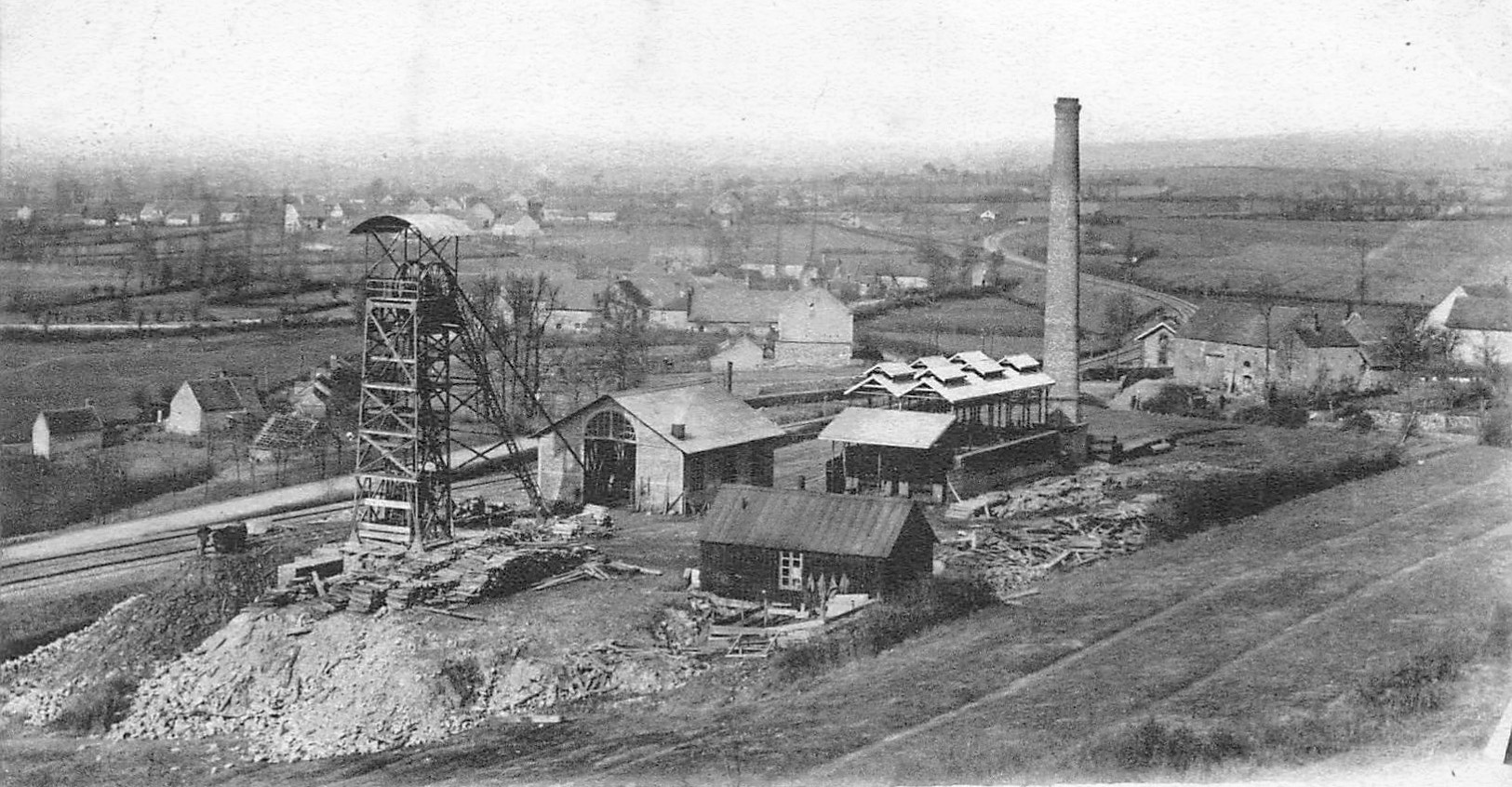
Lestiboudois shaft

46°59′42″N 4°30′27″E

The Lestiboudois shaft was sunk at the foot of the Château d'Épinac. It intersected the continuation of the layers mined by the Hagerman shaft, La Garenne shaft, and Michenaux shaft at a 600-meter depth.

Remains of the Lestiboudois shaft

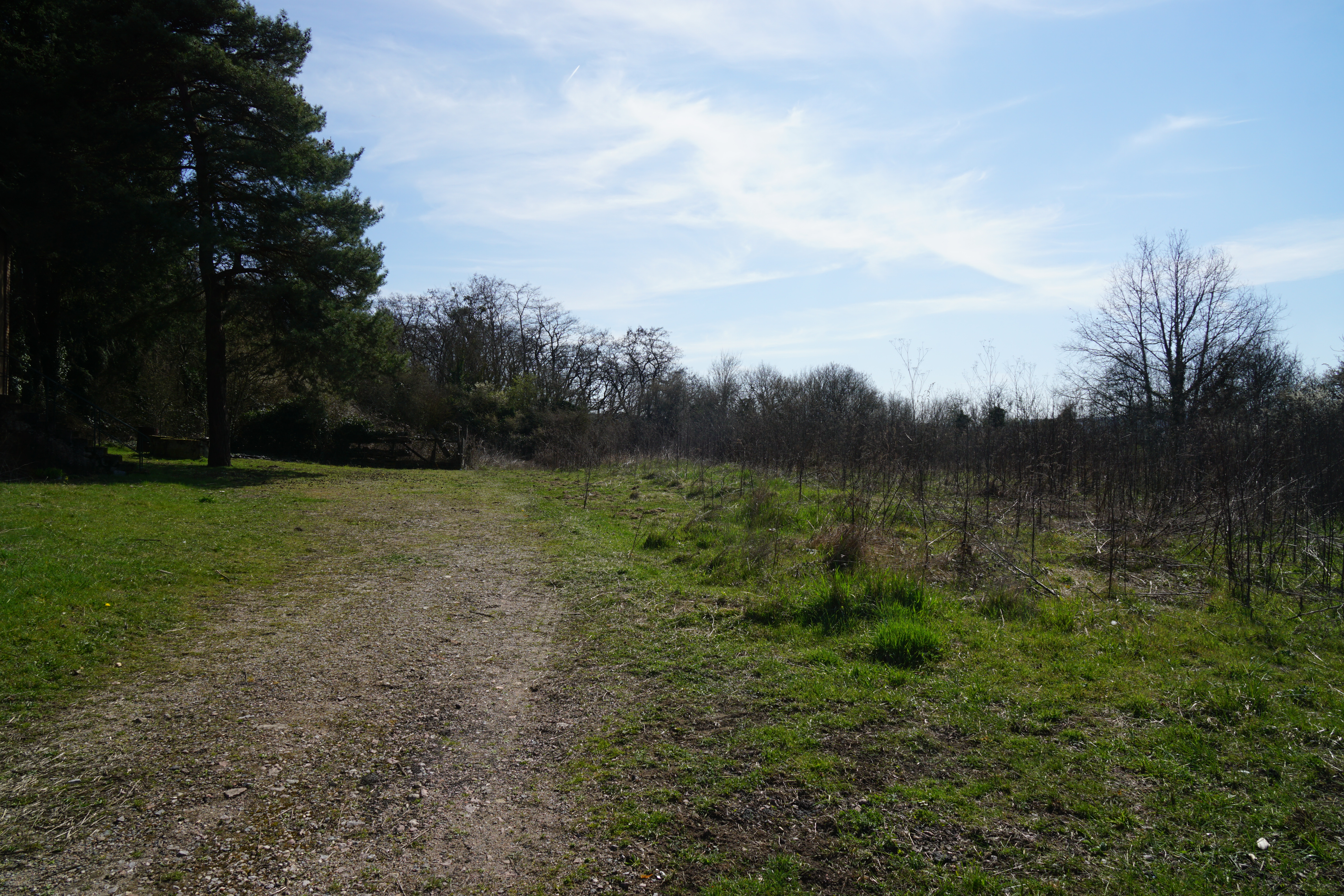
Location of the shaft.

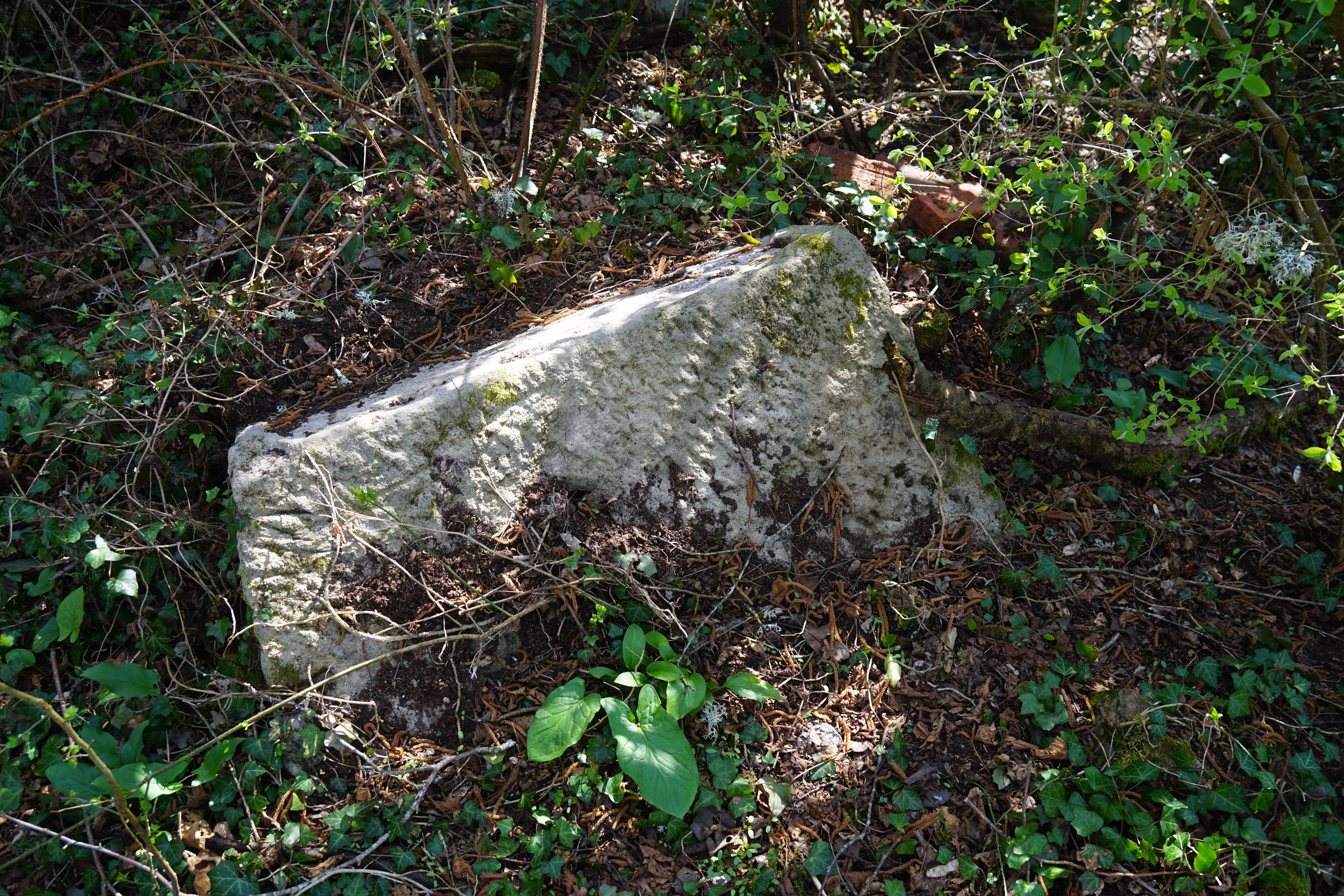
Foot of the headgear.

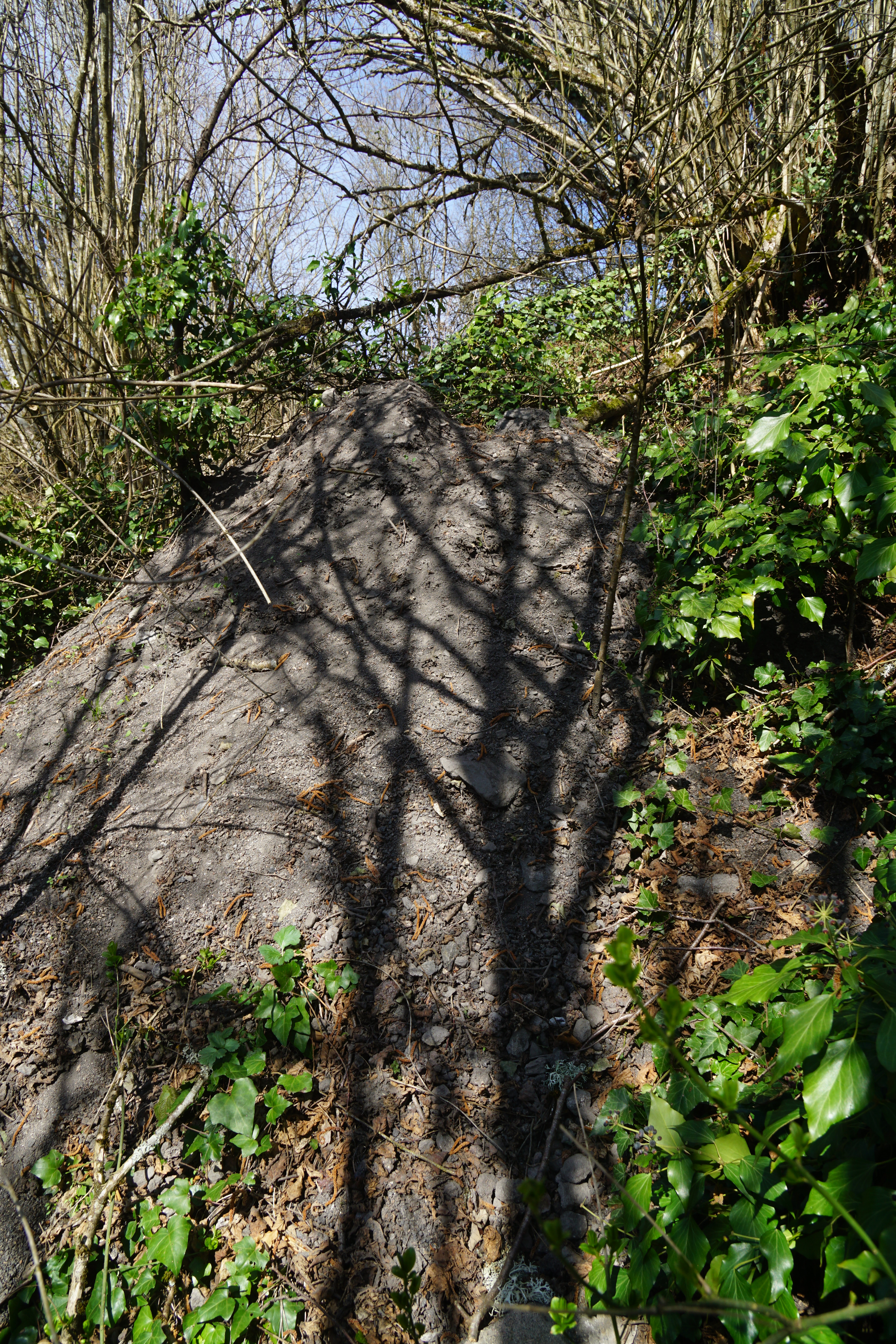
The spoil heap.

=== Hottinguer shaft ===
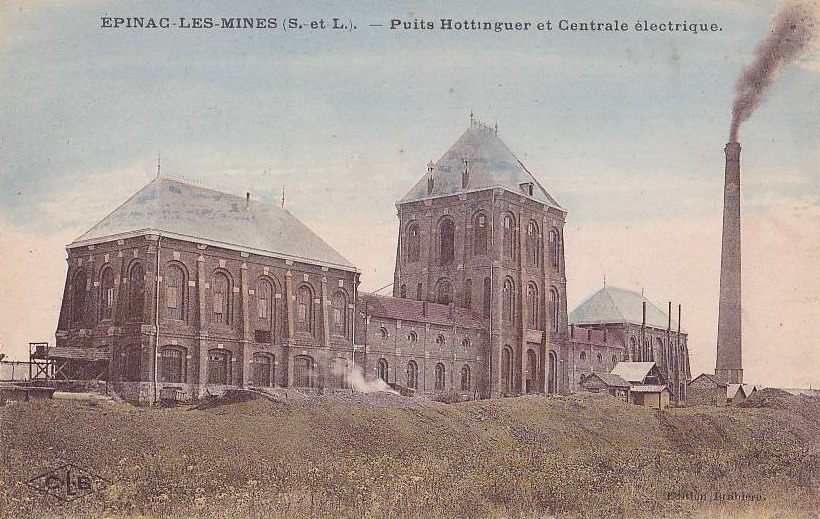
Hottinguer shaft

46°59′01″N 4°31′15″E

The buildings of the Hottinguer shaft were constructed between 1872 and 1876. They housed a revolutionary atmospheric extraction system: a piston moving within a 558-meter-high tube, machined in Le Creusot (an original technique developed by engineer Zulma Blanchet), rather than traditional cables, which at the time could not reach such depths (over 600 meters). After its closure in 1936, the site was converted into a paint factory before falling into abandonment at the end of the 20th century due to a fire. It was listed as a historical monument on November 26, 1992. The Malakoff tower and its wings have been under renovation since late 2012. The construction of a photovoltaic power plant near the old buildings was planned for 2016.

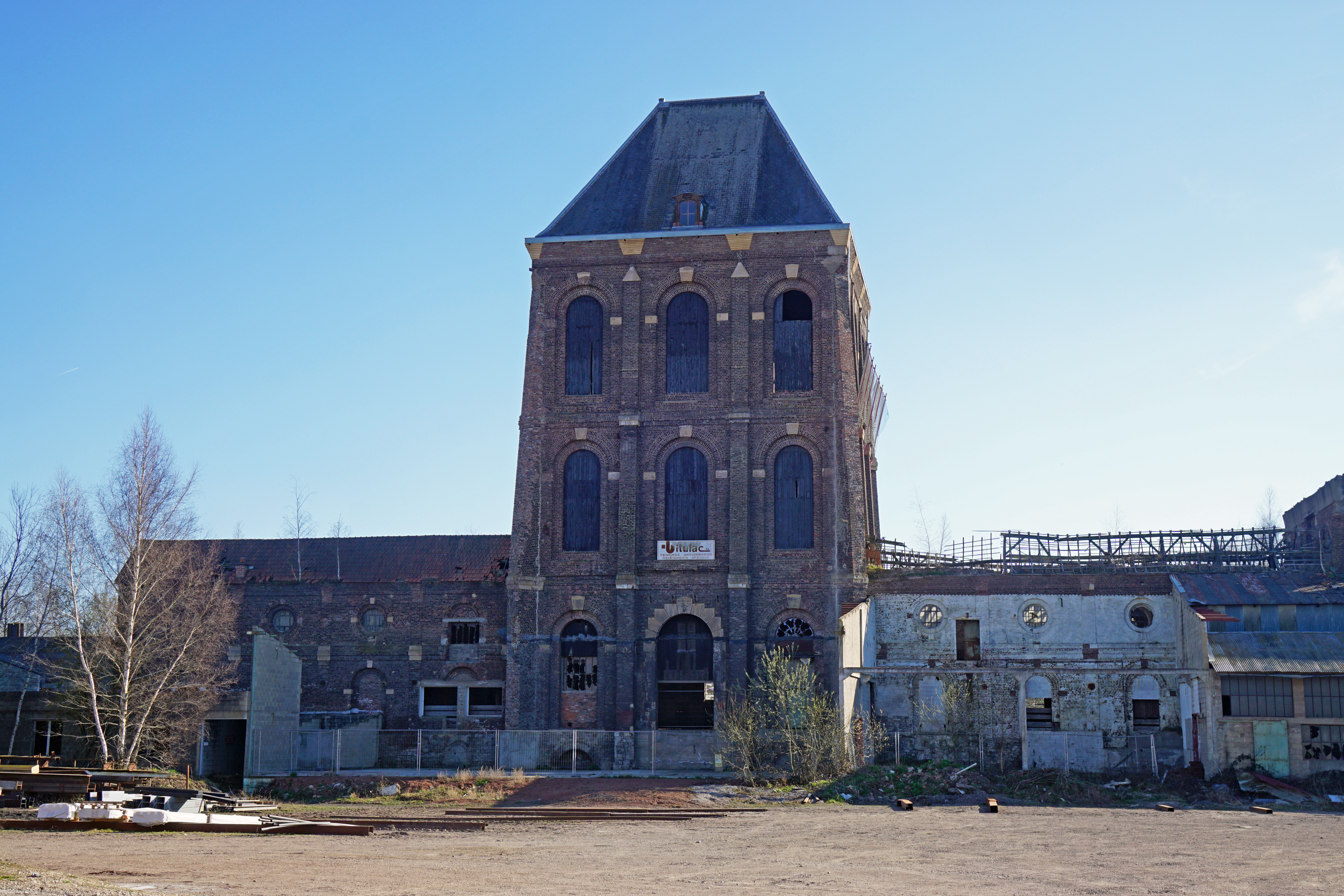
The Malakoff Tower to be renovated in 2019.

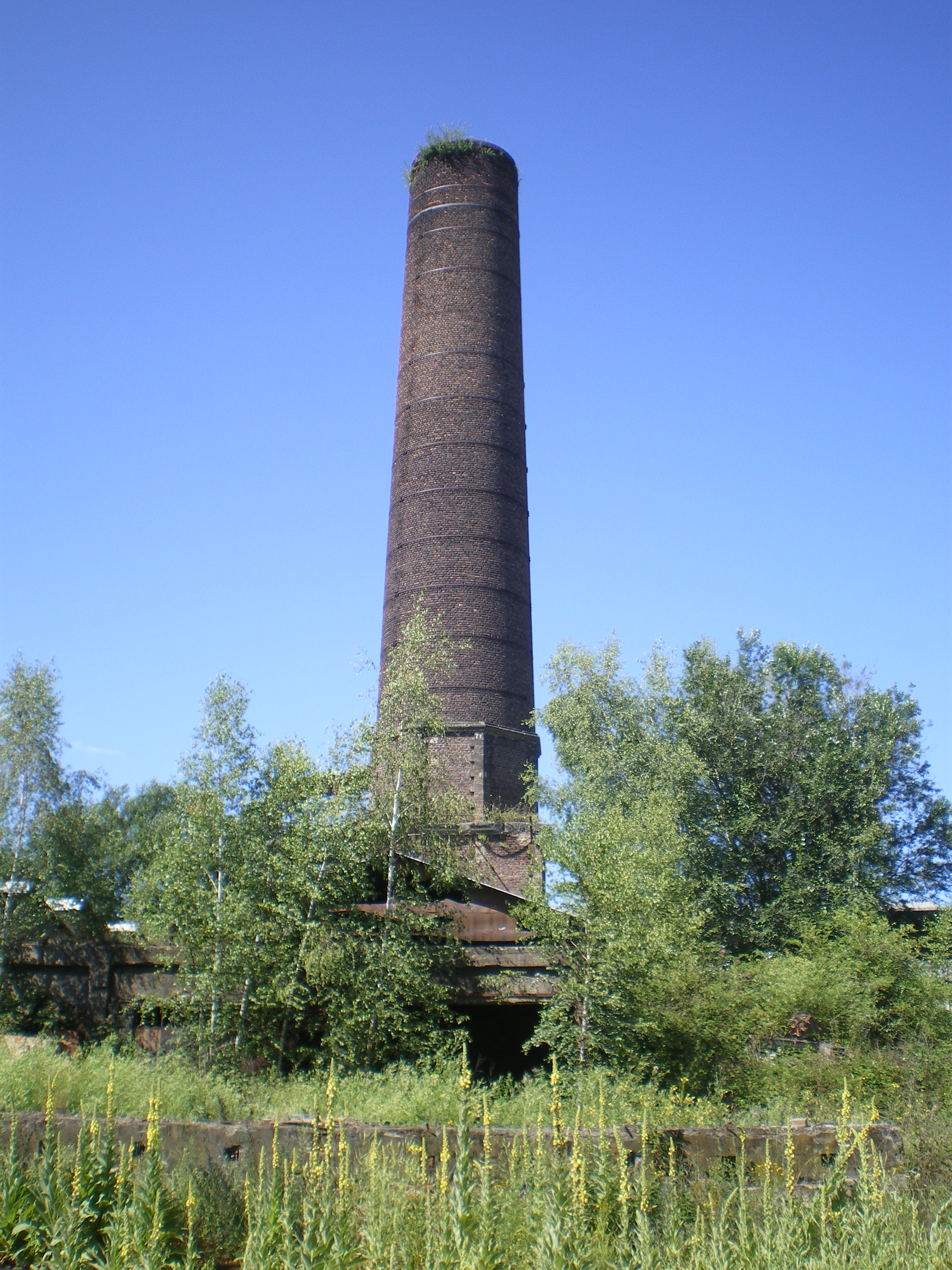
The power plant chimney.

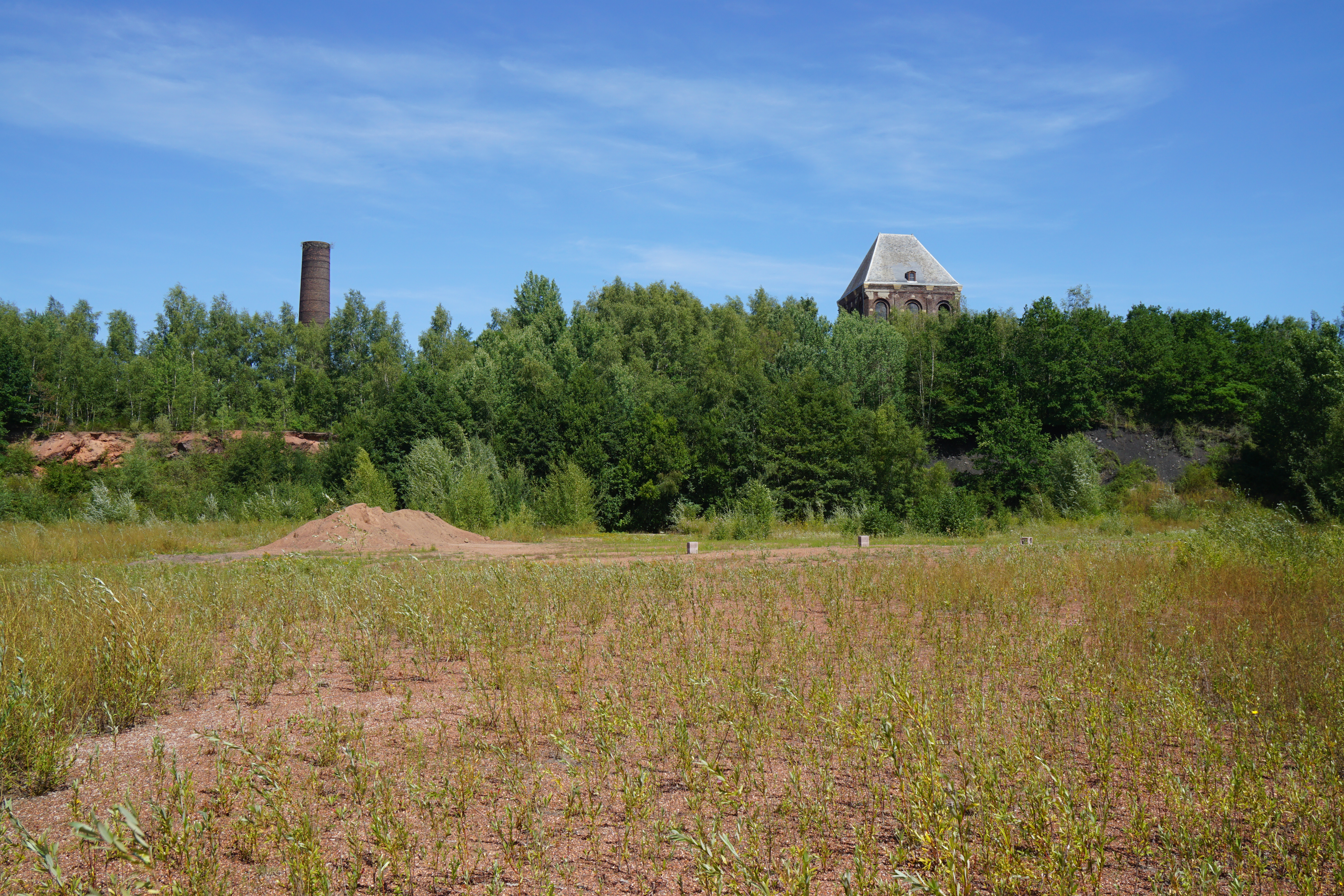
The tower and chimney as seen from the slag heap.

=== L’Ouche shaft ===
The mining activity at the L’Ouche shaft began in 1774.

Tailings from the L’Ouche shaft.

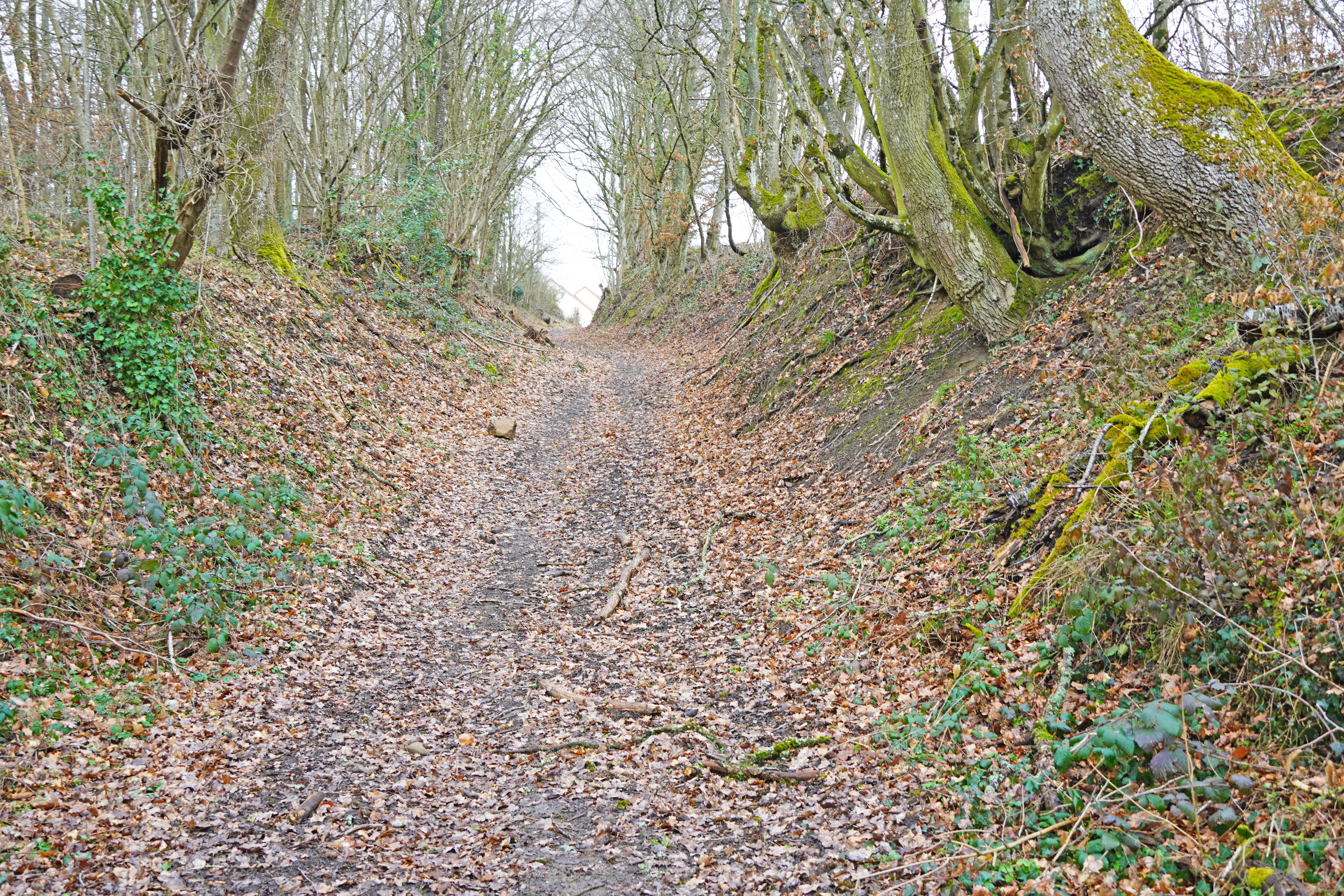

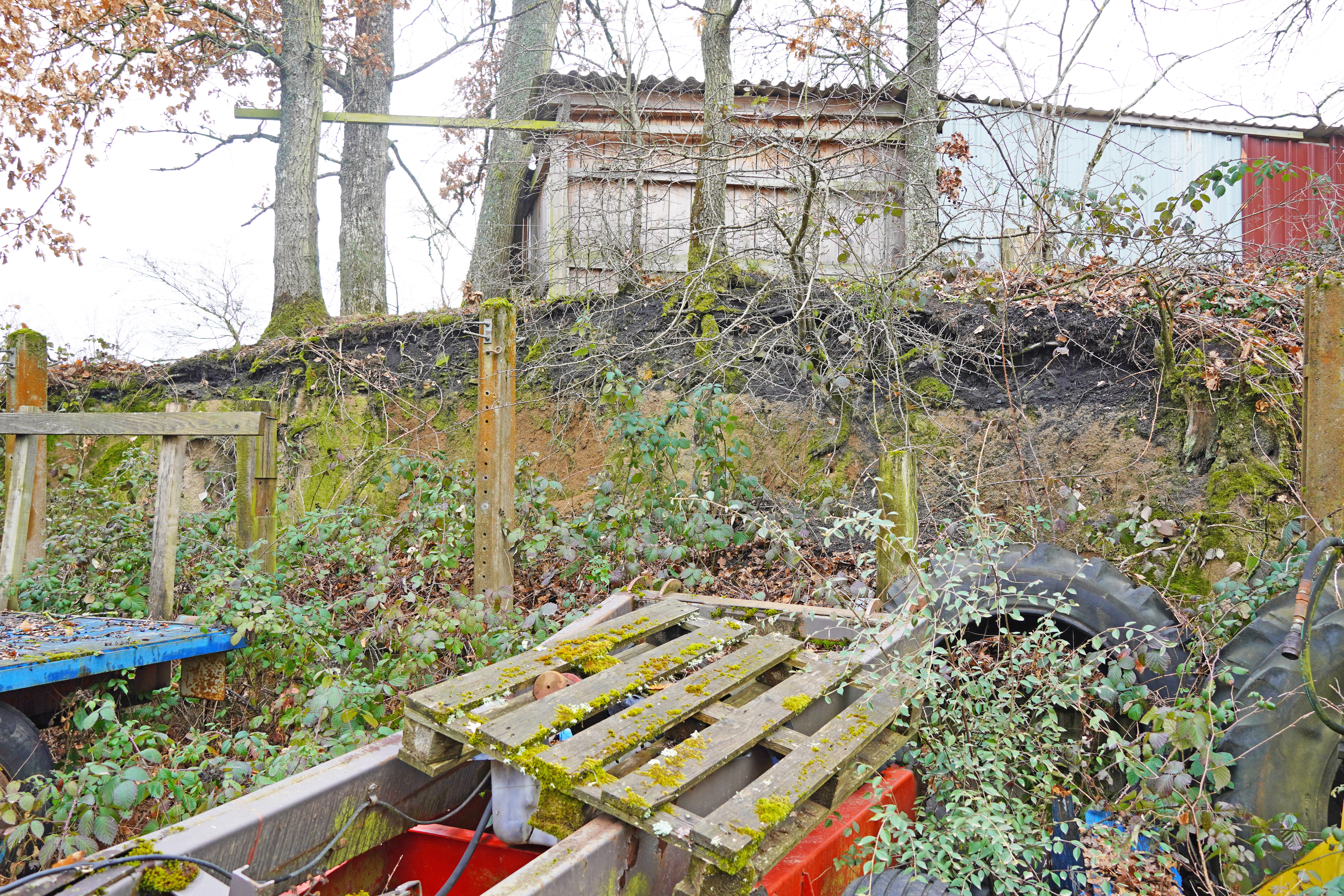

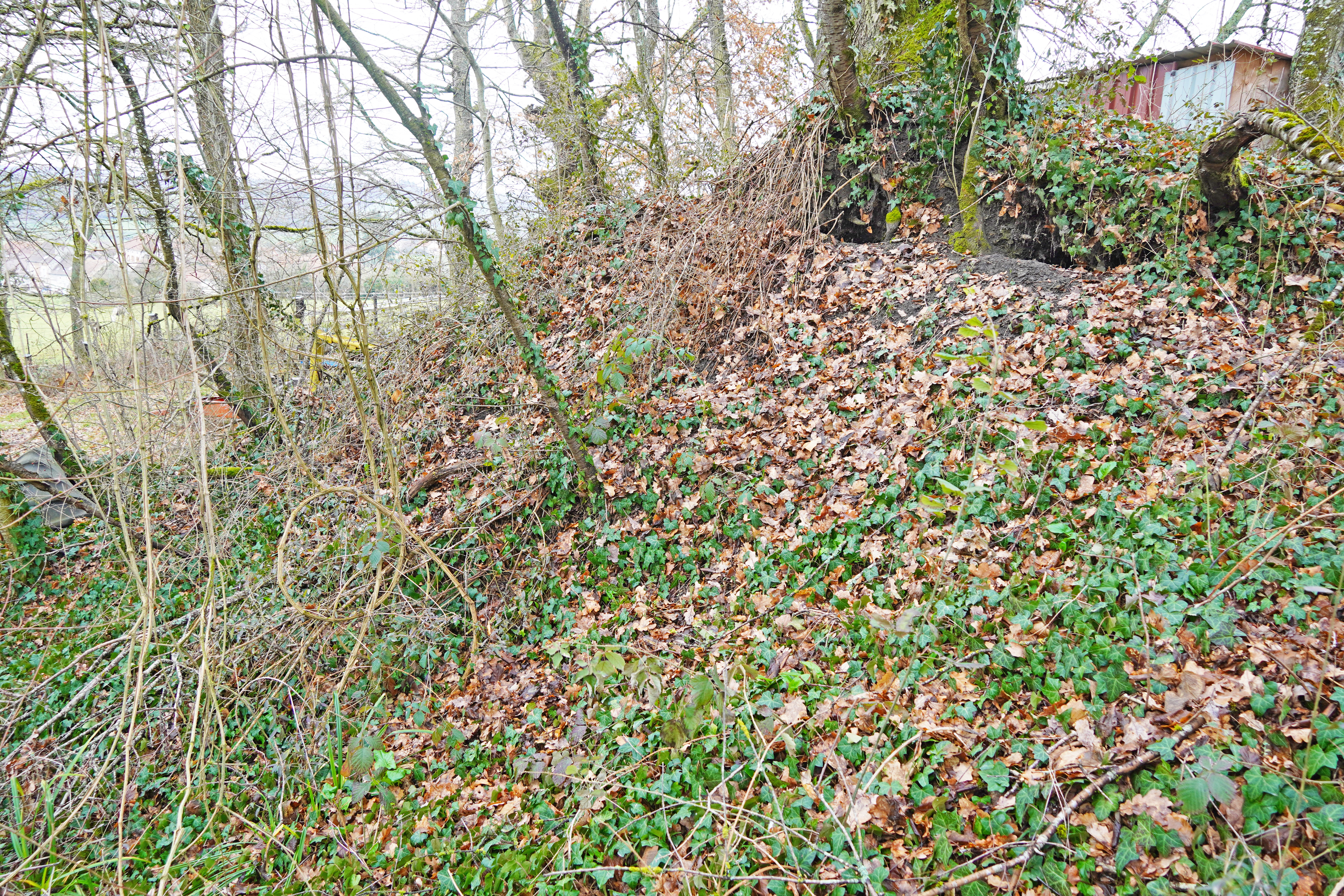

=== Fourneaux shaft ===
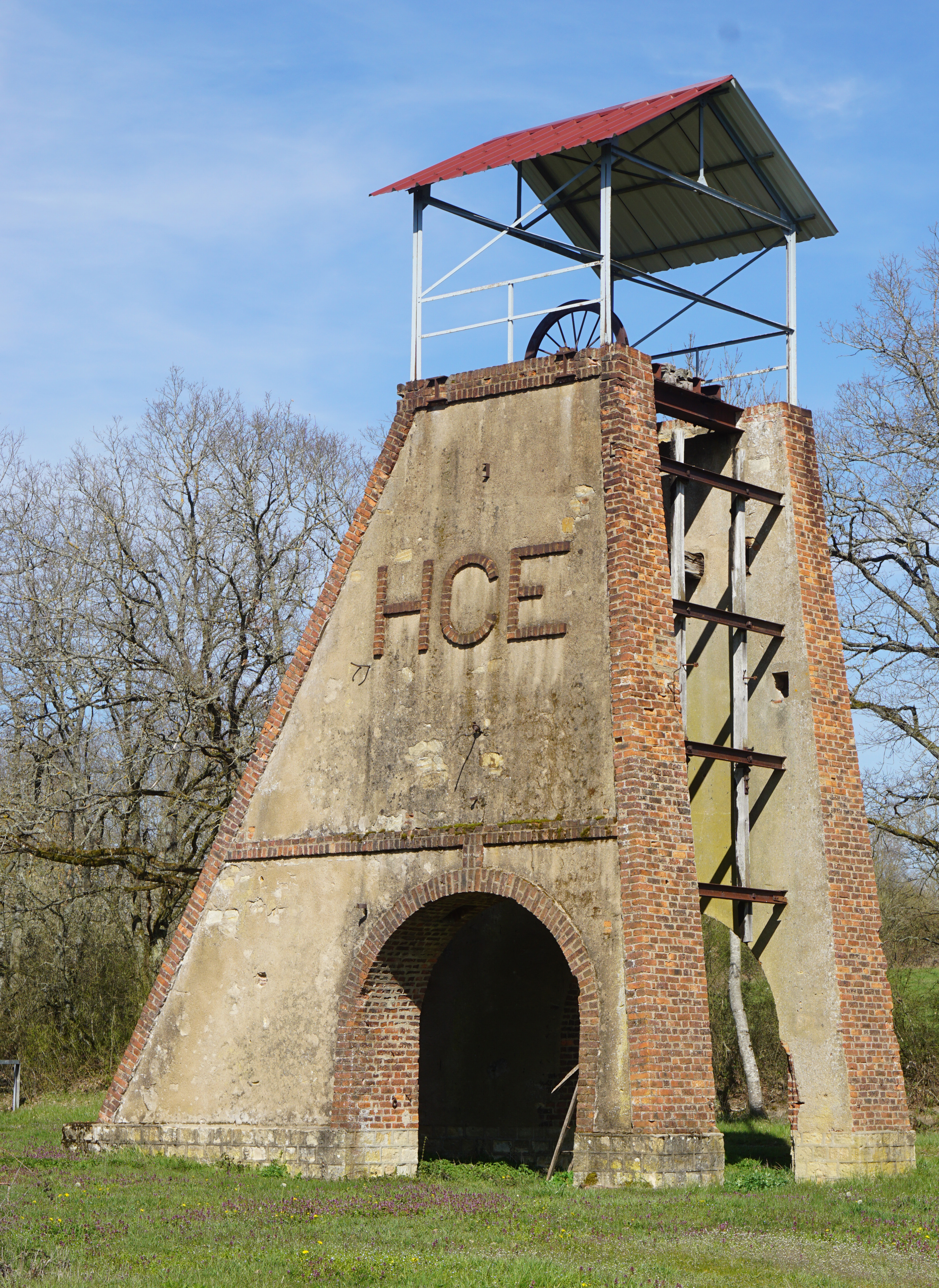
The Fourneaux shaft headframe.

47°01′02″N 4°27′32″E

The Fourneaux shaft was sunk to a depth of 130 meters by the Société des Houillères du Grand Moloy in the commune of Saint-Léger-du-Bois. It began operations in 1928 and was later acquired by the Société des Houillères et Chemins de fer d'Épinac. In 1943, the Société Minière des Schistes Bitumeux (SMSB) purchased the mine to supply its shale oil distillation plant before closing the shaft in 1950.

Fourneaux shaft in operation

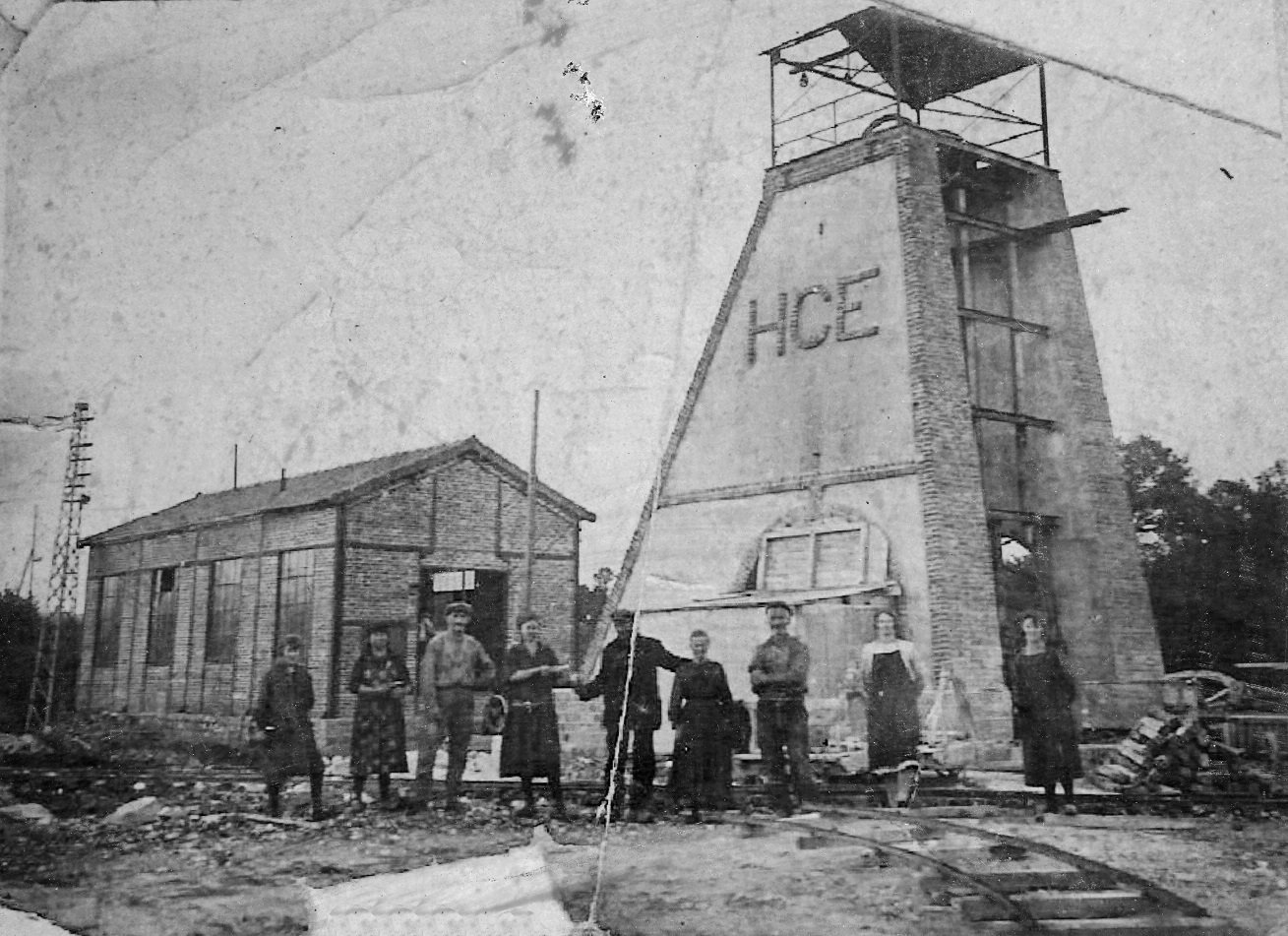

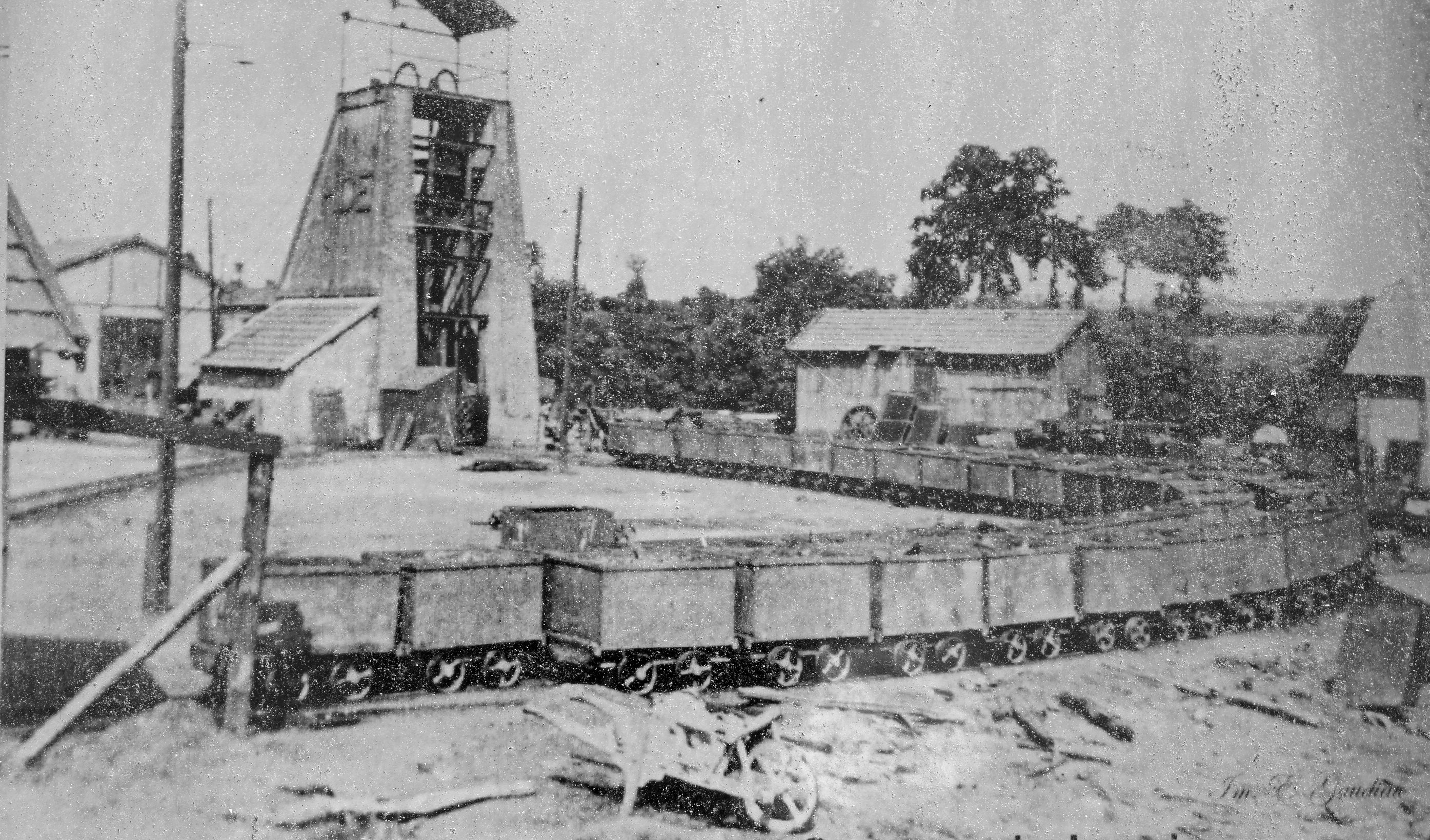

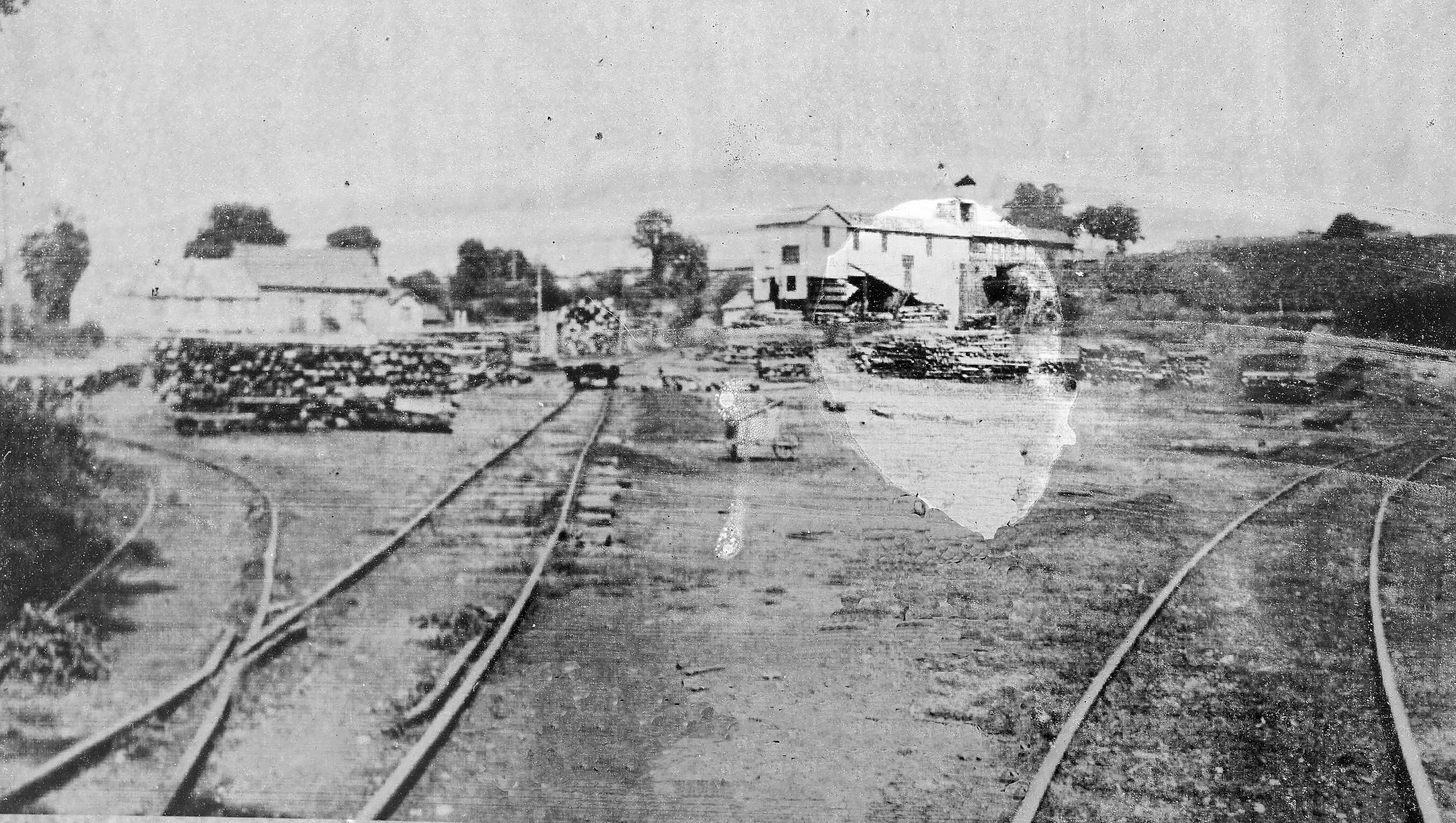
Remains of the Fourneaux shaft

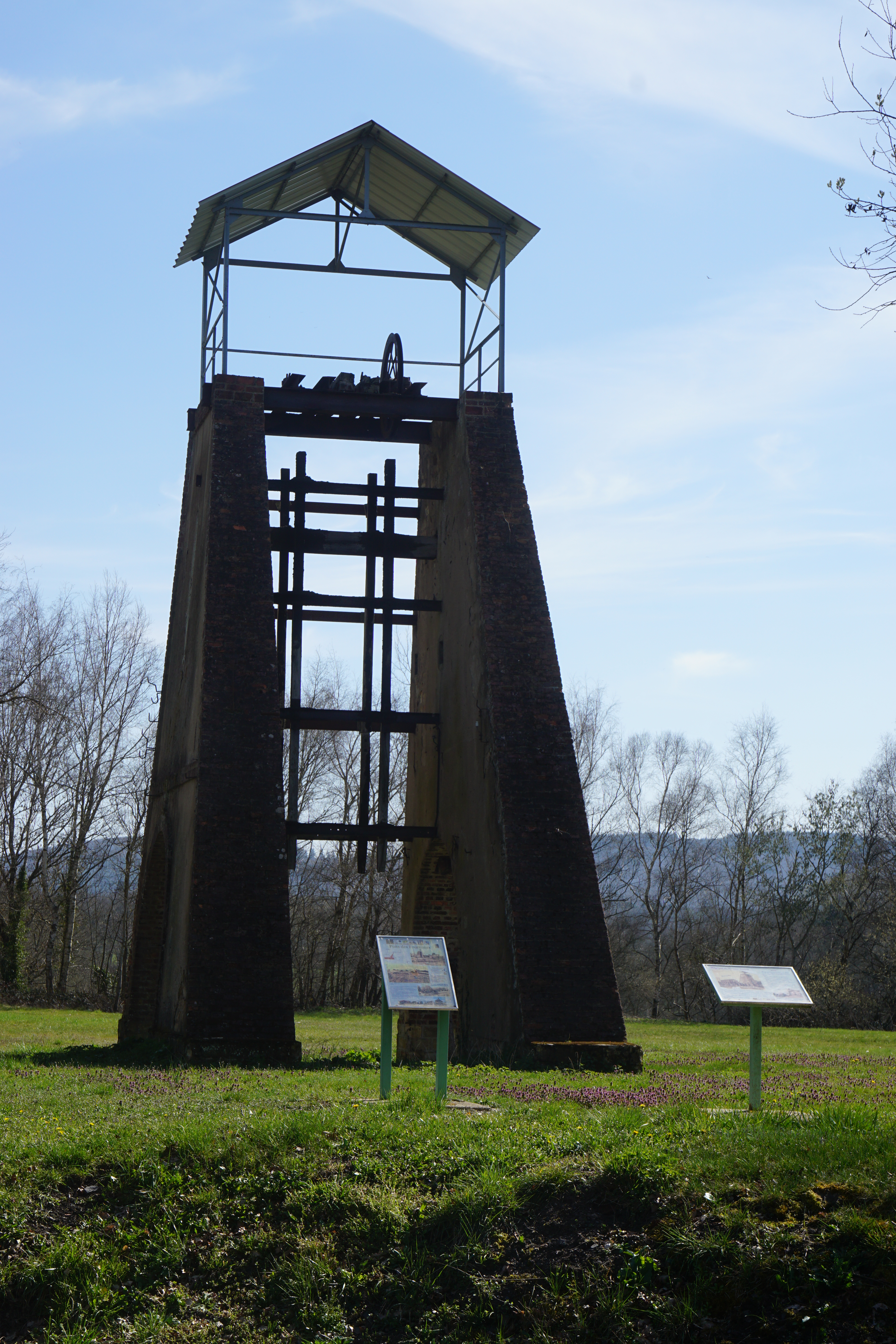
Informational panels.

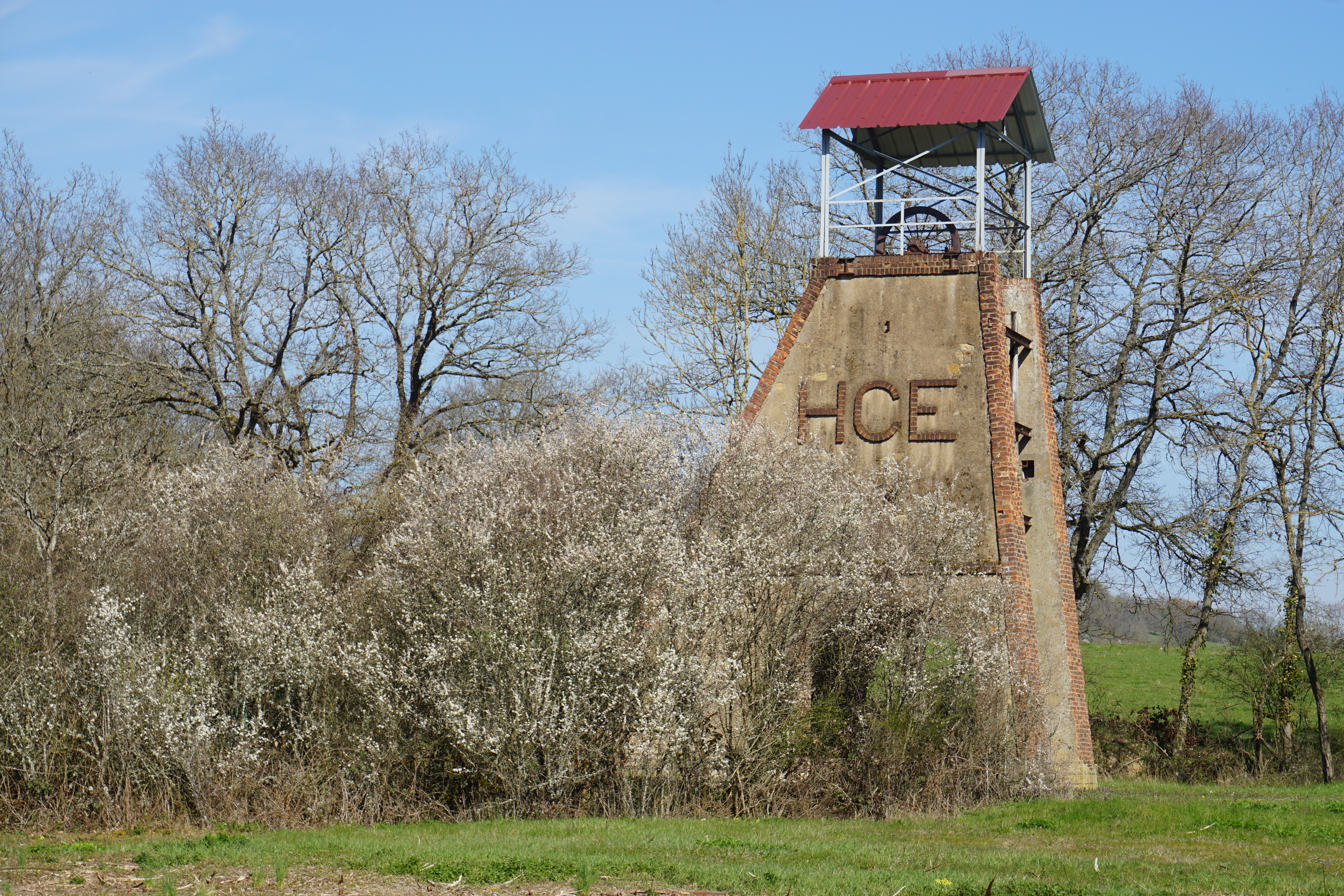
Distant view.

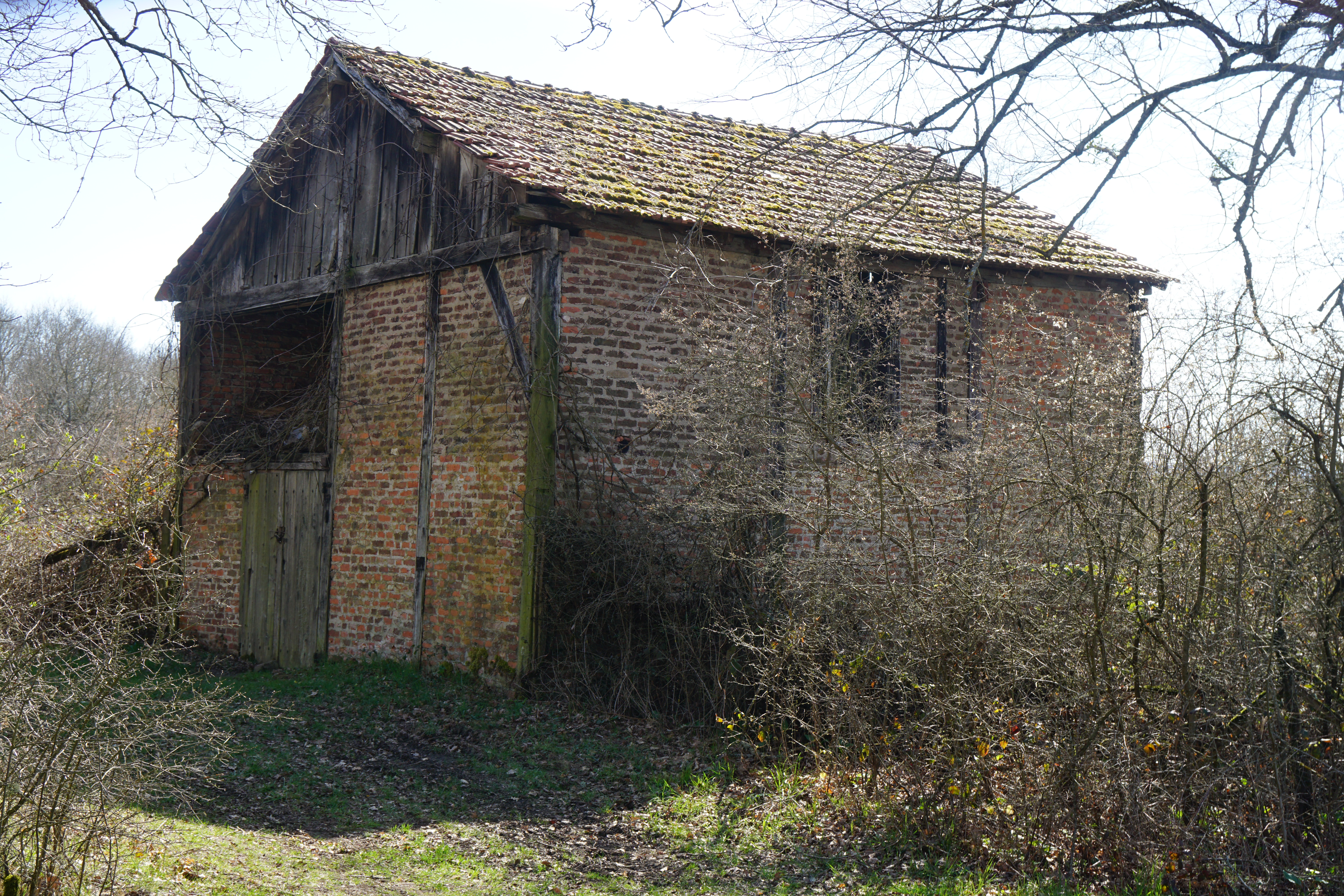
Annex building.

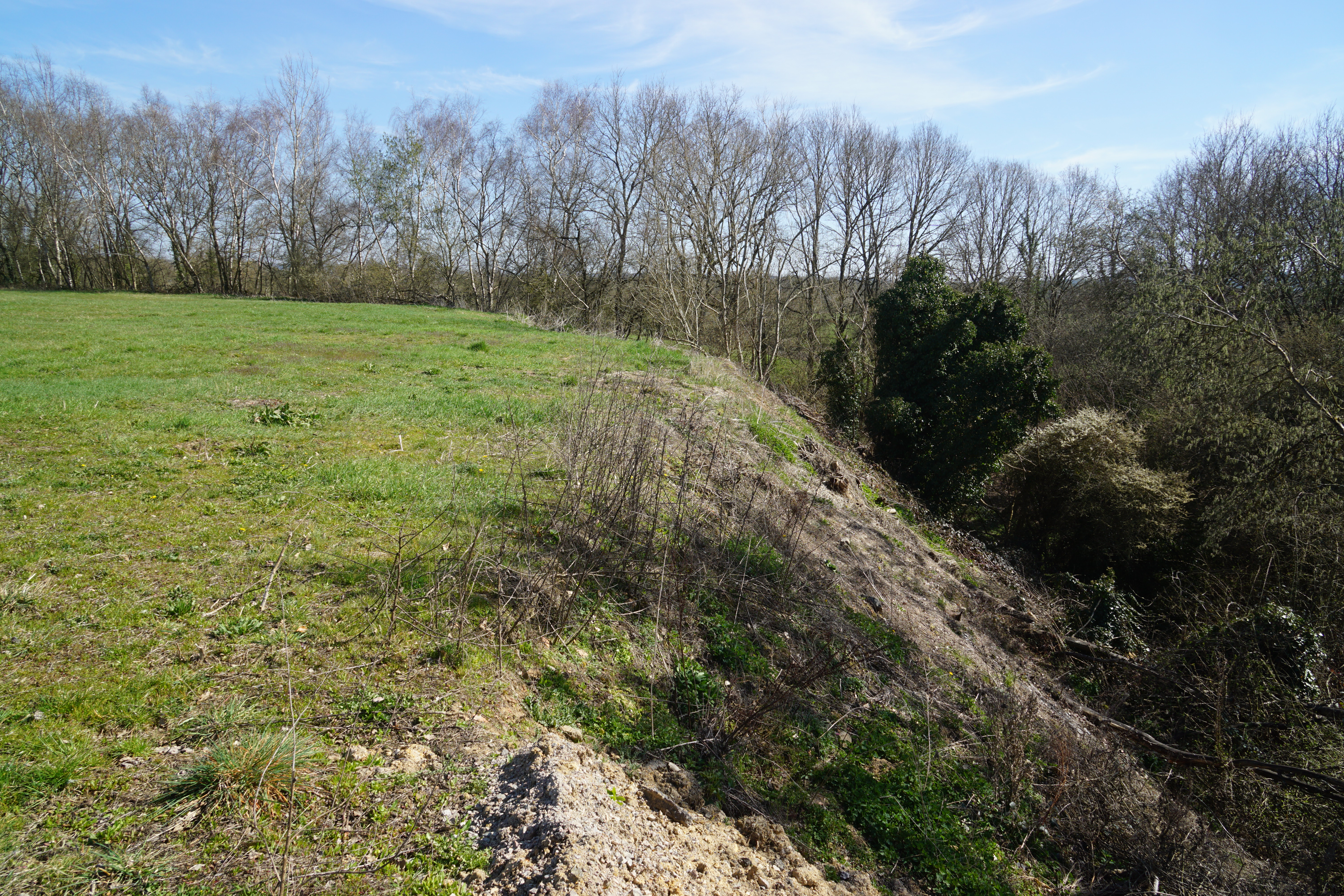
End of the spoil heap.

=== François-Mathieu shaft ===
The François-Mathieu shaft cuts through the coal seam at a depth of 700 meters in an otherwise unexplored basin area, without any geological disturbances.

Tailings from the François-Mathieu shaft

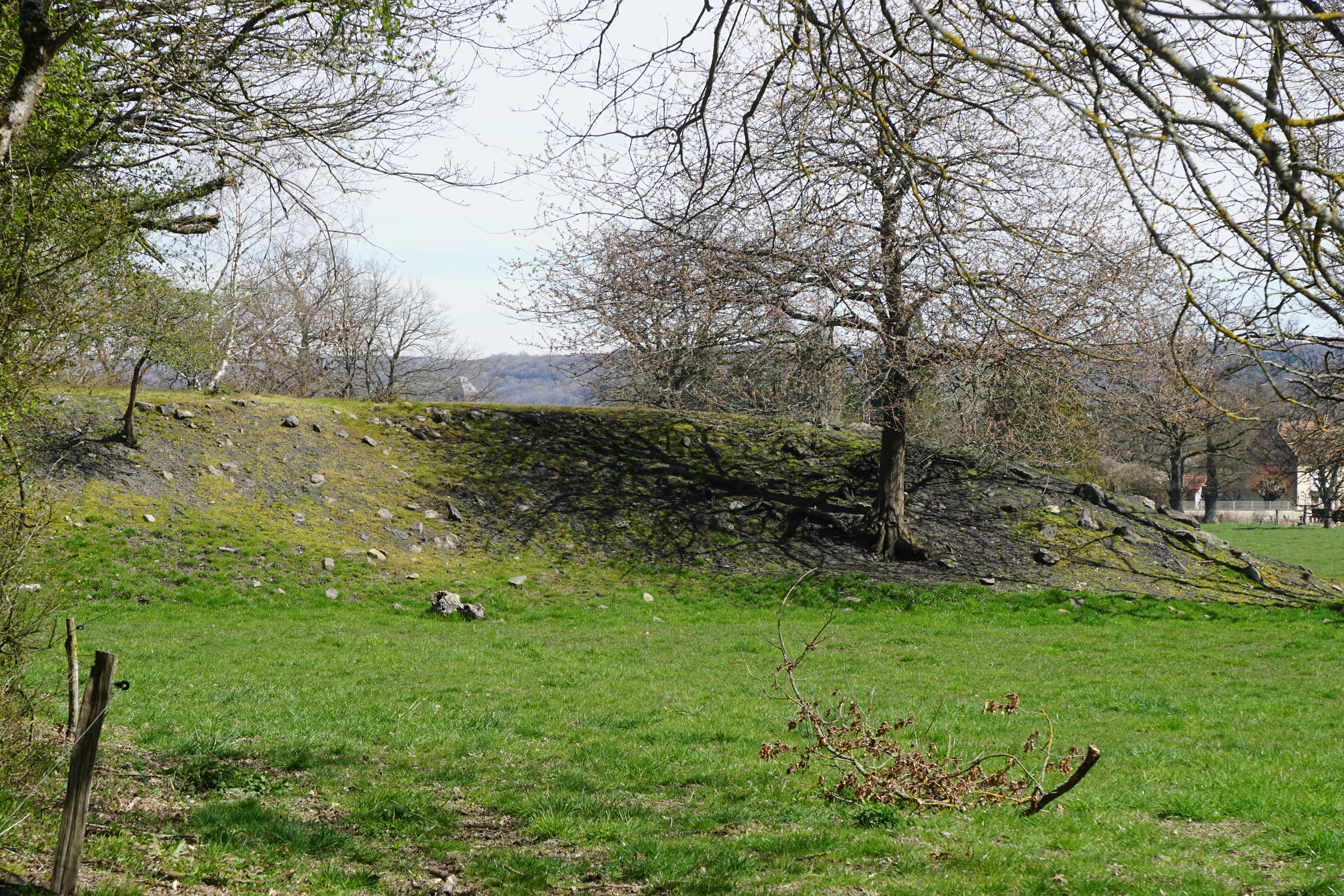

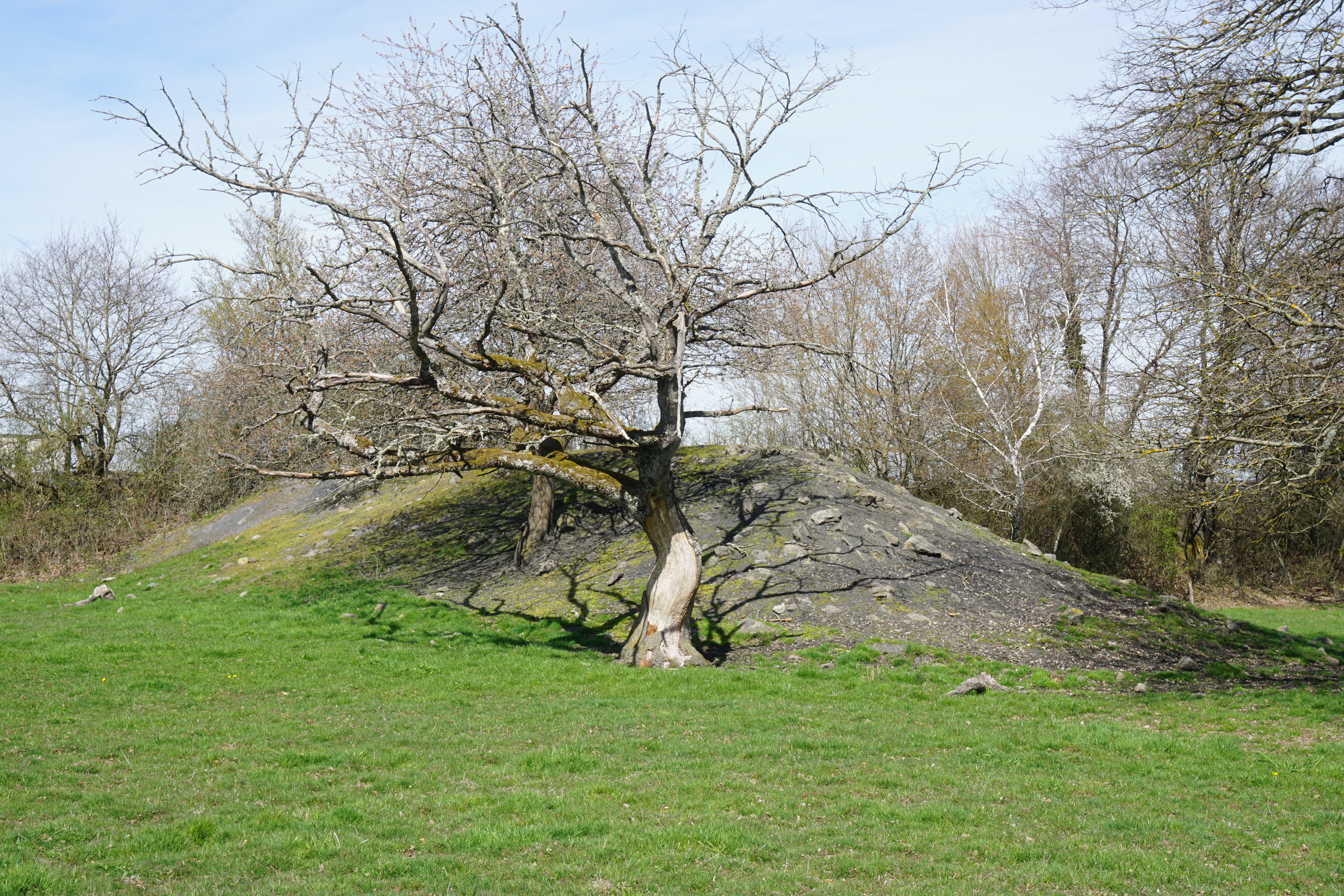

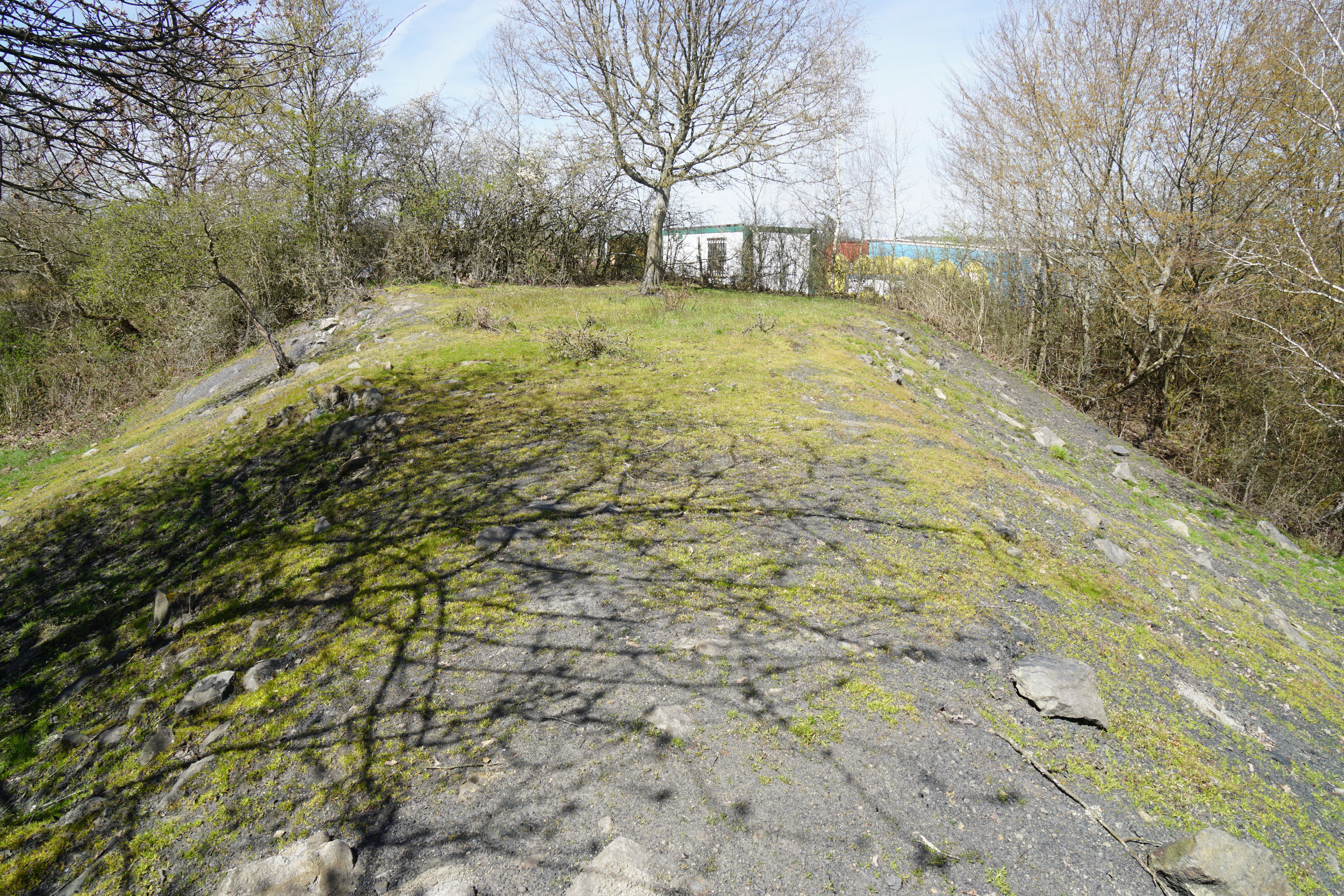

=== Caullet shaft ===
The Caullet shaft intersects the coal seam at a depth of 220 meters in a previously unexplored area of the mining basin, without any geological disturbances.

=== Mallet shaft ===
46°58′01″N 4°29′07″E

The Mallet shaft is located in the commune of Épinac, on the southern edge of the basin near the Drée stream. With a depth of 70 meters, it reaches the first coal seam at 14 meters.

Remains of the Mallet shaft

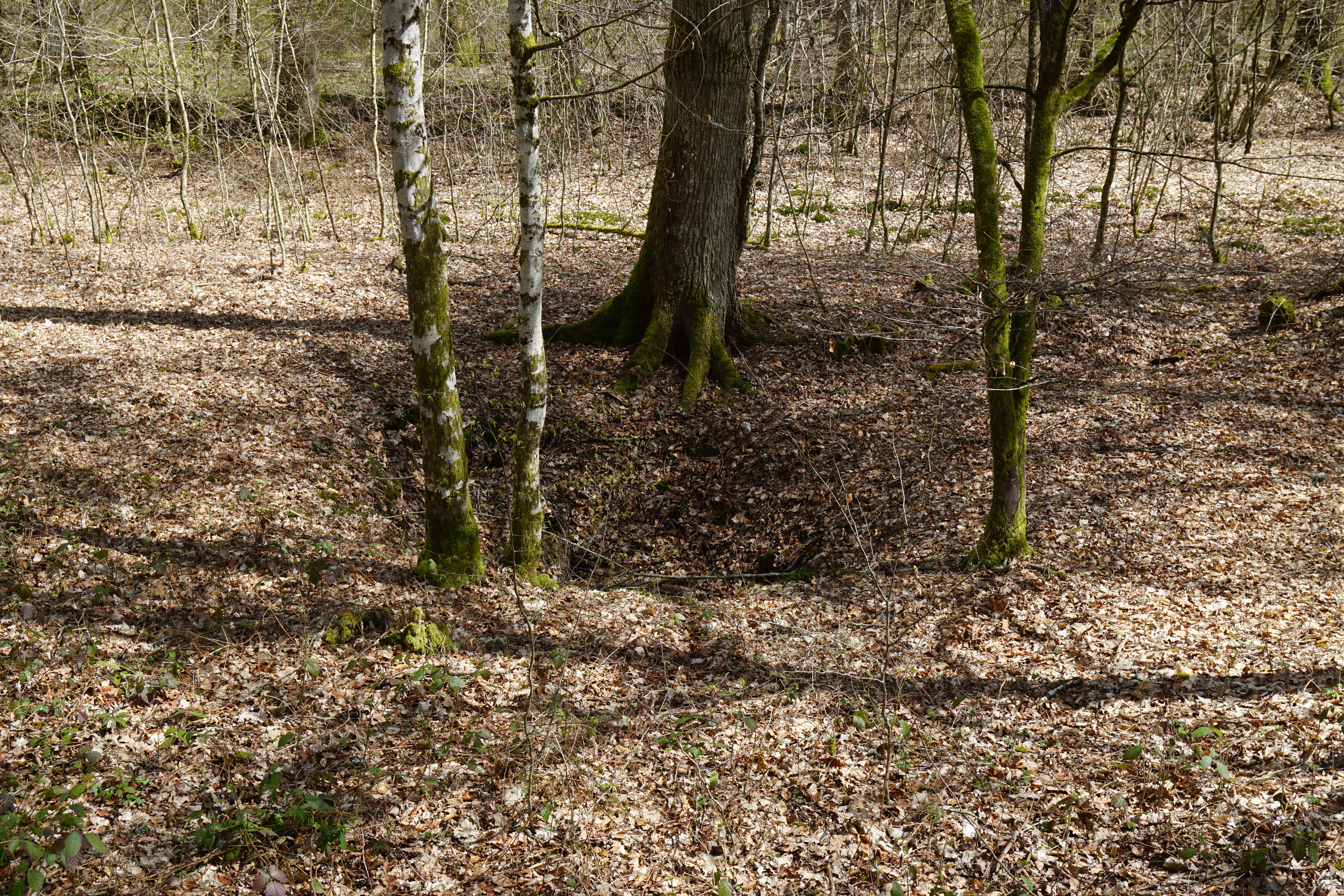
The funnel created by the shaft.

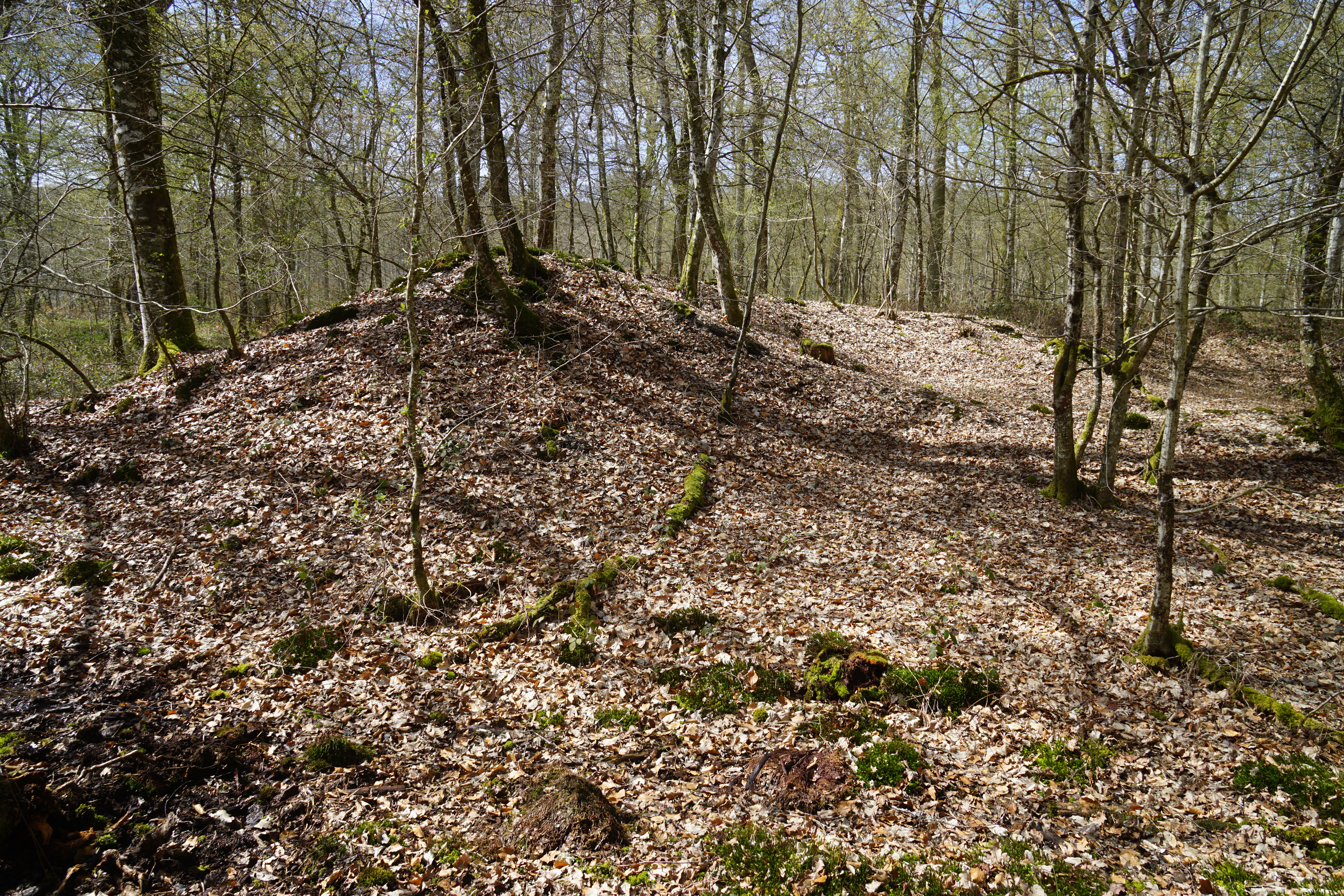
The spoil heap.

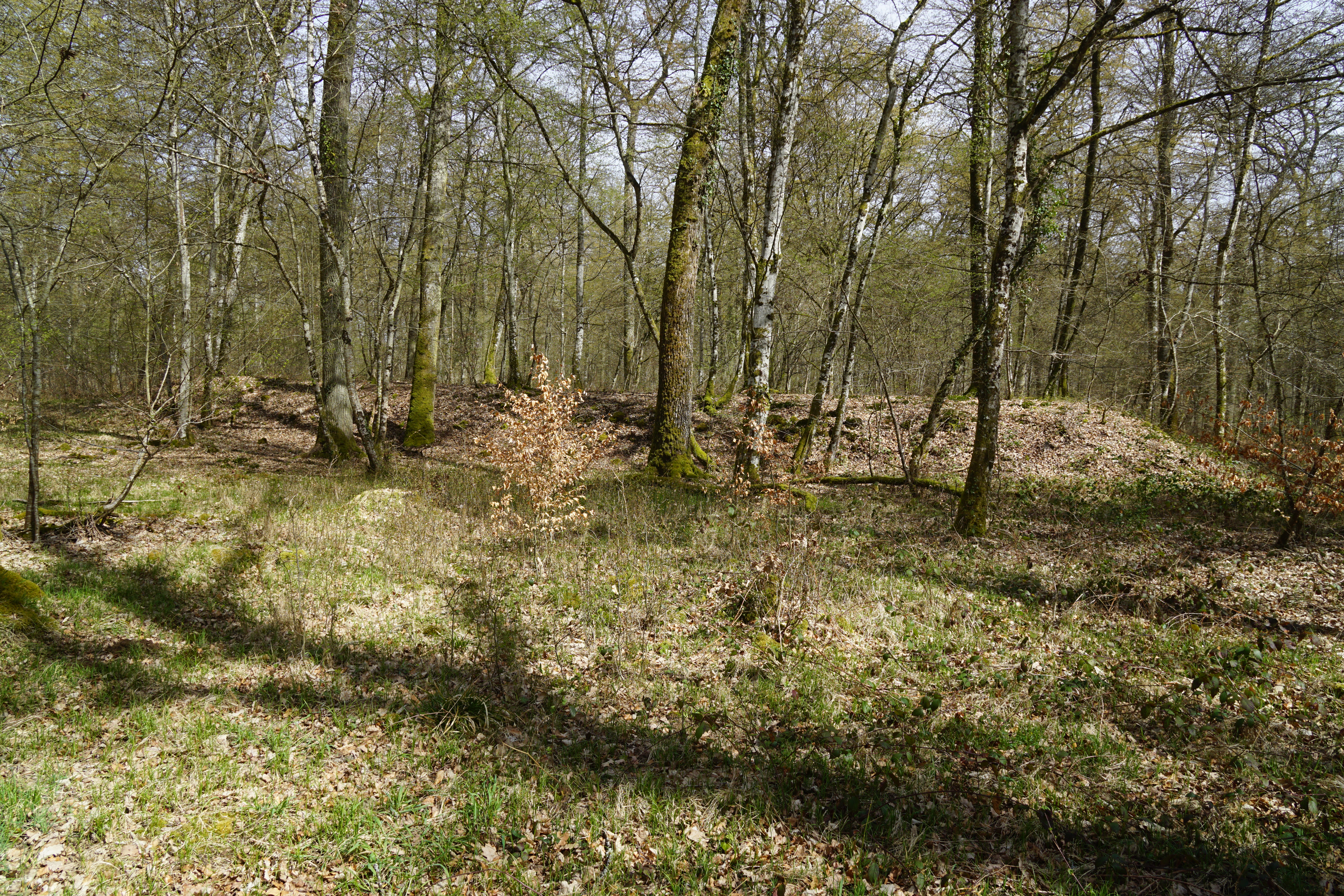
Distant view of the spoil heap.

=== Descenderie Saïd ===
Remains of the Descenderie Saïd

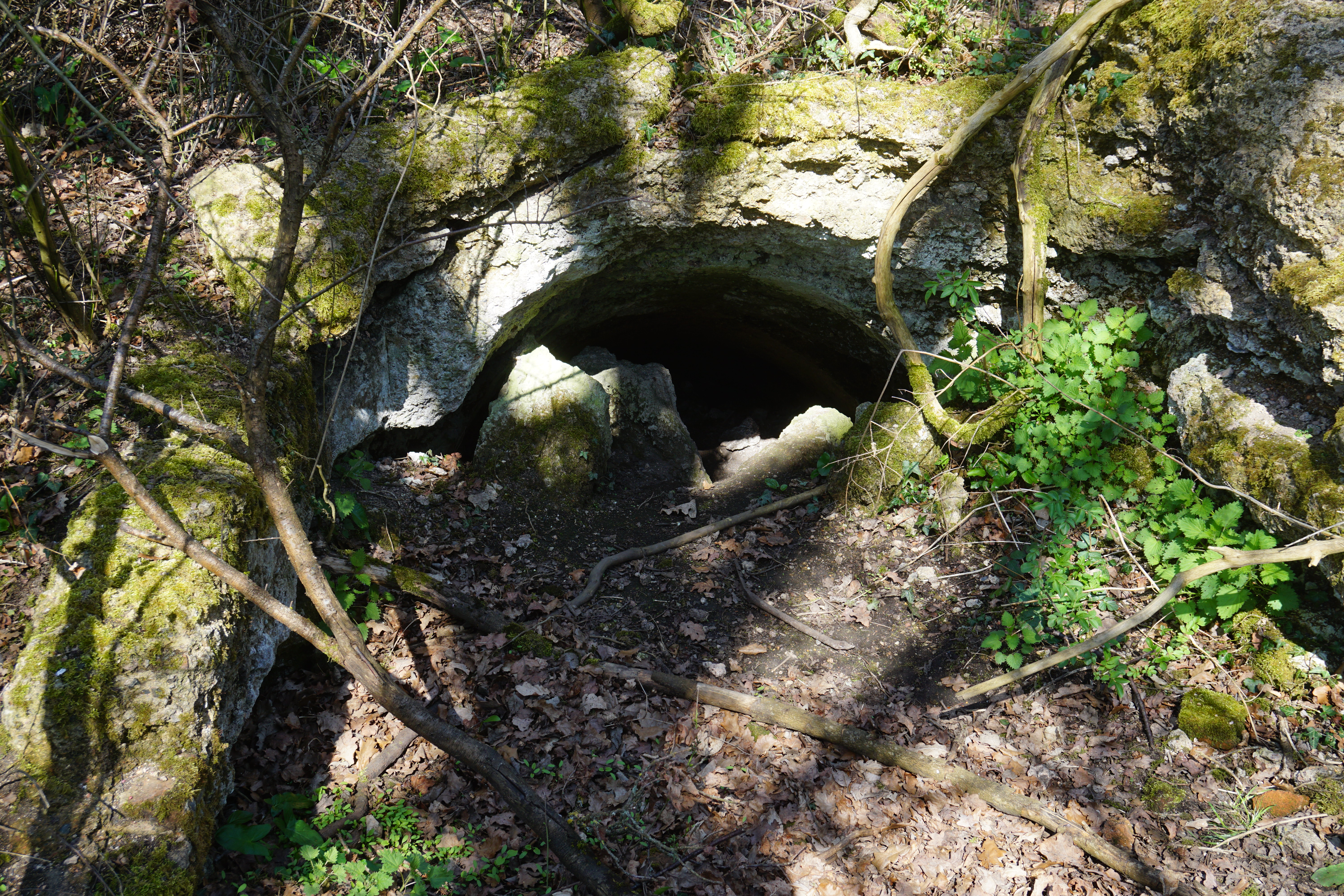
Entrance to the shaft.

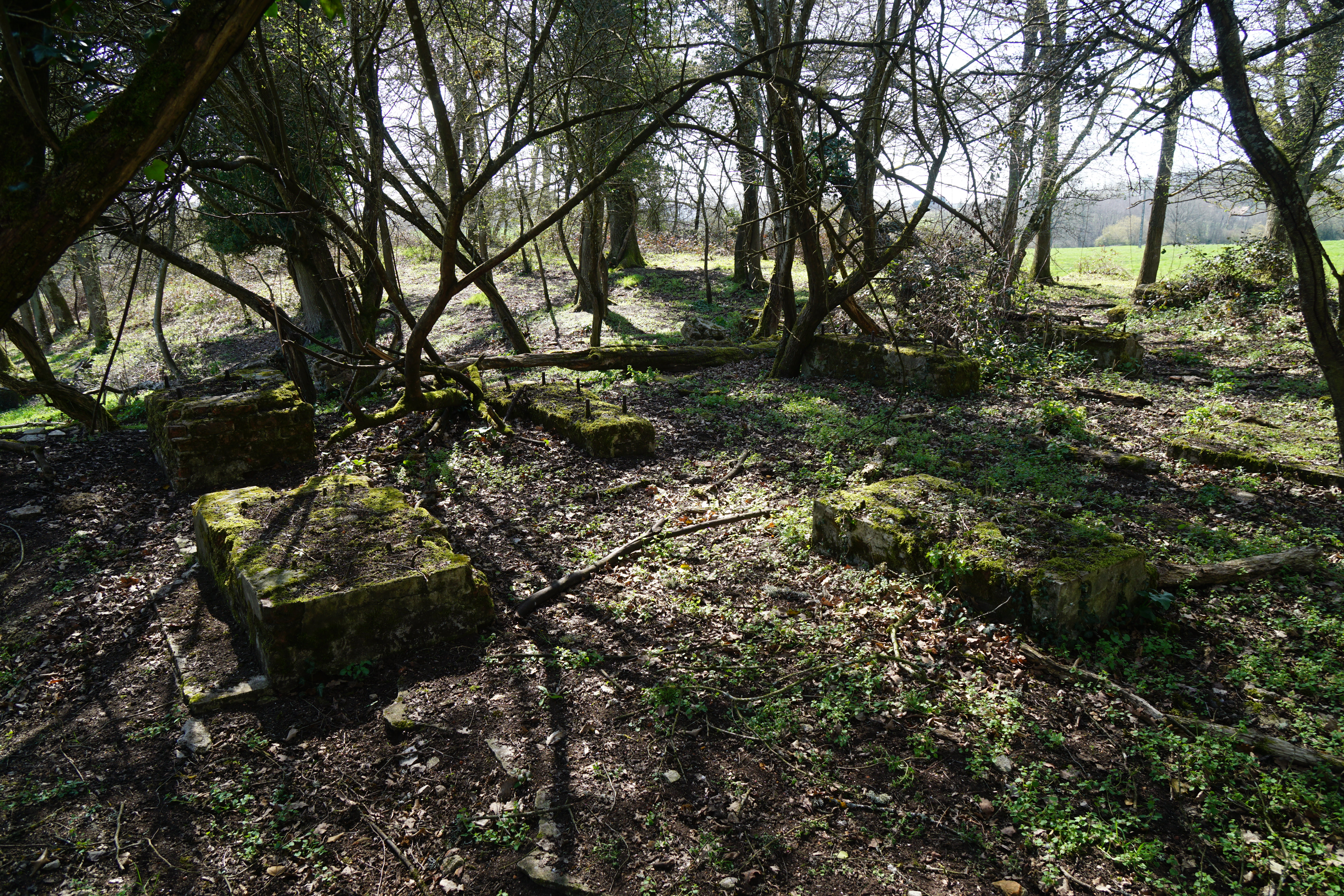
Ruins.

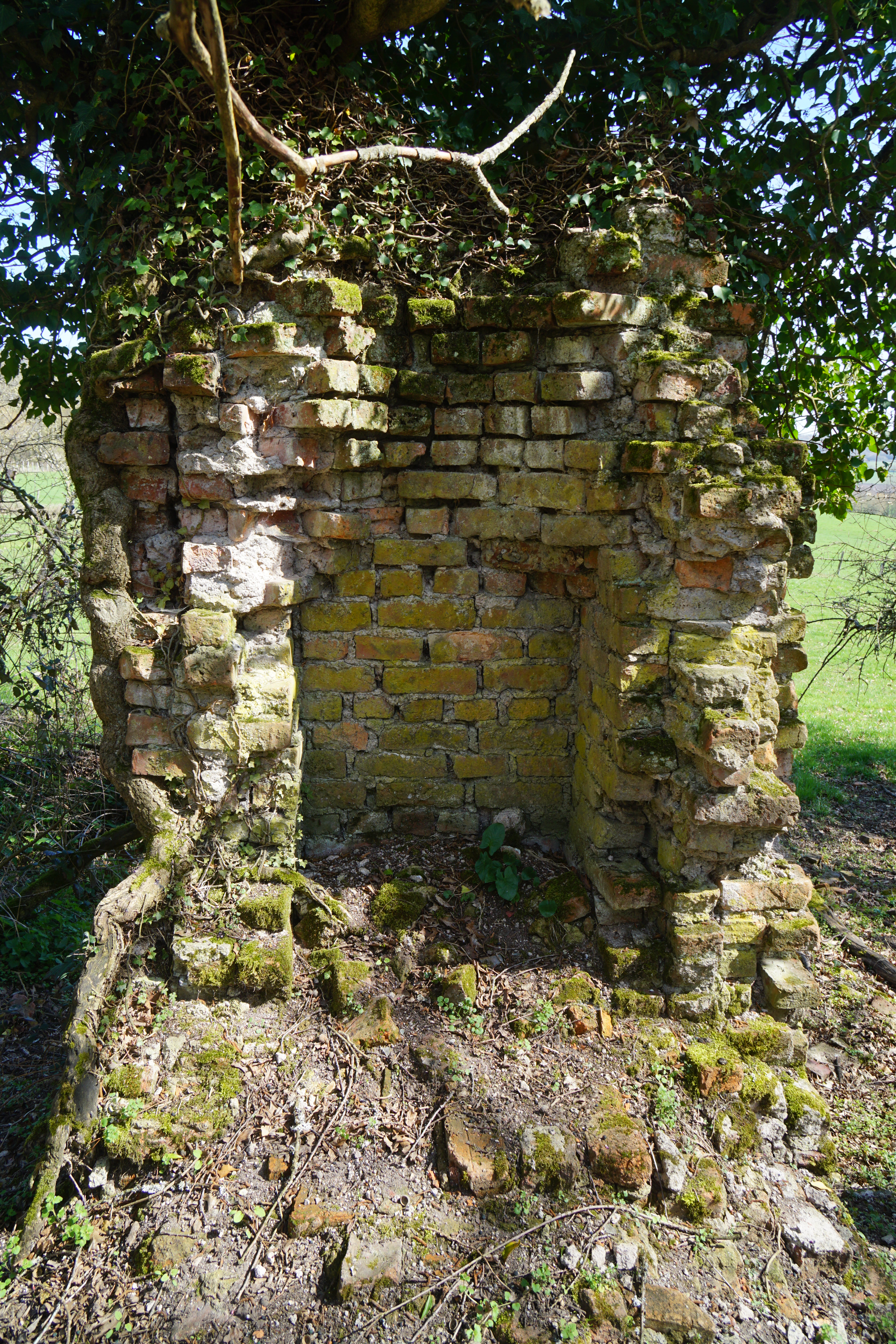

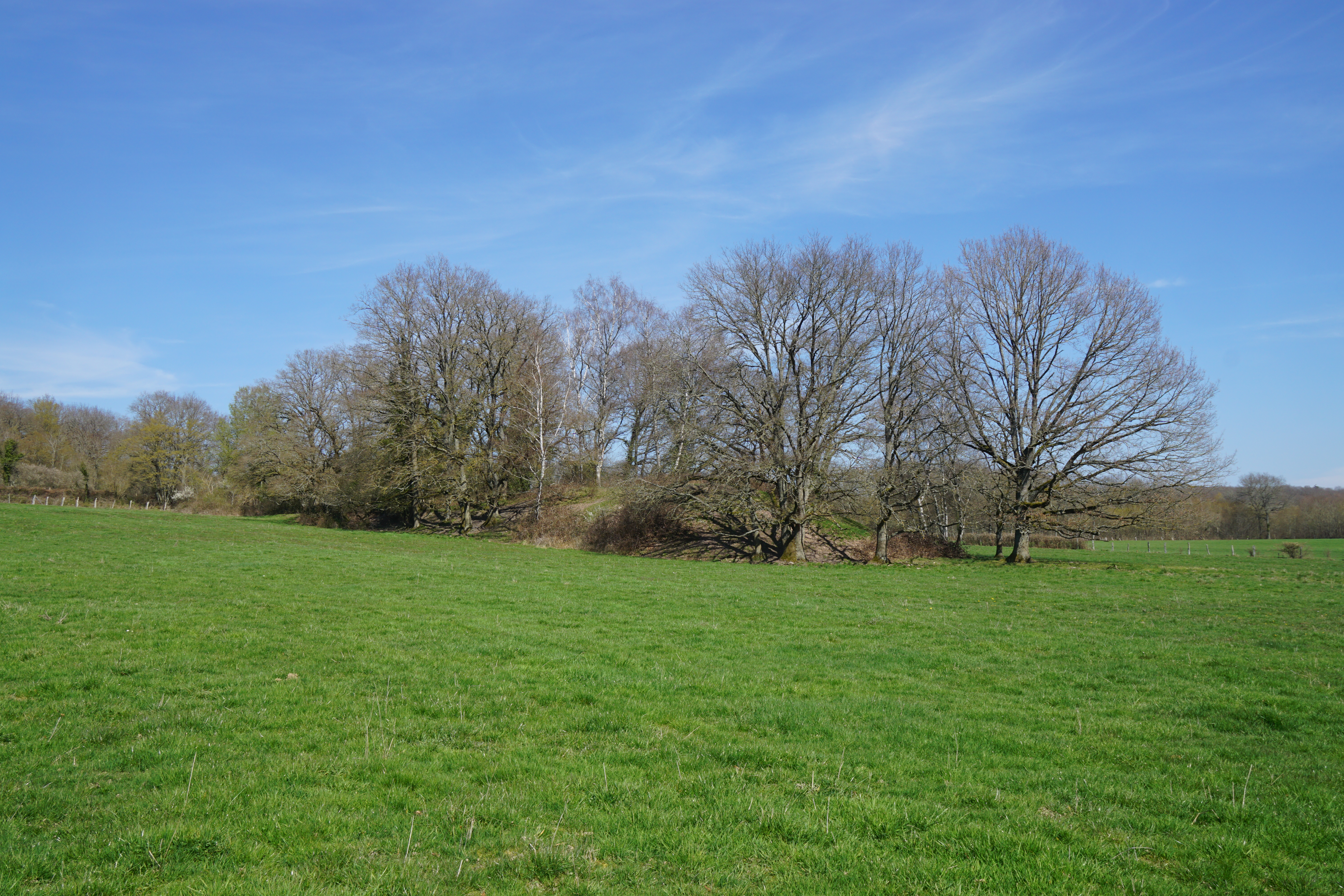
The spoil heap.

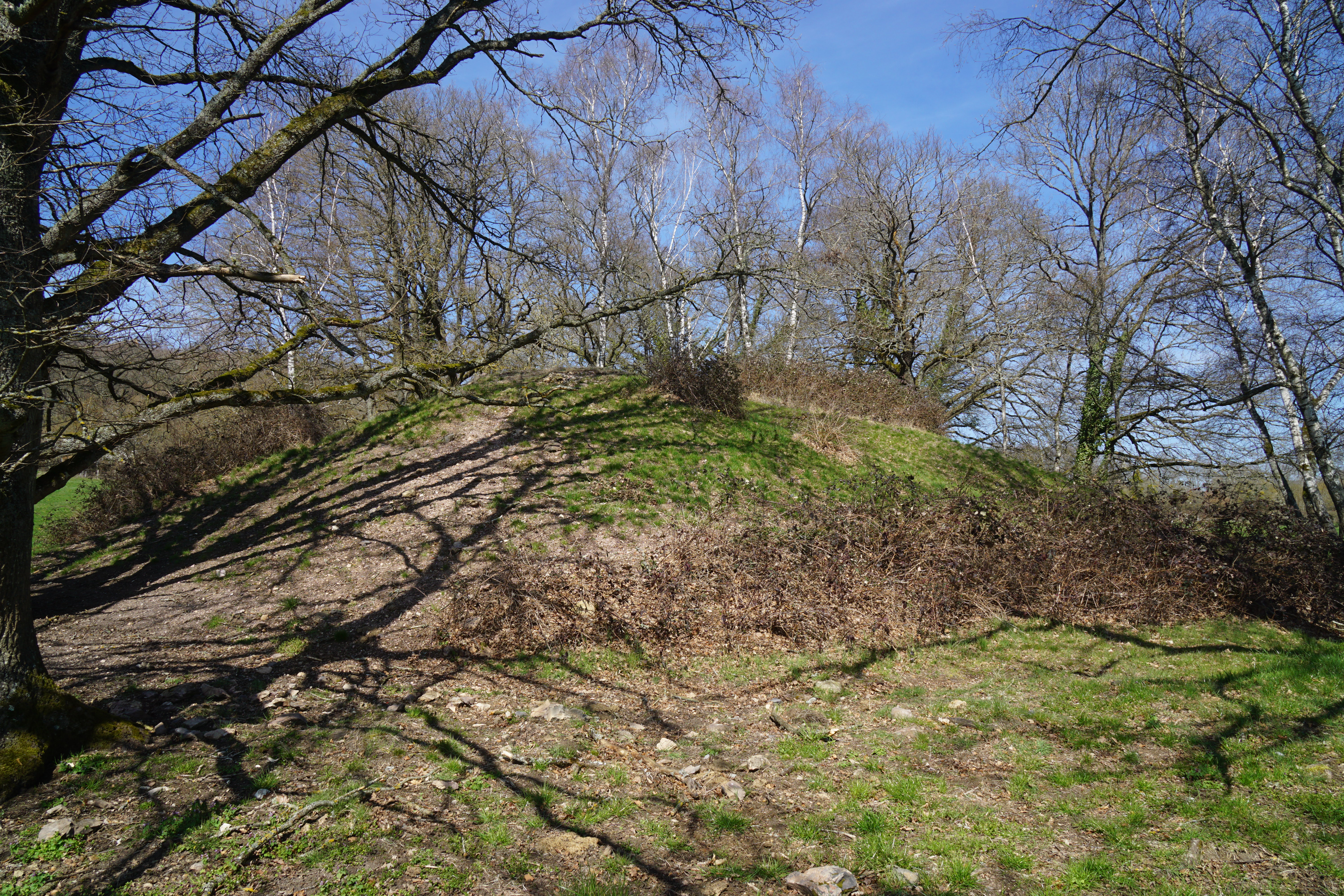

=== Descenderie Bathiard (site of Veuvrottes) ===
The Descenderie Bathiard, located in the hamlet of Veuvrottes, was the last active extraction site in the Épinac mining basin. It closed on February 28, 1966.

The Descenderie Bathiard in operation.
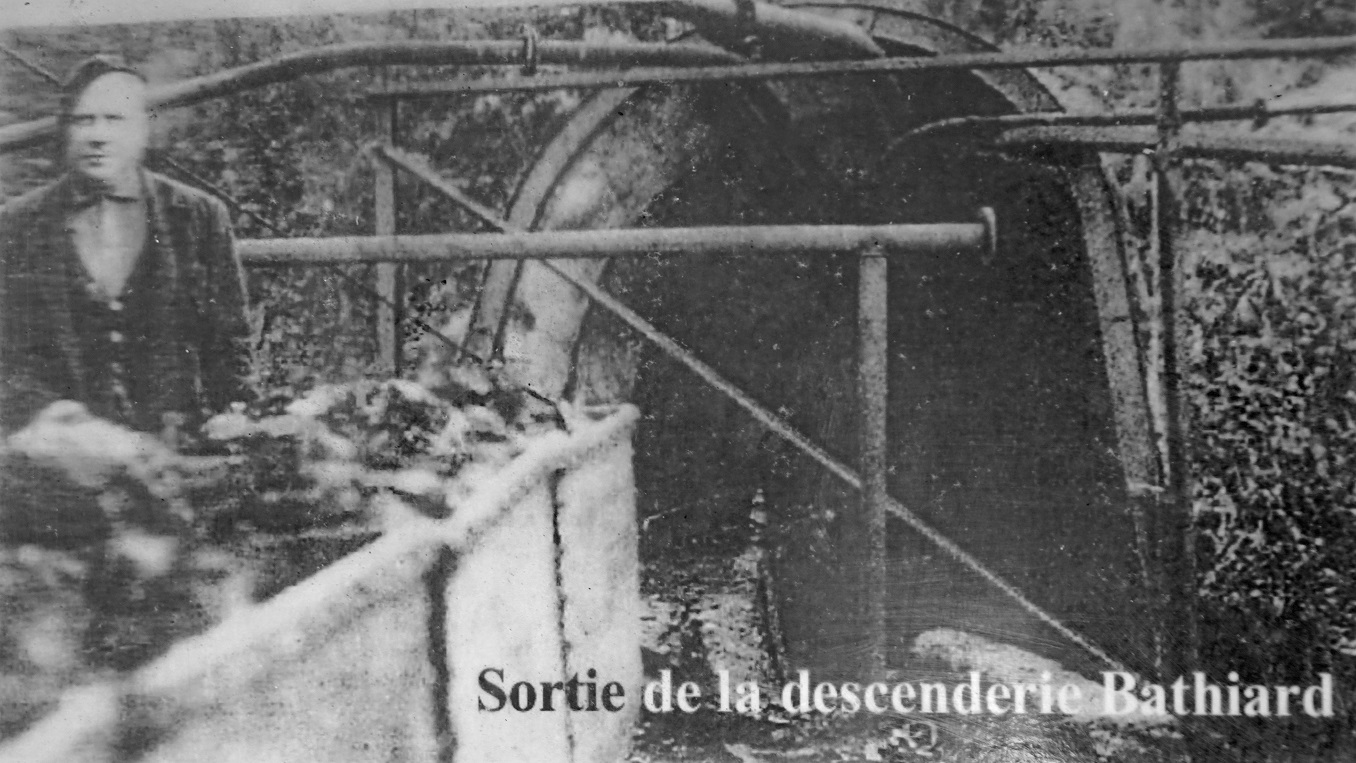
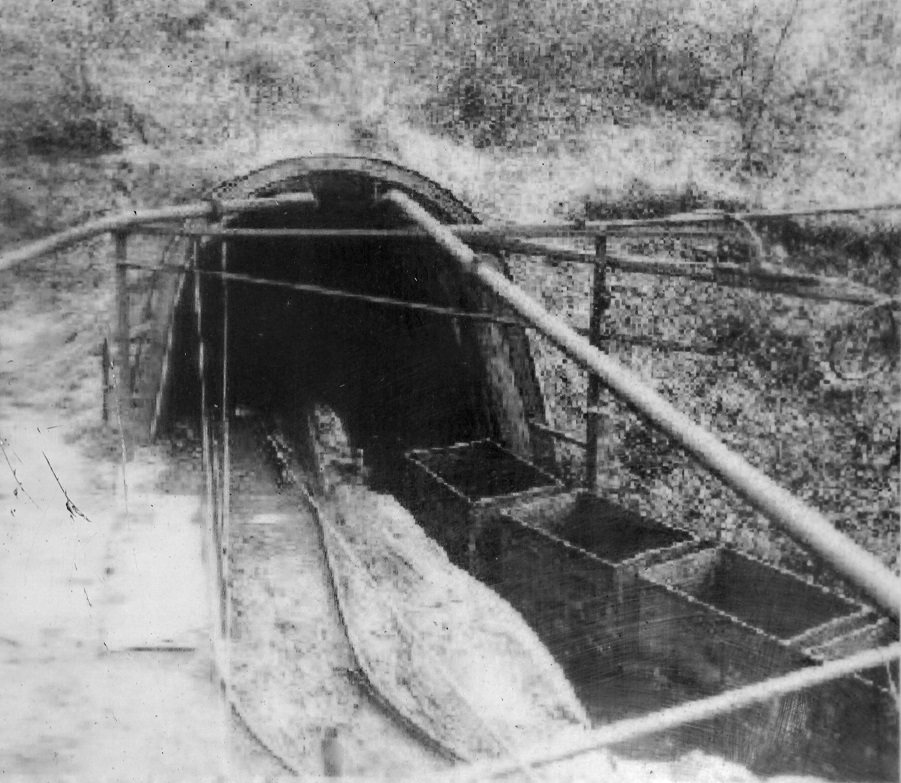
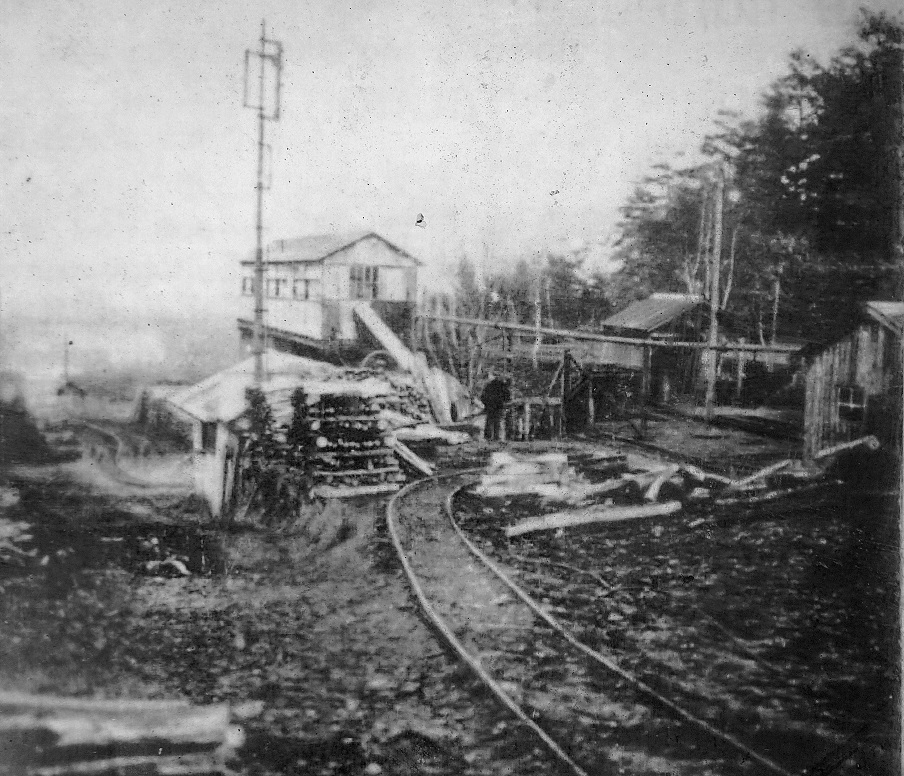
Remains of the Descenderie Bathiard.

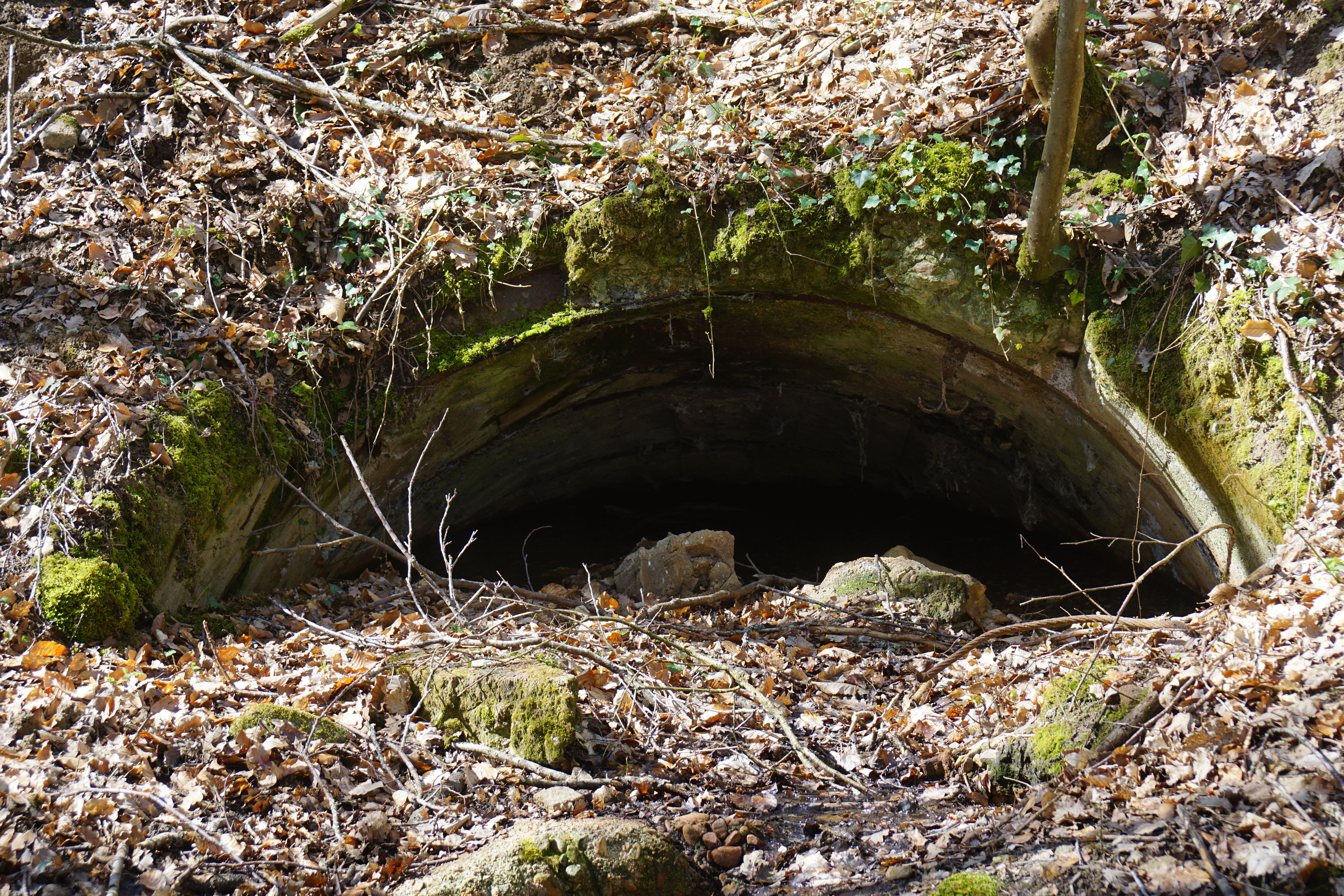
Entrance to the shaft.

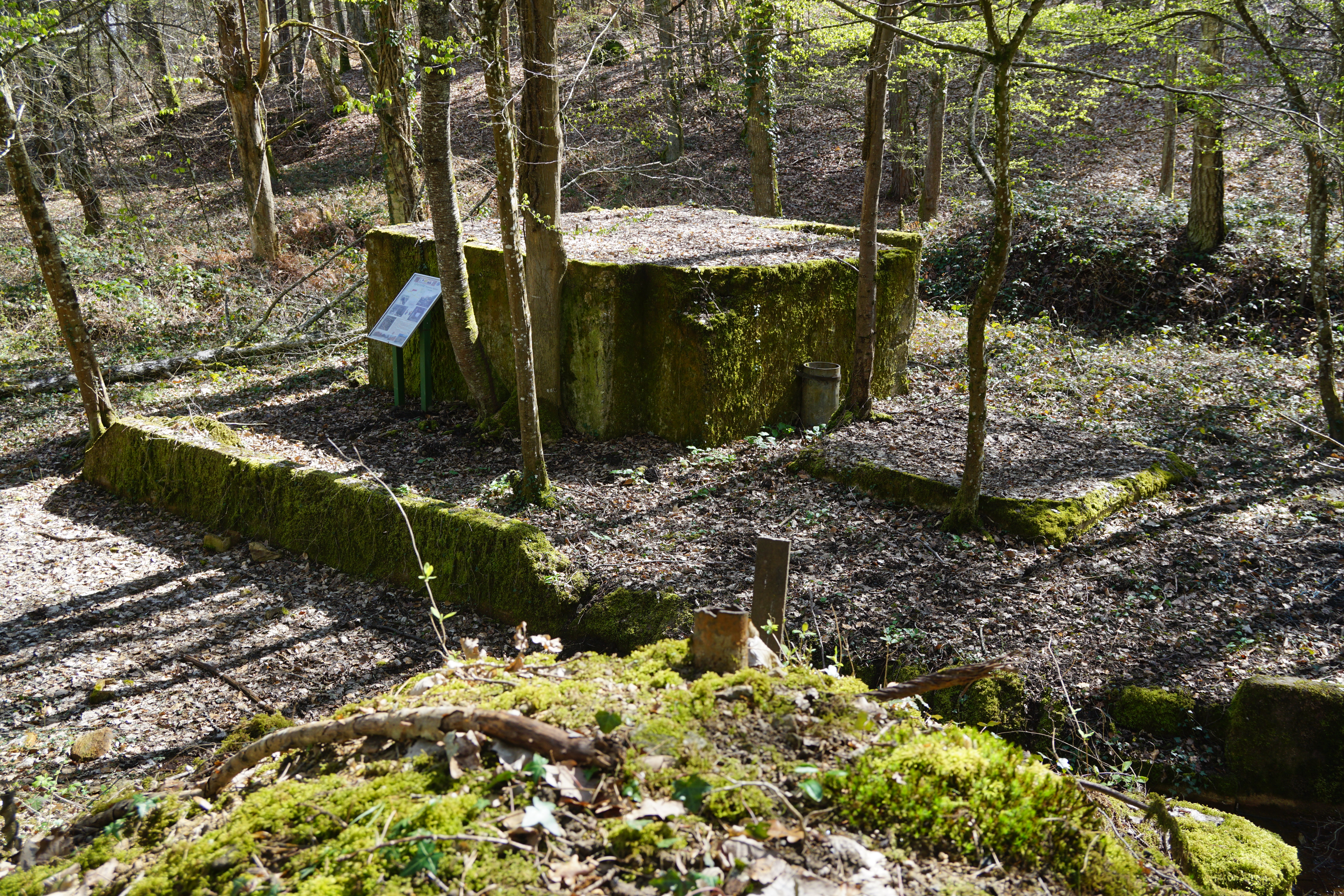
Hoist building.

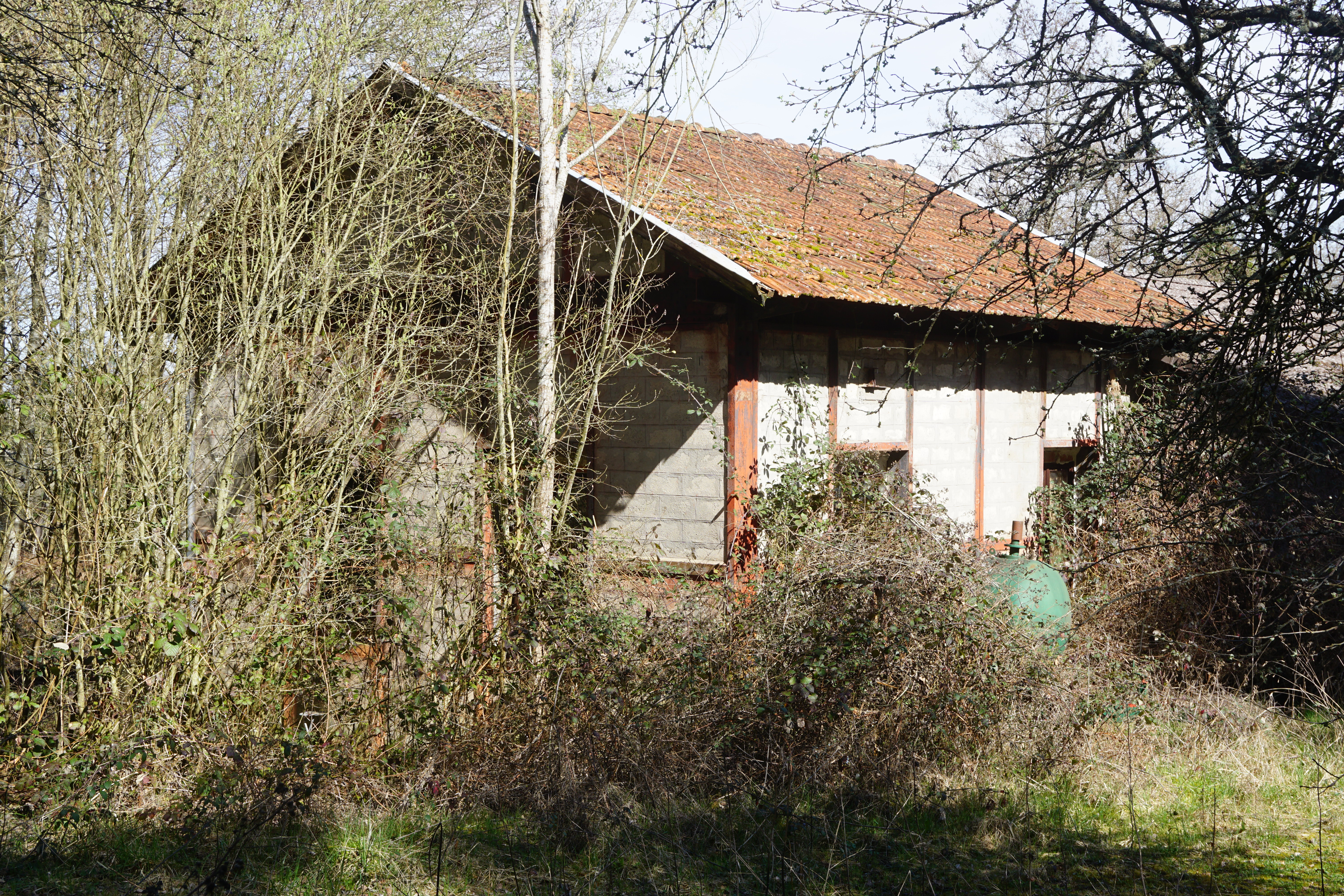
Annex building.

== Memory of the Mine ==
A museum dedicated to the coal mines, as well as the Épinac railway and the glassworks, is located beneath the town hall. It was planned to move to the old train station in 2019.

Museum of the Mine.

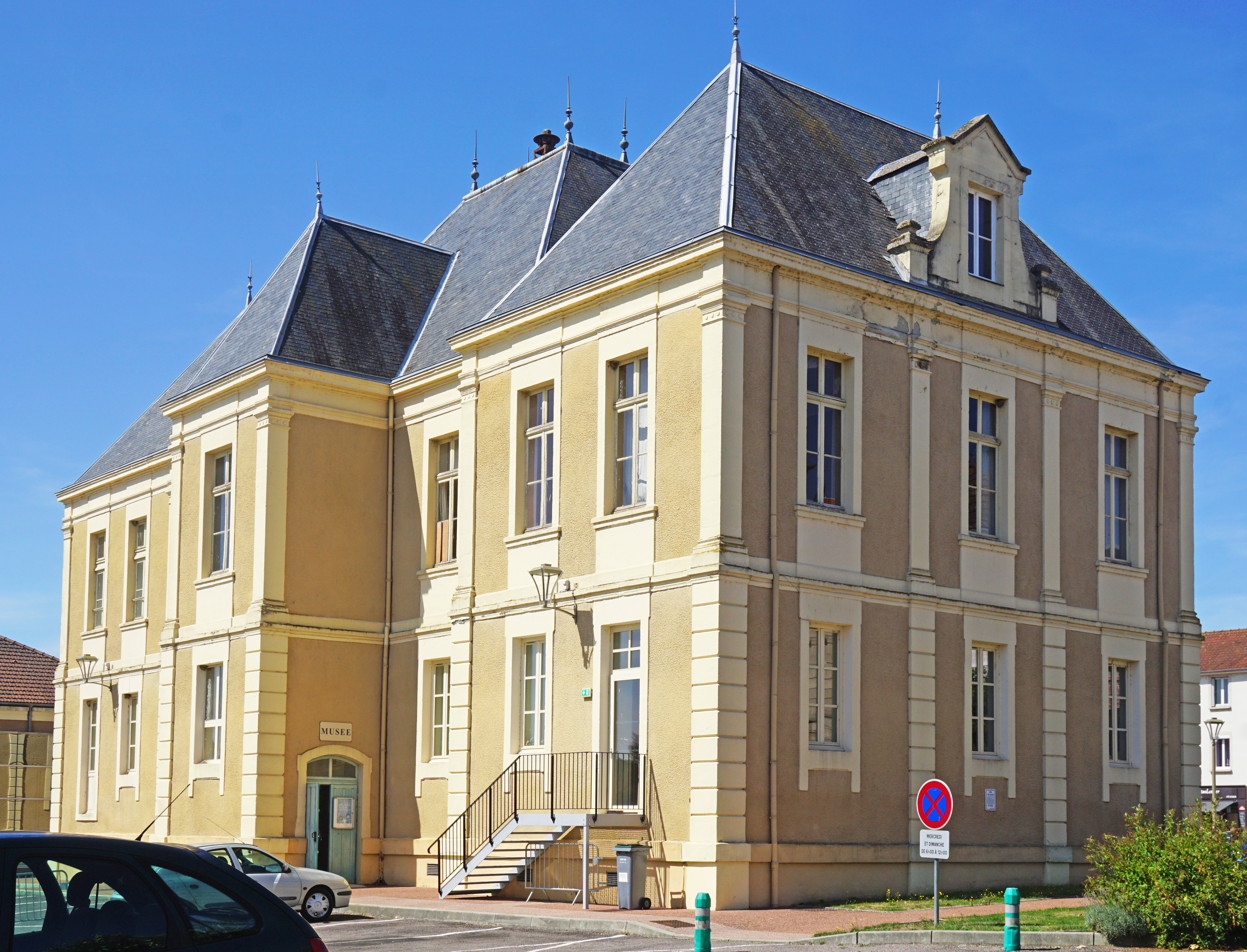
The town hall building.

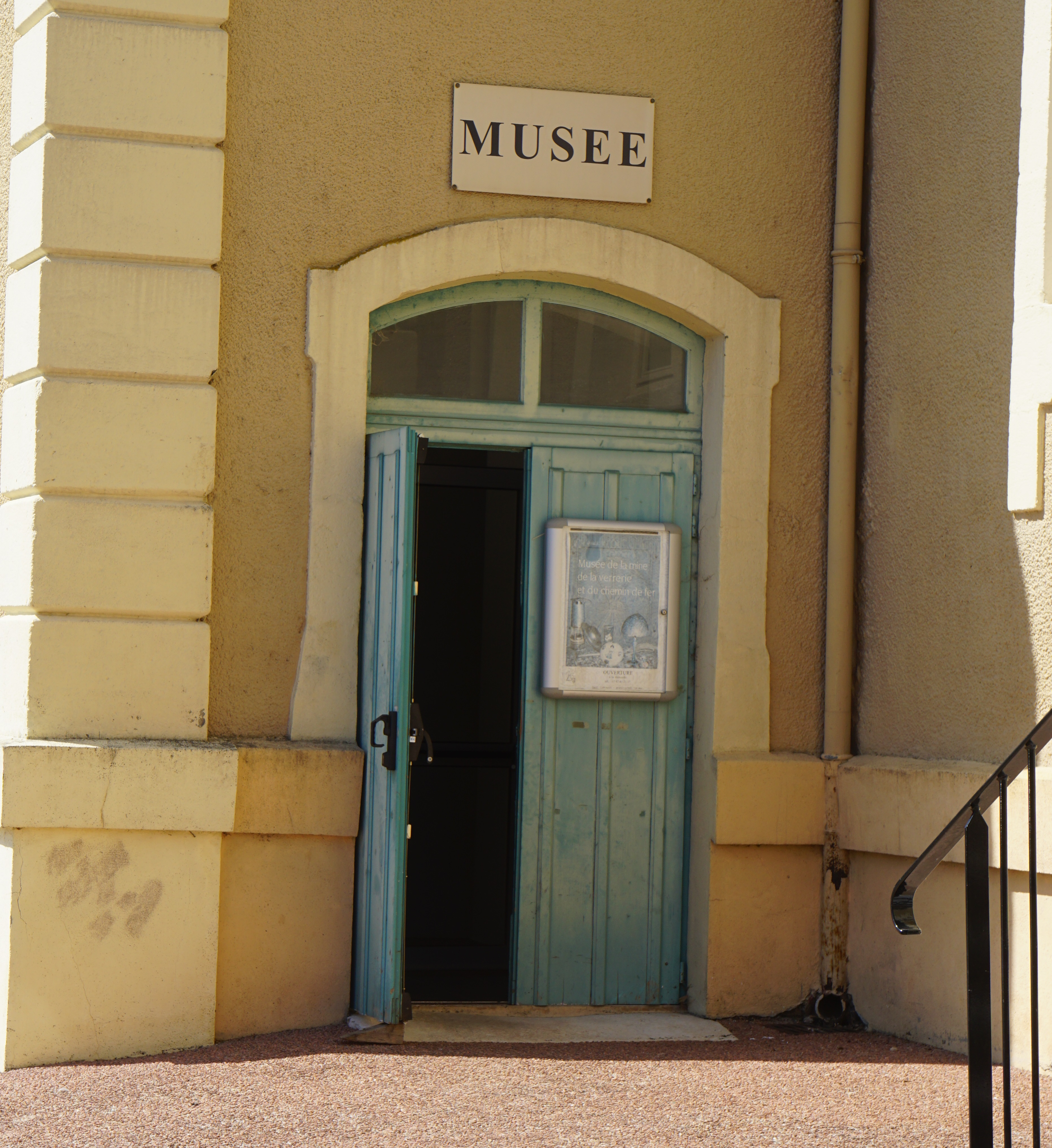
Entrance behind the town hall.

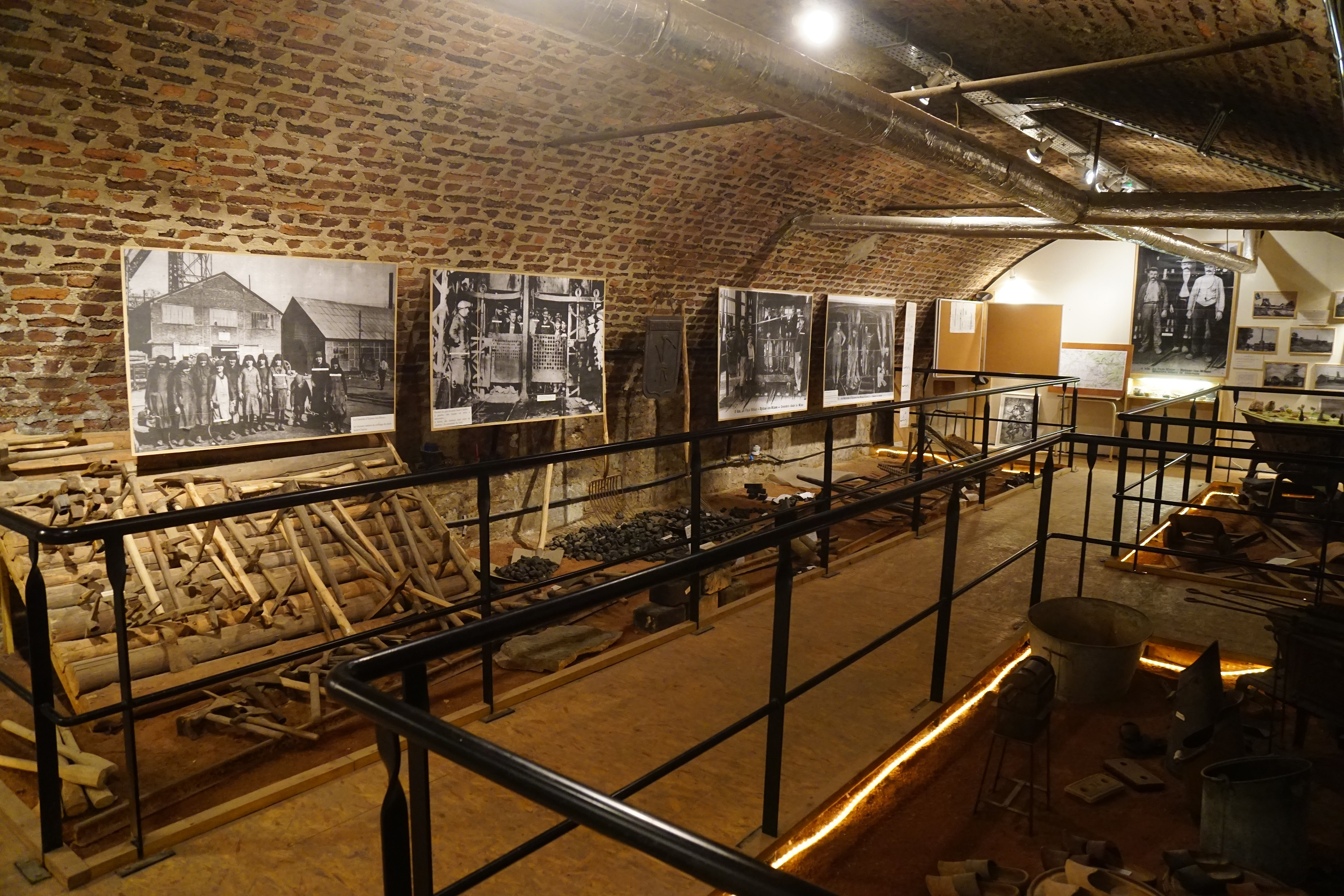
The museum is housed in the vaulted cellar under the town hall.

Guided tours of the commune (3 km) allow visitors to explore the Hottinguer shaft, the Garenne workers' housing with its chapel, and a reconstructed miner's house. Finally, the "Circuit des Gueules Noires" (9.5 km) offers a tour of the ten main mines in the basin.

== See also ==
- Épinac
- Montchanin coal mine
- Sincey coal mines
- Decize coal mine

== Bibliography ==
- Le Goff, J (2013). Etude des aléas miniers dans le bassin d'Autun, Bourgogne (71) (exploitations de houille, schistes bitumineux et fluorine) : Communes de Autun, Barnay, Cordesse, Curgy, Dracy-Saint-Loup, Igornay, La Celle en Morvan, Monthelon, La Grande Verrière, La Petite Verrière, Reclesne, Saint Forgeot, Saint Léger du Bois, Sully et Tavernay [Study of mining hazards in the Autun basin, Burgundy (71) (hard coal, bituminous shale and fluorite mining): Communes of Autun, Barnay, Cordesse, Curgy, Dracy-Saint-Loup, Igornay, La Celle en Morvan, Monthelon, La Grande Verrière, La Petite Verrière, Reclesne, Saint Forgeot, Saint Léger du Bois, Sully and Tavernay.] (PDF) (in French). Vol. 1. Géoderis. Archived from the original (PDF) on April 17, 2021.
- Passaqui, Jean-Philippe; Chabard, Dominique (2007). Les routes de l'énergie : Epinac, Autun, Morvan [Energy routes: Epinac, Autun, Morvan] (in French). Muséum d'histoire naturelle d'Autun.
- Guillard, Pierre-Christian; Chabard, Dominique (1993). Les chevalements des houillères Françaises [French coal mine headframes] (in French). Fichous, Pierre-Christian Guillard. ISBN 2-9502503-6-X.
- Raymond, C (1982). Synthèse géologique sur les ressources charbonnières de la Bourgogne [Geological synthesis of Burgundy's coal resources] (PDF) (in French). BRGM. Archived from the original (PDF) on April 4, 2023.
- Feys, R (1945). Puits et sondage dans le bassin d'Autun et Epinac, des origines à nos jours [Wells and boreholes in the Autun and Epinac basin, from the origins to the present day] (PDF) (in French). BRGM. Archived from the original (PDF) on April 12, 2023.
- Ecole de Liège (1881). Revue Universelle des Mines, de la Métallurgie, des Travaux ... [Revue Universelle des Mines, de la Métallurgie, des Travaux...] (in French). Vol. 19.
