= Aubigny-la-Ronce =

- Commune
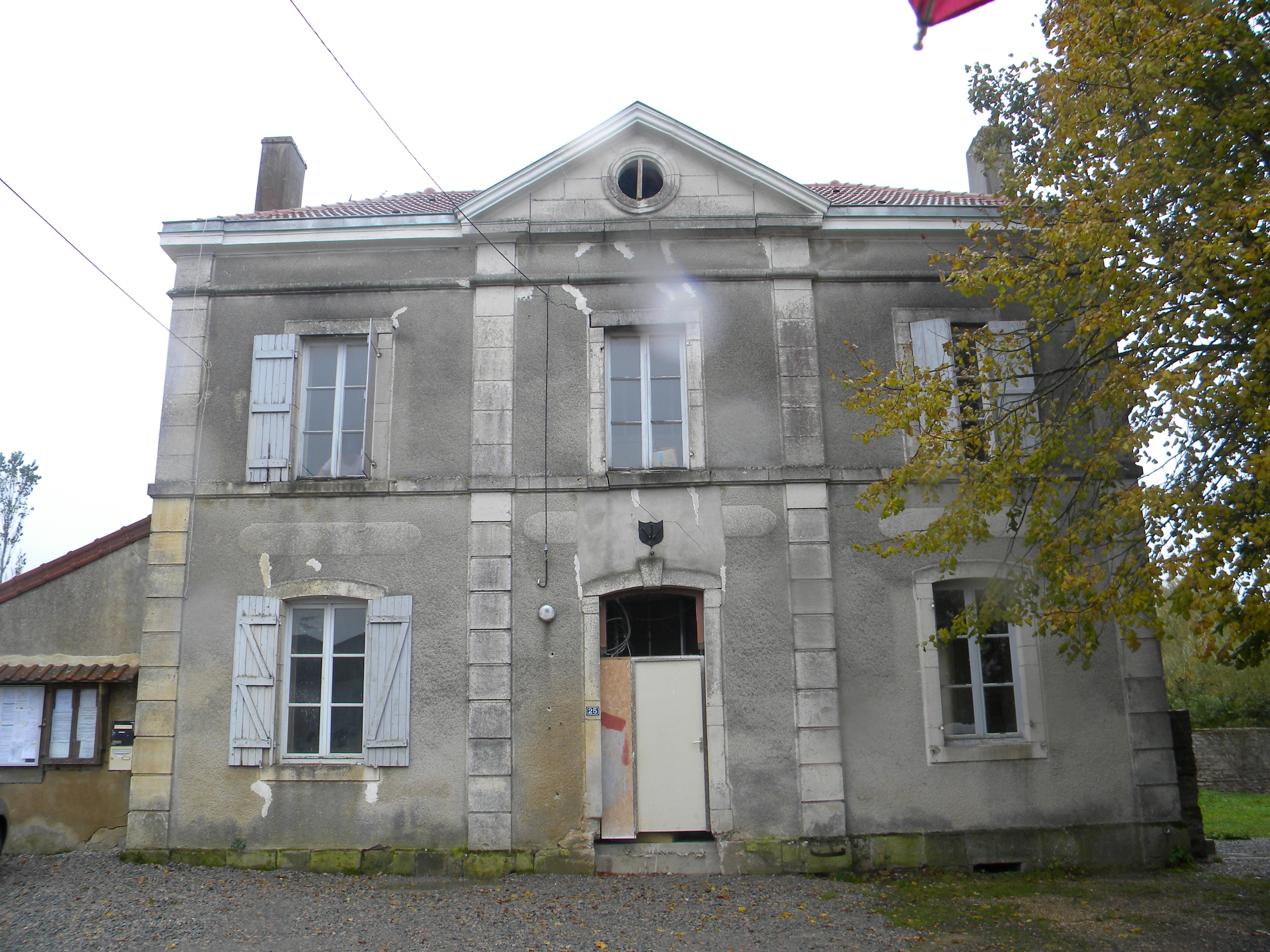
- The Town Hall
- Location of Aubigny-la-Ronce
- Location within France Location within Bourgogne-Franche-Comté
- Coordinates: 46°59′17″N 4°36′38″E
- Country: France
- Region: Bourgogne-Franche-Comté
- Department: Côte-d'Or
- Arrondissement: Beaune
- Canton: Arnay-le-Duc
- Intercommunality: CA Beaune Côte et Sud

Government
  - Mayor (2020–2026): Gérard Roy
- Area^{1}: 11.79 km^{2} (4.55 sq mi)
- Highest elevation: 546 m (1,791 ft)
- Lowest elevation: 355 m (1,165 ft)
- Population (2023): 172
  - Density: 14.6/km^{2} (37.8/sq mi)
- Time zone: UTC+01:00 (CET)
  - Summer (DST): UTC+02:00 (CEST)
- INSEE/Postal code: 21032 /21340
- ^{1} French Land Register data, which excludes lakes, ponds, glaciers > 1 km^{2} (0.386 sq mi or 247 acres) and river estuaries.

Aubigny-la-Ronce (French pronunciation: [obiɲi la ʁɔ̃s]) is a commune in the Côte-d'Or department in the Bourgogne-Franche-Comté region of eastern France.

== Geography ==
Aubigny-la-Ronce is located some 18 km south-west of Beaune and some 20 km east by north-east of Autun. The western border of the commune is the border between the departments of Côte-d'Or and Saône-et-Loire. Access to the commune is by the D33 road from Molinot in the north passing south down the eastern side of the commune and continuing to Nolay in the south. Access to the village is by the D33D road which branches west off the D33 in the commune, passes through the village, and continues west. Apart from the village there are the hamlets of Lavault in the north-west and La Chassagne in the south-west. Almost half of the commune is forested in the north-west with the rest farmland.

The Petit Drée flows from the north forming much of the north-western border and continuing south-west to join the Drée at Epinac. The Ruisseau de Roncevaux rises in the east of the commune and flows north-west forming part of the northern border before joining the Petit Drée on the commune border.

== History ==
In 1208 Robert, chaplain of Aubigny-la-Ronce, gave one fifth of the tithe of Aubigny to the Abbey of Saint-Martin of Autun to be used for alms. Gautier II, Bishop of Autun, ratified the act in August 1208. In 1260 Hugues, Lord of Aubigny, gave land. His son and his mother also made new donations to be used for charity in 1263. Jean de Volnay, Equerry, also gave a fief in 1262. In the same year the lord of Aubigny paid homage for a fief that he held for the Abbey of Saint-Martin d'Autun in Aubigny.

== Administration ==
List of Successive Mayors

From	To	Name
1989	2001	Claude Rigollet
2001	2026	Gérard Roy

== Demography ==
The inhabitants of the commune are known as Aubignotins or Aubignotines in French.

Historical population

Year	Pop.	±% p.a.
1793	240	—
1821	336	+1.21%
1846	454	+1.21%
1872	455	+0.01%
1901	374	−0.67%
1926	272	−1.27%
1946	183	−1.96%
1962	164	−0.68%
1968	148	−1.70%

Year	Pop.	±% p.a.
1975	107	−4.53%
1982	107	+0.00%
1990	130	+2.46%
1999	138	+0.67%
2007	164	+2.18%
2012	165	+0.12%
2017	167	+0.24%
2023	172	+0.49%

Source: EHESS and INSEE

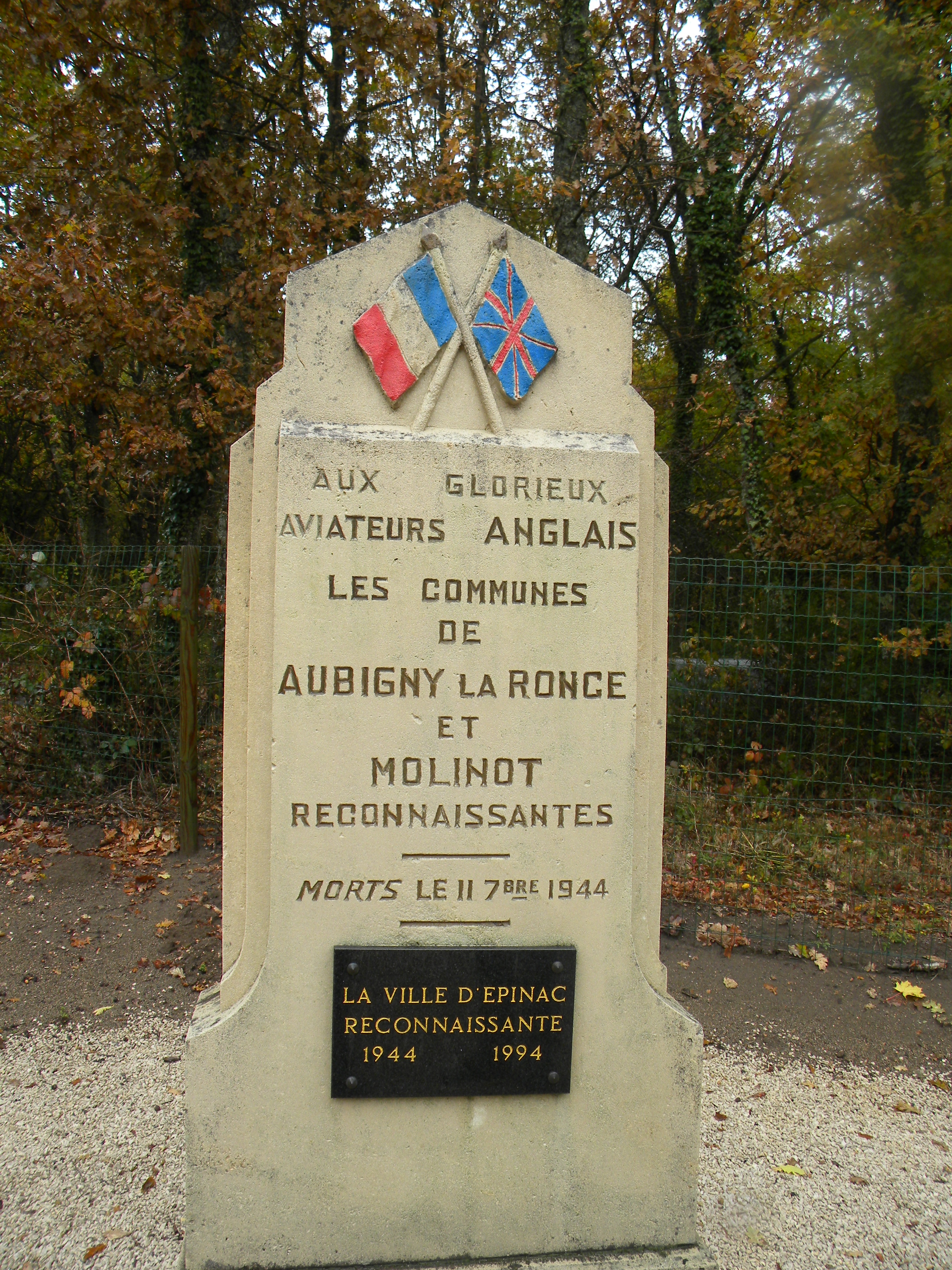
The War Memorial

== Culture and heritage ==
=== Civil heritage ===
The commune has many buildings and structures that are registered as historical monuments:

- A House at Rue de la Taupe (19th century)
- A Manor House at Grande Rue (17th century)
- A Lavoir (Public laundry) east of the village (1887)
- A Lavoir (Public laundry) at Lavau (19th century)
- Remains of a Chateau at La Chassagne (17th century)
- A Lavoir (Public laundry) at La Chassagne (19th century)
- Houses and Farms (18th-19th centuries)
- A coal Mine (19th century)

=== Religious heritage ===
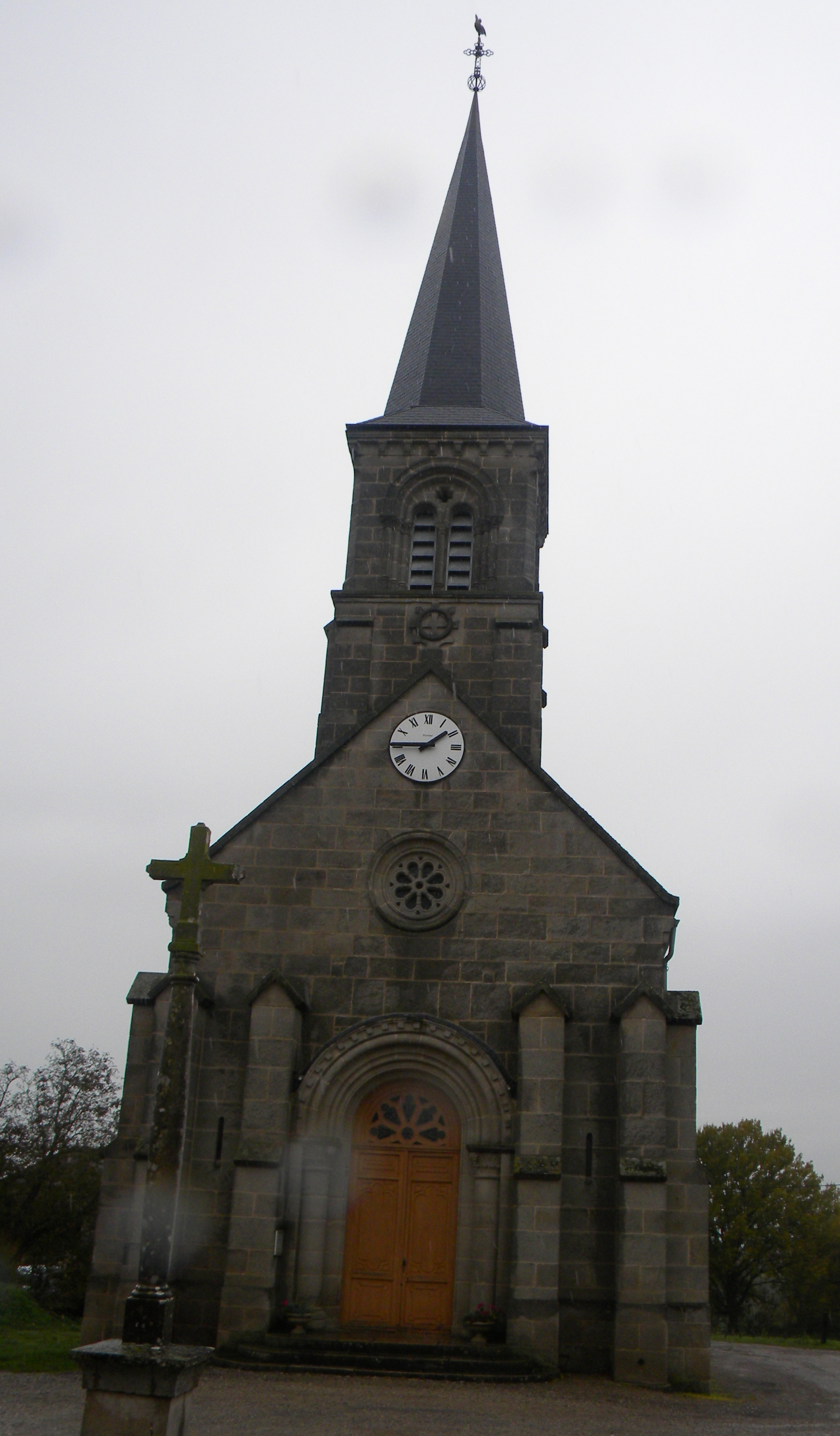
The Church of Saint John the Baptist

The commune has several religious buildings and structures that are registered as historical monuments:

- A Presbytery (18th century)
- The Chapel of Saint Bartholomew (1721)
- A Wayside Cross at the crossroads east of the village (1899)
- A Wayside Cross at the crossroads west of the village (19th century)
- A Monumental Cross (1869)
- 4 Monumental Crosses (19th century)
- A Cemetery Cross (1869)
- The Old Parish Church of Saint John the Baptist (12th century - demolished 1859)
- The Parish Church of Saint John the Baptist (19th century).

The Parish Church of Saint John the Baptist contains many items that are registered as historical objects:

- An Eagle-Lectern (16th century)
- A Statue: Saint Sebastian (17th century)
- A Headstone (Gallo-Roman)
- An Altar, Tabernacle, and Retable (18th century)
- 6 Altar Candlesticks (19th century)
- An Altar Cross (19th century)
- A Monstrance (1798)
- A Ciborium (1819)
- A Chalice with Paten (1838)
- A Chalice (1819)
- A Painting: Baptism of Christ (19th century)
- A Painting: The Crucifixion (19th century)
- A Statue: Saint Michel (17th century)
- 2 Statues: Virgin and Child (18th century)
- 2 Statues: Angels (19th century)
- 2 Statues: Virgin of the Immaculate conception and Saint Joseph (19th century)
- A Statuette: Virgin and Child (19th century)
- A Cross: Christ on the Cross (19th century)
- A Statuette: Saint Bishop (18th century)
- A Statuette: Saint Sebastian (17th century)
- A Front Pew (1777)
- A Lectern (17th century)
- A Baptismal font (19th century)
- A Pulpit (18th century)
- 2 Altars, Tabernacles, and Retables (19th century)
- An Altar and Tabernacle (1857)

== See also ==
- Communes of the Côte-d'Or department
