= Aubigny-la-Ronce coal mines =

Coal mines located in Aubigny-la-Ronce

Location of the deposit on the map of French coal basins.

46°59′15.13″N 4°36′32.49″E

The Aubigny-la-Ronce coal mines are in the commune of Aubigny-la-Ronce in the Côte-d'Or region of eastern France. The deposit was discovered in 1859 and mined first between 1877 and 1899, then again between the mid-1940s and 1952. Remnants of this activity (mine entrances, ruins, slag heaps, and rusty equipment) remain to this day.

== Location ==
Location of the coal basin in the Côte-d'Or department.

The deposit is located in the commune of Aubigny-la-Ronce, in the Côte-d'Or department of the Bourgogne-Franche-Comté region. It lies a few kilometers northeast of the Épinac coal mine.

== Geology ==
The coal mined is a lean, "flaming" coal, containing a lot of ash. The deposit, which consists of two layers, dates from the Stephanian period and is similar to that of Épinac.

== History ==
Map of coal concessions in Burgundy: 1. Sincey-lès-Rouvray; 2. Polroy; 3. Chambois; 4. Concessions in the Épinac basin; 5. Aubigny-la-Ronce; 6. Decize; 7. Verneuil; 8. Le Creusot (Blanzy basin); 9. Other concessions in the Blanzy basin including Montchanin and Longpendu; 10. La Dheune; 11. Vellerot; 12. Forges; 13. Les Petits Châteaux; 14. Pully; 15. Grandchamp; 16. St-Laurent en Brionnais; 17. Les Moquets; 18. La Chapelle-sous-Dun; 19. Montreuillon, Montigny en Morvan and Blismes; 20. Menessaire; 21. Reclesmes; 22. Uxeau and Toulon-sur-Arroux.

=== Discovered ===
The deposit was discovered by Mr. Duchemin, who dug the Roncevaux shaft in 1859 to a depth of thirty meters. He also excavated two test pits: the first encountered coal at a depth of seven meters, while the second struck coal at five meters but was abandoned at eleven meters. The concession was eventually abandoned for lack of funds.

=== First mining operation ===
In 1873, with the help of Mr. Catoire, Mr. Duchemin began mining the Roncevaux shaft, which was deepened the following year. Between 1874 and 1875, four other shafts were dug, including the Chaton shaft. At the same time, ten boreholes were drilled in the vicinity of the Roncevaux shaft to investigate the extension of the deposit into the Farge valley, but all the results were negative. Two further test pits to the north of the village of Aubigny-la-Ronce gave the same result. Mining was mainly carried out at the Chaton shaft, and to a lesser extent at the Roncevaux shaft, as the other shafts produced virtually no coal. The mines closed in 1899.

=== Attempted revival ===
A prospective campaign was carried out by the Société de Recherche du Centre, which drilled several deep holes between 1912 and 1913. The east-northeast extension of the previously mined deposit was not found.

=== Second operation ===
The activity was revived in the 1940s by Épinac merchants who opened a downhill mine. A few pockets of coal were mined between the old drowned workings under artisanal and particularly dangerous conditions. The coal was transported to the village square by an old US Army GMC truck (probably a GMC CCKW) for sale to local craftsmen and coal merchants. The mine closed for good in 1952.

== Work ==
=== Roncesvalles (or Aubigny) shaft ===
The Roncesvalles shaft was sunk in 1859. At a depth of thirteen meters, it encountered a 1.20-meter-thick, steeply sloping layer of coal. A second hitch was created 29.50 meters from the surface and the sinking stopped. Two research galleries were dug. The southeast gallery intersects the first layer at a distance of nine meters. The northwest gallery encountered a two-meter-thick layer 55 meters from the shaft. The shaft was subsequently abandoned along with the concession.

The shaft was rehabilitated in 1873. The following year, it was deepened to 80 meters, with the creation of a third hang at 76.50 meters.

In 1892, the shaft, which had by then been filled in, was cleared over its entire height. The second layer was reached at a depth of 27 meters, and the third at 76 meters. It was equipped with a 25 hp steam engine for extraction and a new headframe in 1894. A 14-meter ventilation shaft was built 90 meters from the extraction shaft. The Roncesvalles shaft closed in 1899.

At the beginning of the 21st century, the ruins of the extraction machine building remain, as well as the site of the shaft forming a funnel several meters in diameter and a slag heap.

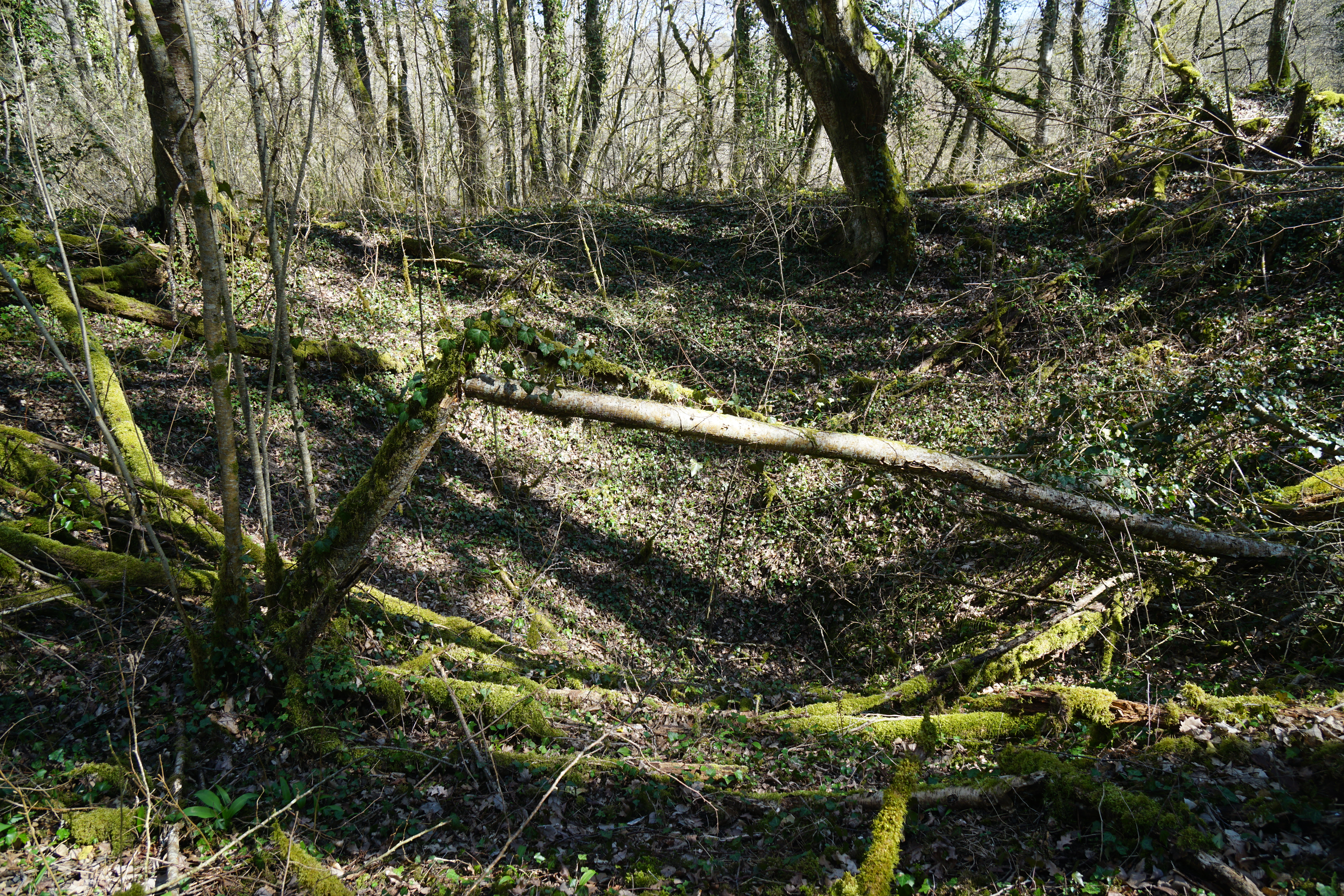
The location of the well.

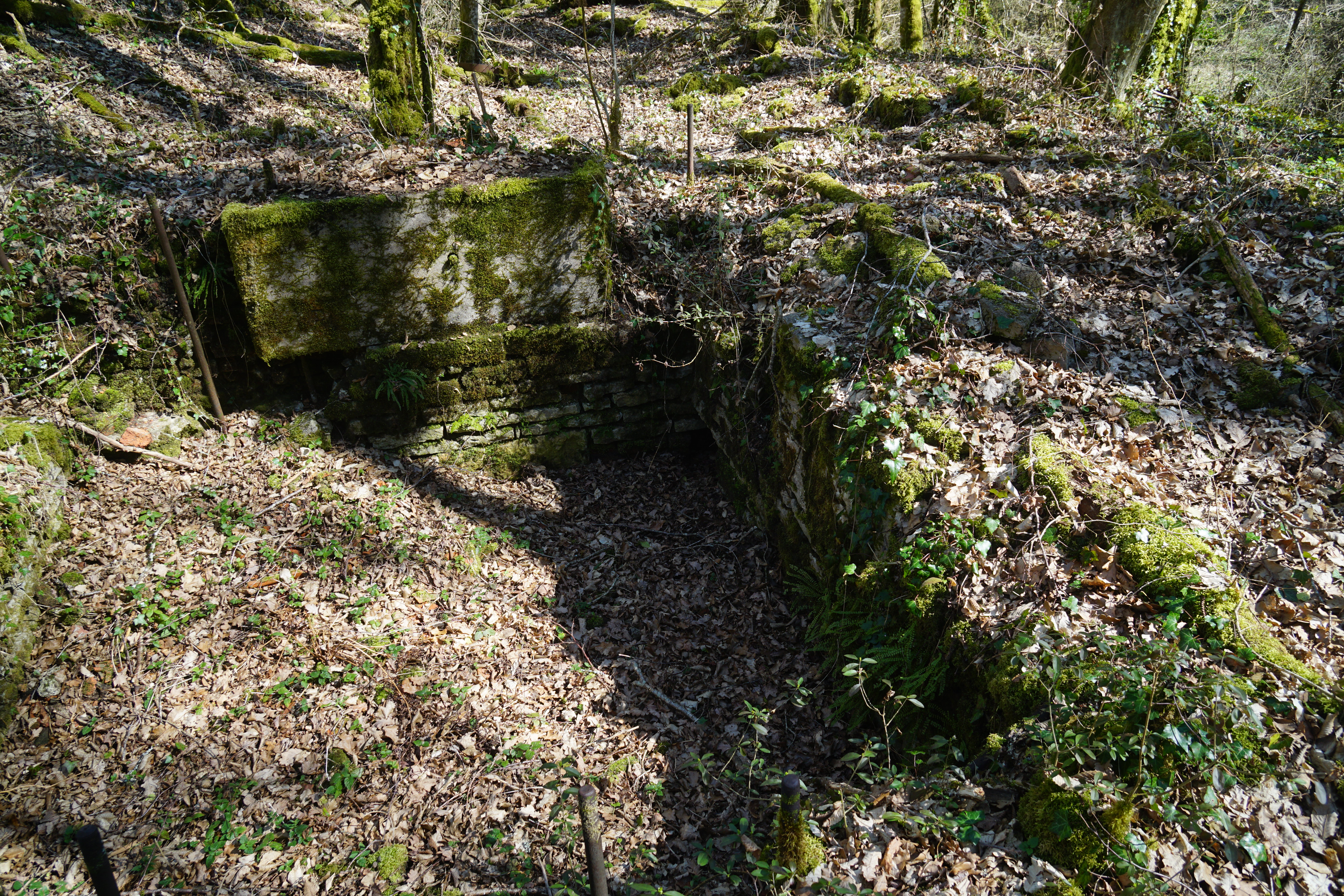
Ruins of the mining machine building.

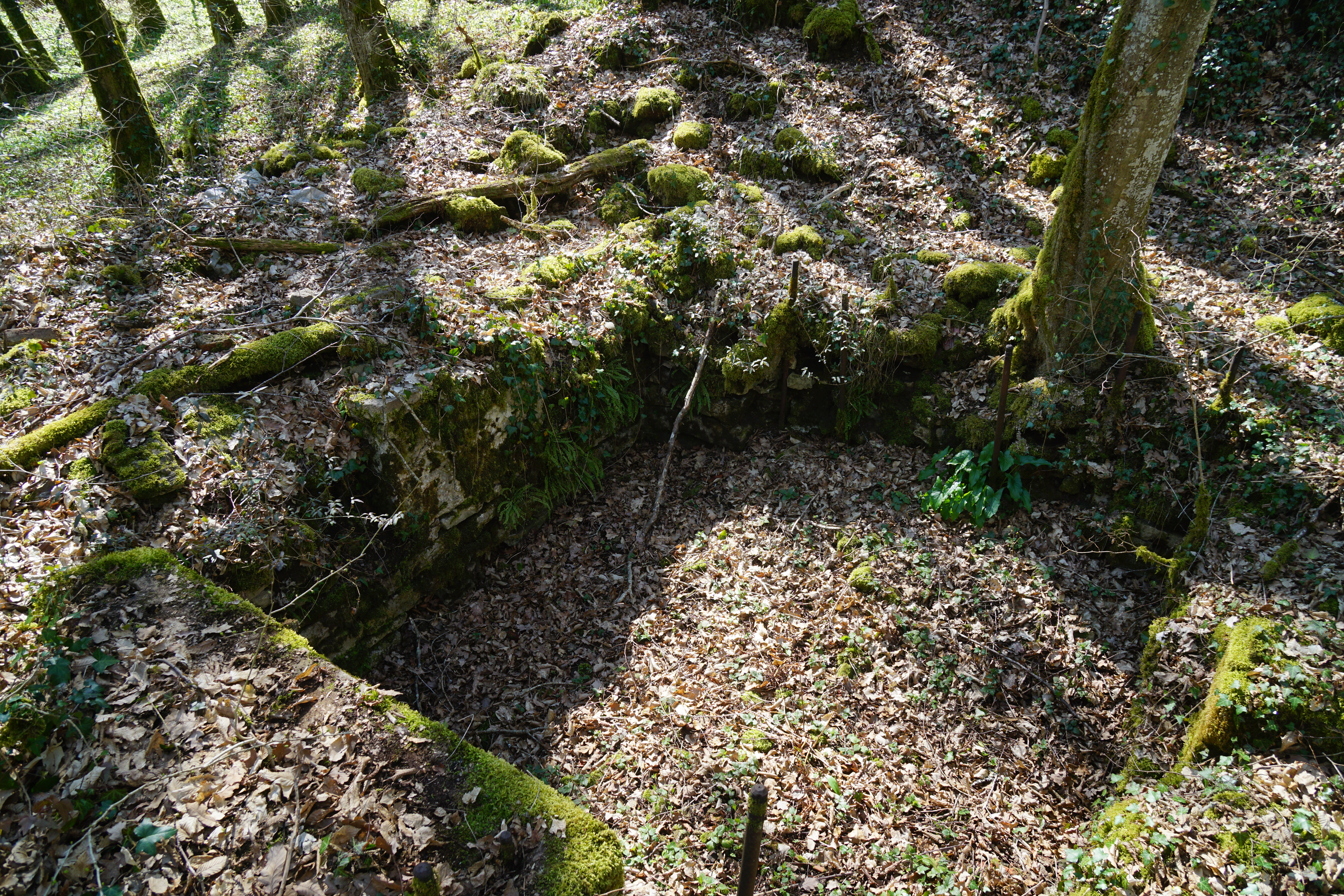
Ruins of the Roncevaux Well mining machine building.

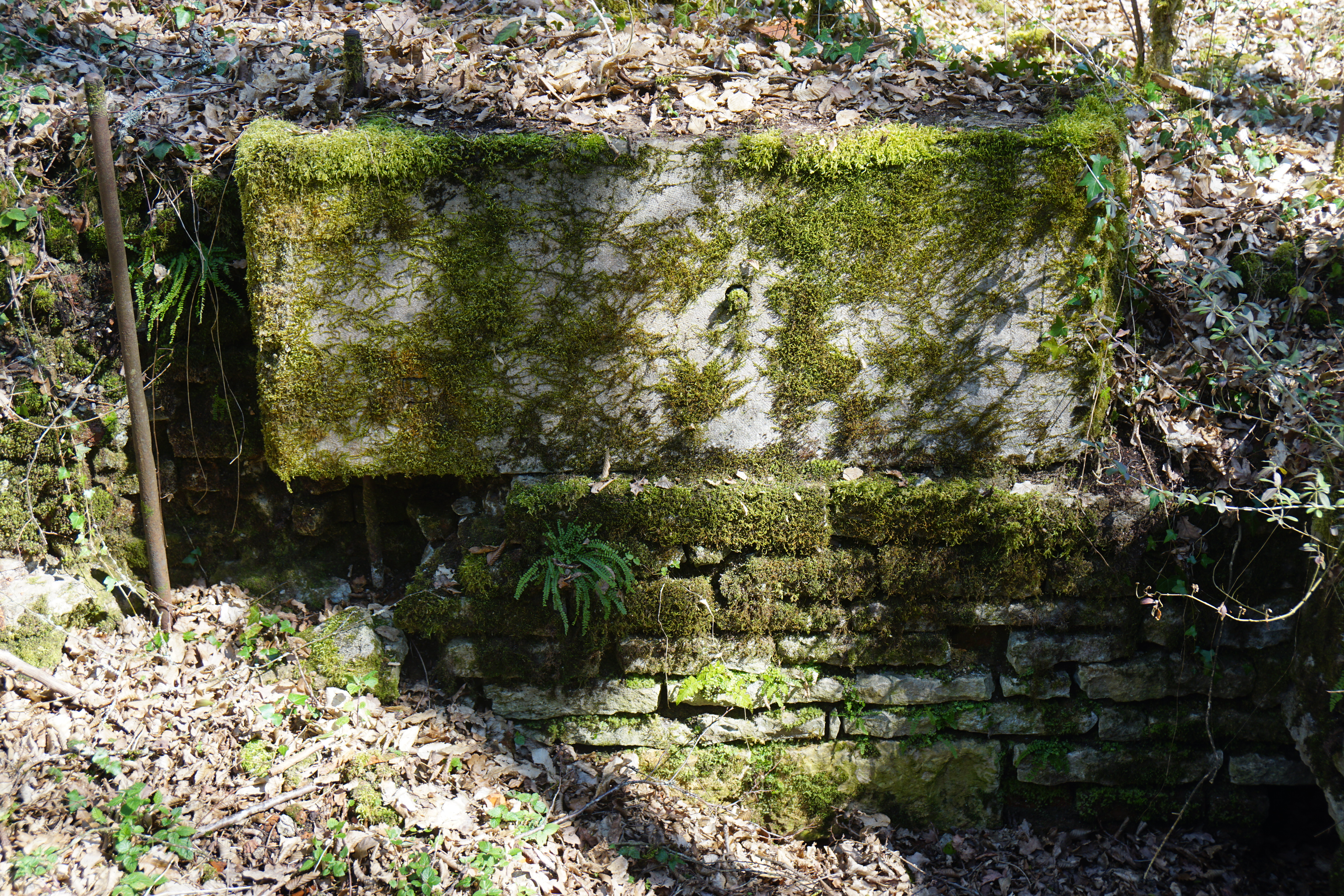
Solid stone for steam engine.

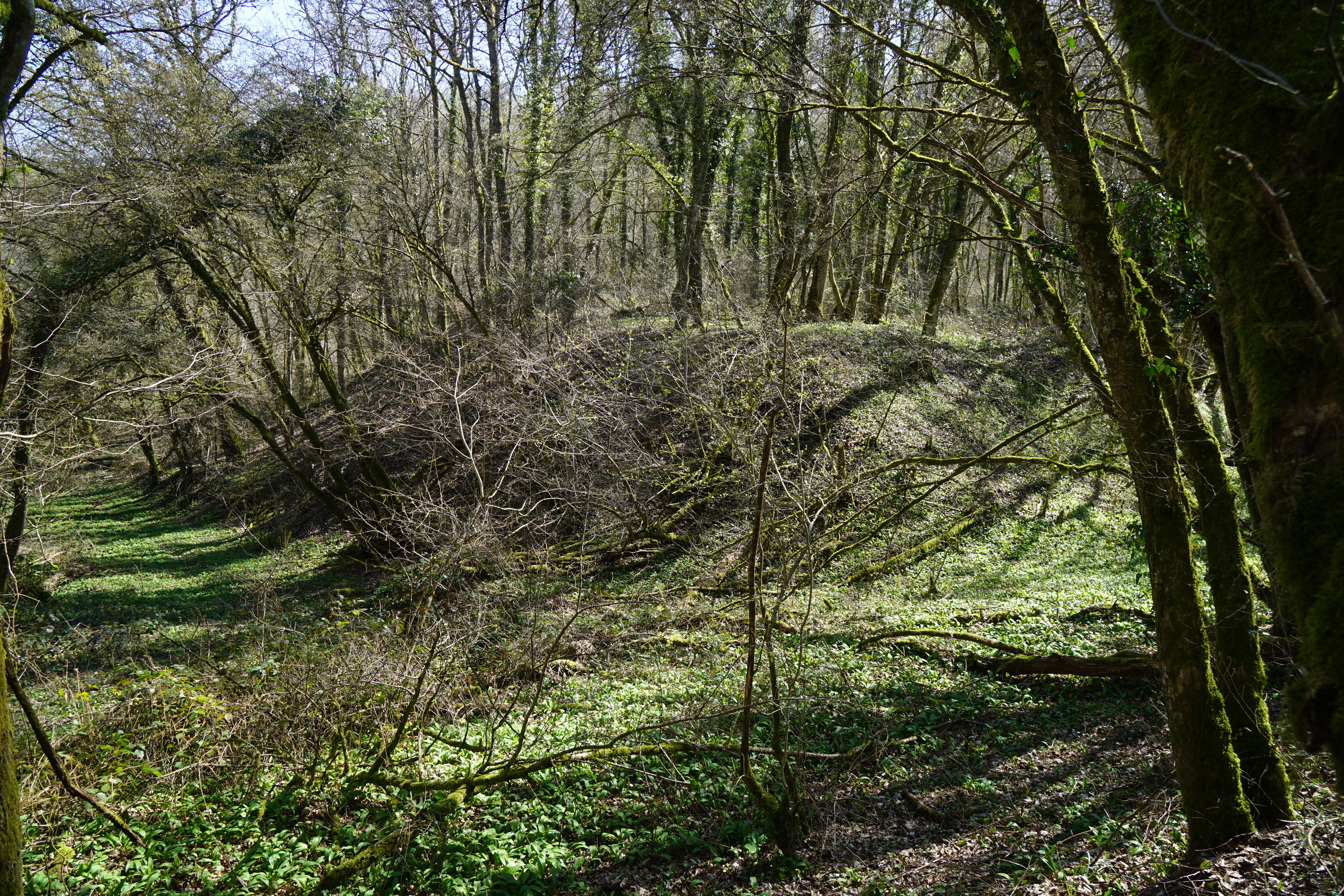
The slag heap.

=== Shaft D ===
This shaft was sunk on September 7, 1874, and at a depth of 16.30 meters encountered shale with coal veinlets. Two galleries were then dug and the shaft was stopped at a depth of 17.50 meters. It was soon abandoned.

=== Shaft F ===
Sinking began on September 7, 1874, and the shaft encountered coal-bearing sandstone after 2.50 meters, but no trace of coal, so it was abandoned.

=== Shaft G ===
Drilled in 1874, the shaft encountered black shale at a depth of 15.30 meters. Two exploration galleries were dug, but the shaft was flooded and abandoned.

=== Chaton shaft ===
The Chaton shaft was sunk in February 1875, encountering shale at a depth of forty meters, and a traverse was dug.

The shaft was deepened to 87 meters and became the most productive shaft in the coalfield. Most logging operations take place within a 350-meter radius of the shaft, but some sites are as far away as 850 meters. The maximum depth is 115 meters. After abandonment, the shaft left behind several large spoil heaps.

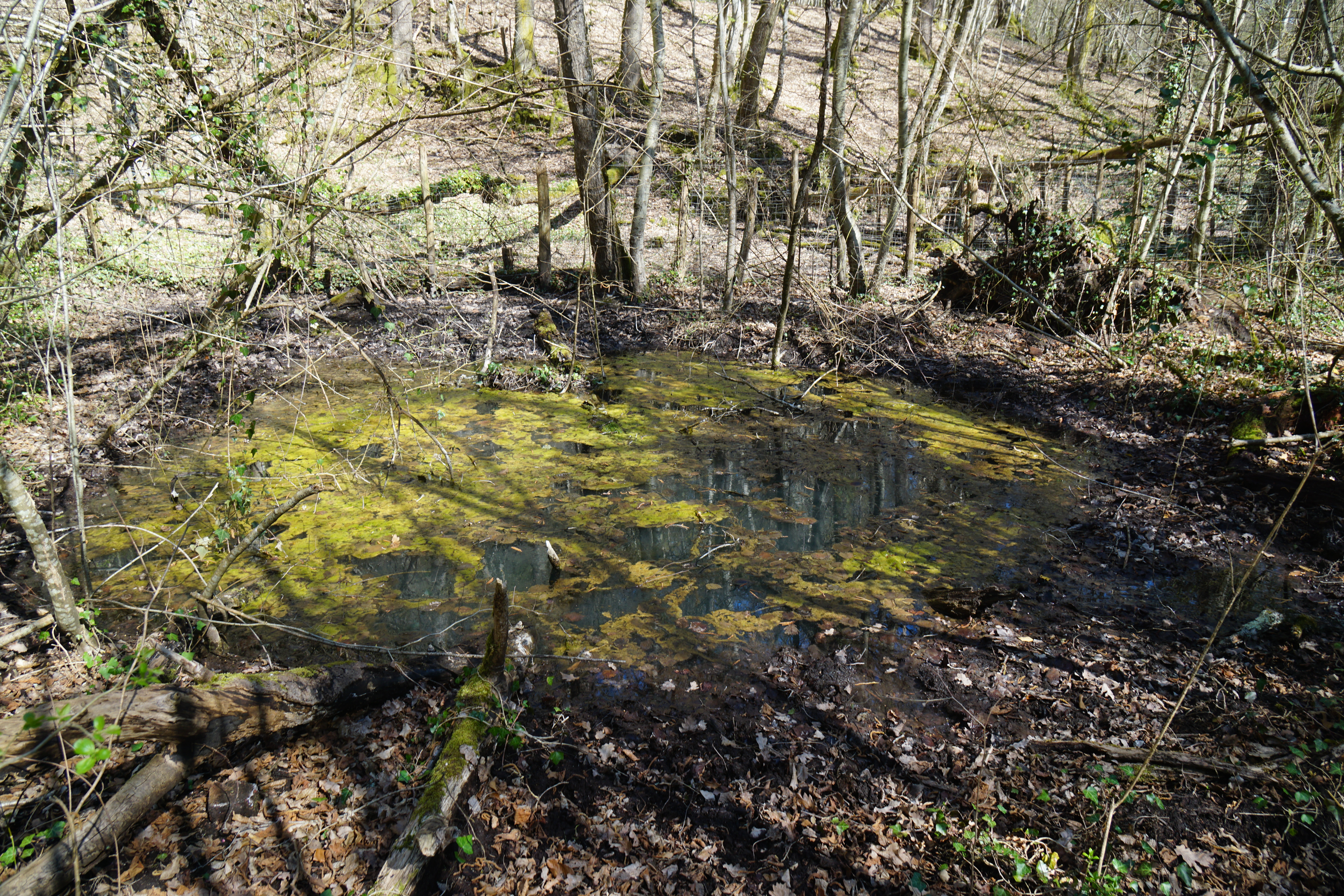
The Kitten Well.

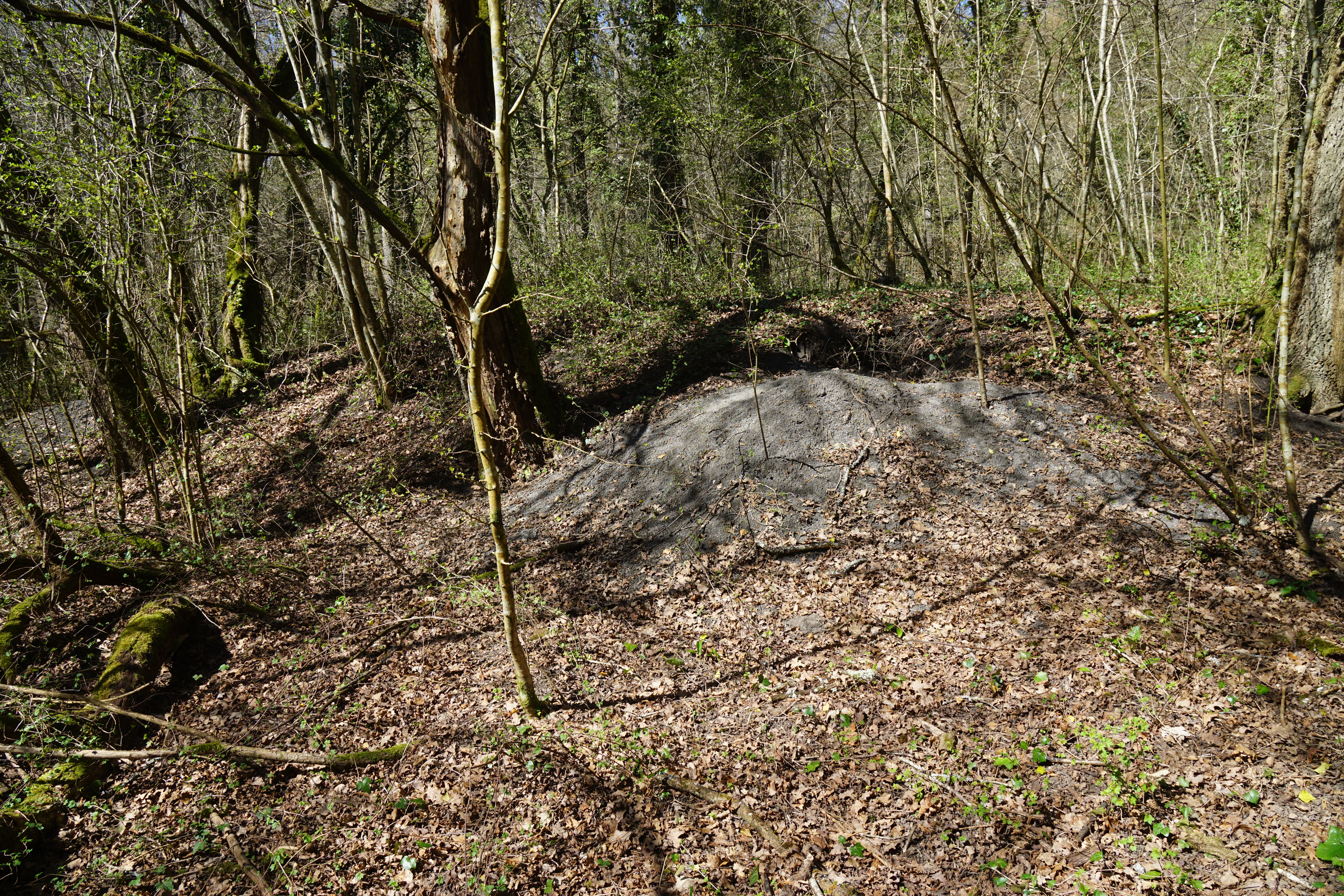
The slag heap.

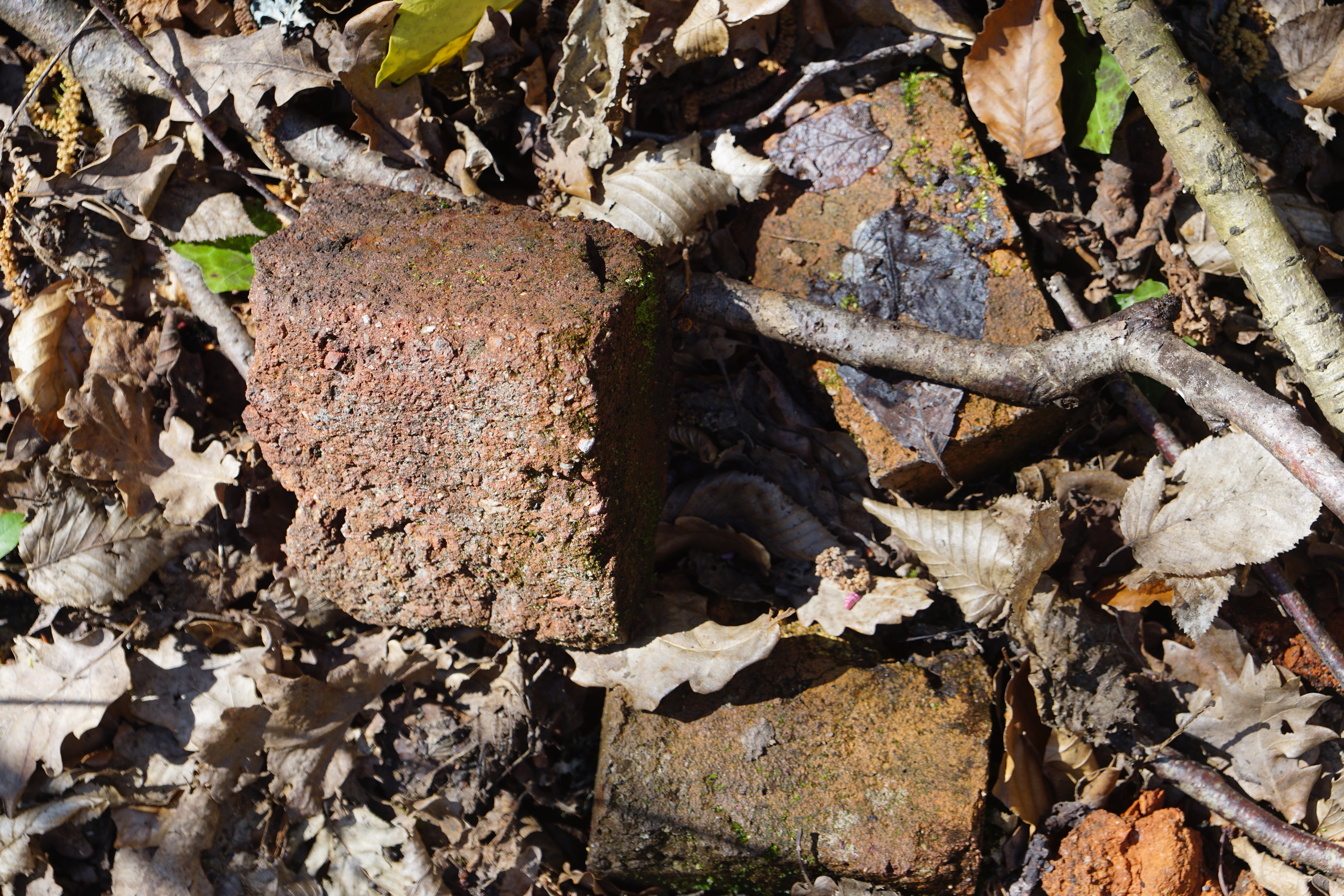
Pieces of bricks from old buildings.

=== Descent ===
In the 1940s, a 35-metre-long descent was dug in the vicinity of the Roncesvalles shaft to restart operations. The minecarts are hauled up using a manual winch. According to a former miner, it took three-quarters of an hour to pull up a full sedan. Workers regularly come across old drowned workings, which are cleared by electric pumps.

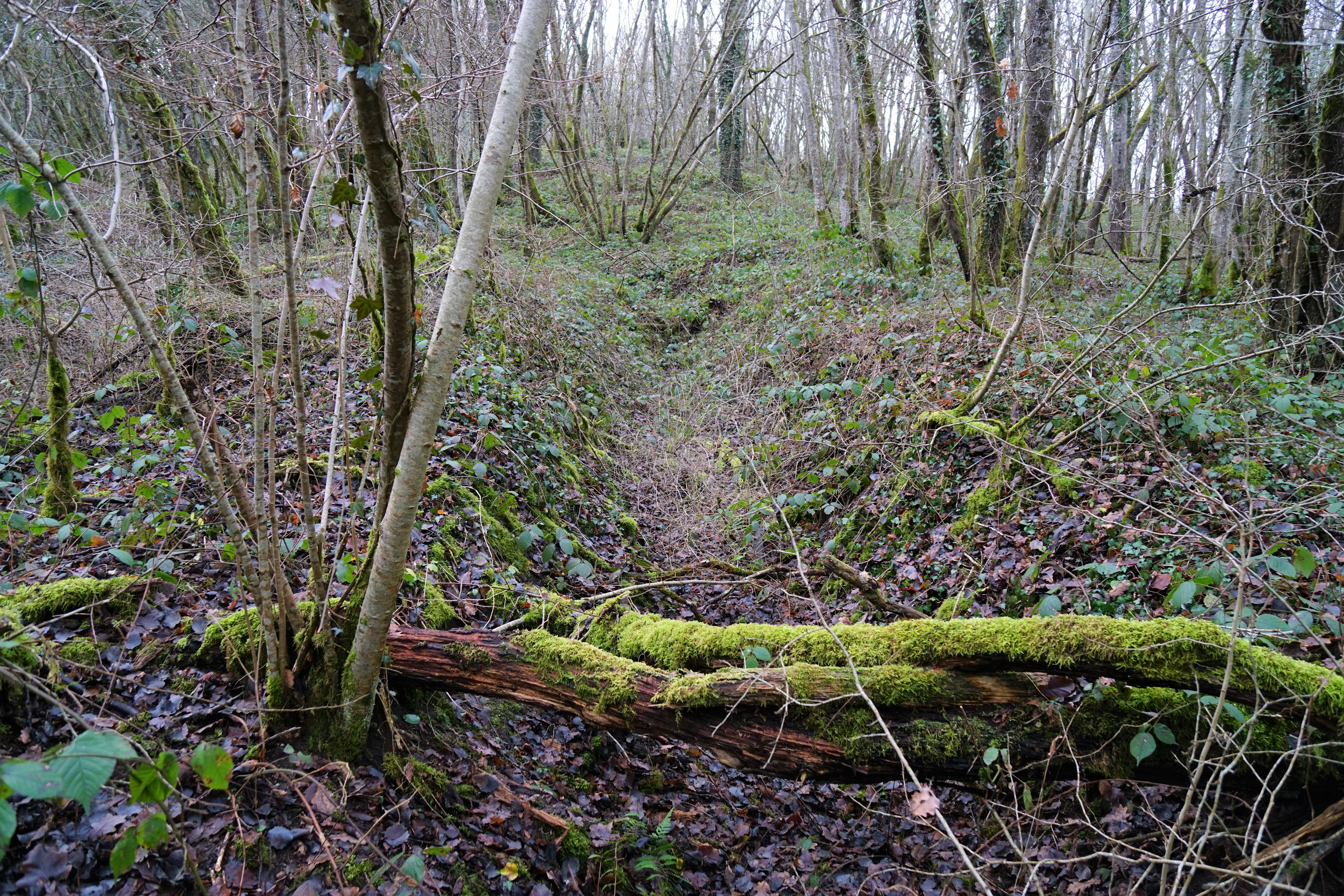
The entrance is filled in.

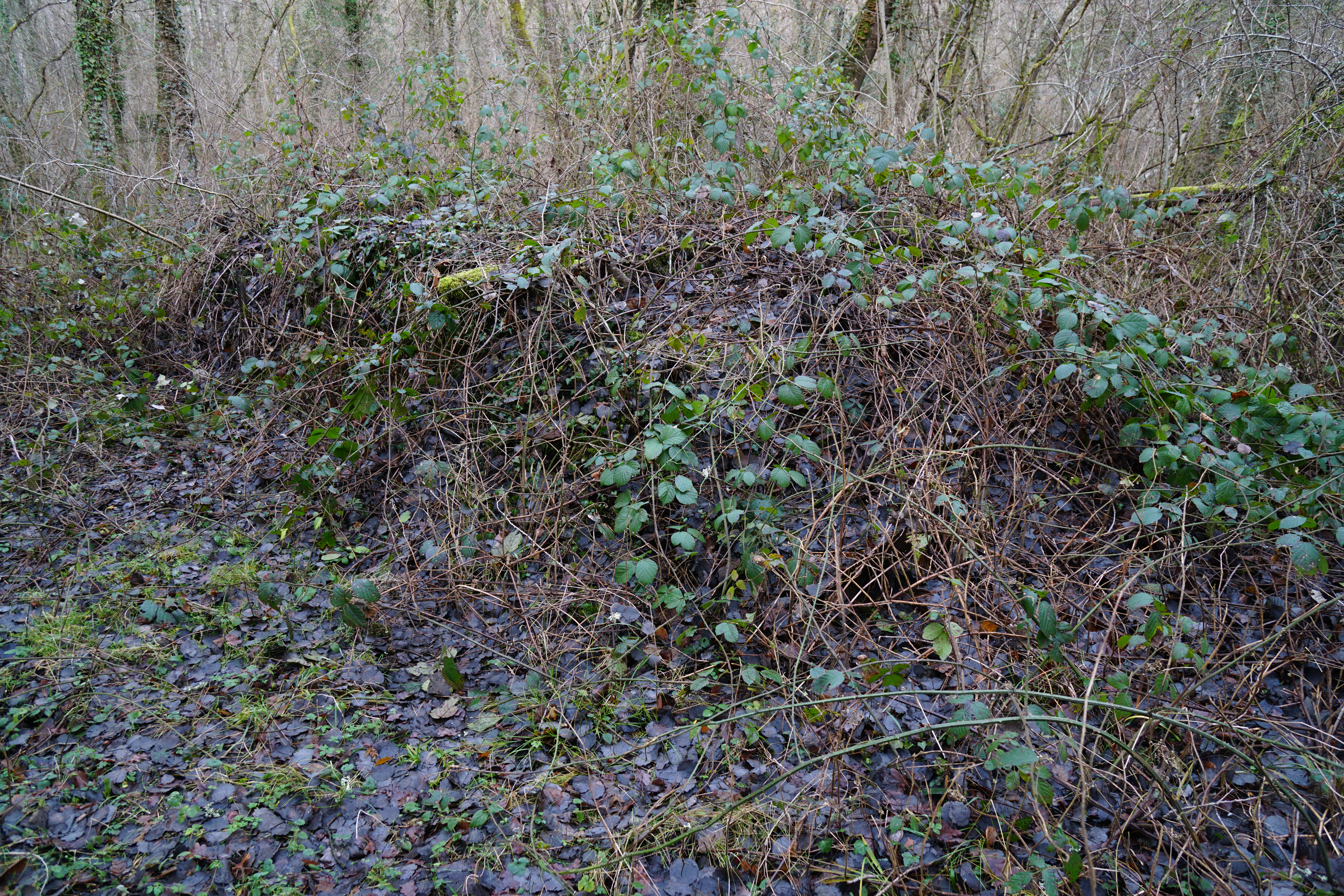
Masonry ruins of the winch.

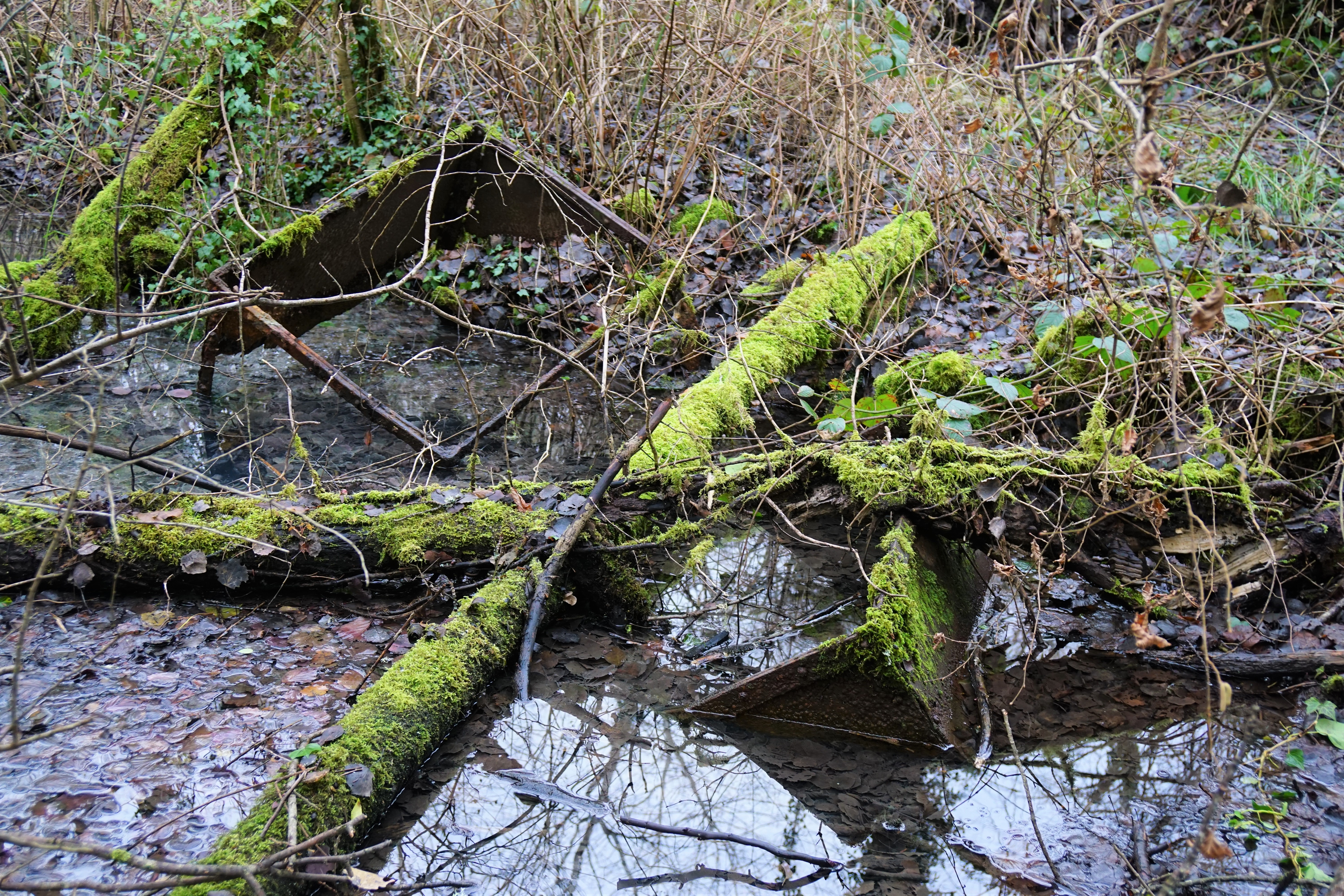
Abandoned sedans.

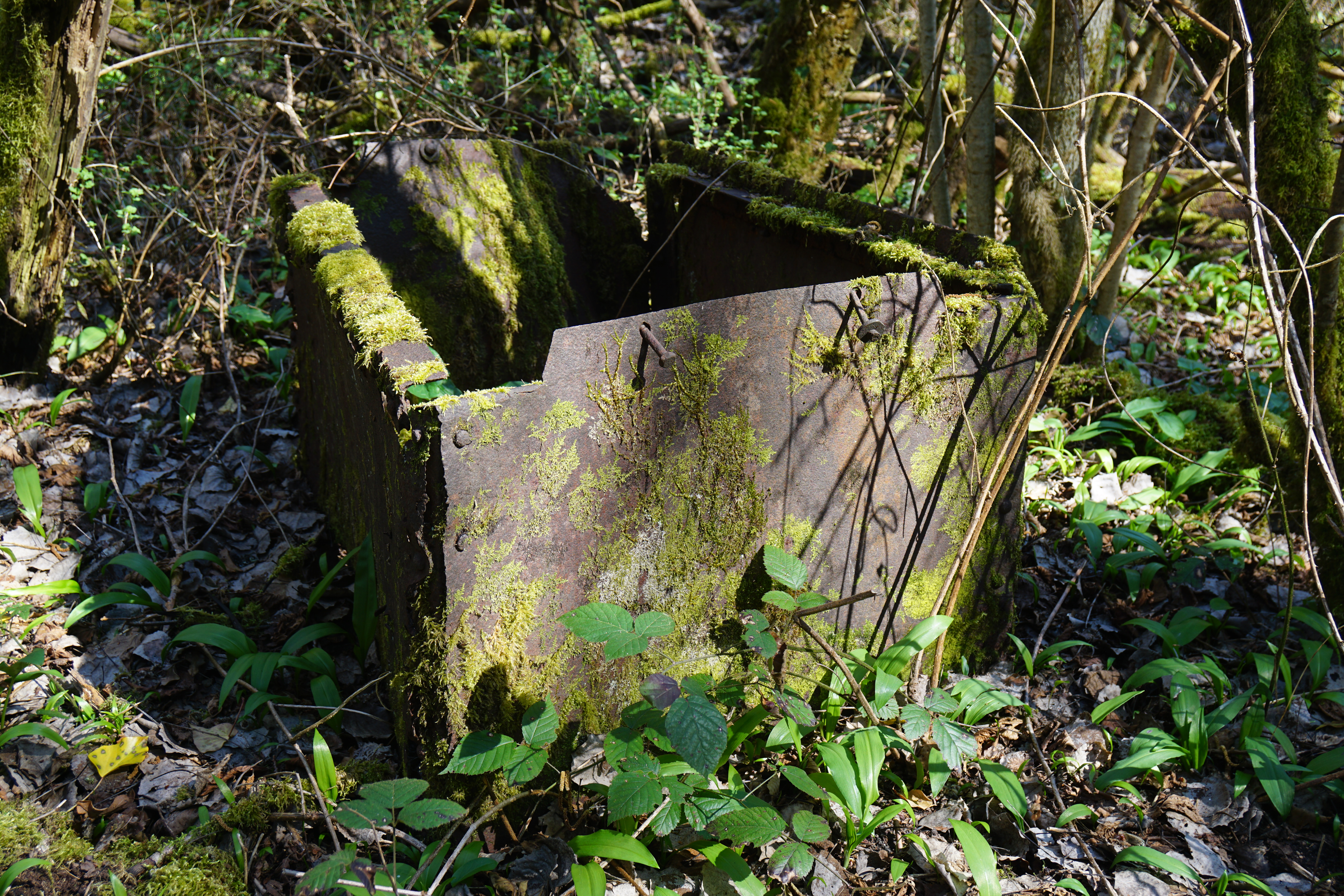
Old saloon from the Roncevaux descent.

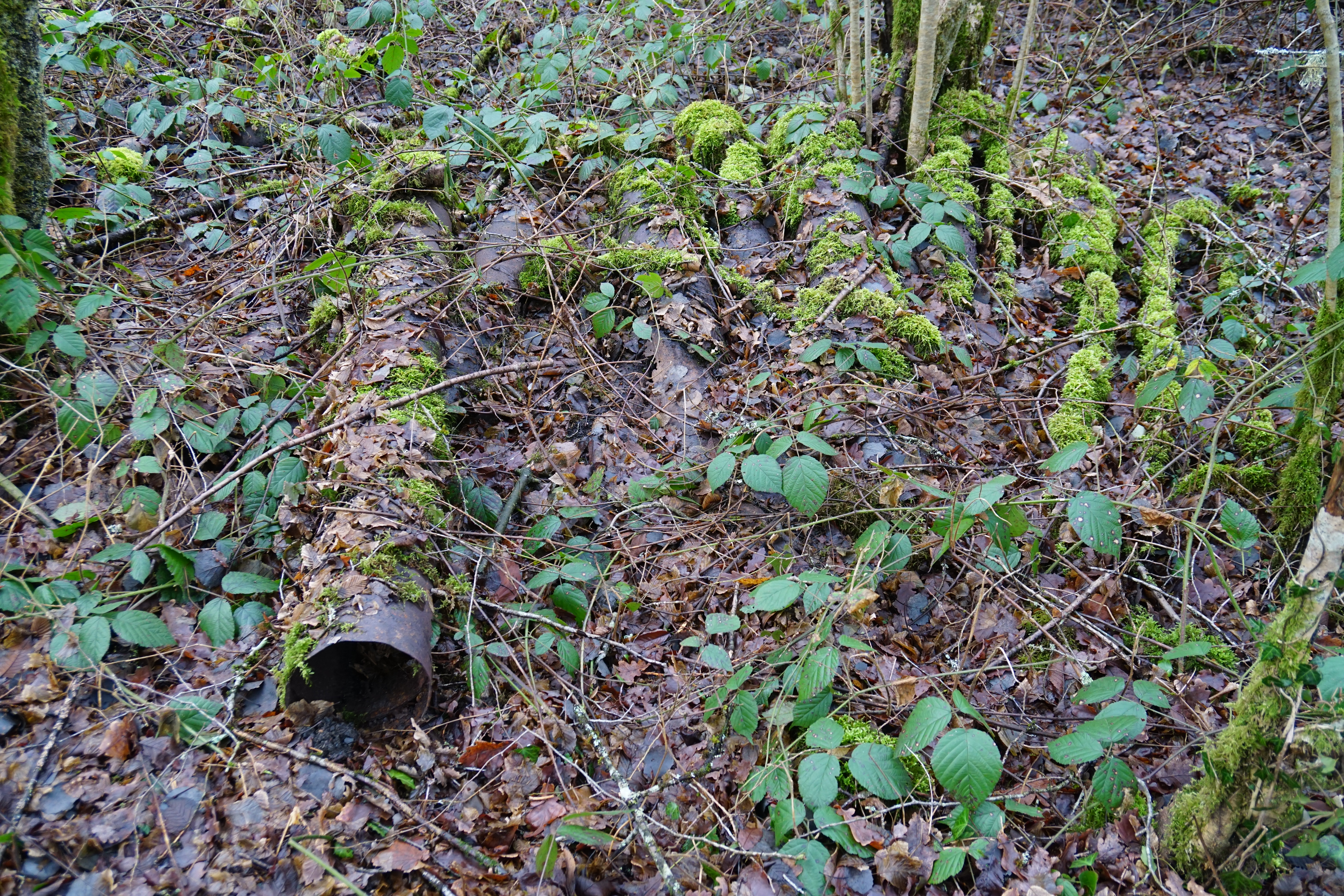
Piping.

== Production ==
Evolution of Coal Mining
	1879	1890	1895
Approximate production in tons	950	6,300	4,000

Between 1877 and 1899, annual production fluctuated between 1,000 and 15,000 tons.

== Bibliography ==
- Passaqui, Jean-Philippe; Chabard, Dominique (2007). Les routes de l'energie : Epinac, Autun, Morvan : patrimoine industriel, scientifique et technique [Energy routes: Epinac, Autun, Morvan: industrial, scientific and technical heritage] (in French). Ville d'Autun. p. 152.
- Feys, R. (1946). Rapport sur la concession de houille d'Aubigny-la-Ronce (Côte-d'Or) [Report on the Aubigny-la-Ronce coal concession (Côte-d'Or)] (PDF) (in French). BRGM.
