= Hottinguer coal mine =

One of the main mines in Épinac, France

- Puits Hottinguer
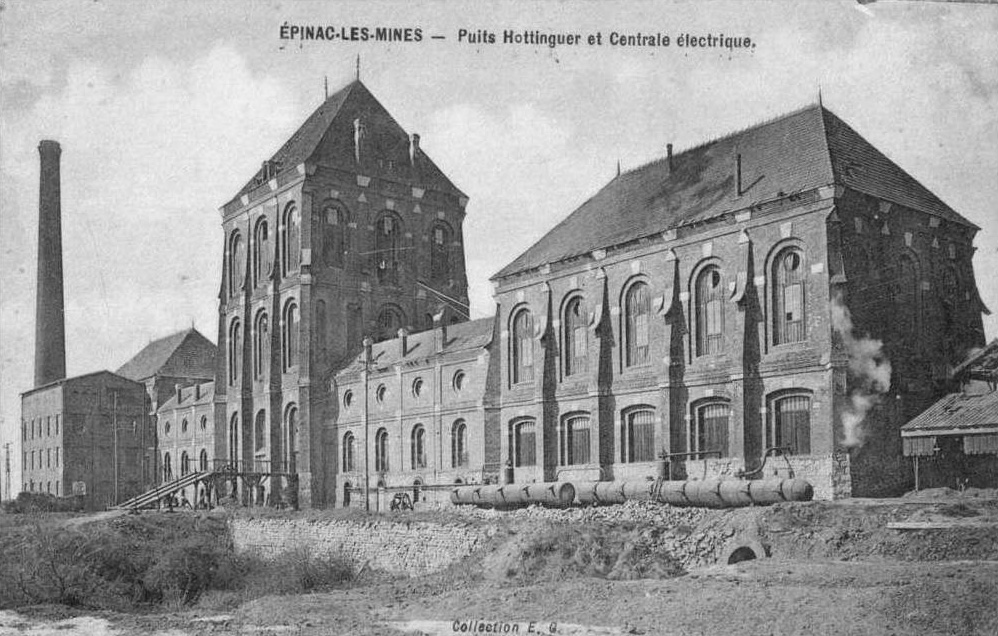

- Location within Bourgogne-Franche-Comté

General information
- Location: Épinac, Saône-et-Loire, Bourgogne-Franche-Comté, France
- Coordinates: 46°59′01″N 4°31′15″E
- Construction started: 1863
- Completed: 1871
- Demolished: 1936 (filled)
- Owner: Houillères d'Épinac

Height
- Height: 623.2 m (2,045 ft)

Technical details
- Material: Coal
- Floor count: 618 meters (operational levels)

The Hottinguer coal mine was one of the main collieries of the Épinac coal mine. The buildings, raised between 1872 and 1876, housed a revolutionary atmospheric extraction system: a piston moving in a 558 m-high tube, machined in Le Creusot (an original technique by engineer Zulma Blanchet), rather than by traditional cables, which at the time were unable to descend to such depths (over 600 m), making it the deepest mine shaft in France when it was commissioned in 1871.

After its closure in 1936, it was converted into a paint factory in 1948 by the BITULAC company, before being abandoned in 1998, barely ten years after the fire of March 12, 1989. It was listed as a historic monument by decree on November 26, 1992, and was classified by decree on October 11, 2022, which superseded the original listing. The Malakoff Tower and its wings have been undergoing renovation since late 2012. The construction of a photovoltaic power plant near the old buildings is currently under study.

== Sinking ==
The Hottinguer mine was sunk not far from the Garenne mine, as engineers believed it would provide an extension of the coal beds, with an estimated reserve of 400 million hectoliters. The sinking of the shaft began on May 26, 1863.

By 1868, the shaft had reached a depth of 447 meters, and the engineers realized that the inclination of the geological strata had changed. While the engineers thought they'd find coal at a depth of 530 meters, they still didn't reach it at 600 meters. Finally, on November 17, 1871, at a depth of 618 meters and 110 meters from the bottom, the coal (a 4-metre thick layer) was reached after digging a traverse bank, making it the deepest mine shaft in France.

== Mining ==
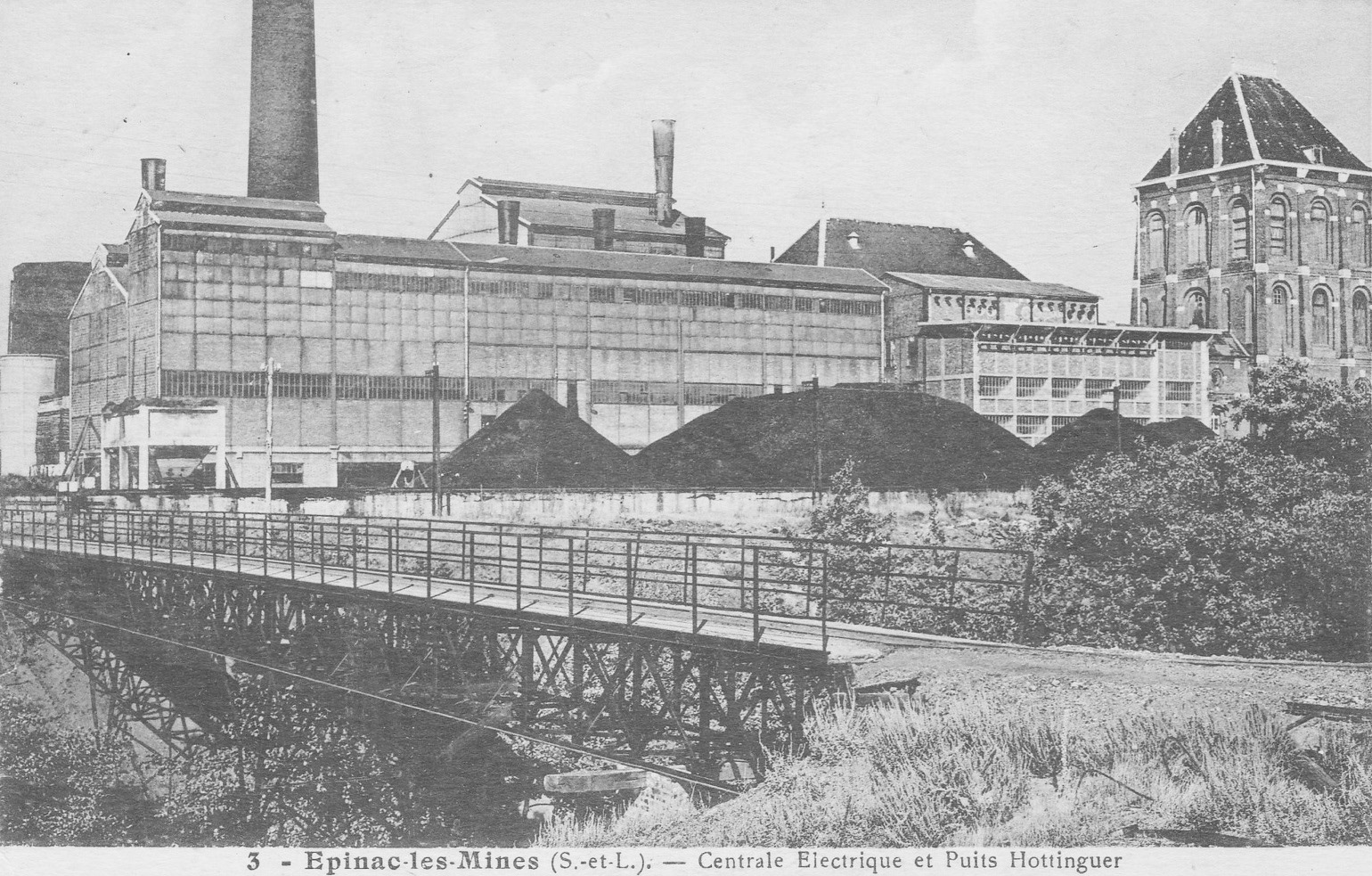
The Hottinguer mine thermal power station.

Before 1884, production from the Hottinguer mine remained low for several reasons: the pneumatic system was difficult to set up, the 40 hp steam engine was insufficient and the strata encountered were of poor quality. Around 1884–1885, production increased thanks to discoveries on level 618 and the now reliable pneumatic system.

In 1887, following the death of Mr. Blanchet, tube mining was stopped and cable mining was concentrated on floor 618. In 1910, the power station at the Hottinguer mine sold electricity as far away as Autun and Meursault. The Hottinguer mine ceased mining for good in 1936, thirty years before the complete closure of the Épinac basin.

== Surface installations ==
The size and originality of the Hottinguer mine building make it unique in France. This type of architecture, known as the Malakoff tower, was quite common in Germany. The headframe and the extraction machine were grouped in the same building. The Épinac coal mines' atypical choice was inspired by Belgian and German systems, but also by the constraints associated with the specificity of the atmospheric process, which required the housing of very cumbersome aerial installations, hence the height of the tower.

=== Pneumatic tube extraction ===
In 1871, conventional cable extraction techniques were unable to equip a shaft as deep as the Hottinguer mine, so a pneumatic system was devised by Zulma Blanchet.

This system uses a tube running the length of the shaft, with a piston inside. A pneumatic machine is placed on the mine's floor to suck in the air contained in the tube. During ascent, the pneumatic machine draws in the air above the piston, causing it to rise in the tube. On the descent, the air is reintroduced into the tube via valves that regulate the fall of the piston and cage.

=== Application to the Hottinguer mine ===
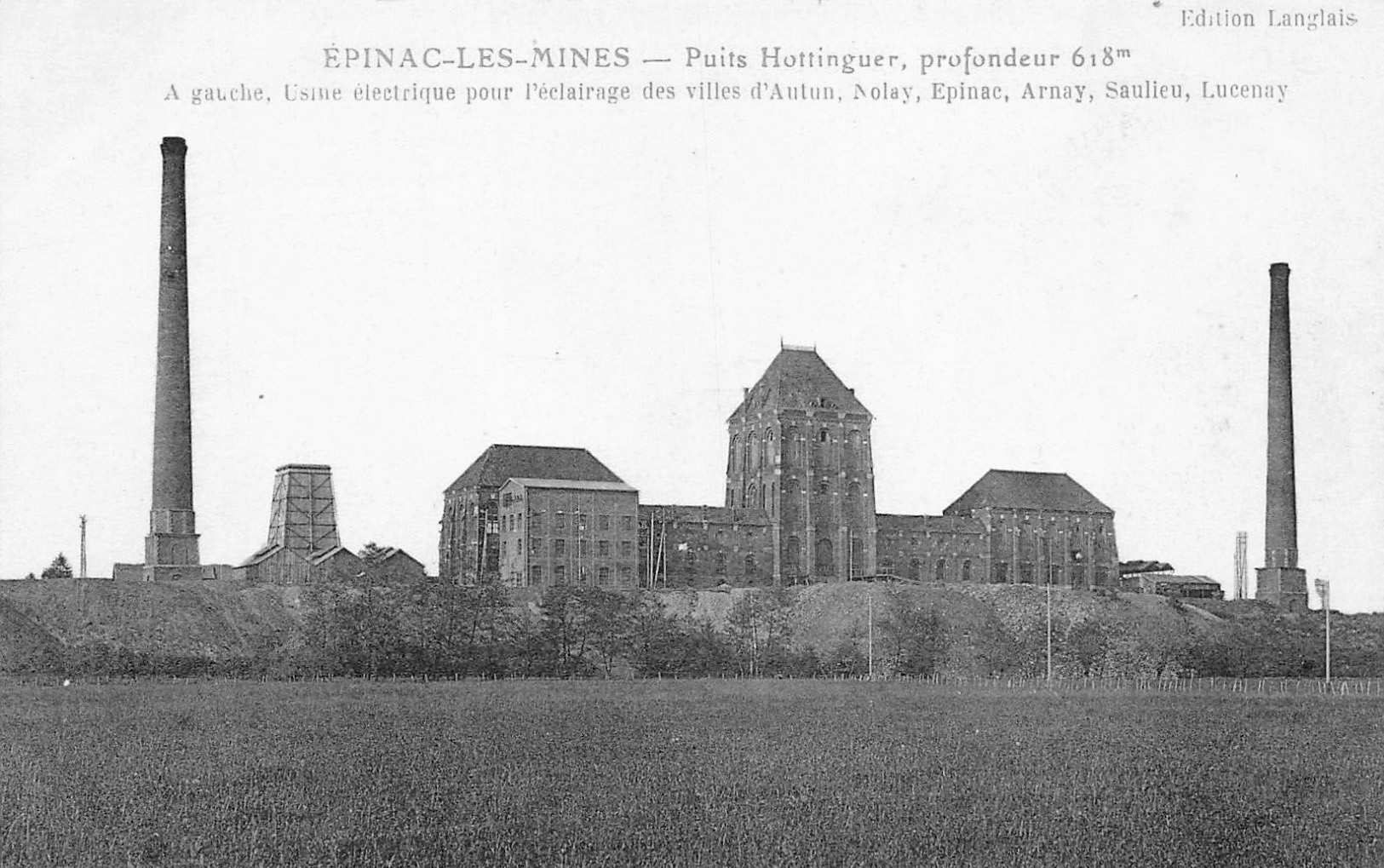
General view of the Hottinguer coal mine in operation.

On June 10, 1873, a ministerial decision authorized the use of the pneumatic process at the Hottinguer coal mine. The tube was manufactured at Le Creusot and installed in the mid-1870s. The first test took place on July 23, 1876, with the piston ascending in twenty minutes to a height of 558 meters. Extraction through the tube began at the end of August 1876.

=== Features ===
Here are the technical characteristics of the finished installation:

- Tube: made up of 485 8-millimeter-thick sheet metal shells, with a cumulative weight of 342,025 kg and a diameter of 1.6 meters;
- Pistons: made of wood, sealed with leather;
- Cage: made of steel and has three levels;
- Shaft: with an effective diameter of 4.25 meters, it comprises four compartments: the tube compartment, the ladder compartment, the cable extraction compartment, and the ventilation compartment;
- Machine: manufactured in Saint-Étienne by Révollier and Bétrix, it was delivered in 1880 and commissioned two years later. Rated at 1,500 bhp, it comprises two steam engines coupled to two cylinders with a stroke and diameter of 1.2 meters. With this machine, the ascent took three minutes and the descent six minutes.

== Reconversion ==
=== After the mine ===
Heritage interest in this tower is not new. At the end of the 19th century, this mine, considered unique in France, was already welcoming many visitors. In 1893, members of the Société de l'industrie minérale de France held their annual congress in Burgundy, and the only visit to a historic site was to the Hottinguer coal mine.

The mine and its buildings, interesting enough, were also the subject of memoirs written by students at the École nationale supérieure des mines de Paris. Awareness of the heritage value of the Hottinguer mine outside the Épinac basin dates back to the 1980s. A seminal work on industrial archaeology in France, published by Robert Laffont, contains important developments on the unique character of this building. CILAC, France's leading association for the conservation and promotion of industrial heritage, published an article on the mine in its early reviews. In 2004, CILAC members visited the Hottinguer mine during a symposium in Le Creusot to celebrate the association's 25th anniversary.

The book "Les Routes de l'énergie, Épinac, Autun, Morvan", written by Jean-Philippe Passaqui, professor at the Lycée Militaire and Doctor of History, and Dominique Chabard, curator at the Muséum d'Histoire Naturelle d'Autun, focuses on coal mining in Épinac, and in particular the Hottinguer mine.

Following the closure of the mines, many of the associated installations were dismantled or destroyed. However, the buildings of the Hottinguer shaft were preserved after being acquired by a painting company. As a result, they remain an important example of industrial heritage and are preserved in relatively good condition, according to specialists in industrial site conservation. It was listed as a historic monument on November 26, 1992.

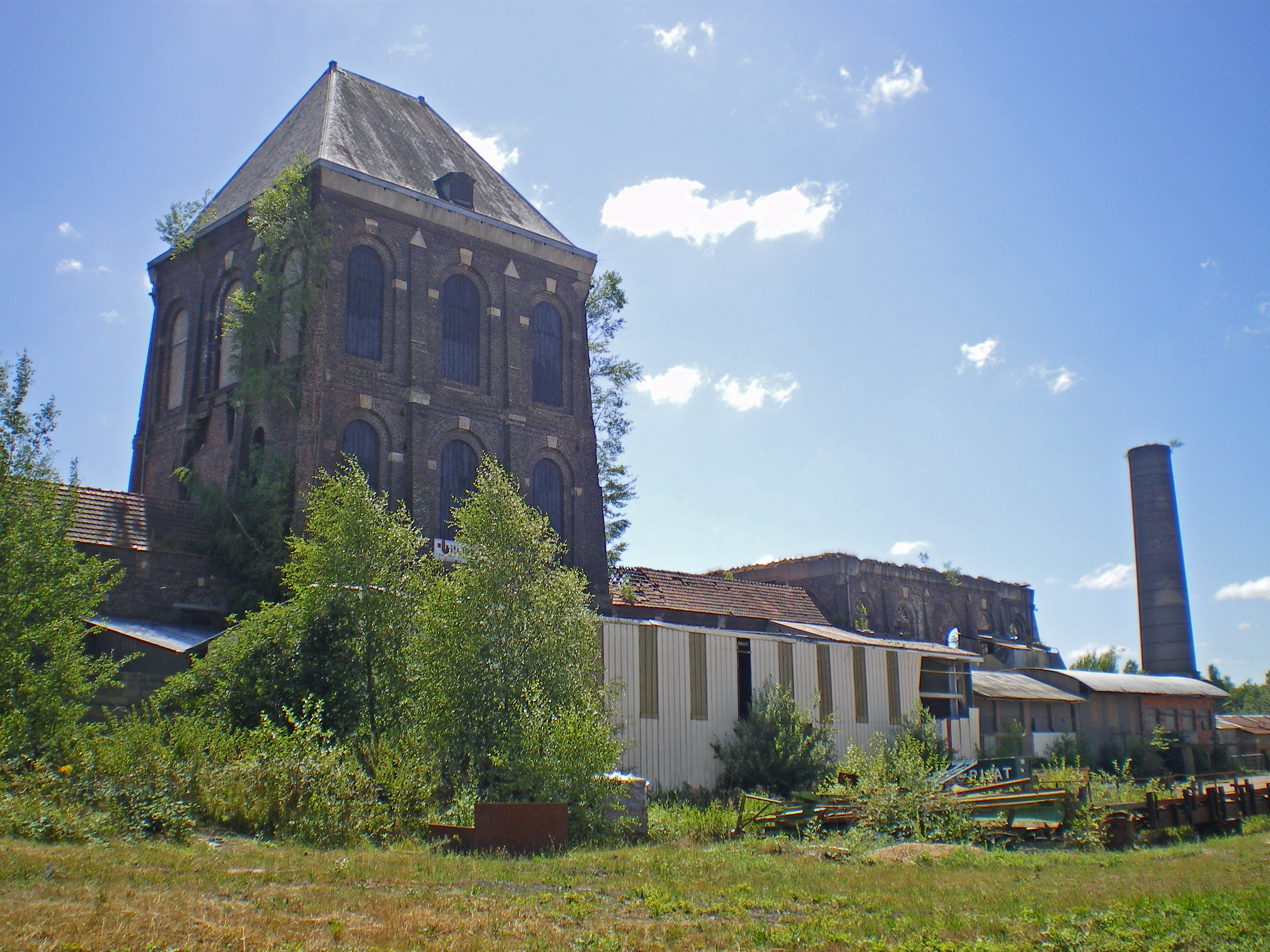
View of the Hottinguer mine tower in 2010.

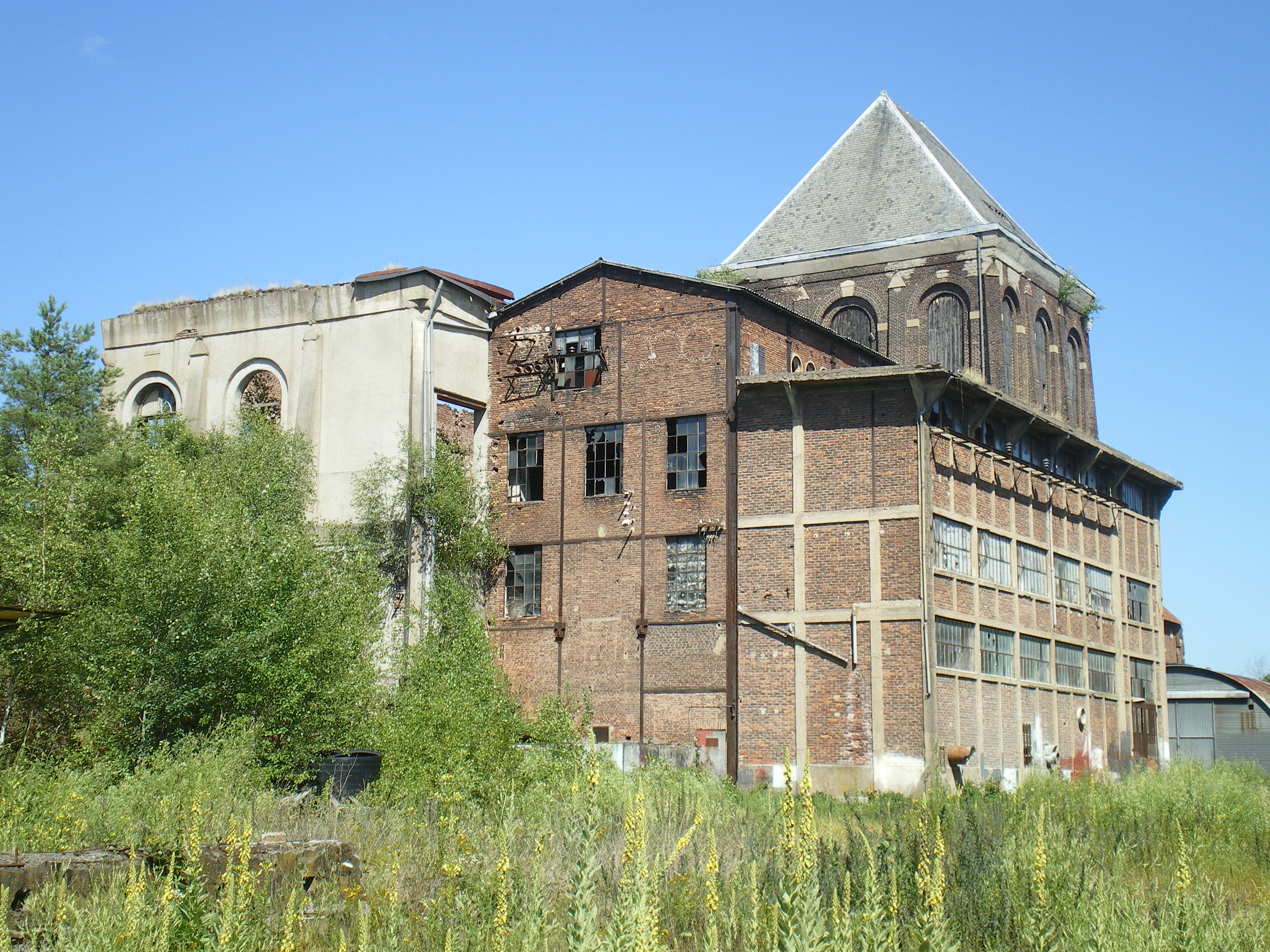
Another view of the Hottinguer mine.

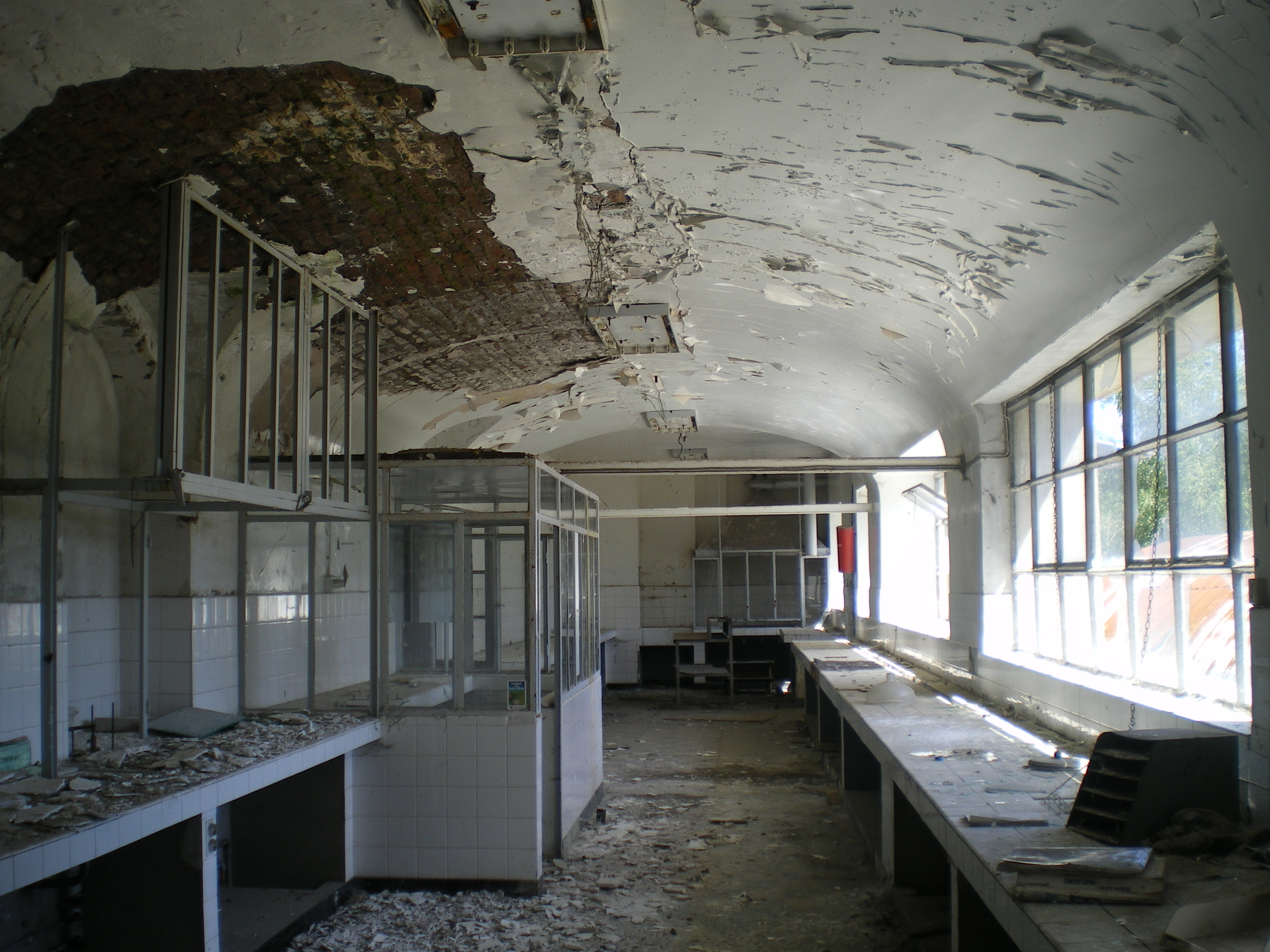
Ancien laboratoire de peinture attenant à la tour.

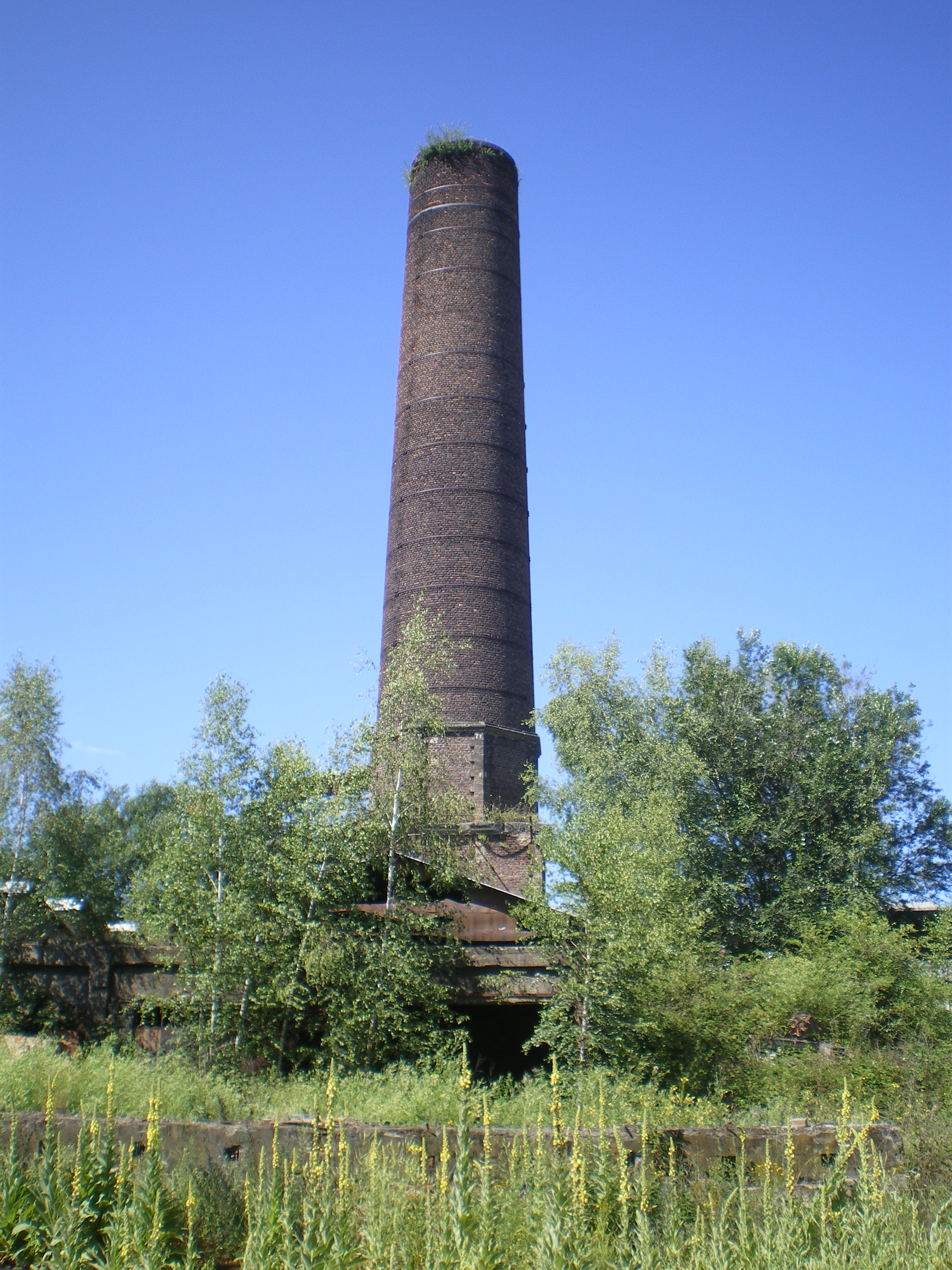
The chimney.

In 2012, the mine site is still disused. A committee bringing together members of local authorities, the State, the DRAC, and several associations discussed the rehabilitation of the Hottinguer mine. The mayor of Épinac presented the project for the site, which includes the renovation of the buildings and the installation of an eight-hectare photovoltaic power plant. The plant will be built on a former material storage and quarry site. Work is scheduled to take place throughout 10 to 15 years.

=== Remains ===
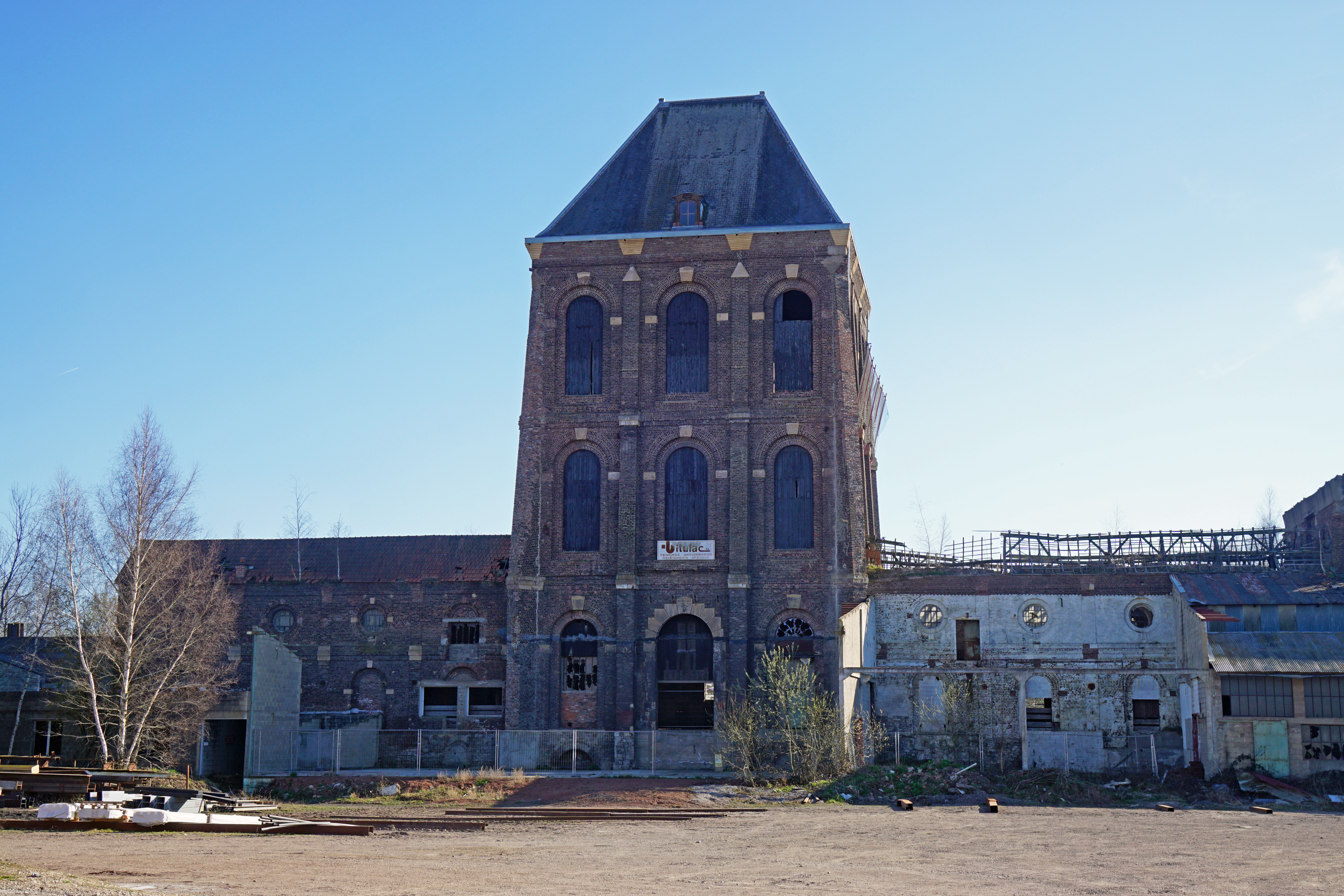
The site under construction in 2019.

In 2013, the shaft site is being rehabilitated. The remaining mining buildings are the Malakoff tower, its two wings (one of which has no roof), as well as a few annexes including the truncated chimney and surrounding ruins. More modern buildings constructed by the paint company are also on site. (Note: See photos from the Wikimedia Commons category.)

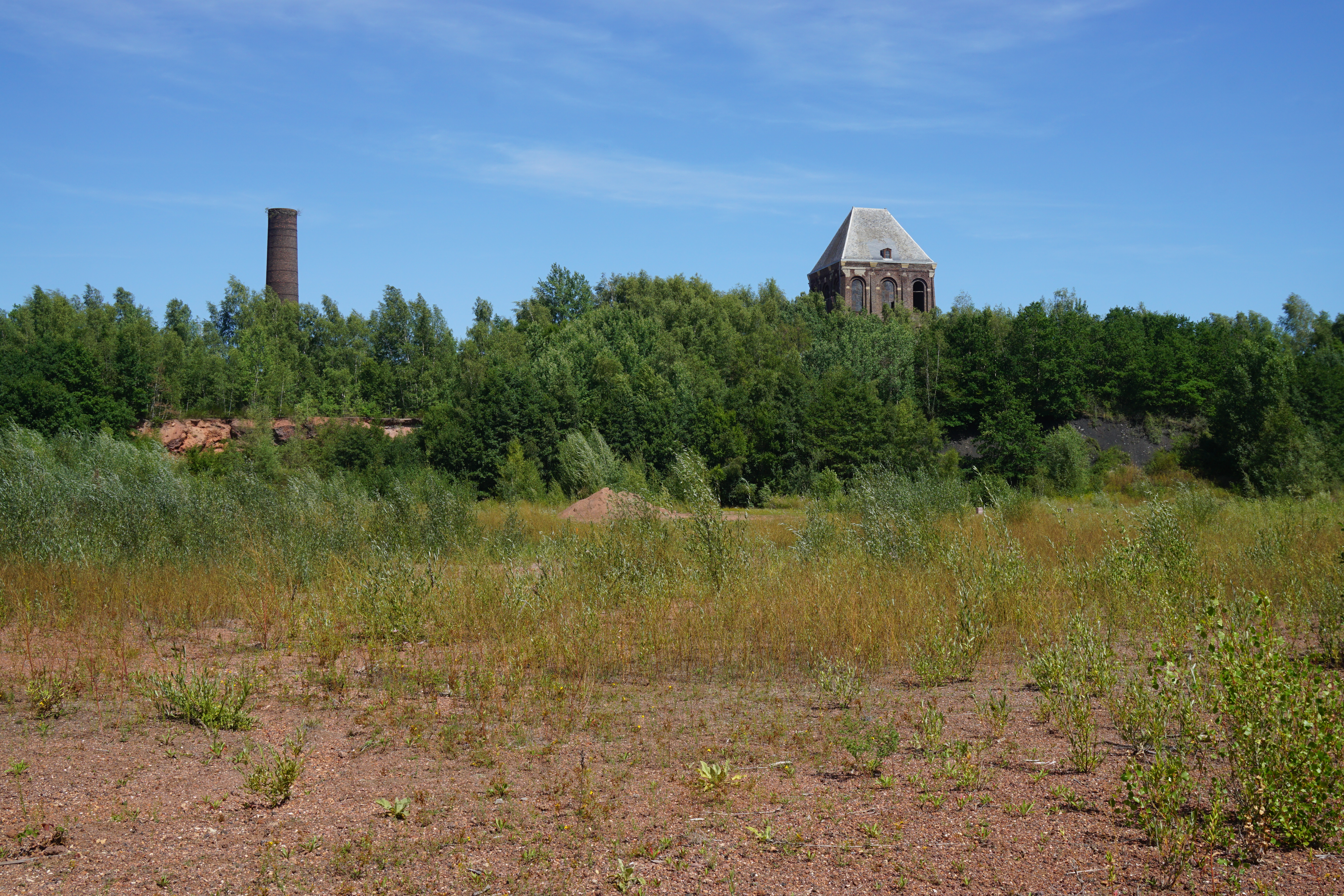
The mine seen from the slag heap.

=== Construction chronology ===
- For two weeks at the end of 2012, six young people cleared the buildings at the Hottinguer mine.
- From April to December 2013, a Tremplin integration project involving a dozen young people supervised by a company began renovating the vaults and arches of the side wings, as well as the tower's roof structure.
- In the spring of 2014, the Dufraigne company completed the restoration of the four wings adjoining the tower.
- Around 2015–2017, renovation of the tower.
- After 2017, construction work begins on the photovoltaic power plant.

== See also ==
- Épinac
- Épinac coal mine
- Montchanin coal mine
