= Épinac =

- Commune
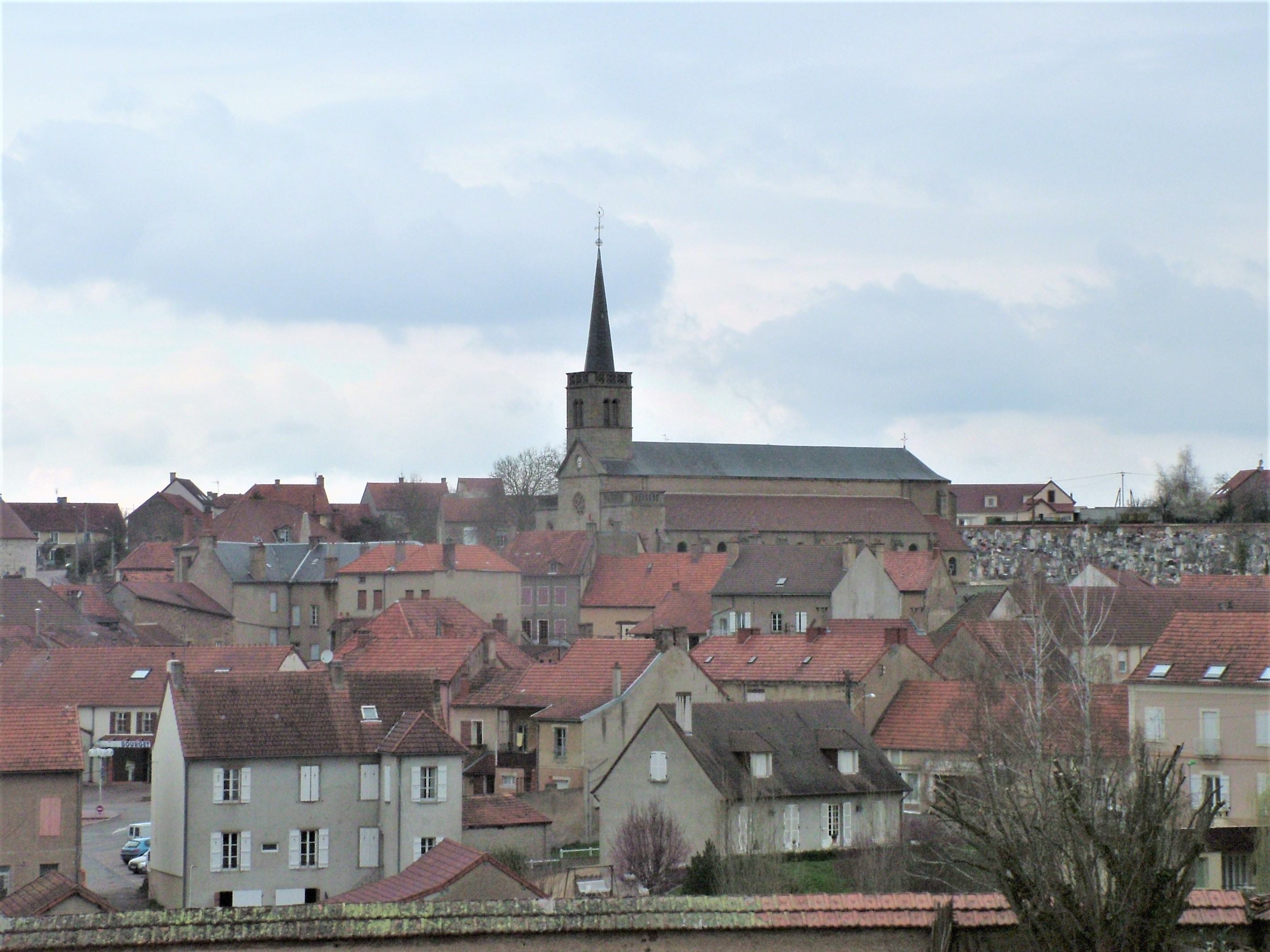
- Church and town centre

- Coat of arms
- Location of Épinac
- Location within France Location within Bourgogne-Franche-Comté
- Coordinates: 46°59′32″N 4°30′52″E
- Country: France
- Region: Bourgogne-Franche-Comté
- Department: Saône-et-Loire
- Arrondissement: Autun
- Canton: Autun-1
- Area^{1}: 25.77 km^{2} (9.95 sq mi)
- Elevation: 343 m (1,125 ft)
- Highest elevation: 475 m (1,558 ft)
- Lowest elevation: 314 m (1,030 ft)
- Population (2023): 2,168
  - Density: 84.13/km^{2} (217.9/sq mi)
- Time zone: UTC+01:00 (CET)
  - Summer (DST): UTC+02:00 (CEST)
- INSEE/Postal code: 71190 /71360
- ^{1} French Land Register data, which excludes lakes, ponds, glaciers > 1 km^{2} (0.386 sq mi or 247 acres) and river estuaries.

Épinac (French pronunciation: [epinak]) is a commune in the Saône-et-Loire department located in the region of Bourgogne-Franche-Comté in eastern France.

== Population ==
Historical population
Year	Pop.	±% p.a.
1968	3,120	—
1975	2,891	−1.08%
1982	2,636	−1.31%
1990	2,569	−0.32%
1999	2,522	−0.20%
2007	2,398	−0.63%
2012	2,320	−0.66%
2017	2,217	−0.90%
2023	2,168	−0.37%
Source: INSEE

== See also ==
- Communes of the Saône-et-Loire department
- Épinac coal mine
- Hottinguer coal mine
