= Decize =

- Commune
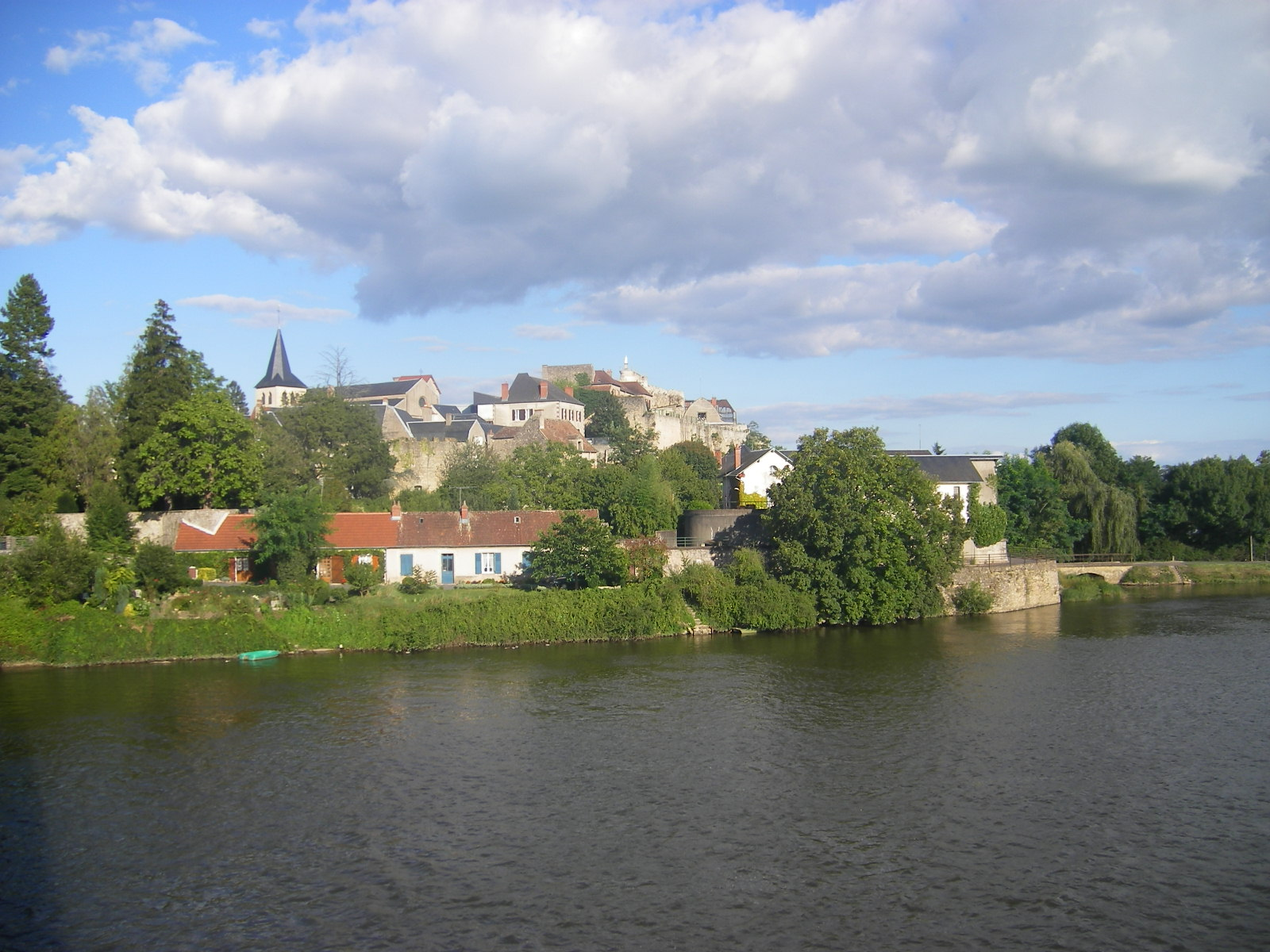
- Decize on the river Loire

- Coat of arms
- Location of Decize
- Location within France Location within Bourgogne-Franche-Comté
- Coordinates: 46°49′48″N 3°27′43″E
- Country: France
- Region: Bourgogne-Franche-Comté
- Department: Nièvre
- Arrondissement: Nevers
- Canton: Decize
- Intercommunality: Sud Nivernais

Government
  - Mayor (2020–2026): Justine Guyot
- Area^{1}: 48.22 km^{2} (18.62 sq mi)
- Highest elevation: 243 m (797 ft)
- Lowest elevation: 183 m (600 ft)
- Population (2023): 4,932
  - Density: 102.3/km^{2} (264.9/sq mi)
- Time zone: UTC+01:00 (CET)
  - Summer (DST): UTC+02:00 (CEST)
- INSEE/Postal code: 58095 /58300
- ^{1} French Land Register data, which excludes lakes, ponds, glaciers > 1 km^{2} (0.386 sq mi or 247 acres) and river estuaries.

Decize is a commune in the Nièvre department in central France.

== Geography ==
The town is situated on a former island in the Loire ("en Loire assise") at the confluence of the Aron river. The right channel of the Loire was dammed up to reclaim land and now remains as an arm ("la Vieille Loire") stretching upstream to the centre of town. The Loire at this point is an important navigation point as it forms the junction between the Canal du Nivernais and the Canal latéral à la Loire both of which are within the town boundaries.

== History ==
Decize is an ancient settlement first noted in the Commentarii de Bello Gallico where Julius Caesar settled a dispute involving the Decetiae from whom comes the town's name—in Roman times the town’s name was Decetia in Gallia Lugdunensis. In later times it belonged to the counts of Nevers, from whom it obtained a charter of franchise in 1226.

== People ==
- Guy Coquille (1523–1603), French jurist, was born here. There is a statue of him in the town.
- Louis de Saint-Just (1767–1794), a major figure in the French Revolution, was born here.
- Marguerite Monnot (1903–1961), songwriter and composer

== Demographics ==
Historical population
Year	Pop.	±% p.a.
1968	7,175	—
1975	7,528	+0.69%
1982	7,437	−0.17%
1990	6,876	−0.98%
1999	6,456	−0.70%
2007	5,903	−1.11%
2012	5,711	−0.66%
2017	5,393	−1.14%
2023	4,932	−1.48%
Source: INSEE

== Tourism ==
In 2011 a new port for pleasure boats in the "Bassin de la Jonction" between the Lateral Canal and the Loire was opened.

== See also ==
- Communes of the Nièvre department
- Decize coal mine
