= Decize coal mine =

Former coal mining operations in Decize and La Machine, Nièvre, France

Decize Coal Mines
- Location of the Decize-La Machine coal basin within French coal basins.

- Location within France
- Location: La Machine, Decize, Bourgogne-Franche-Comté, France; 46.83°N 3.46°E
- Products: Coal
- Opened: 15th century
- Closed: 1974

The Decize Coal Mines were a significant coal mining operation within the Decize-La Machine coal basin, located in the Nièvre department of Bourgogne-Franche-Comté, France. Coal extraction in the region is documented from the 15th century, with industrial operations peaking in the 19th and 20th centuries under the Schneider Company from 1869 to 1946. Nationalized in 1946 under Charbonnages de France, the mines were integrated with the Blanzy Coal Mines until their closure in 1974 after five centuries of activity. The mining legacy endures through preserved remnants such as mine entrances, slag heaps, railways, ruins, workers' housing, and repurposed buildings, profoundly shaping the region's economic, social, environmental, and cultural landscape.

== Location ==
Coal deposits in Nièvre. Decize-La Machine South Nivernais

The coal basin is situated in La Machine, north of Decize, in southern Nièvre, within the Bourgogne-Franche-Comté region of eastern France. The mining operations were centered in La Machine, a key industrial hub in the region.

== History ==
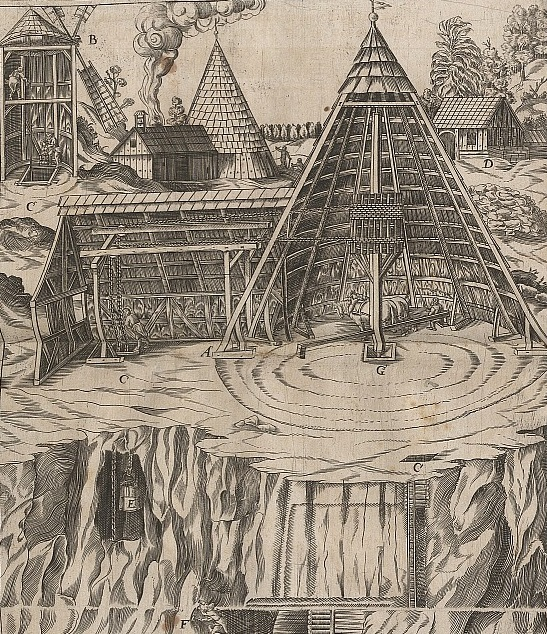
Illustration of a baritel, a horse-powered winch, from 1650.

=== Origins of La Machine ===
The town of La Machine derives its name from a baritel, a horse-powered winch installed in 1689 by workers from Liège. These workers had gained renown for constructing the Machine de Marly, the largest mechanism of its time, at Versailles. Engineer Daniel Michel, a cousin of the Machine de Marly's builder Rennequin Sualem, arrived in Nièvre in 1689 to install the baritel, later settling in the region. His descendants continued his work, and a street in La Machine still bears his name.

=== Early Exploitation ===
Coal mining in Decize is first recorded in a 1488 contract, marking the earliest evidence of surface coal extraction. Initially, mining involved shallow pits or hillside excavations to supply local forges, managed by the Dukes of Nevers, the Saint Pierre de Decize Priory, and the Lord of Écots. Before the 13th century, little documentation exists, but land was divided among the Lordship of Écots (under the Bailliage of Nevers), the Dukes of Nevers, and the Minimes Priory of Saint Pierre. These landowners permitted charcoal burners to extract coal from their forests. In 1489, a charcoal burner named Loison was authorized to extract ten cartloads of coal weekly. Over a hundred small pits, known as “crots,” were dug in the woodlands.

In 1669, Jean-Baptiste Colbert noted the region's mining potential during a visit, prompting financier Henry Landry to lease the lands (except those of the Duke of Nevers) for exploitation. Landry employed 200 Liège miners and engineer Daniel Michel, who introduced baritels, pumps, and drive wheels, and dug new mine shafts. Over 200 mules transported coal to the Loire River at Decize. However, operations declined after Louis XIV’s wars and naval defeats, leading to successive entrepreneurs abandoning the mines. In 1776, the Duke of Nevers leased coal operations under the Glénons forest to Pinet and Gounot, who already worked the Minimes and Écots forests. By a decree of 13 May 1780, they gained rights to exploit the entire region's mines, which were transferred to Boudart in 1784. A steam engine was installed in 1782, but the unprofitable mine was abandoned. The French Revolution exacerbated the situation, with the mine's owner fleeing to England, leading to its sequestration. It passed through several owners, becoming state property by 1794, before returning to Mallevault in 1806. By 1801, the mine had eight shafts reaching 80 metres (260 ft) and produced 8,000 tonnes (7,900 long tons; 8,800 short tons) annually.

=== First Companies (1816–1868) ===
In 1816, a Société anonyme des mines de houille de Decize (Decize Coal Mines Limited Company) was created. It performed major works, installed several steam engines, and ordered over 300 miners' lamps. Rolling mills were installed in what became an industrialized coal mine. It employed 56 people in 1835. Considering their entourage, it is estimated that over 1,700 people were already dependent on the operation. The town was home to 80 housing units and barracks with around ten apartments. The Loire at Decize became the main hub for transporting coal to the French arsenals. Local industries (glassworks) used this fuel to heat their products. By 1842, production had risen to 40,000 tons, and the coal mine was ranked 11th among French coal mines. This attracted new investors.

=== Schneider Company (1869–1946) ===
After 1860, demand for coal increased. The development of industrial basins benefited the coal mines of Saint-Étienne, Commentry, and Blanzy. The factories at Le Creusot needed more and more coal for their blast furnaces. It was for this reason that the La Machine coal mine was bought out in 1869 by the Schneider company, then France's largest (over 10,000 employees). Eugène I Schneider and his brother Adolphe Schneider acquired the 8,000-hectare Decize coal concession. After a few adjustments, production soon rose to over 150,000 tons a year, all of which was absorbed by the Creusot iron and steel industry. The financial and industrial resources of the Schneiders enabled the modernization of equipment and the construction of roads, churches, schools, marshalling yards, workers' housing estates, locks, and forges. The paternalism of the company's managers improved living conditions for miners' families in their housing estates. In this way, the mine lived quietly for almost 80 years under the reign of the Schneiders.

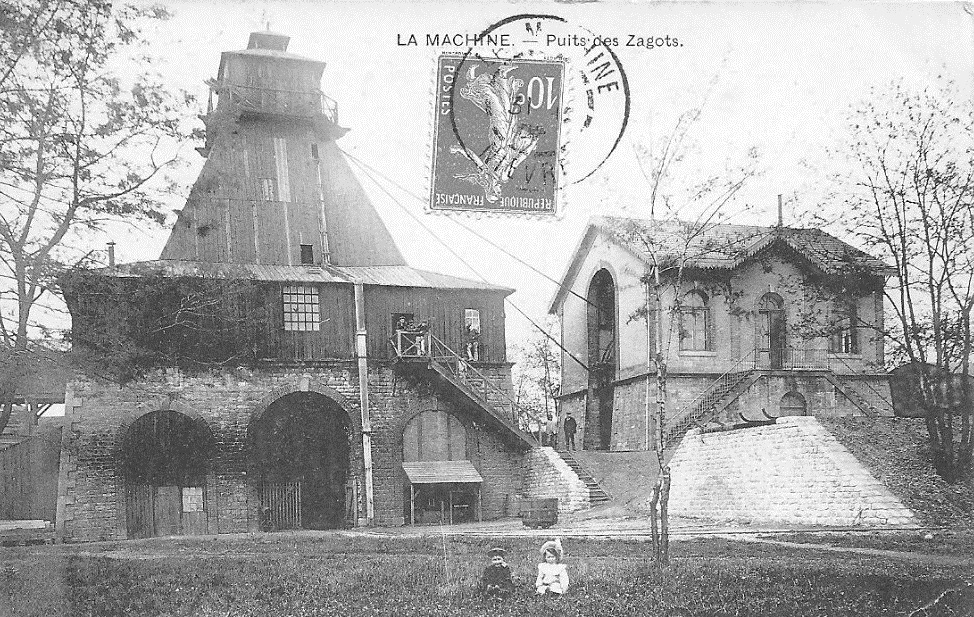
Puits des Zagots (Zagots pithead).

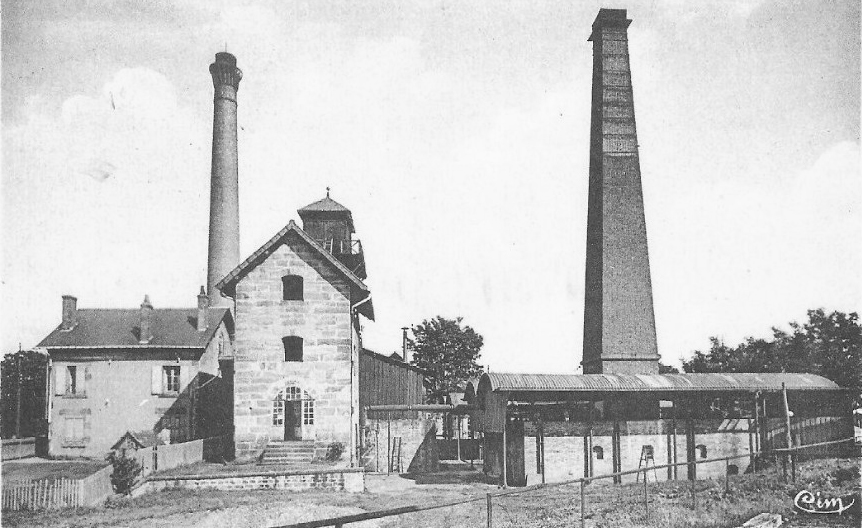
Puits de la Chapelle (The Chapelle pithead).

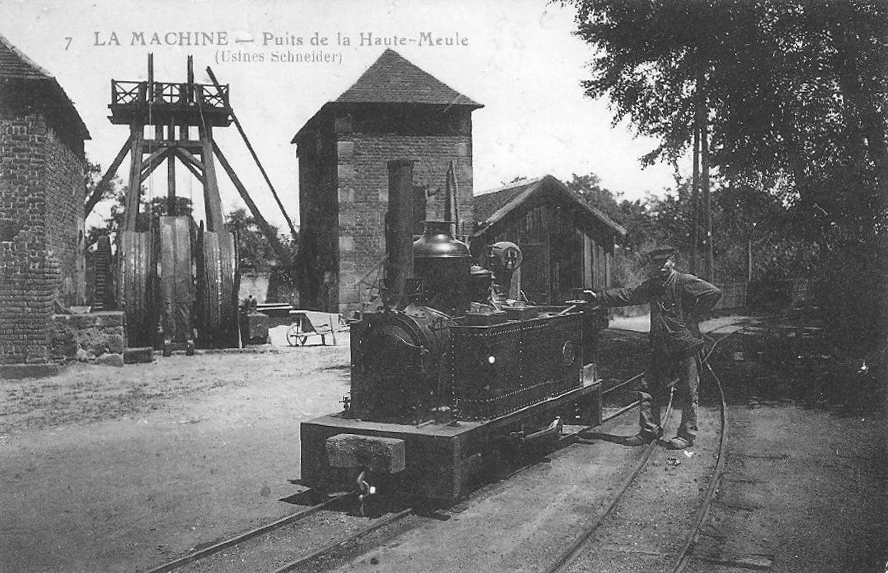
Puits de la Haute-Meule (Haute-Meule pithead).

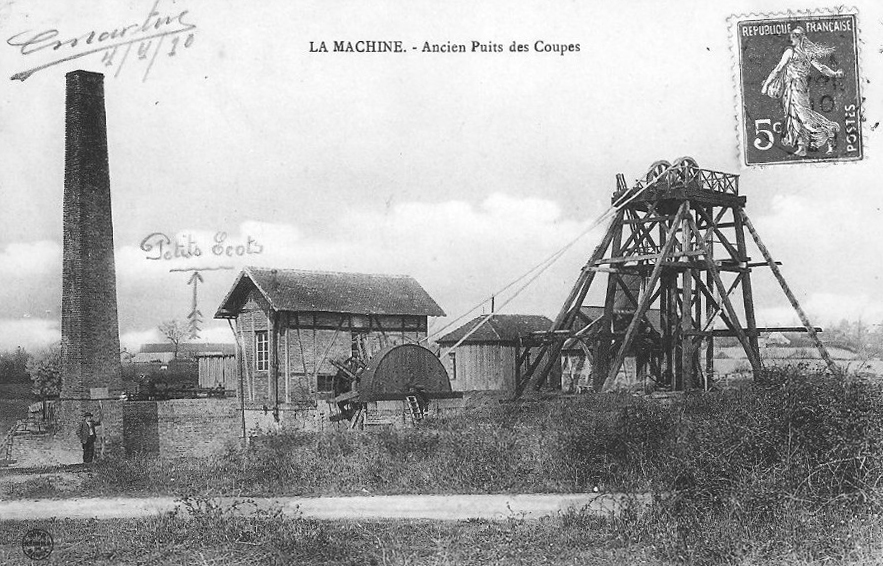
Puits des Coupes (Coupes pithead).

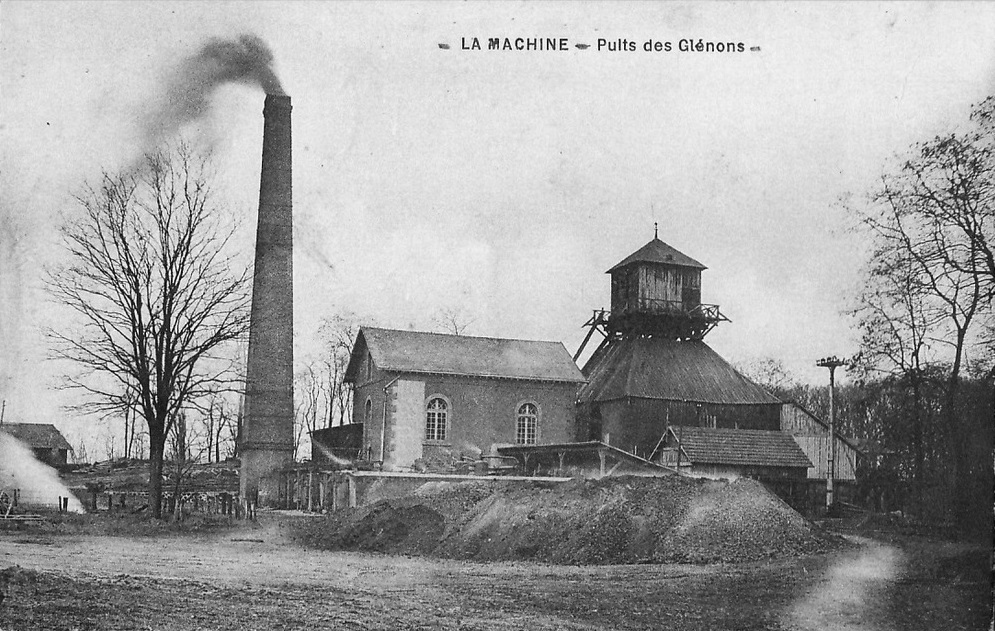
Puits des Glénons (Glénons pithead).

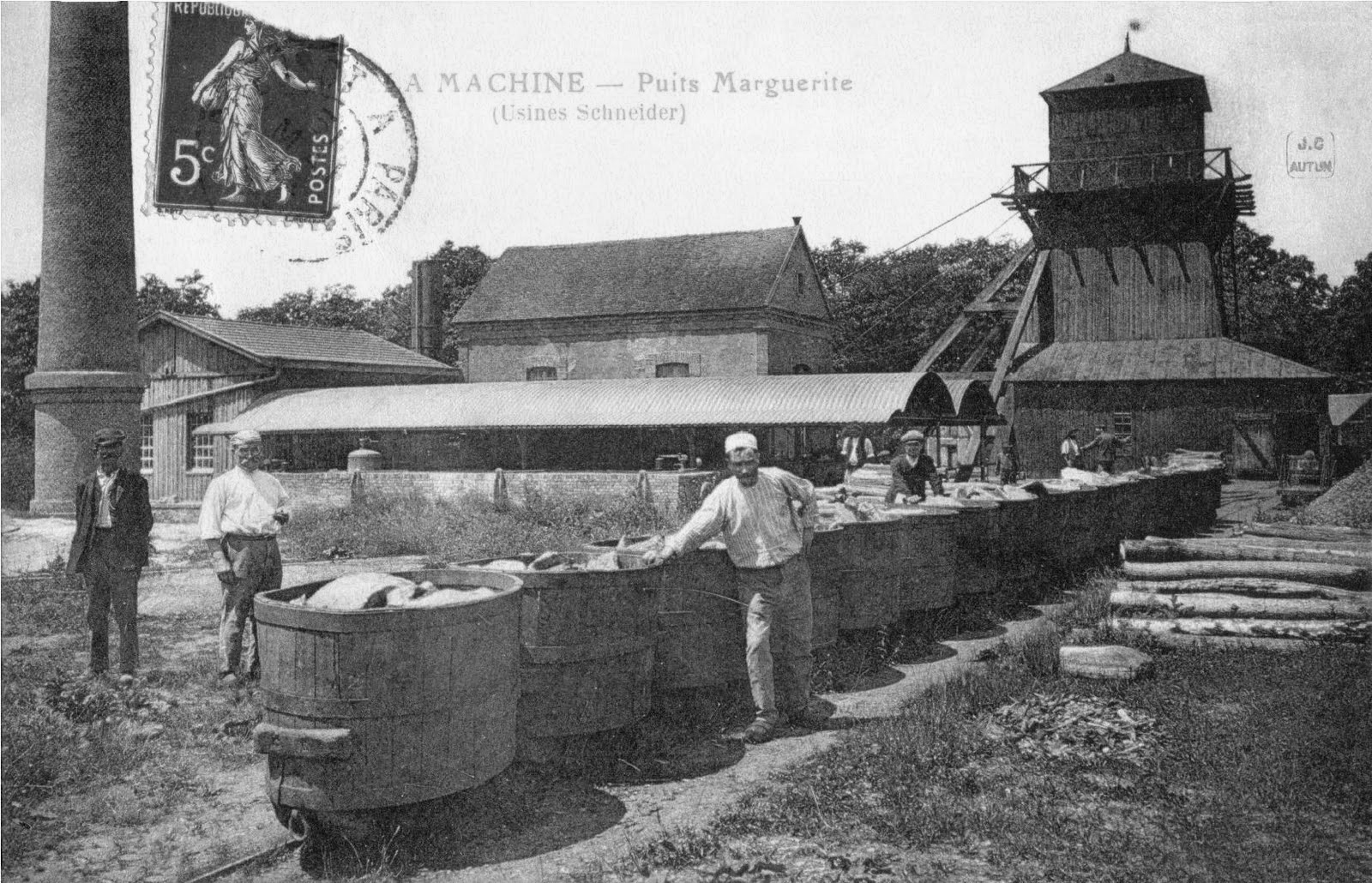
Puits Marguerite (Marguerite pithead).

At the time of nationalization, the town had a population of over 6,000, a quarter of whom worked in the mine. Most of the latter were housed in workers' housing estates built by the Company near the shafts:

- Cité Sainte-Marie (1856–1857);
- Cité Sainte-Eudoxie (1878);
- Cité des Zagots (1917–1918);
- Cité des Minimes (1922–1938).

Workers' housing

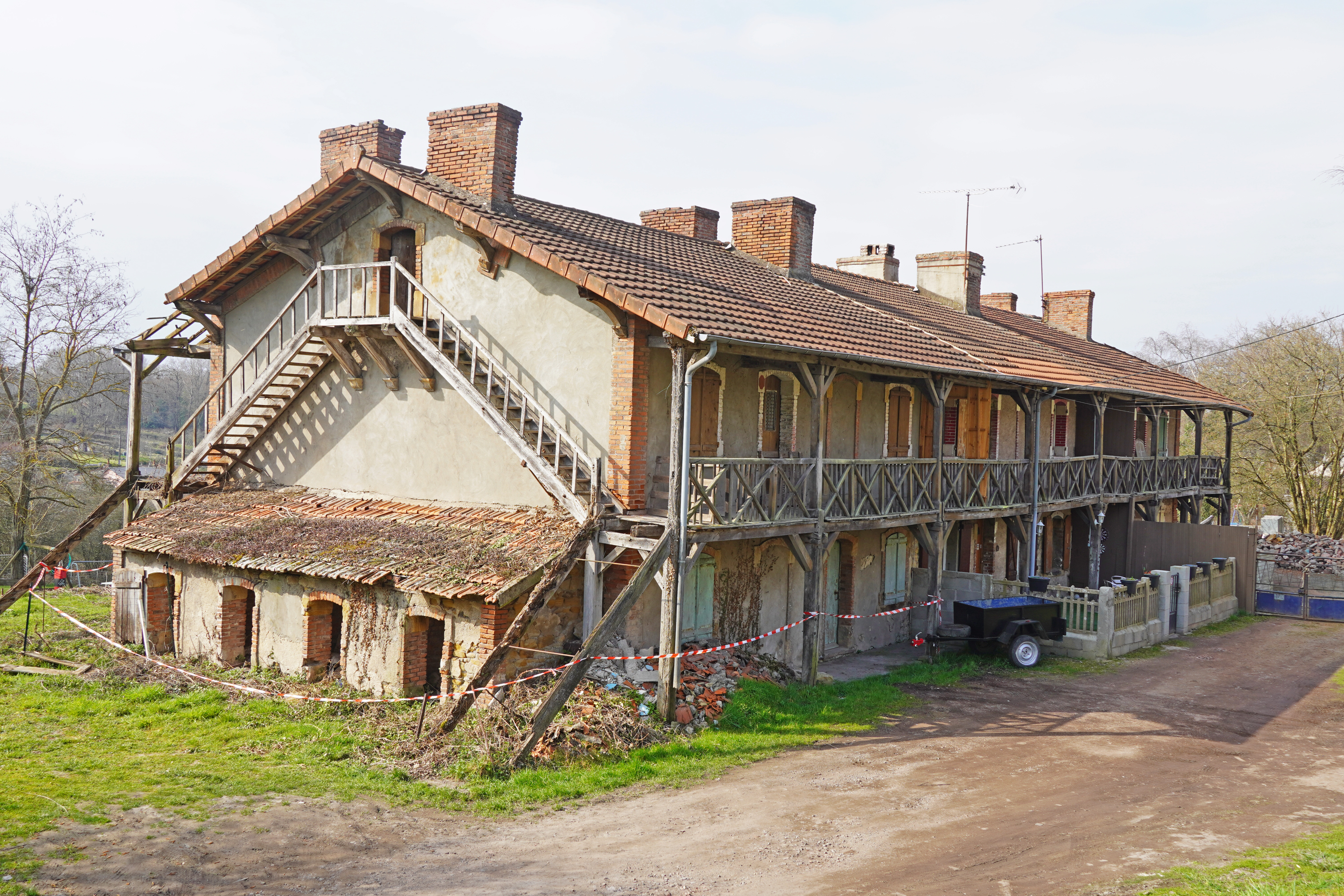
Phalanstère (cooperative housing) at Zagots pit.

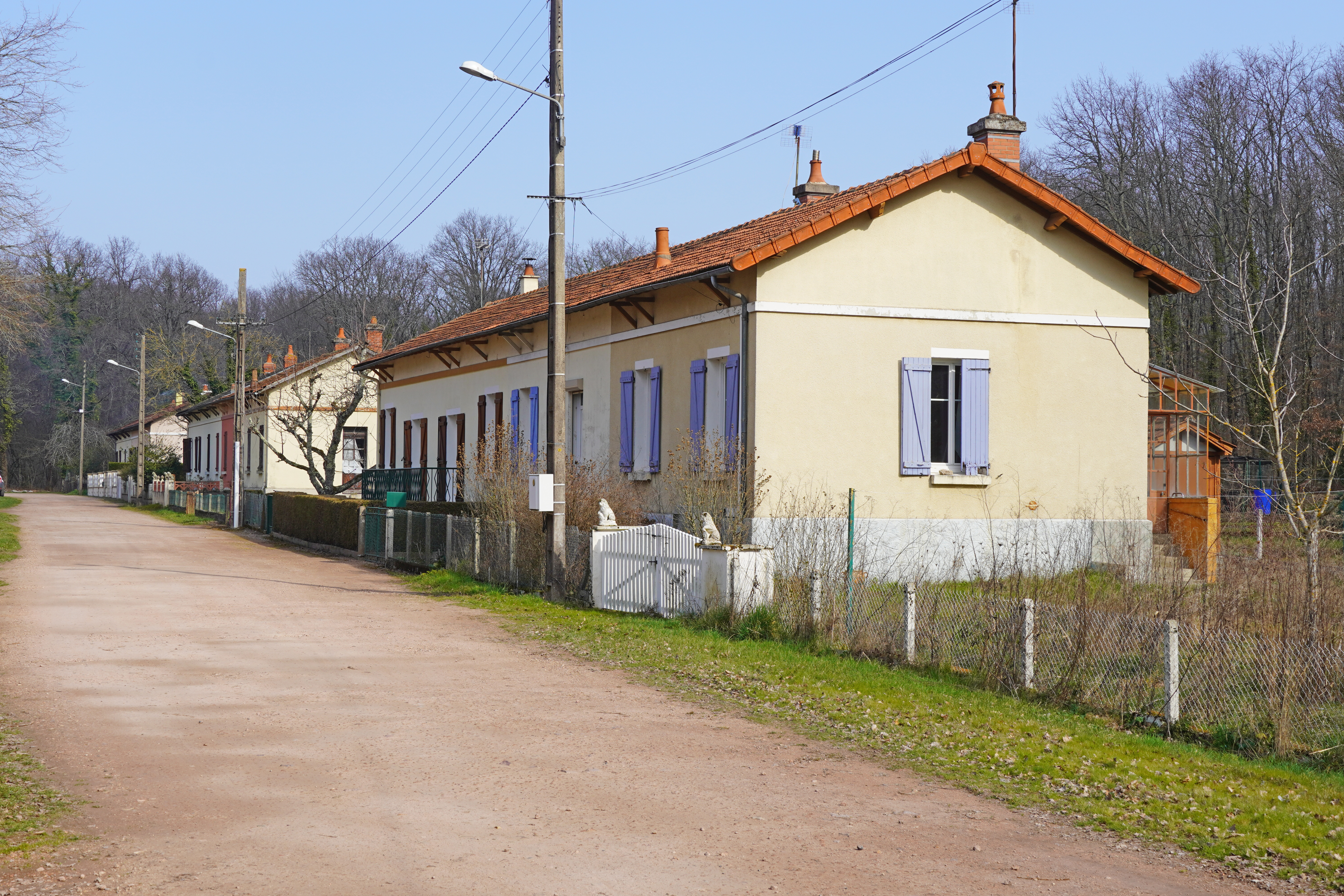
Miner's cottage at Sainte-Marguerite and Henri-Paul pits.

=== 1890 Disaster ===
On February 18, 1890, a coal dust explosion devastated the Marguerite shaft. Two mine blasts, fired too close together, were a long time coming. The first raised a cloud of coal dust; the second set the dust ablaze, and the fire spread like lightning through the galleries. All the workers in the gallery from which the blast had originated were burned, more or less severely, or asphyxiated. Fifteen workers were pulled out dead. Three more corpses were later discovered under a landslide. Eight men who had been brought up alive were to die that evening or the following day. Unfortunately, as the Zagots well was partly ventilated by the Marguerite well, toxic gases spread through it, claiming seventeen victims. In all, 43 people died in this disaster—the worst disaster in the basin's history. The disaster's toll was mitigated as the day was a holiday, reducing the number of workers present.

=== 1943 Work Conditions ===
In 1943, under Schneider's ownership, the mines were managed by director D. Charroux. Miners were divided into two categories: Category 1 (over 30 hours weekly) and Category 2 (under 30 hours). These conditions reflected the company's structured labor management during wartime.

=== Nationalization and Closure (1946–1974) ===
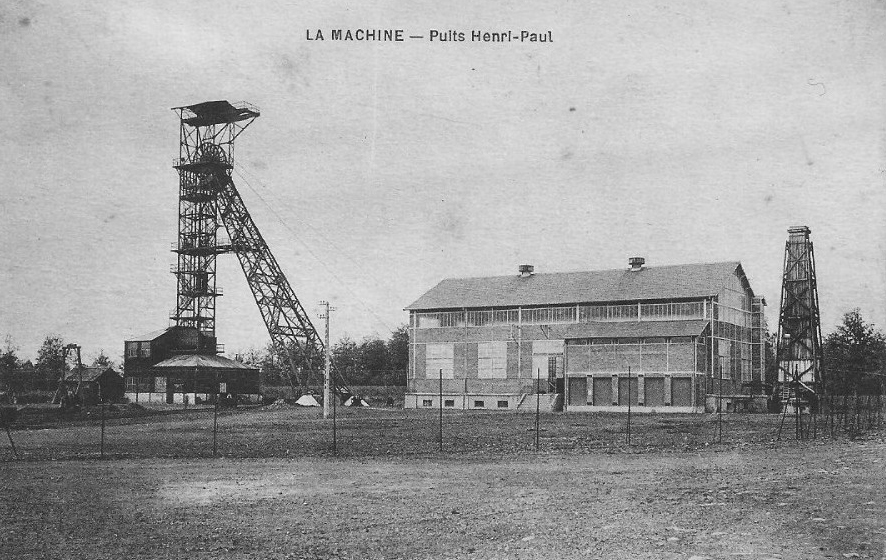
The Henri-Paul pit.

After World War II, France's “Battle of Coal” led to the nationalization of all mines. On 28 June 1946, the Decize mines were acquired by Charbonnages de France and integrated with the Blanzy Coal Mines. Miners gained improved conditions, including early retirement at 50, healthcare, social protections, and paid leave. However, detachment from Le Creusot weakened the mine, reducing it to a minor satellite of Blanzy, ranking ninth in central France's production. Investments in mechanization and infrastructure continued until 1957, but the shift to oil, gas, and nuclear energy sealed coal's decline. By 1961, pits like Henri-Paul and Zagots closed, and production fell to 0.5% of national output by 1967. The final pit closed in 1974.

=== Post-Mining Era ===
Upon closure in 1974, Charbonnages de France managed miner reconversion: 507 of 800 workers retired, about 100 were reassigned to Montceau-les-Mines, and others sought work elsewhere. La Machine lost over half its population and its sole industry, leaving the town economically devastated.

=== Preservation Efforts ===
On 3 May 1970, former miners founded the Association Machinoise pour la Conservation du Souvenir Minier (Machinese Association for the Conservation of Mining Remembrance) to preserve mining heritage. Their efforts saved the Glénons pit from demolition, collecting artifacts, documents, and testimonies. The miners’ school was converted for public visits, and a museum opened in 1983 in former administrative buildings, attracting over 250,000 visitors.

=== Surface Infrastructure ===
Post-1869, Schneider constructed key surface buildings, including a large courtyard with administrative offices, forges, and stables, near the directors’ château. The Glénons pit retains its headframe, built in Le Creusot and relocated in 1938, alongside the miners’ school, now a visitor site. Former washing and sorting facilities were demolished, replaced by the Grénetier pond and surrounding forest.

=== Transport ===
In 1841, La Machine pioneered a unique horse-drawn railway with five dry locks or wagon elevators, replacing donkey transport. These used a counterweight system where loaded wagons descending hills raised empty ones, eliminating external power needs. This system, inspired by canal navigation, was replaced in 1873 by steam locomotives and a gently sloped railway.

== Heritage ==
=== Museum ===
The mines closed on 1 August 1974. The Glénons pit, preserved with its headframe, shaft station, and winding engine building, houses the Museum of the Mine of La Machine, alongside other mining structures.

Museum and remnants

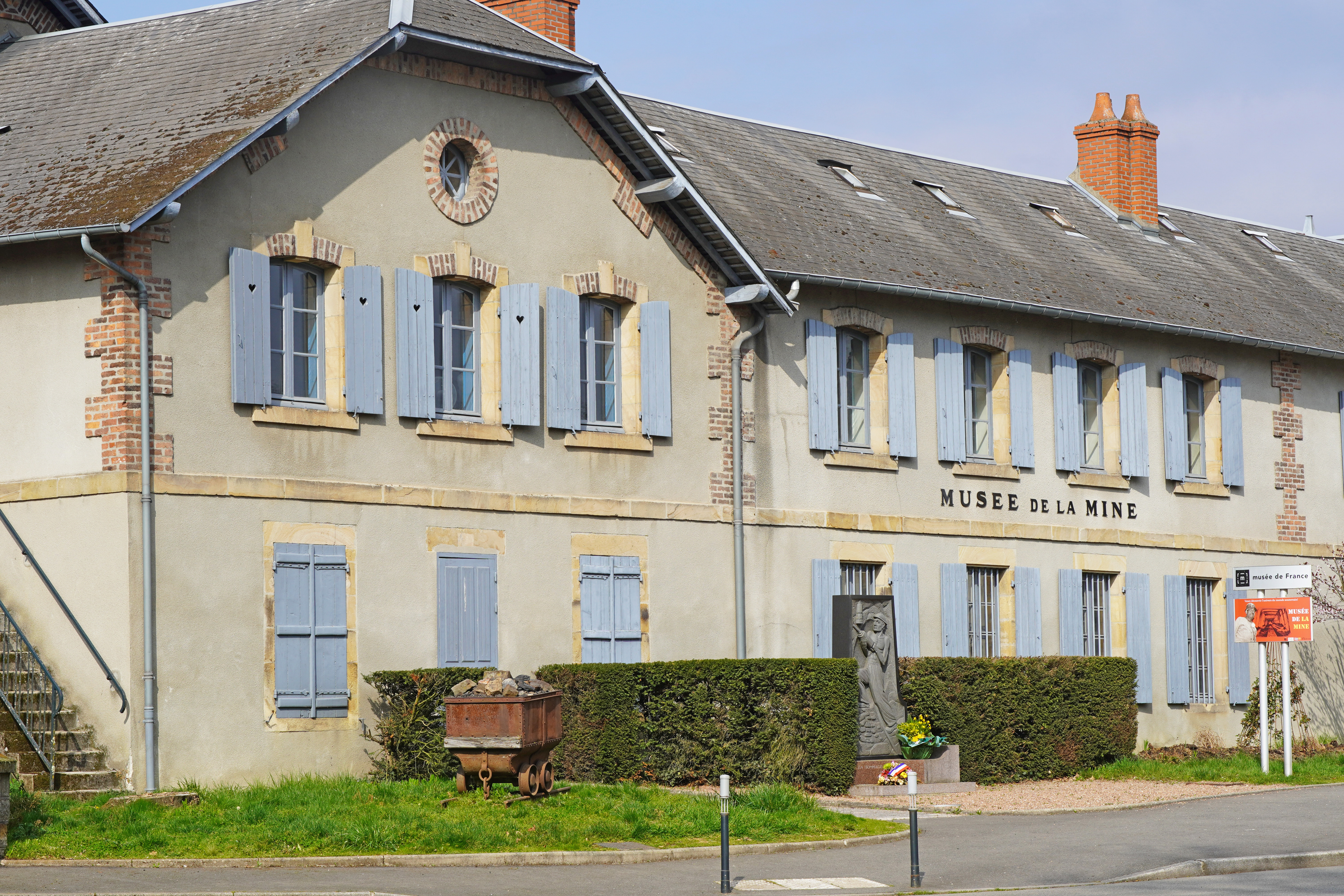
The Museum of the Mine of La Machine.

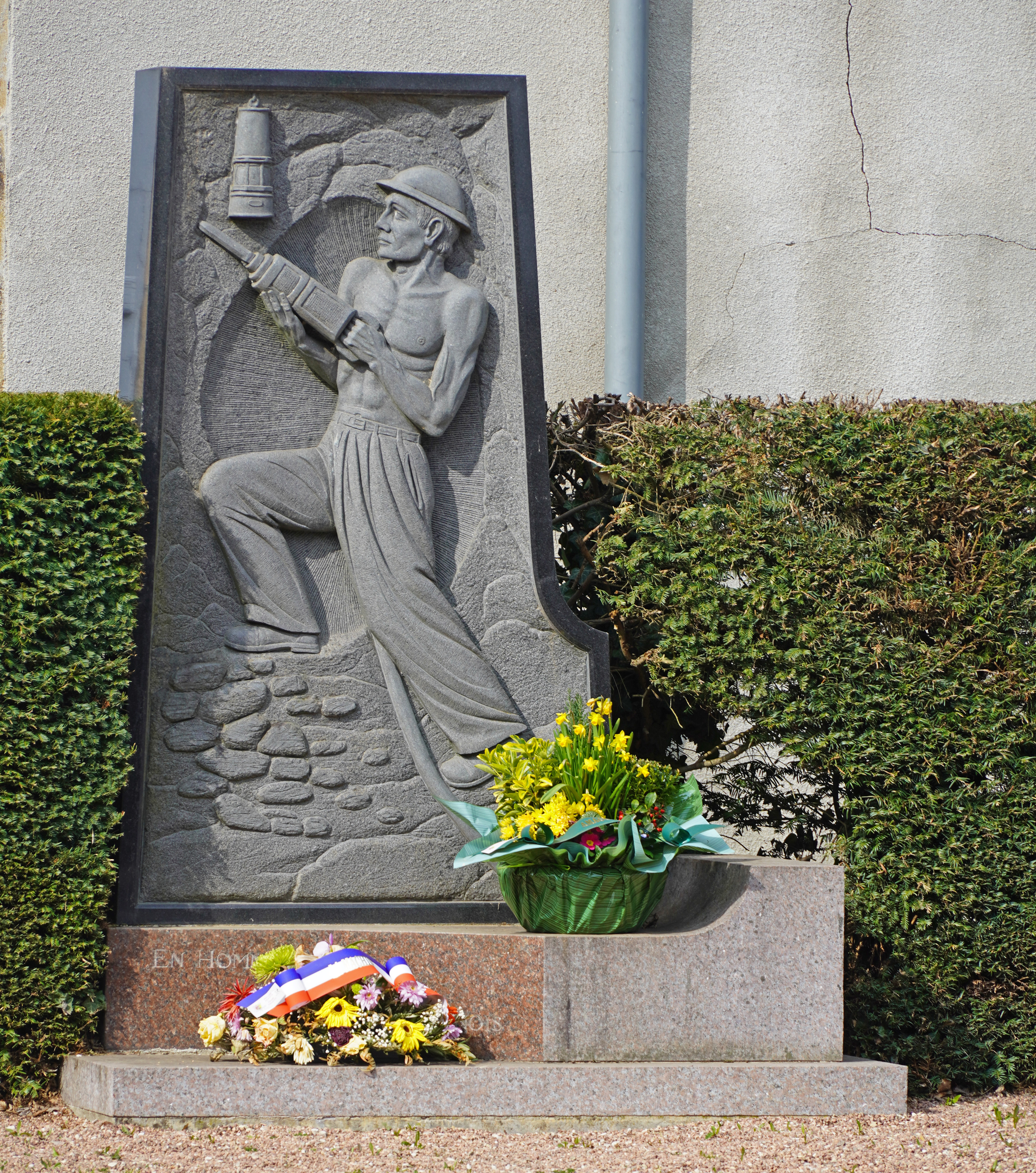
The memorial.

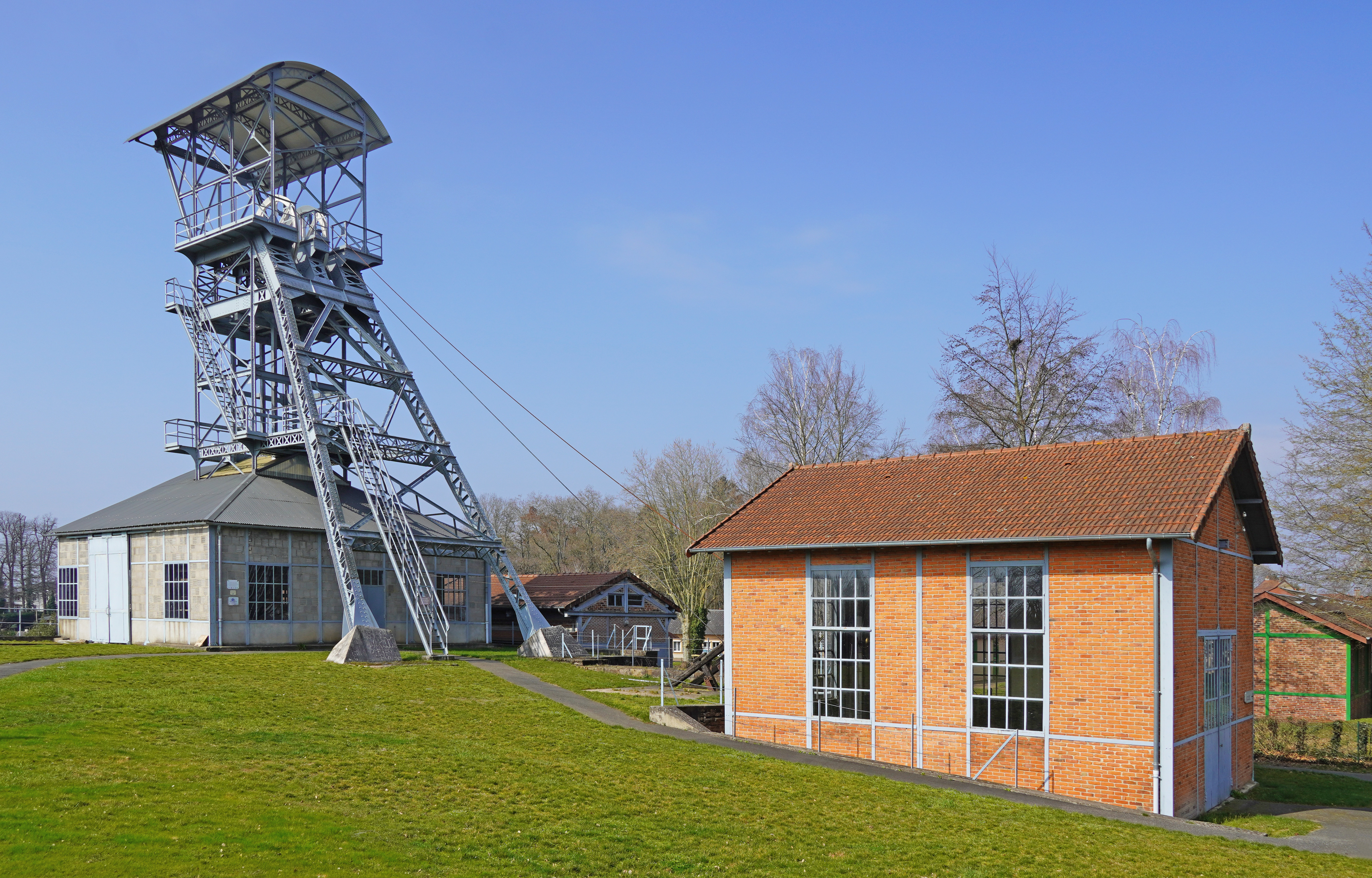
The Glénons pit.

=== Other Remnants ===
Remaining mining relics include abandoned or repurposed slag heaps, industrial buildings, and structures like the Minimes and Chapelle pits, some sealed or in ruins.

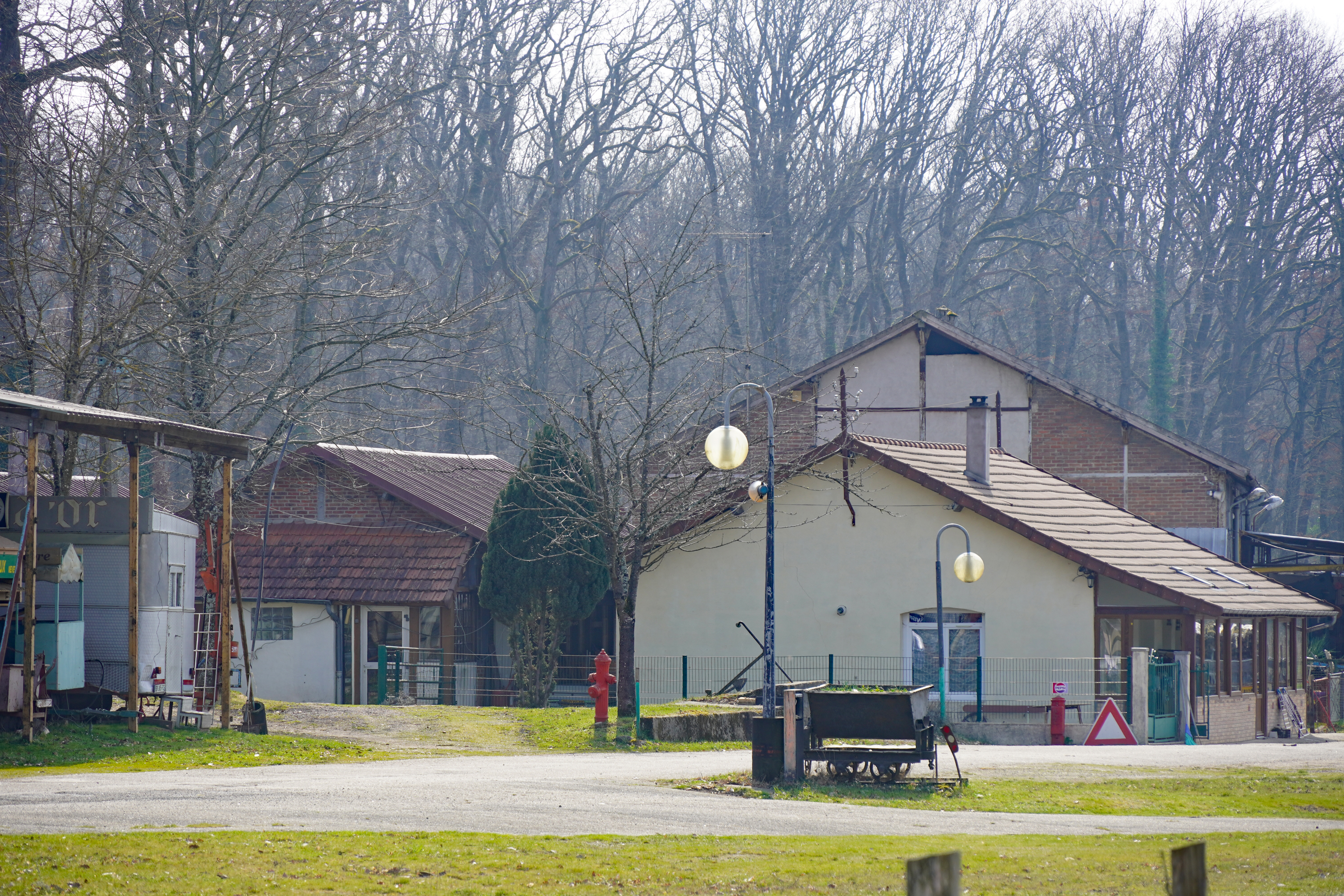
Former Minimes pithead building.

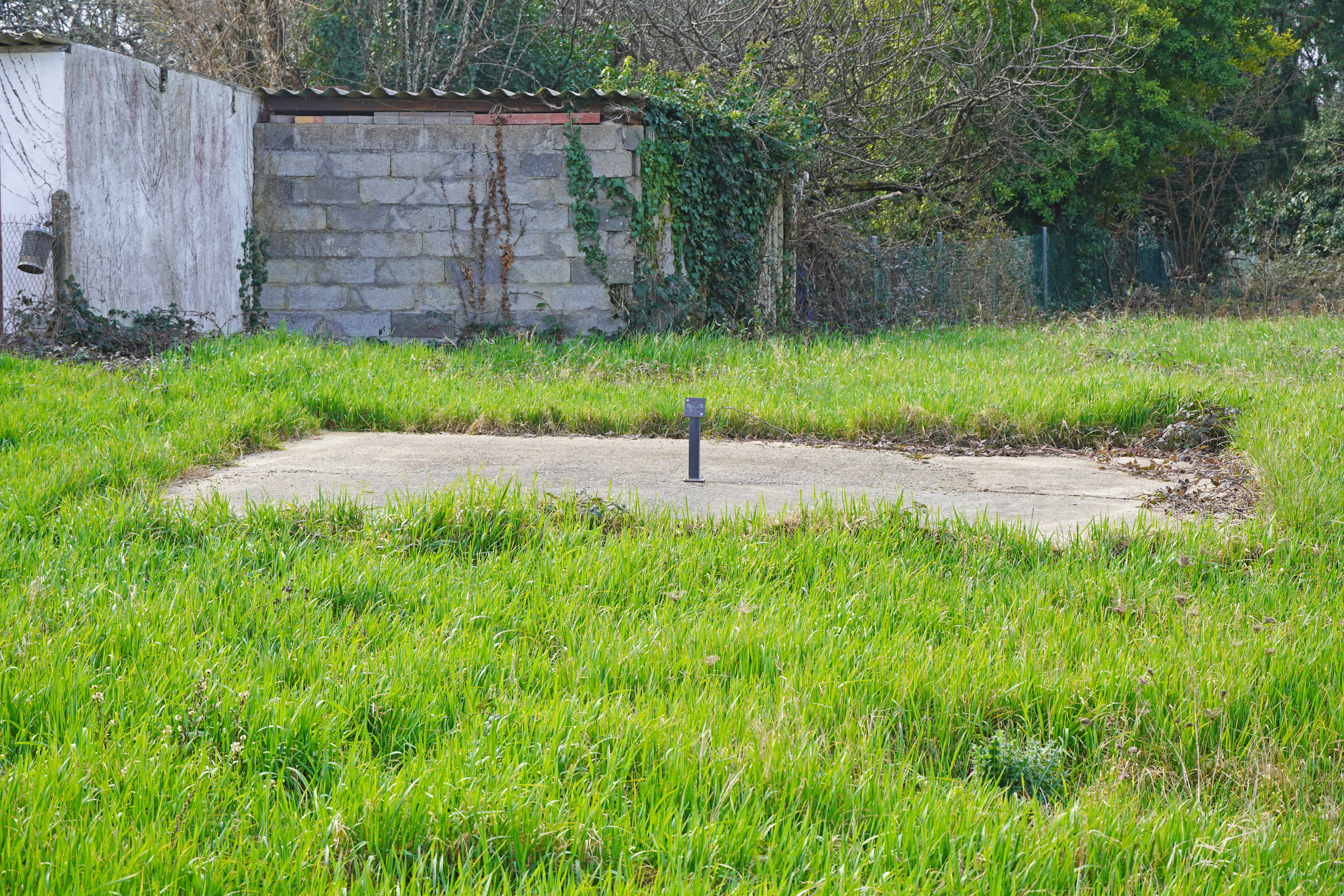
The Chapelle mineshaft closed by a concrete slab.

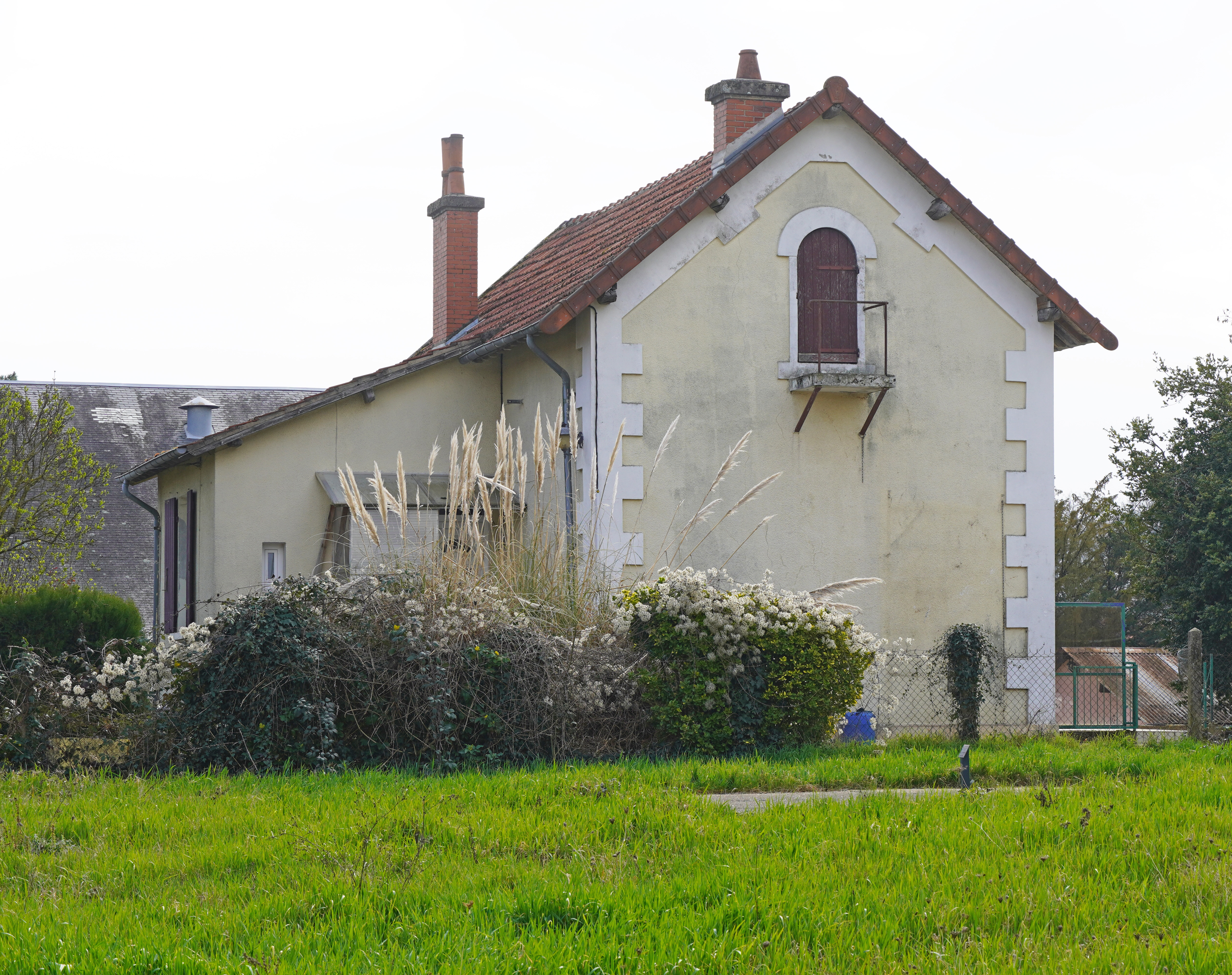
Former building of the Chapelle pithead.

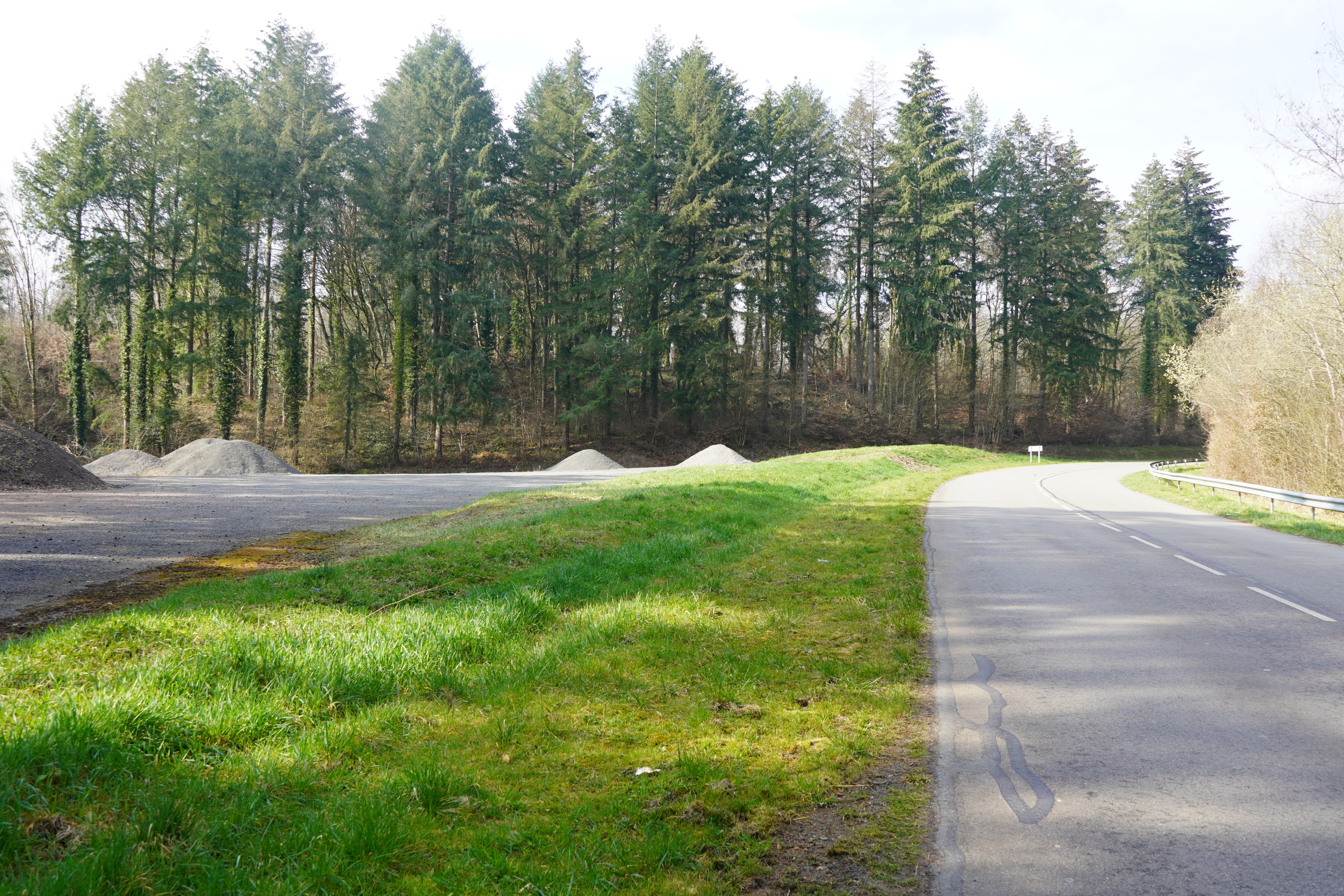
Spoil heap of Haute-Meule.

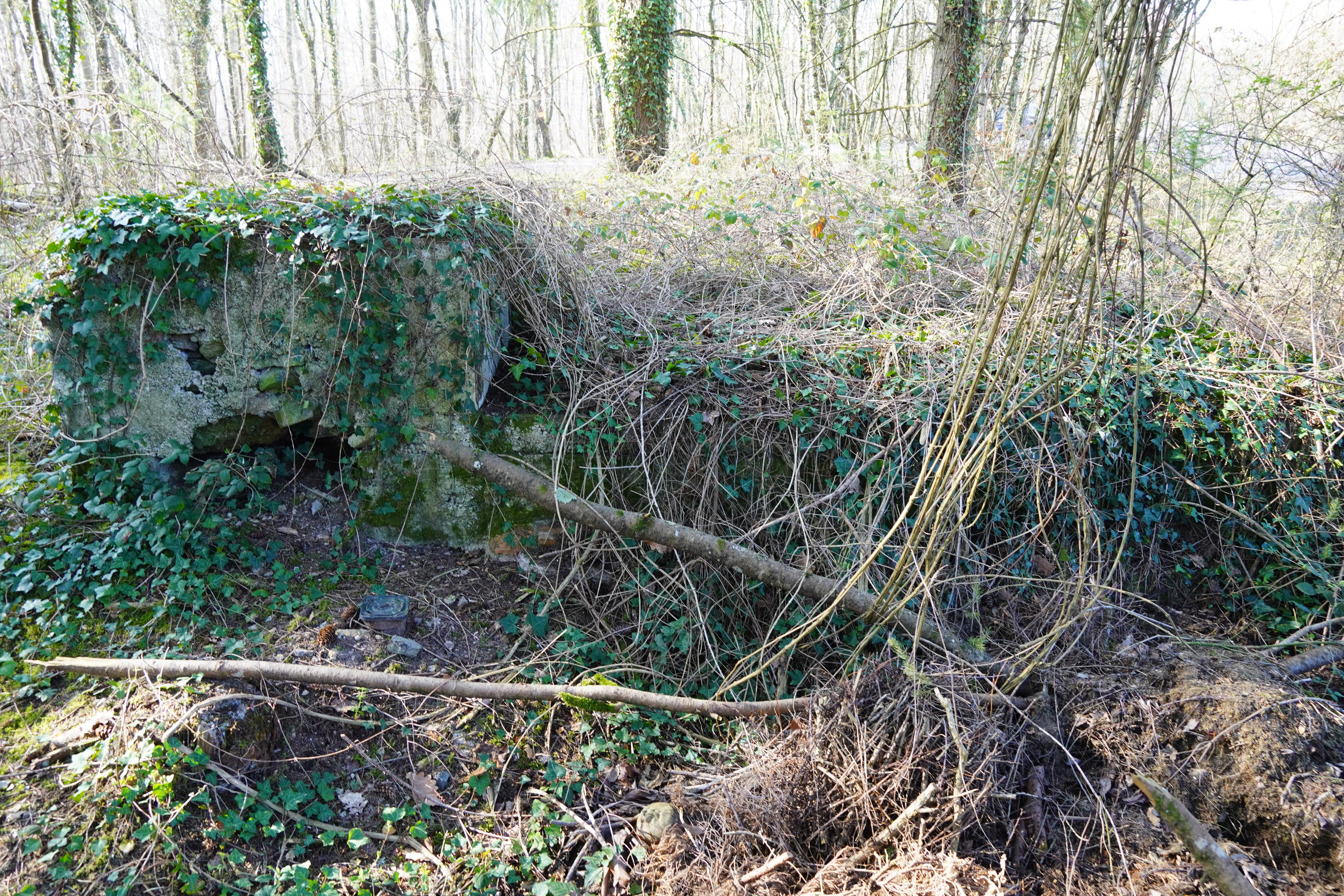
Ruins of the Haute-Meule pithead.

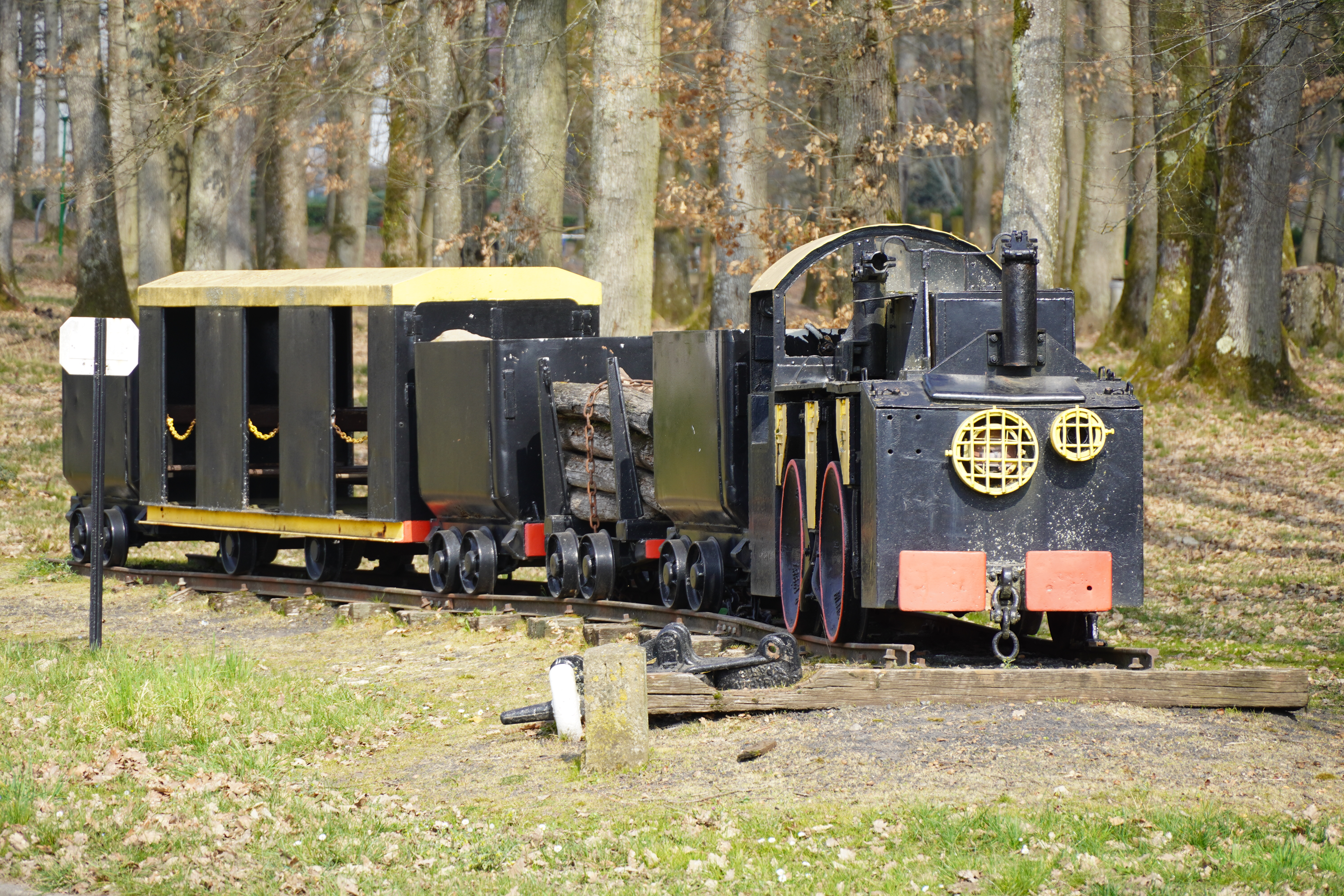
La Machine mining train.

Henri-Paul shaft extraction machine building

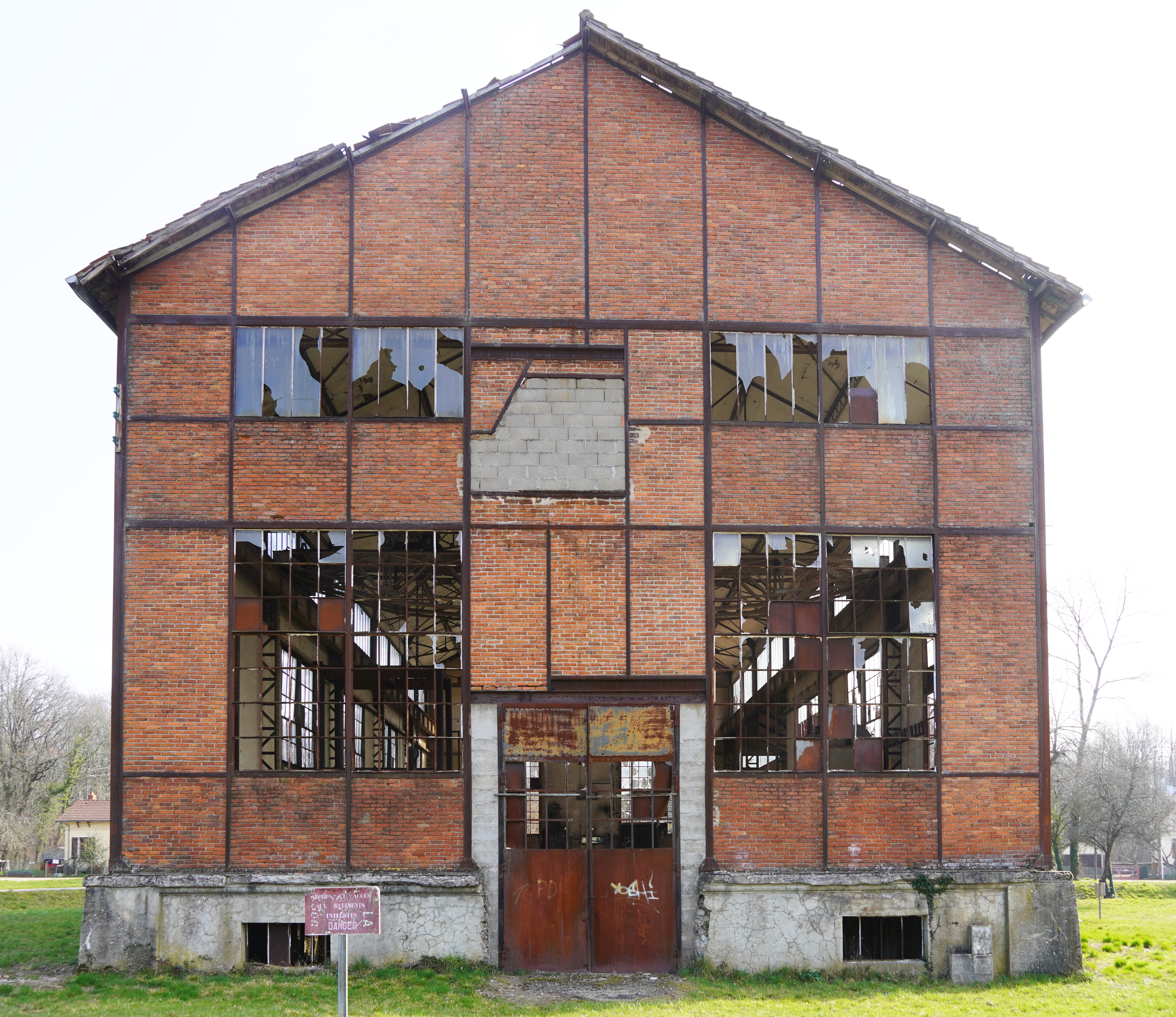
The Henri-Paul shaft extraction machine building (La Machine).

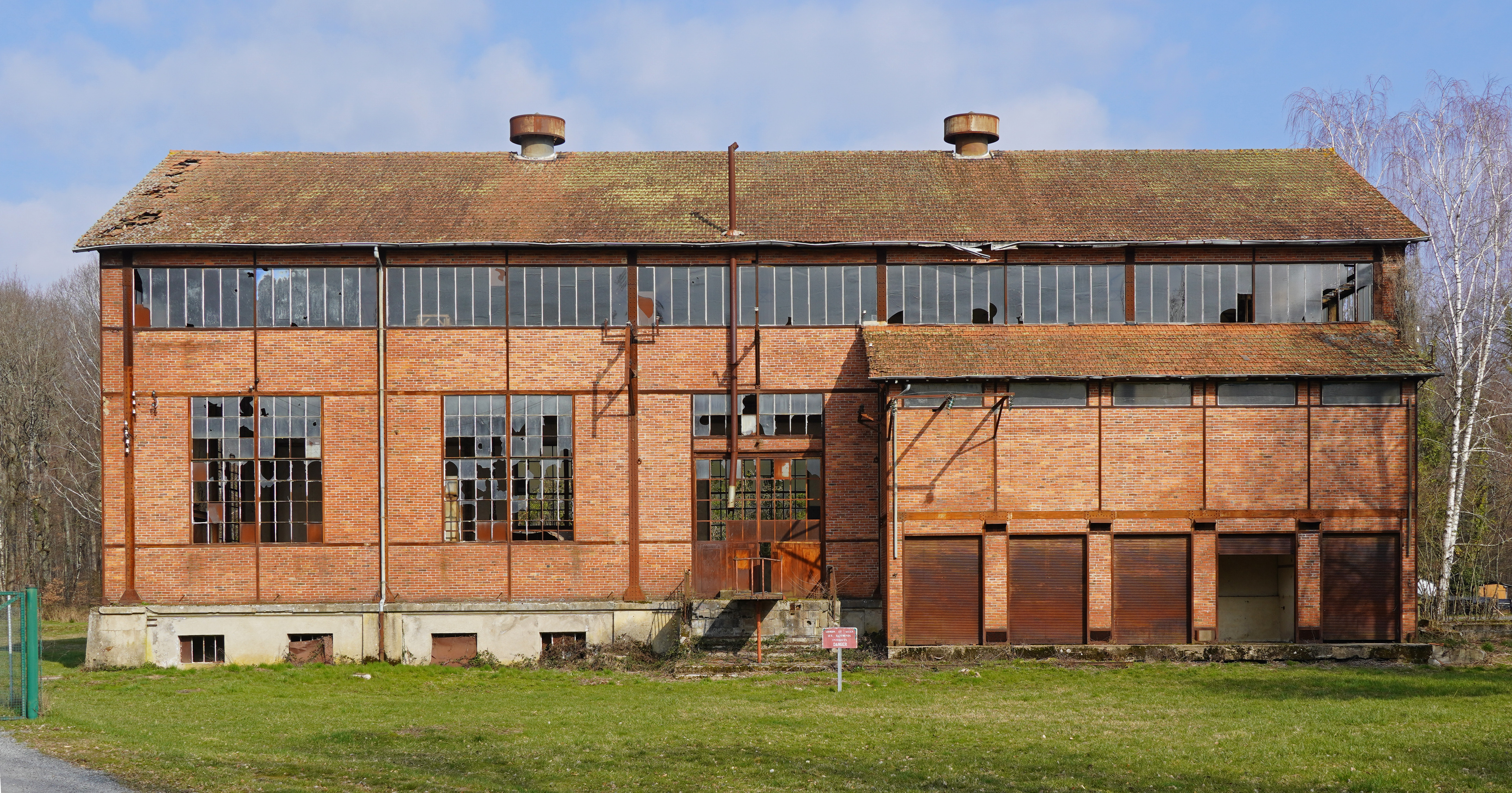
The Henri-Paul shaft extraction machine building (La Machine).

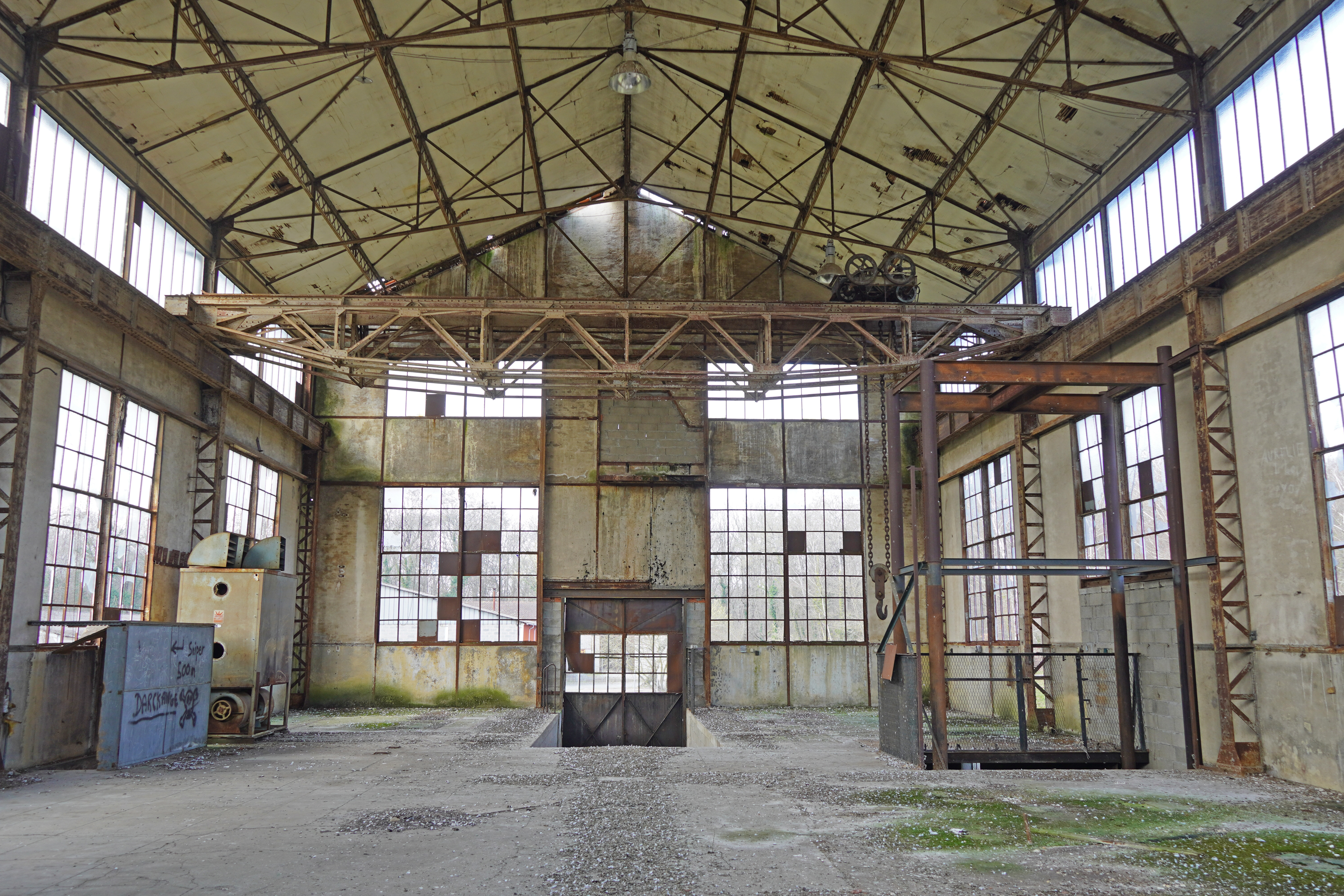
The inside.

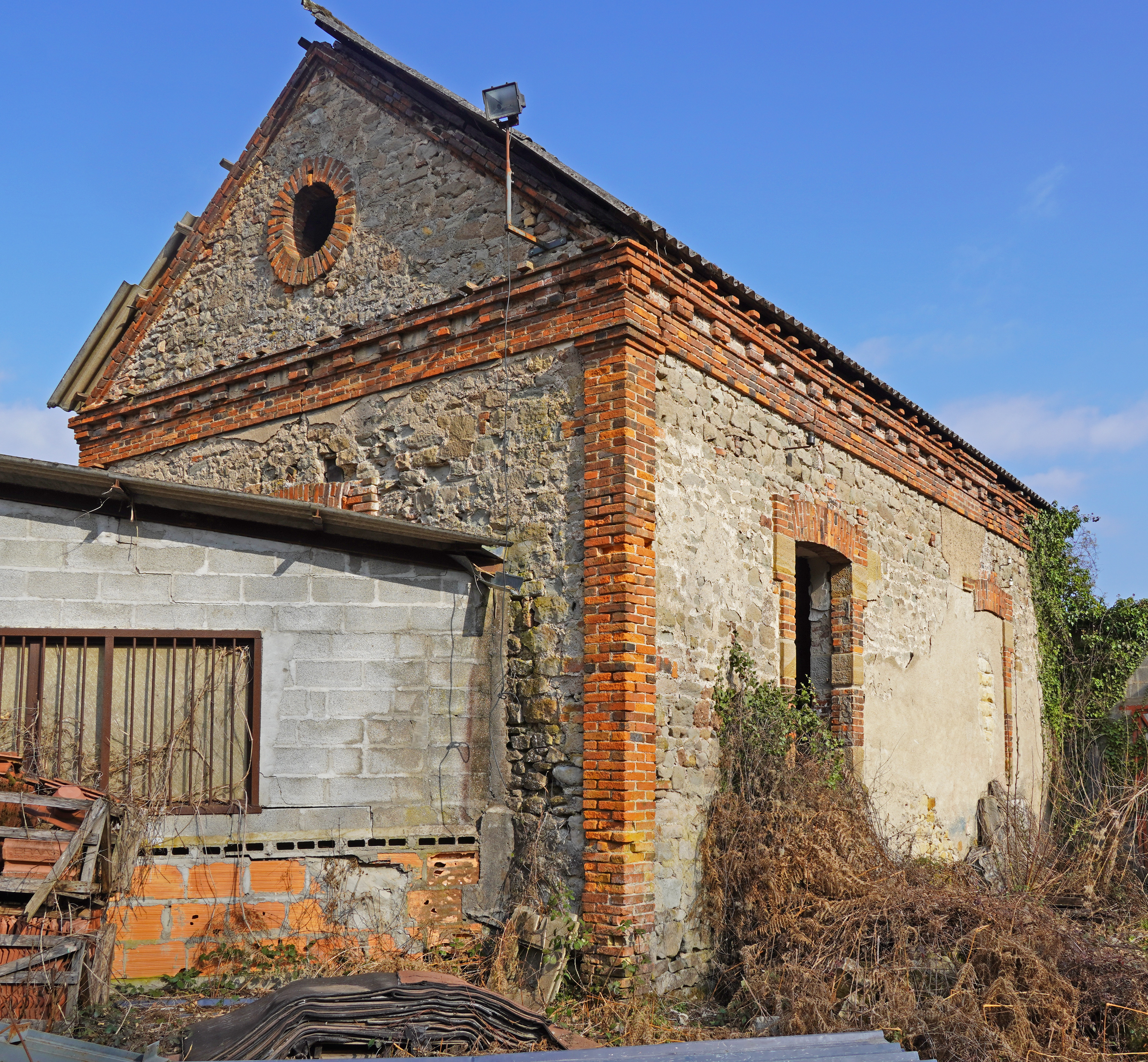
Sainte-Marguerite shaft extraction machine building.

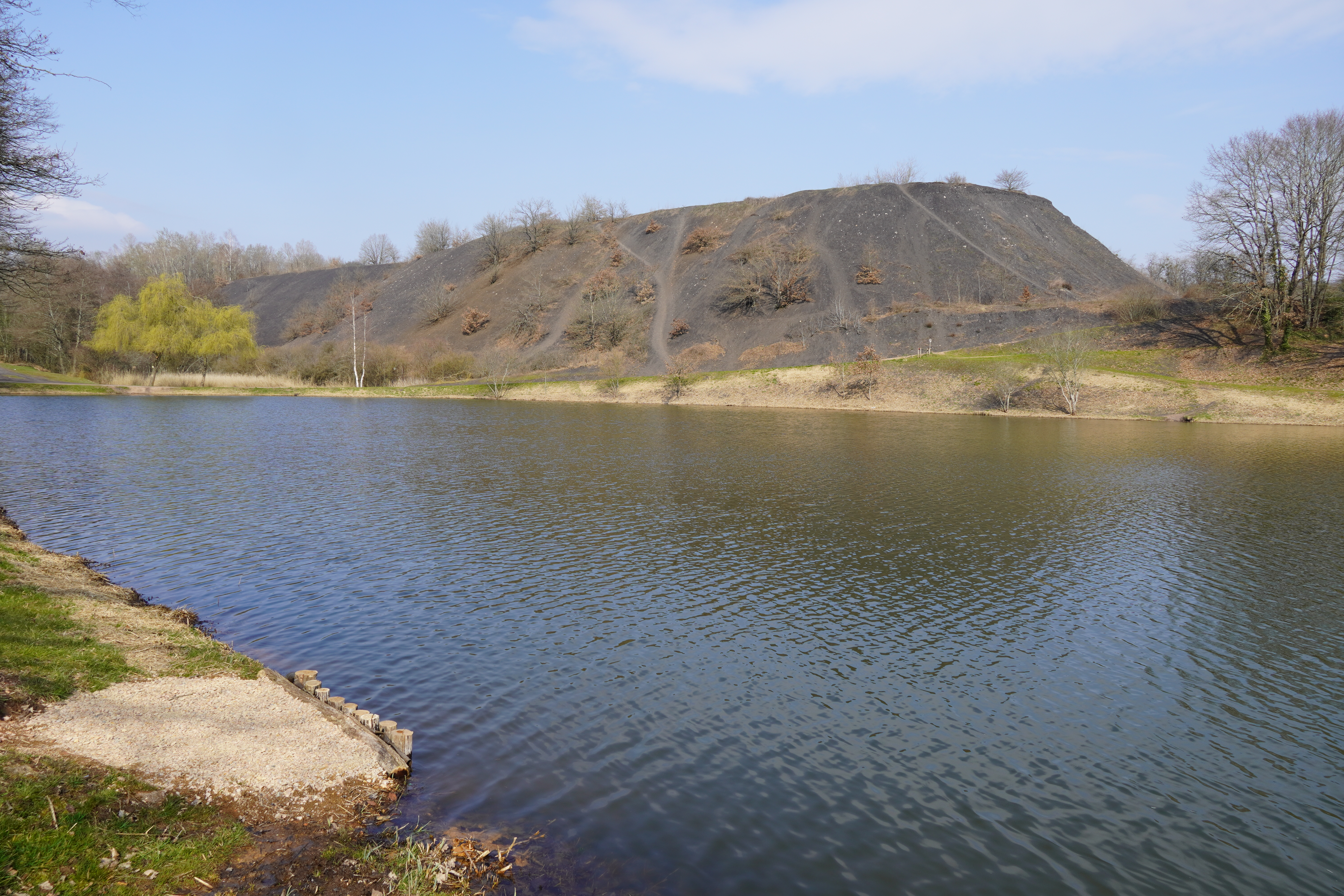
Spoil heap of the Pré Charpin coal wash.

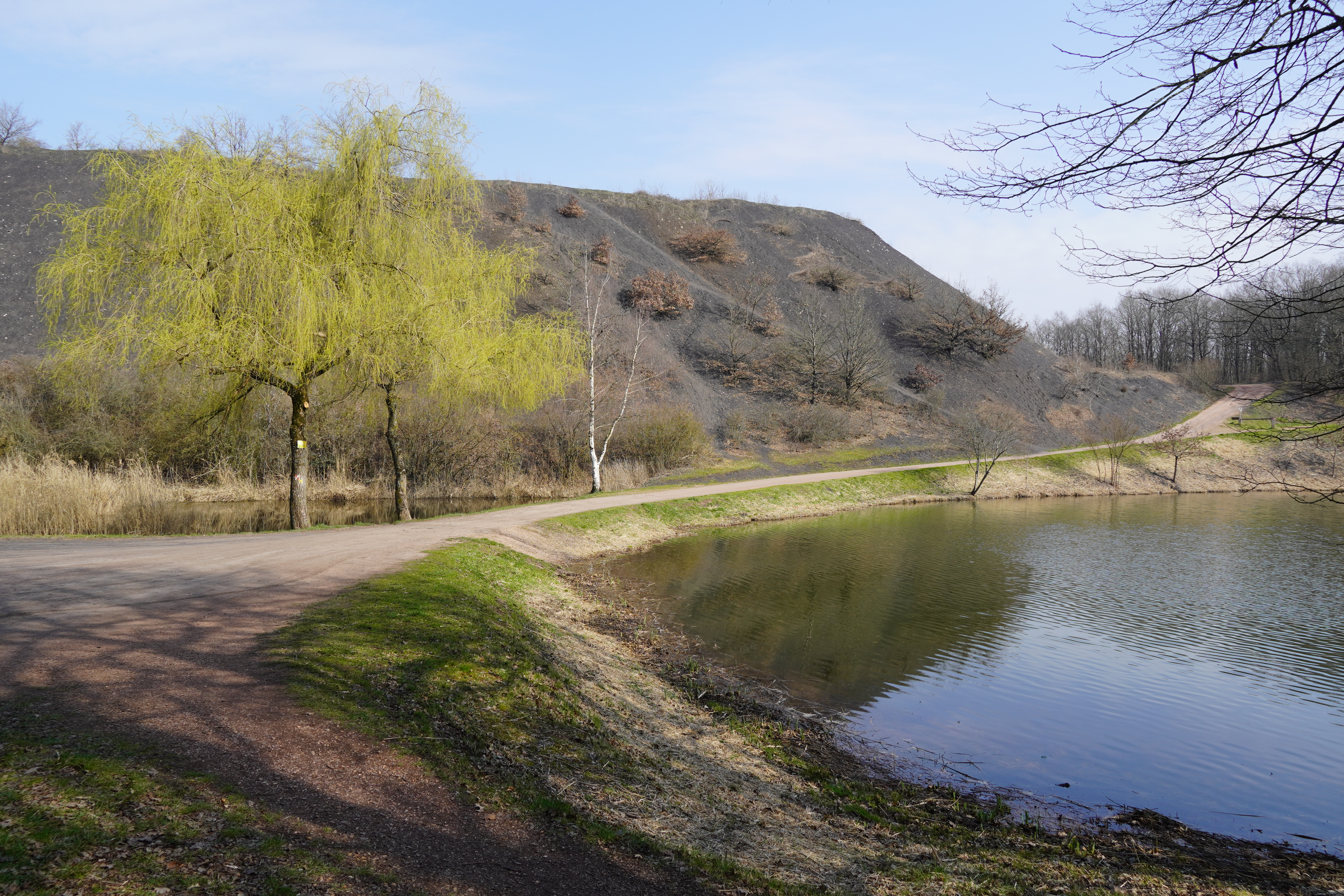
The Pré Charpin coal wash slag heap in La Machine.

The Zagots pithead

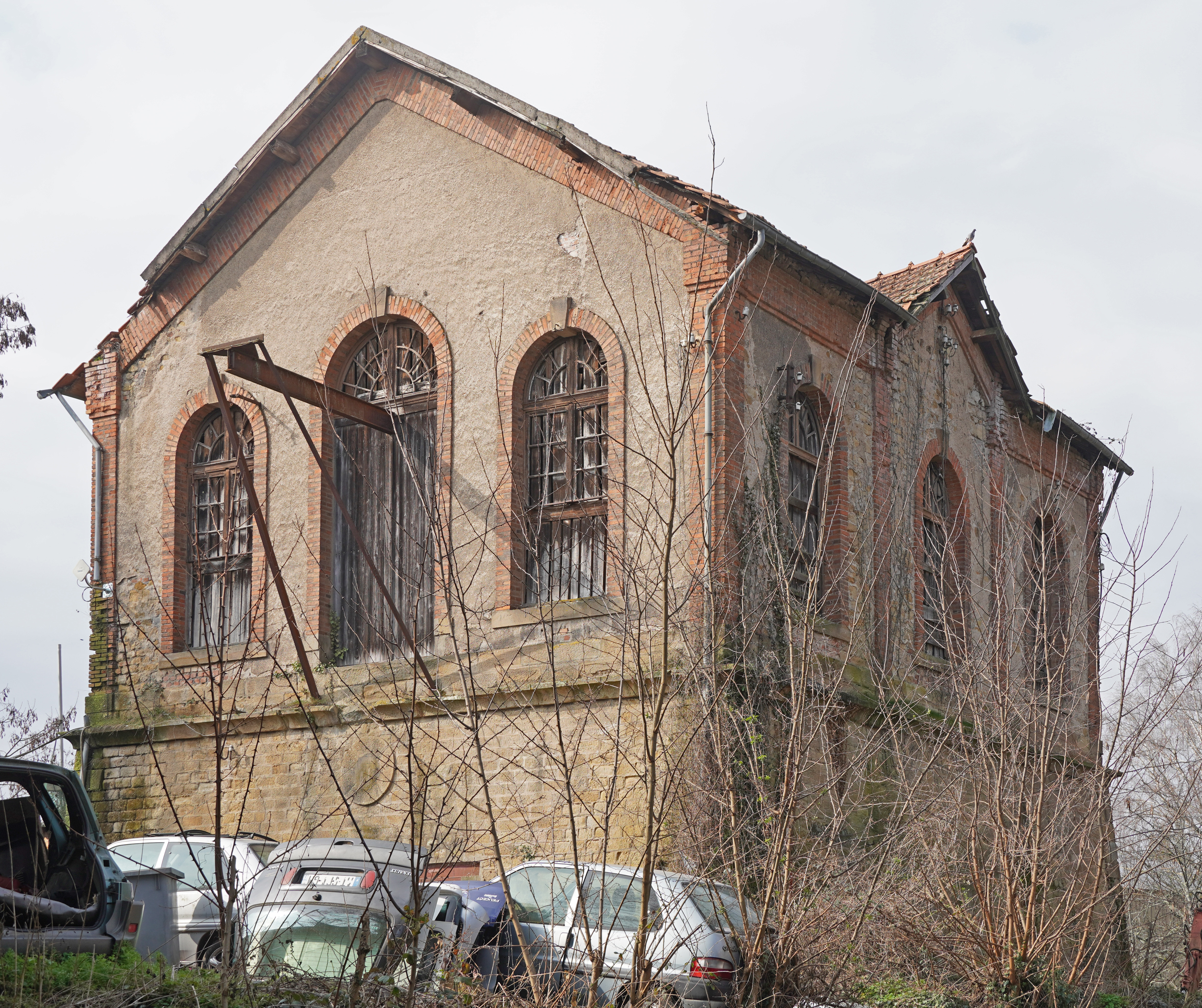
Extraction machine building.

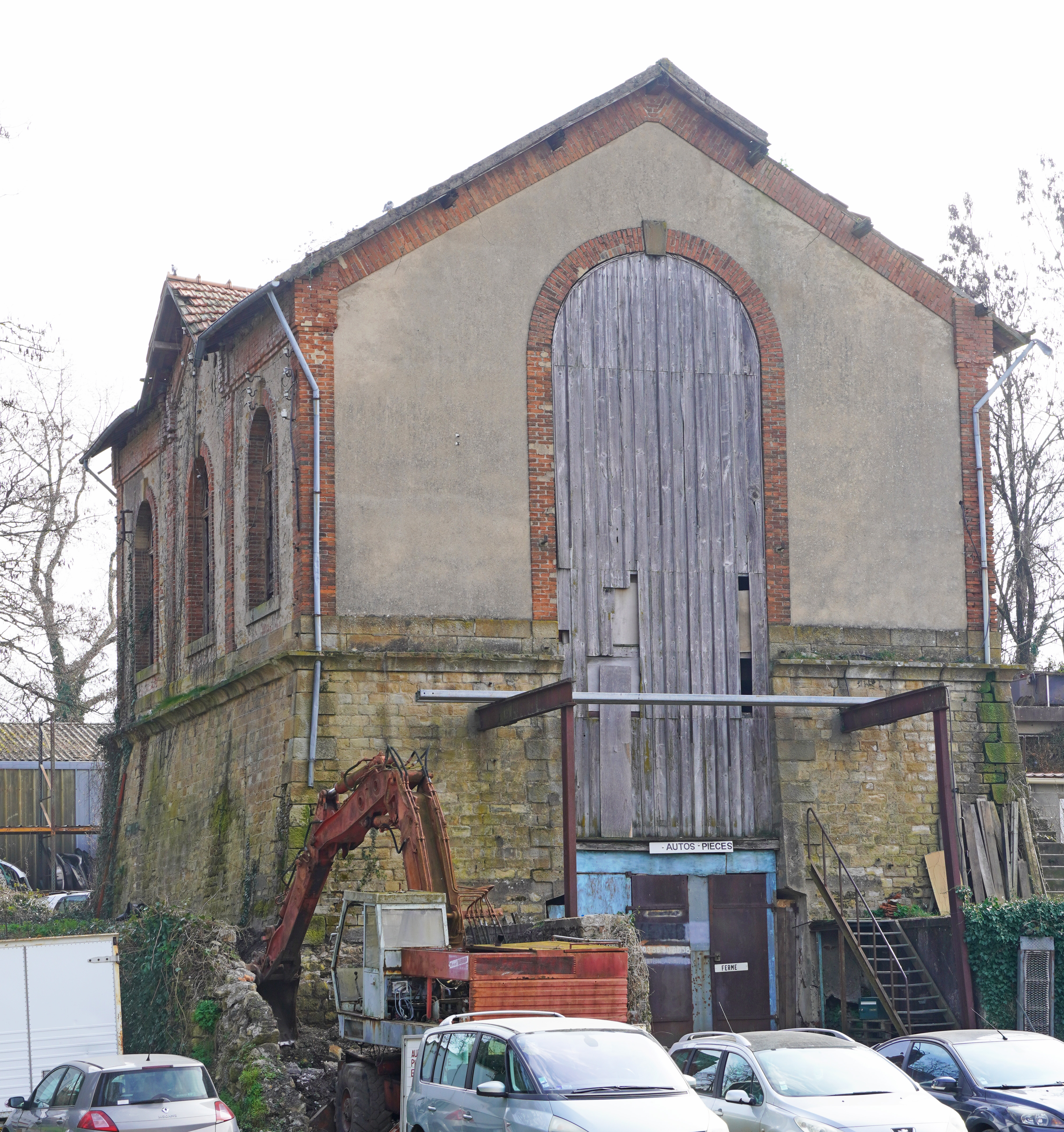
Cable side.

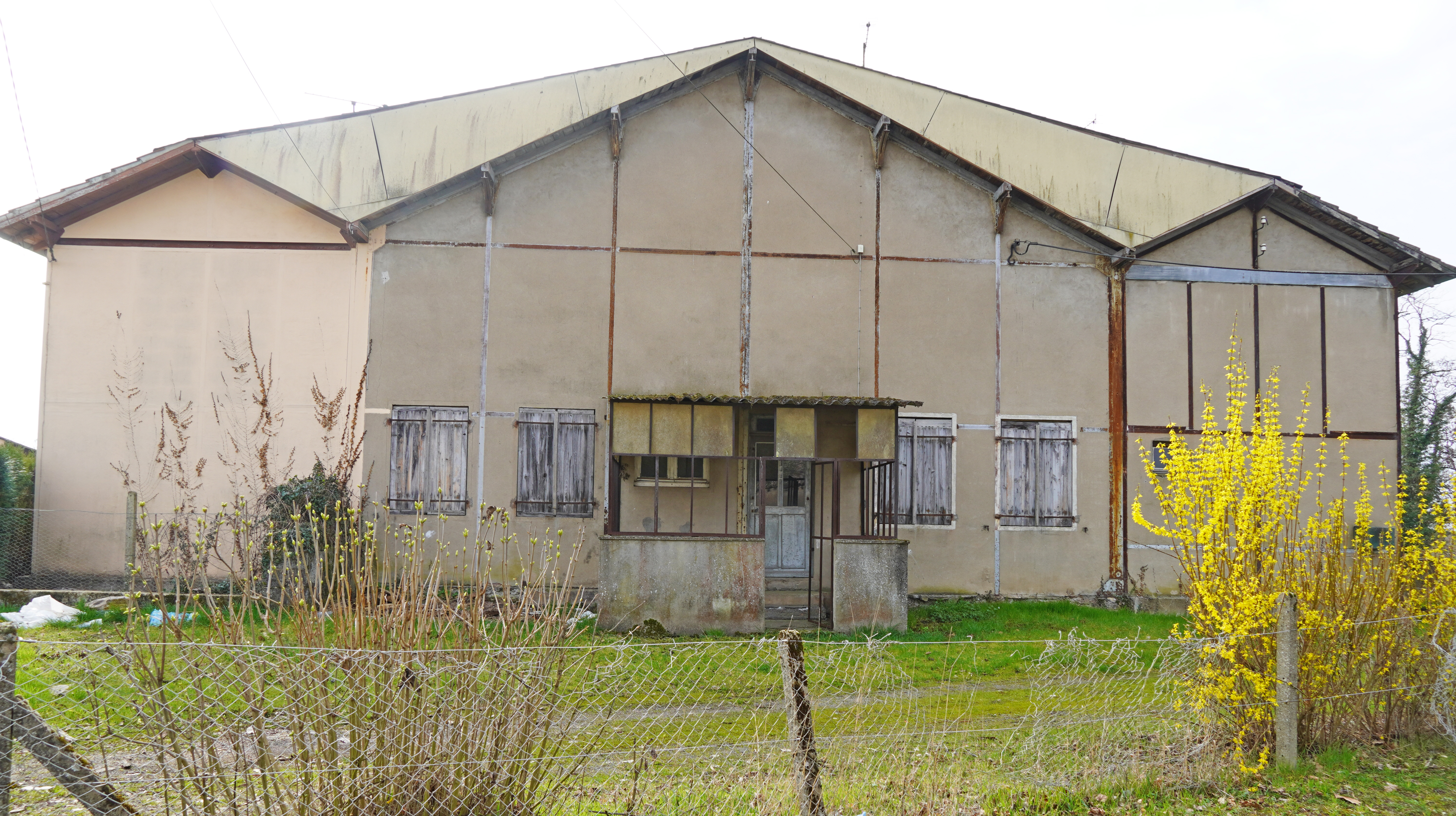
Hall of the hanged (Bath-house and locker room for miners).

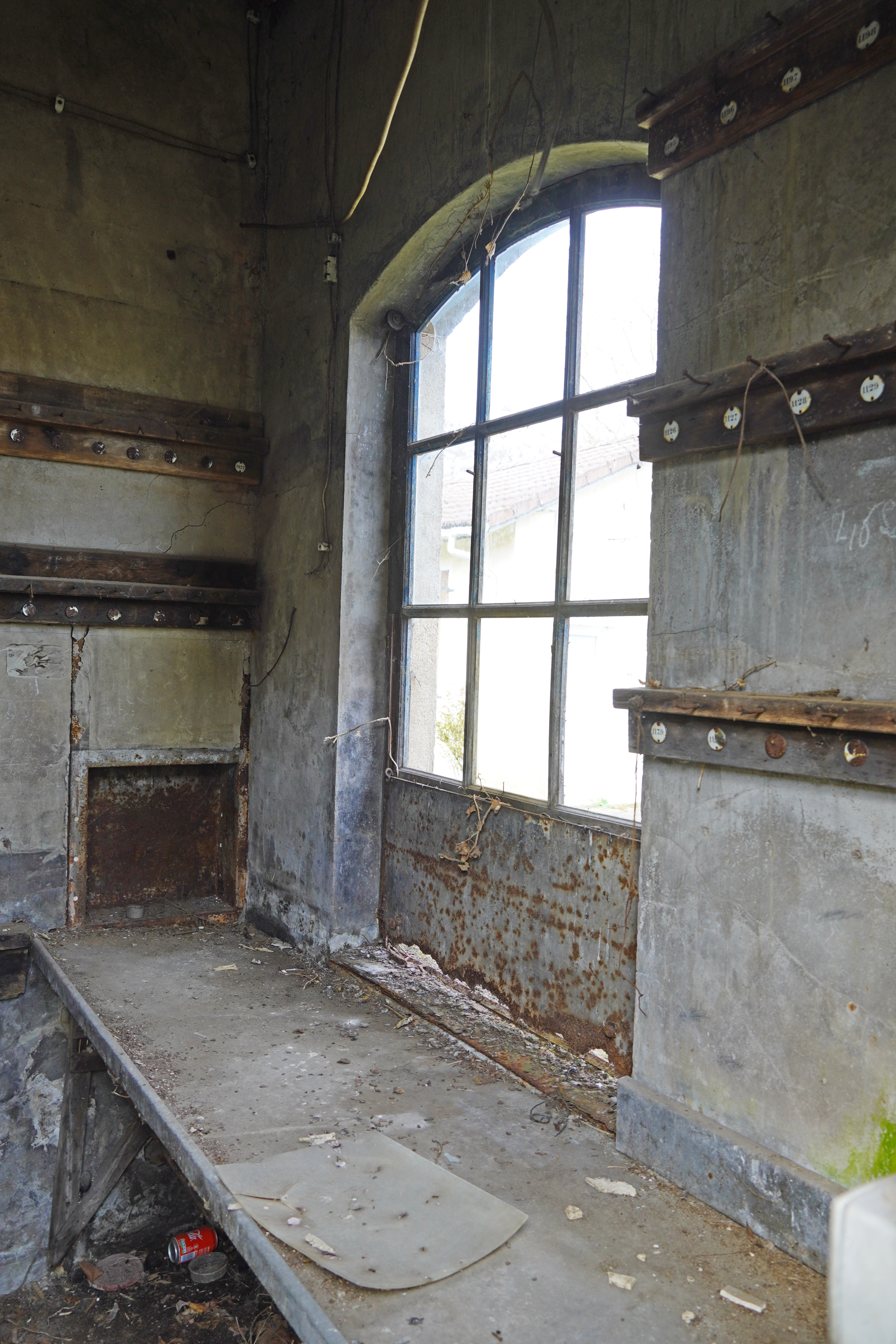
Lamp making.

== See also ==
- Schneider et Cie
- Decize
- La Machine

== Bibliography ==
- Copper-Richer, Diana (2002). Le peuple de la nuit, mines et mineurs en France, XIXe-XXe siècles [The People of the Night, Mines and Miners in France, 19th–20th Centuries] (in French). Paris: Perrin. p. 432. ISBN 978-2-262-01774-3.
- Woronoff, Denis (2003). La France industrielle : gens des ateliers et des usines, 1890-1950 [Industrial France: People of Workshops and Factories, 1890–1950] (in French). Paris: Éditions du Chêne. p. 295. ISBN 978-2-84277-451-6.
- Thuillier, André (1974). Économie et Société nivernaise au début du XIXe siècle [Economy and Society of Nièvre at the Beginning of the 19th Century] (in French). Paris: Mouton. ISBN 978-2-7132-0087-8.
- Volut, Pierre (1999). Decize et son canton au XIXe siècle et à la Belle Époque 1800-1914 [Decize and its Canton in the 19th Century and the Belle Époque 1800–1914] (in French). Decize: Imprimerie Stéphane Legardien. p. 390.
- Poussereau, Louis-Mathieu (1901). Les houillères de La Machine [The La Machine Coal Mines] (in French). Nevers: Self-published. p. 51.
- Chaillet, Carole (1994). La Machine et sa houillère de 1868 à 1914, les premiers temps de la Compagnie Schneider [La Machine and its Coal Mine from 1868 to 1914, the Early Days of the Schneider Company] (in French). Dijon: Université de Bourgogne. p. 97.
- Peycéré, David (1988). Les mineurs étrangers en France entre les deux guerres, l'exemple de La Machine 1913-1940 [Foreign Miners in France between the Wars, the Example of La Machine 1913–1940] (in French). Paris: École des Chartes.
- Collectif (1988). Le temps des cités [The Time of the Workers’ Estates] (in French). Nevers: Self-published. p. 28.
- Collectif (2000). Mémoire de la mine, collection photographique du musée de la mine de La Machine [Memory of the Mine, Photographic Collection of the La Machine Mine Museum] (in French). Nevers: Musées de la Nièvre. p. 85.
