= Courcelles =

Courcelles may refer to:

== Places ==
=== Belgium ===
- Courcelles, Belgium, a municipality located in the province of Hainaut

=== Canada ===
- Courcelles-Saint-Évariste, a municipality

=== France ===
- Courcelles, Charente-Maritime
- Courcelles, Doubs
- Courcelles, Meurthe-et-Moselle
- Courcelles, Nièvre
- Courcelles, Territoire de Belfort
- Courcelles-au-Bois, in the department of Somme
- Courcelles-Chaussy, in the department of Moselle
- Courcelles-de-Touraine, in the department of Indre-et-Loire
- Courcelles-en-Barrois, in the department of Meuse
- Courcelles-en-Bassée, in the department of Seine-et-Marne
- Courcelles-en-Montagne, in the department of Haute-Marne
- Courcelles-Epayelles, in the department of Oise
- Courcelles-Frémoy, in the department of Côte-d'Or
- Courcelles-la-Forêt, in the department of Sarthe
- Courcelles-le-Comte, in the department of Pas-de-Calais
- Courcelles-le-Roi, in the department of Loiret
- Courcelles-lès-Gisors, in the department of Oise
- Courcelles-lès-Lens, in the department of Pas-de-Calais
- Courcelles-lès-Montbard, in the department of Côte-d'Or
- Courcelles-lès-Montbéliard, in the department of Doubs
- Courcelles-lès-Semur, in the department of Côte-d'Or
- Courcelles-Sapicourt, in the department of Marne
- Courcelles-sous-Châtenois, in the department of Vosges
- Courcelles-sous-Moyencourt, in the department of Somme
- Courcelles-sous-Thoix, in the department of Somme
- Courcelles-sur-Aire, in the department of Meuse
- Courcelles-sur-Blaise, in the department of Haute-Marne
- Courcelles-sur-Nied, in the department of Moselle
- Courcelles-sur-Seine, in the department of Eure
- Courcelles-sur-Vesles, in the department of Aisne
- Courcelles-sur-Viosne, in the department of Val-d'Oise
- Courcelles-sur-Voire, in the department of Aube
- Courcelles station, a Paris Metro station

== Family name ==
- Anne-Thérèse de Marguenat de Courcelles
- Daniel de Rémy de Courcelle (or Courcelles), French governor of Canada (1665-1672)
- Didier de Chaffoy de Courcelles
- Étienne de Courcelles
- Gérard de Courcelles
- Johann Gabriel Chasteler de Courcelles

== See also ==
- Corcelles (disambiguation)
