= Sincey coal mines =

Anthracite mine located in Sincey-lès-Rouvray, France

Coordinates: 47°25′52″N 4°07′54″E

Location of the deposit on the map of French coal basins.

The Sincey coal mines were anthracite mines operating between 1835 and 1908 in Sincey-lès-Rouvray and neighboring communes in the western Côte-d'Or region.

The deposit was discovered by Count Champion de Nansouty in 1835. After experiencing competition from Baronne de Candras, the two rivals' wells closed before 1842, and only the outcrops remained exploited. After 1860, activity was revived by Eugène Soyez, founder of the Compagnie des mines de l'Escarpelle in the Nord-Pas-de-Calais mining basin. The Soyez de Sincey shaft (which bears his name) was sunk in 1862 and operated industrially from 1876 to 1908. Maximum production in the coalfield was 12,000 tons a year, and total production amounted to 225,000 tons.

At the beginning of the 21st century, a few ruins remain in the vegetation, as well as a few “corons”.

== Location ==
Extent of the coal basin in the Côte-d'Or department.

Map of coal concessions in Burgundy: 1. Sincey-lès-Rouvray; 2. Polroy; 3. Chambois; 4. Concessions in the Épinac basin; 5. Aubigny-la-Ronce; 6. Decize; 7. Verneuil; 8. Le Creusot (Blanzy basin); 9. Other concessions in the Blanzy basin including Montchanin and Longpendu; 10. La Dheune; 11. Vellerot; 12. Forges; 13. Les Petits Châteaux; 14. Pully; 15. Grandchamp; 16. St-Laurent en Brionnais; 17. Les Moquets; 18. La Chapelle-sous-Dun; 19. Montreuillon, Montigny en Morvan and Blismes; 20. Menessaire; 21. Reclesmes; 22. Uxeau and Toulon-sur-Arroux.

The concession granted on July 31, 1867, covers the municipalities of Sincey-lès-Rouvray, Sainte-Magnance, Vieux-Château, Montberthault, Montigny-Saint-Barthélemy, Thoste, Courcelles-Frémoy and Courcelles-lès-Semur. The deposit lies in the western part of the Côte-d'Or département, and extends into the Yonne, in the Bourgogne-Franche-Comté region.

== Geology ==
The anthracite extracted produces almost no ash but is difficult to ignite and cannot be coked because it is not sufficiently greasy. Six particularly inclined layers are mined. This coal has proved ineffective for heating the Semur-en-Auxois prison or for smelting iron ore in the Toutry blast furnaces. However, it is used in villages around Sincey-lès-Rouvray and lime kilns in the Armançon valley.

== History ==
At the beginning of the 19th century, iron was mined in Côte-d'Or, and the ore was used in local forges, but local forge masters preferred charcoal to coal for smelting iron, which explains why there was no search for a charcoal deposit until the 1830s; apart from some excavations in the vicinity of Sombernon during the French Revolution.

At the instigation of Count Champion de Nansouty, coal outcrops were discovered at Sincey-lès-Rouvray in 1835, enabling a concession application to be launched. Further prospecting was undertaken by the Count, who teamed up with an external student engineer from the École des Mines de Paris, an English worker, and a German miner. Several miners from the Saône-et-Loire coal mines were recruited to carry out the work.

After a visit by the prefect in 1838, the mining administration provided the research company with a more efficient drilling rig. However, the mining projects were contested by forest owners who feared competition for wood and charcoal from their forests. In protest, the Baroness de Candras dug her shaft close to the work of Count Champion de Nansouty, who had two shafts linked by a main gallery. Eventually, however, the two protagonists ran out of resources and the last of the work ceased in 1842. The outcrops continued to supply the Velars-sur-Ouche plant and lime kilns in the 1850s.

After 1860, activity was revived by Eugène Soyez, founder of the Compagnie des mines de l'Escarpelle in the Nord-Pas-de-Calais mining basin. The Soyez de Sincey shaft (named after the new concessionaire) was sunk in 1862 and operated industrially from 1876 to 1908. Maximum production was 12,000 tons a year with 120 workers in 1875, and total production from the deposit was 225,000 tons.

The Soyez well, last to close.
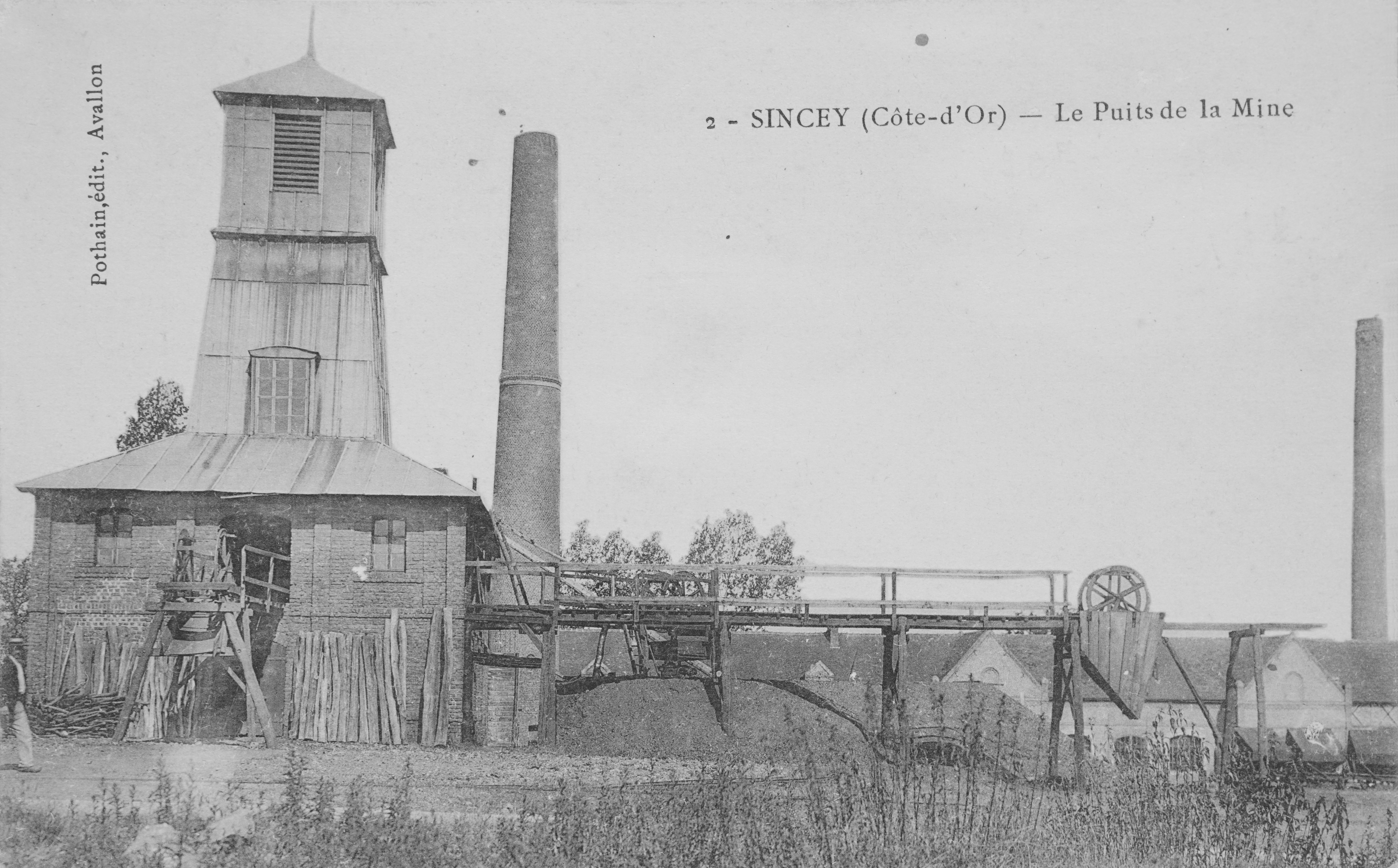
The Sincey-lès-Rouvray coal mine shaft.

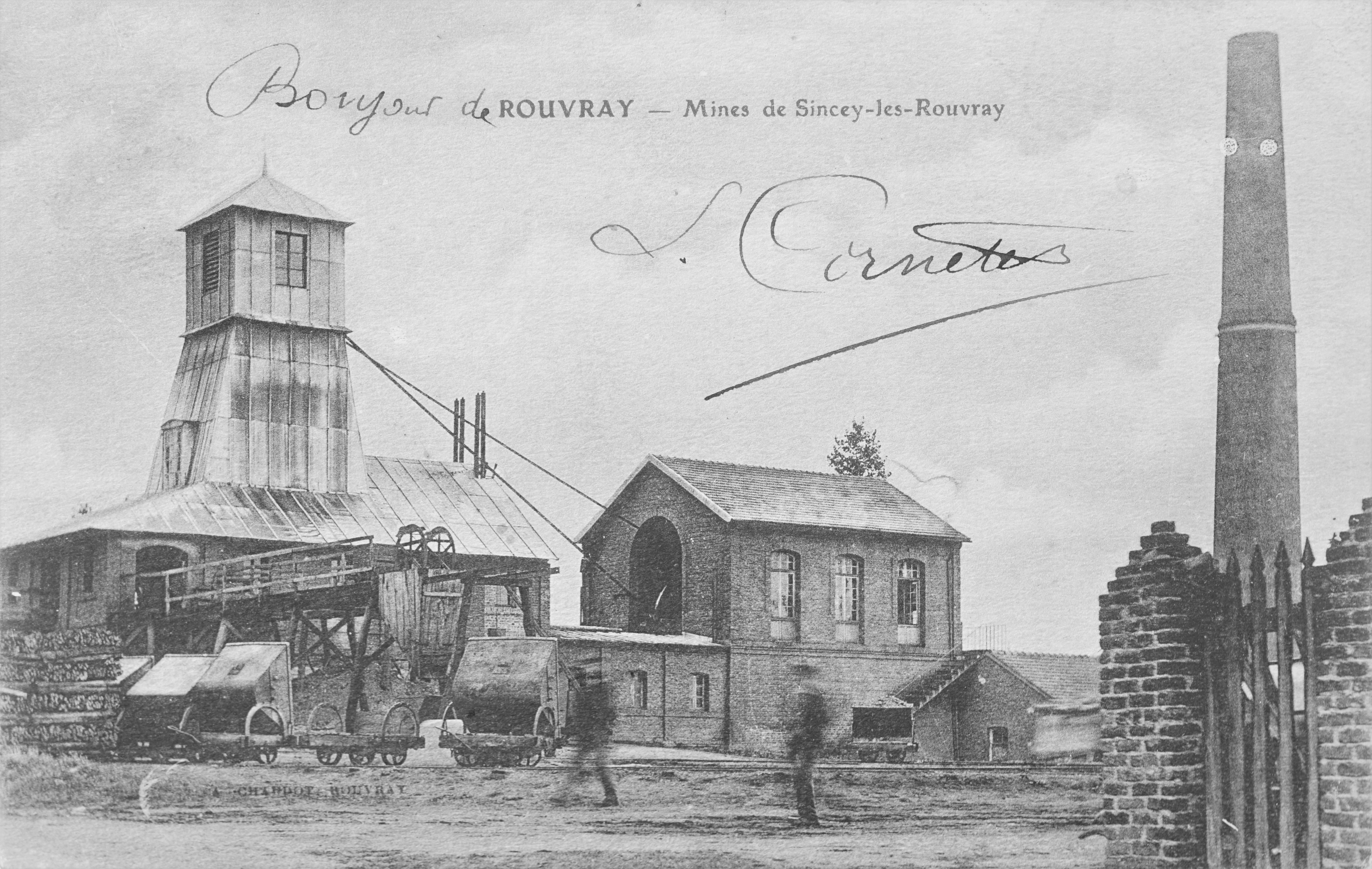
The Soyez well in Sincey-lès-Rouvray.

== Well ==
List of wells that have been in operation
Building	Name	Depth	Activity	Function
1835	well nº 1	63m	~1836 – 1840	mining
1835	well nº 2 / wood	62m	~1836 – 1840	mining
1838	Mrs. de Candras' well	60m	1838 – 1842	mining
?	Thoste well	20m	? – 1840	research
?	Ruffey wood well	35/40m	? – 1840	mining
?	Sainte-Barbe well	?	?	mining
?	Coast well	?	?	mining
?	Charmois well	?	?	mining
?	Sainte-Magnance well	?	?	mining
1862	Soyez de Sincey well	210m	1873 – 1908	mining
1873	Villiers-Nonains well	>30m	?	research

== Transport ==
Coal was transported to the town of Montbard via the Burgundy canal, then by rail from 1881 onwards, the Sincey-lès-Rouvray station being on the line from Cravant - Bazarnes to Dracy-Saint-Loup.

== After the mine ==
After the closure of the Sincey Soyez pit, the buildings, machinery, and equipment were left as they were, in the event of a resumption of activity. During the Occupation, the equipment was transferred to the Télots mine, but the buildings and shaft were left intact.

In the early 1980s, the Charmois and Sainte-Barbe shafts were backfilled, and the materials from their spoil heaps were recycled in a cement plant. The installations at the Soyez de Sincey pit were demolished and the pit was backfilled in 1997. At the beginning of the 21st century, a few ruins remain in the vegetation and some forty “coron” dwellings.

Remains of the wells
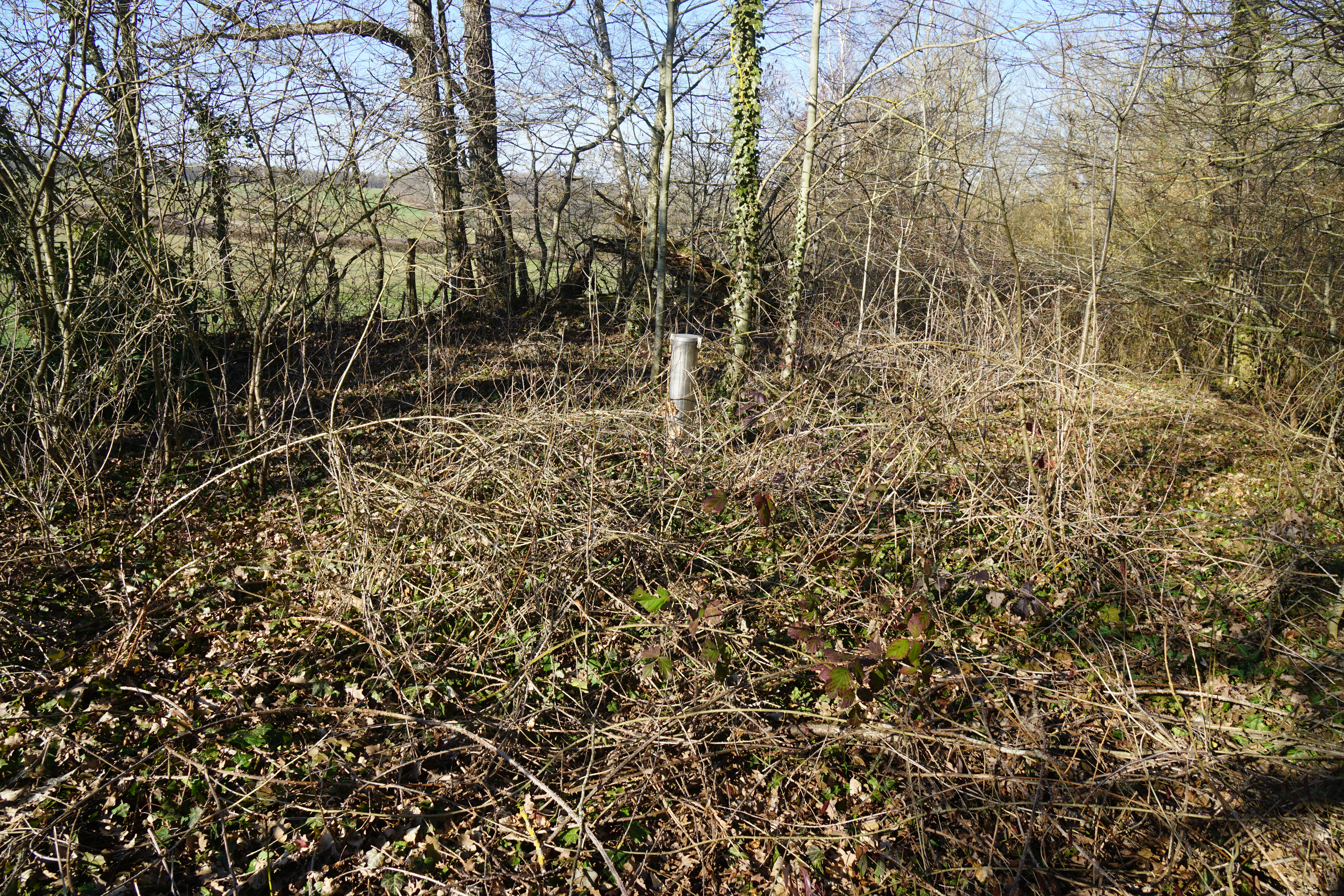
Location of the Eugène Soyez well with a piezometer.

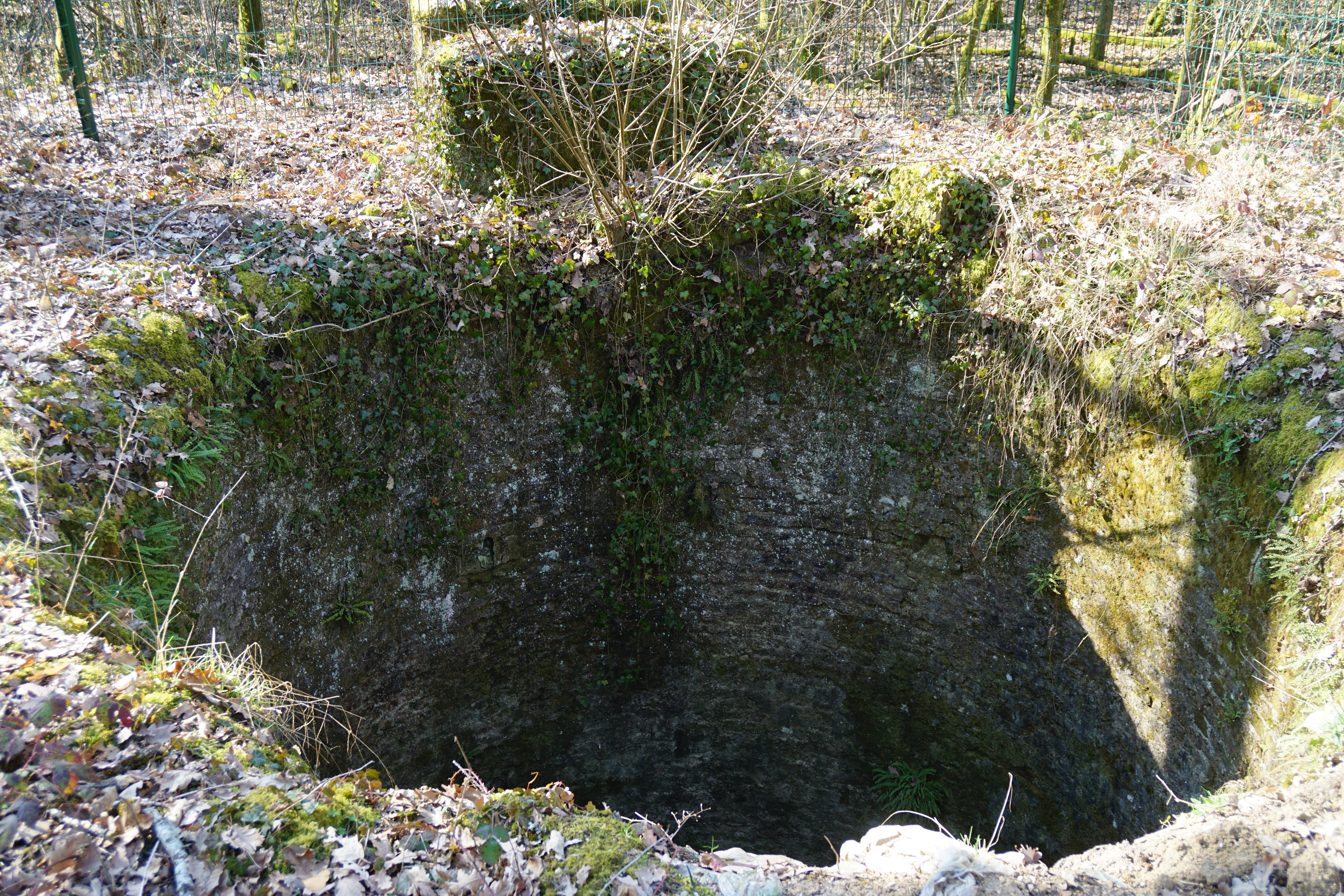
The opening of the Sainte-Magnance well.

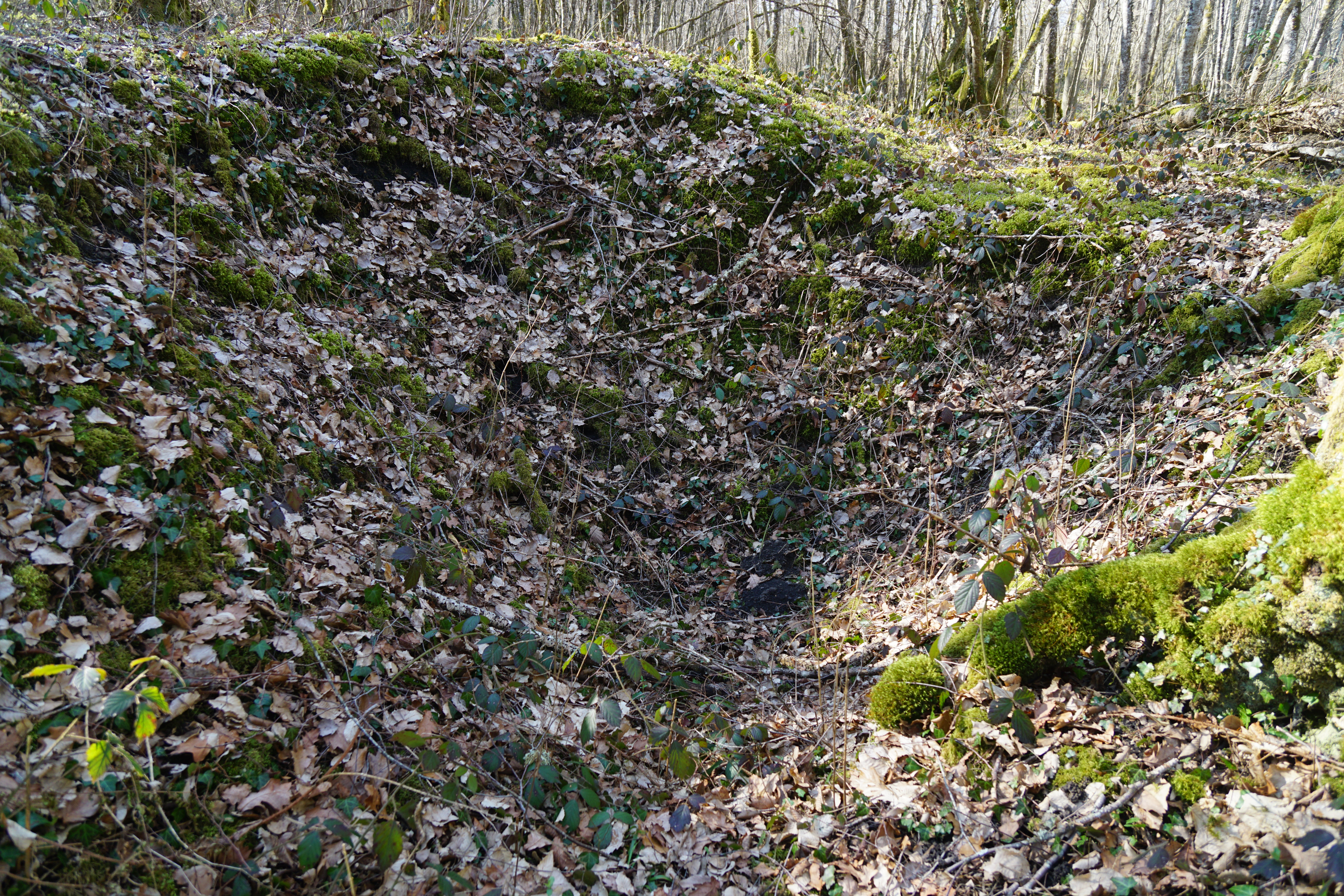
The funnel formed by the settling of the Charmée well.

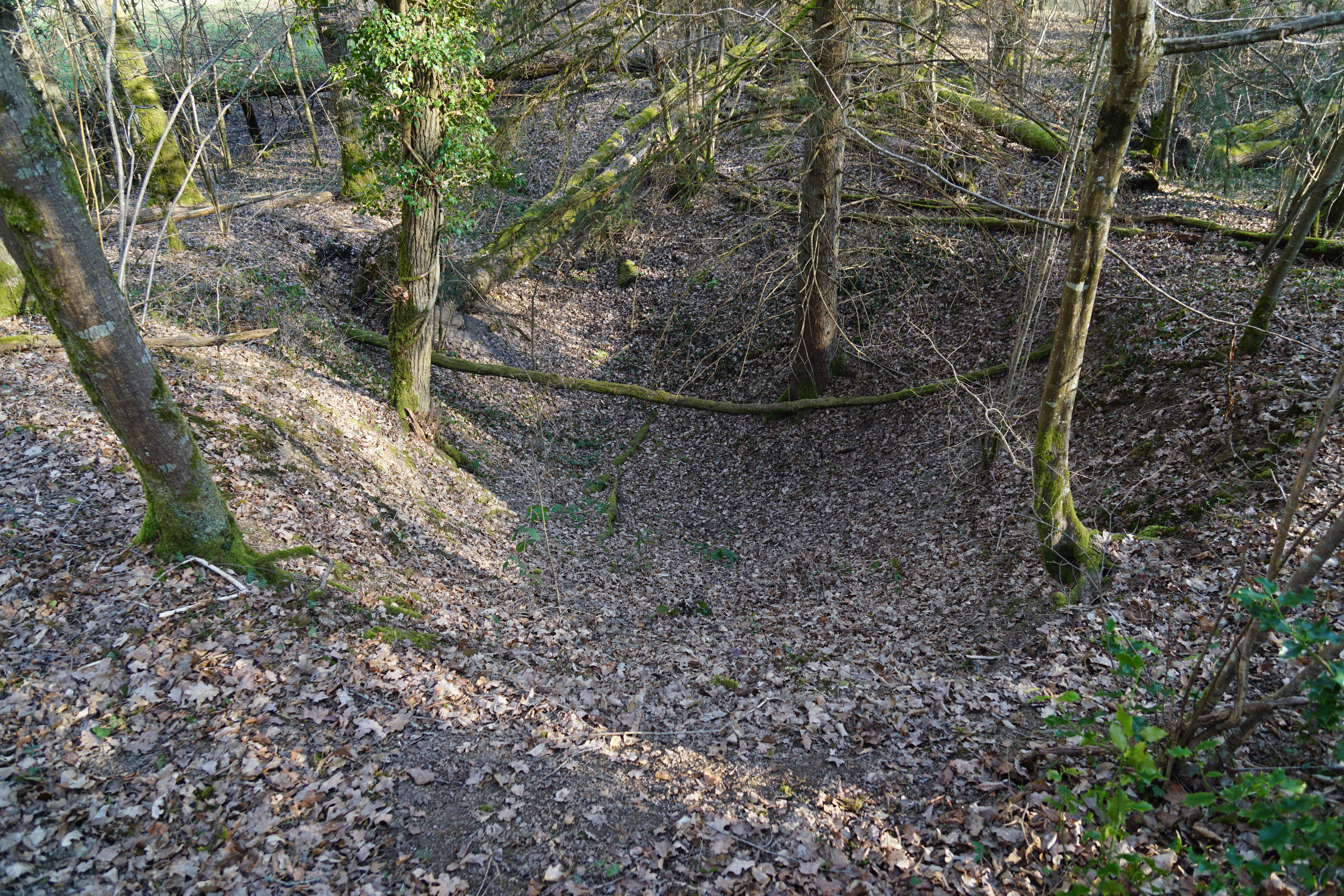
Well located in Courcelles.

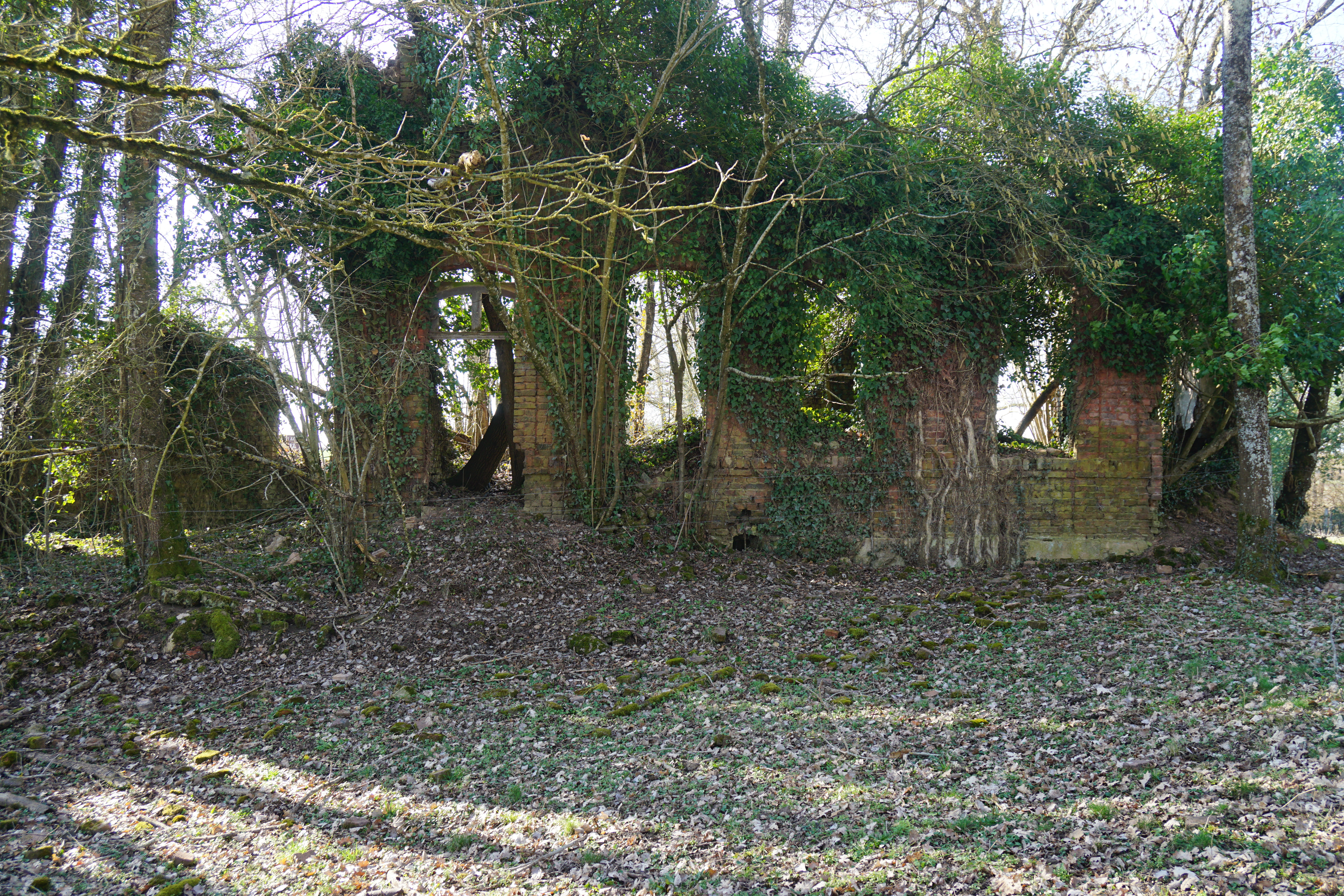
Ruin of the director's house.

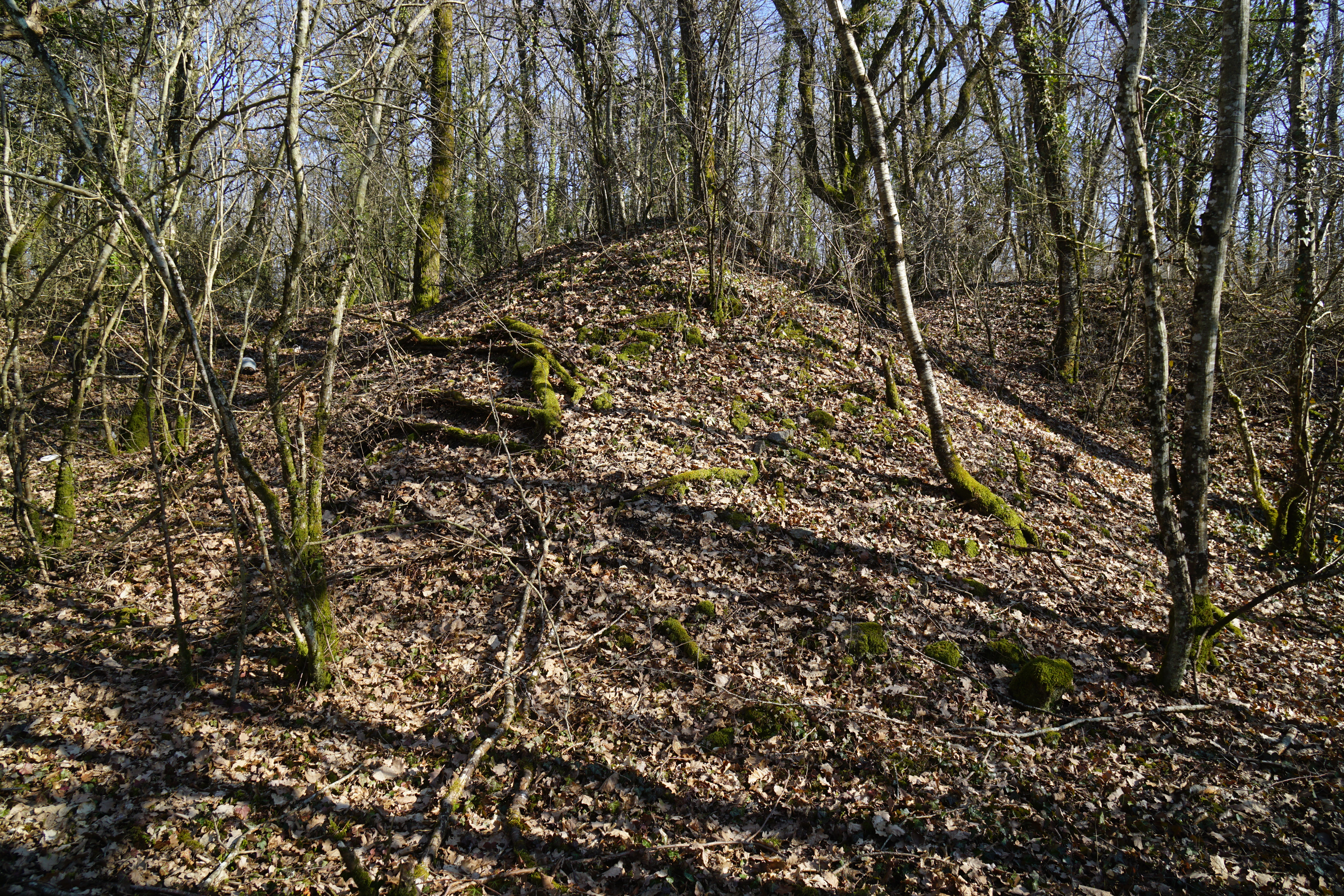
Le terril du puits Sainte-Magnance.

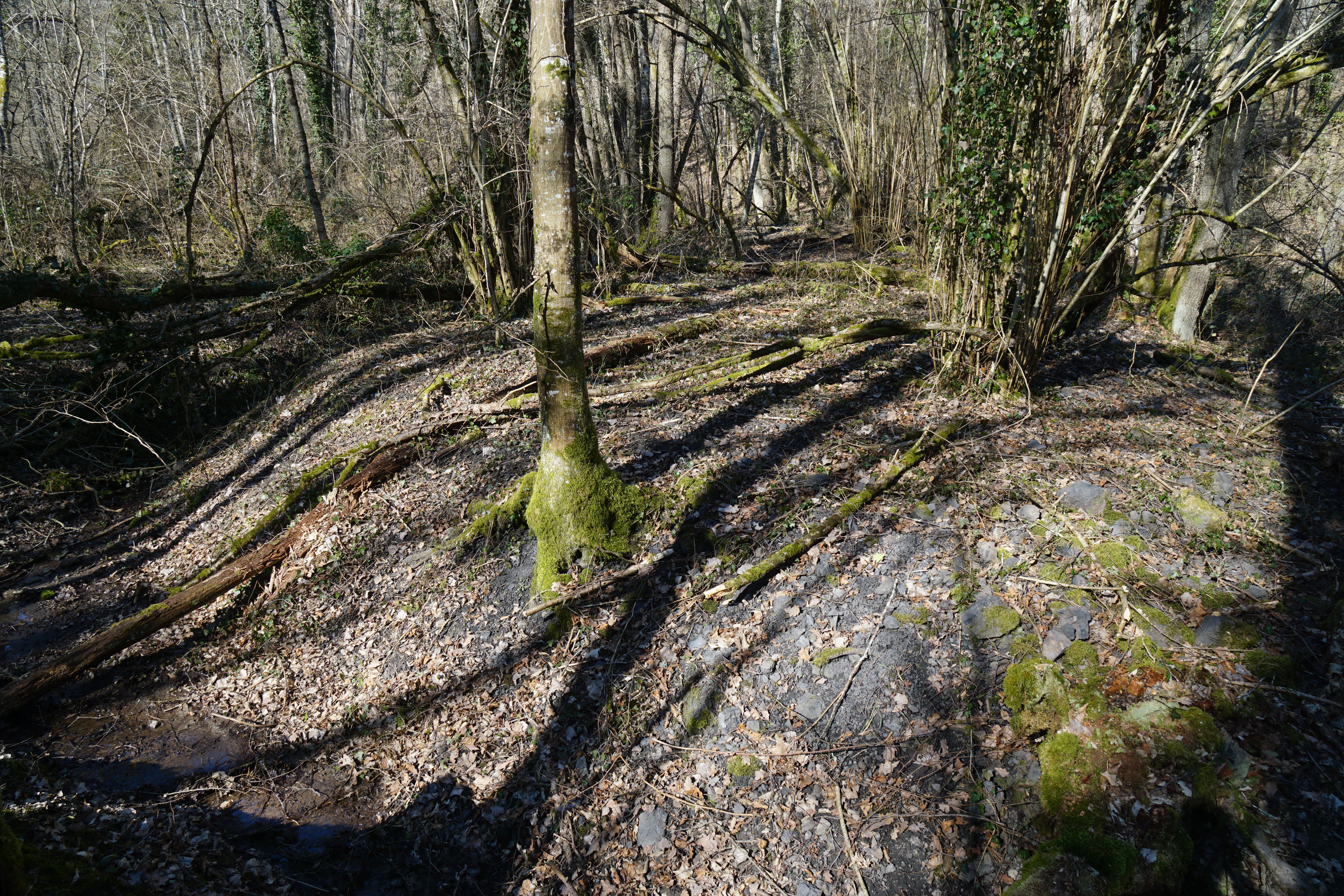
The spoil heap of the Charmée well.

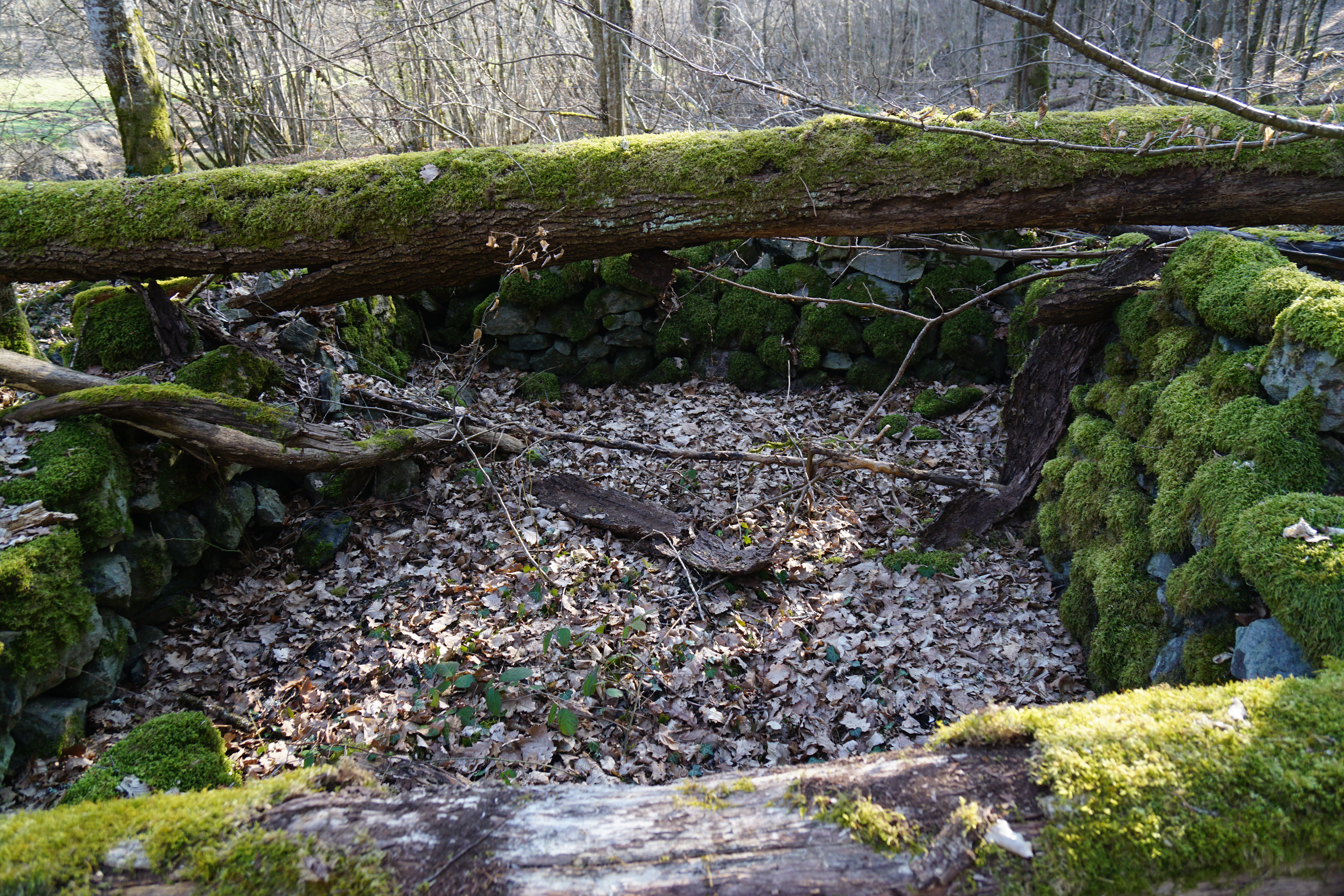
Ruin of a well building located in Courcelles.

== See also ==
- Sincey-lès-Rouvray
- Côte-d'Or
- Decize coal mine

== Bibliography ==
- France Conseil des Mines (1852). Annales des mines: ou recueil de mémoires sur l'exploitation des mines et sur les sciences et les arts qui s'y rapportent [Annals of Mines: or collection of memoirs on the exploitation of mines and on the sciences and arts relating thereto] (in French). Carilian-Goeury et Dalmont. p. 127-167.
- Passaqui, Jean-Philippe (2001). Mines et minières de Côte-d'Or au XIXe siècle [Mines and mining of Côte-d'Or in the 19th century] (PDF) (in French). p. 390-396.
