= Champdor-Corcelles =

Commune in Auvergne-Rhône-Alpes, France

- Commune
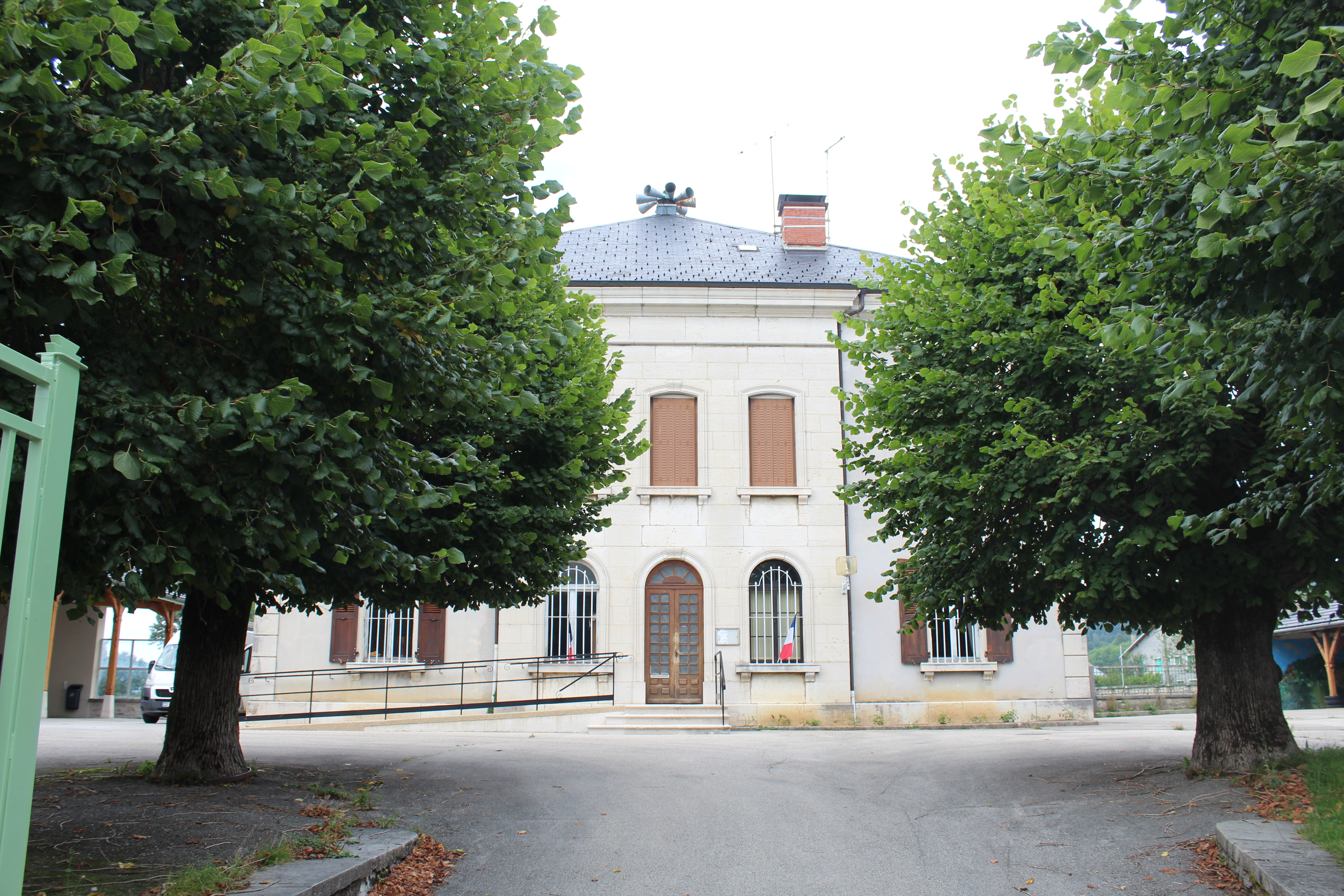
- Town hall

- Coat of arms
- Location of Champdor-Corcelles
- Location within France Location within Auvergne-Rhône-Alpes
- Coordinates: 46°01′01″N 5°35′49″E
- Country: France
- Region: Auvergne-Rhône-Alpes
- Department: Ain
- Arrondissement: Belley
- Canton: Plateau d'Hauteville
- Intercommunality: Haut-Bugey Agglomération

Government
  - Mayor (2026–32): Stéphane Martinand
- Area^{1}: 31.53 km^{2} (12.17 sq mi)
- Population (2023): 665
  - Density: 21.1/km^{2} (54.6/sq mi)
- Time zone: UTC+01:00 (CET)
  - Summer (DST): UTC+02:00 (CEST)
- INSEE/Postal code: 01080 /01110
- ^{1} French Land Register data, which excludes lakes, ponds, glaciers > 1 km^{2} (0.386 sq mi or 247 acres) and river estuaries.

Champdor-Corcelles (French pronunciation: [ʃɑ̃dɔʁ kɔʁsɛl]) is a commune in the Ain department of eastern France. The municipality was established on 1 January 2016 and consists of the former communes of Champdor and Corcelles.

== See also ==
- Communes of the Ain department
