= Corcelles =

Corcelles is the name or part of the name of several places:

== Switzerland ==
- Corcelles, Bern, in the canton of Bern
- Corcelles-Cormondrèche, in the canton of Neuchâtel
- Corcelles-le-Jorat, in the canton of Vaud
- Corcelles-près-Concise, in the canton of Vaud
- Corcelles-près-Payerne, in the canton of Vaud
- Corcelles-sur-Chavornay, in the canton of Vaud

== France ==
- Corcelles, Ain, in the Ain département
- Corcelles-en-Beaujolais, in the Rhône département
- Corcelles-Ferrières, in the Doubs département
- Corcelles-les-Arts, in the Côte-d'Or département
- Corcelles-lès-Cîteaux, in the Côte-d'Or département
- Corcelles-les-Monts, in the Côte-d'Or département
