= Sincey-lès-Rouvray =

- Commune
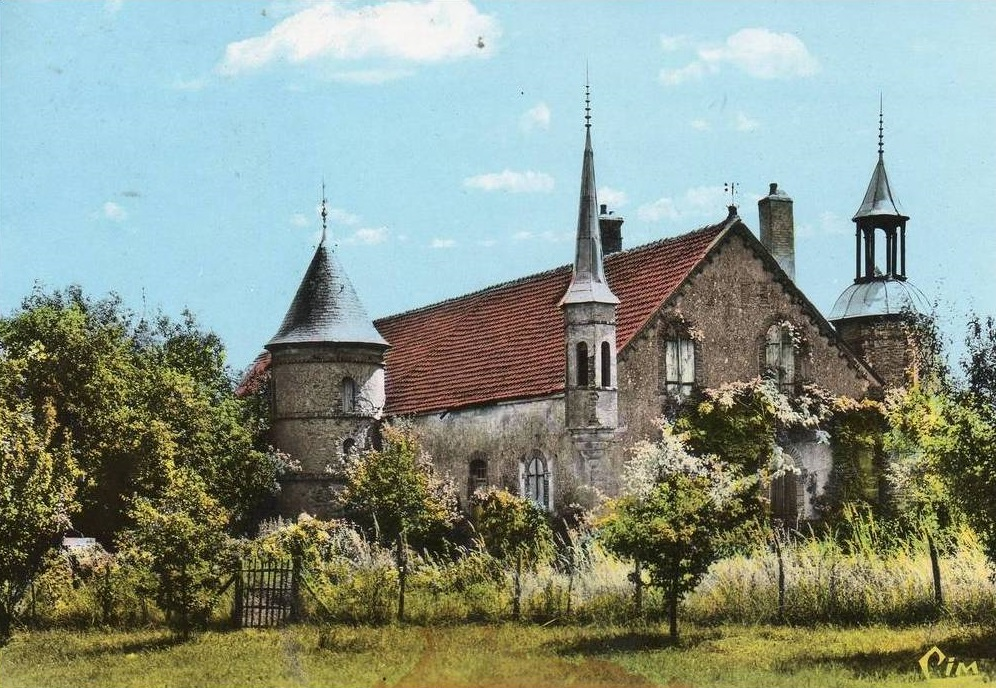
- The chateau in Sincey-lès-Rouvray
- Location of Sincey-lès-Rouvray
- Location within France Location within Bourgogne-Franche-Comté
- Coordinates: 47°25′55″N 4°07′57″E
- Country: France
- Region: Bourgogne-Franche-Comté
- Department: Côte-d'Or
- Arrondissement: Montbard
- Canton: Semur-en-Auxois
- Intercommunality: CC Saulieu-Morvan

Government
  - Mayor (2020–2026): François Cap
- Area^{1}: 8.73 km^{2} (3.37 sq mi)
- Highest elevation: 396 m (1,299 ft)
- Lowest elevation: 260 m (850 ft)
- Population (2023): 103
  - Density: 11.8/km^{2} (30.6/sq mi)
- Time zone: UTC+01:00 (CET)
  - Summer (DST): UTC+02:00 (CEST)
- INSEE/Postal code: 21608 /21530
- ^{1} French Land Register data, which excludes lakes, ponds, glaciers > 1 km^{2} (0.386 sq mi or 247 acres) and river estuaries.

Sincey-lès-Rouvray (French pronunciation: [sɛ̃sɛ lɛ ʁuvʁɛ], literally Sincey near Rouvray) is a commune in the Côte-d'Or department in eastern France.

== Population ==
Historical population
Year	Pop.	±% p.a.
1968	121	—
1975	137	+1.79%
1982	113	−2.71%
1990	94	−2.27%
1999	125	+3.22%
2007	119	−0.61%
2012	113	−1.03%
2017	101	−2.22%
2023	103	+0.33%
Source: INSEE

== See also ==
- Communes of the Côte-d'Or department
- Parc naturel régional du Morvan
- Sincey coal mines
