= Champdor =

Commune in Ain, France

- Part of Champdor-Corcelles
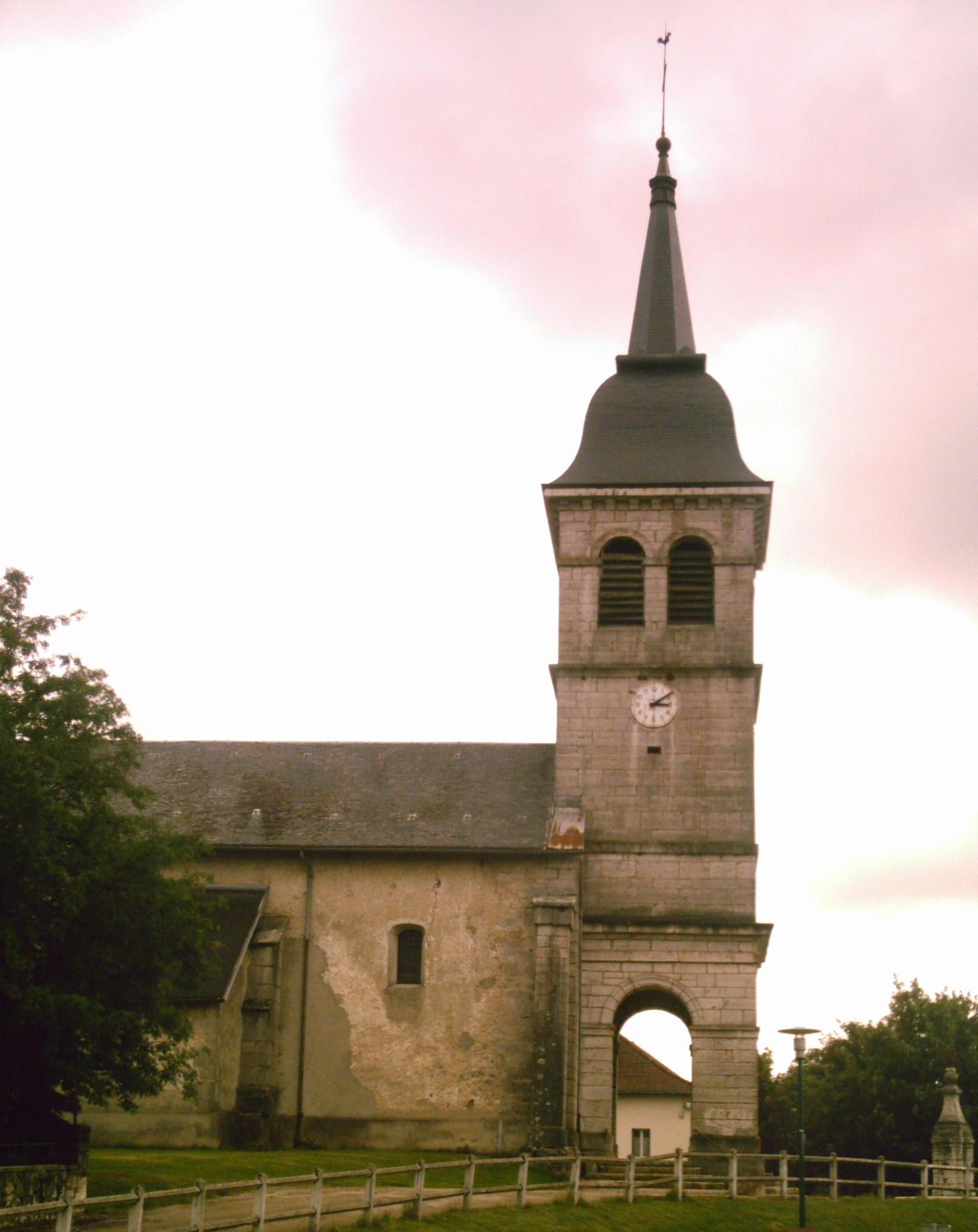

- Coat of arms
- Location of Champdor
- Location within France Location within Auvergne-Rhône-Alpes
- Coordinates: 46°01′05″N 5°35′52″E
- Country: France
- Region: Auvergne-Rhône-Alpes
- Department: Ain
- Arrondissement: Belley
- Canton: Plateau d'Hauteville
- Commune: Champdor-Corcelles
- Area^{1}: 17.37 km^{2} (6.71 sq mi)
- Elevation: 826 m (2,710 ft)
- Highest elevation: 1,183 m (3,881 ft)
- Lowest elevation: 798 m (2,618 ft)
- Population (2022): 447
  - Density: 25.7/km^{2} (66.7/sq mi)
- Time zone: UTC+01:00 (CET)
  - Summer (DST): UTC+02:00 (CEST)
- Postal code: 01110
- ^{1} French Land Register data, which excludes lakes, ponds, glaciers > 1 km^{2} (0.386 sq mi or 247 acres) and river estuaries.

Champdor (French pronunciation: [ʃɑ̃dɔʁ]) is a former commune in the Ain department in eastern France. On 1 January 2016, it was merged into the new commune Champdor-Corcelles.

== Geography ==
The river Albarine forms part of the commune's northwestern border, then flows south through the commune.

== Population ==
Historical population
Year	Pop.	±% p.a.
2006	438	—
2011	465	+1.20%
2022	447	−0.36%
Source: INSEE

== See also ==
- Communes of the Ain department
