= Thoste =

- Commune
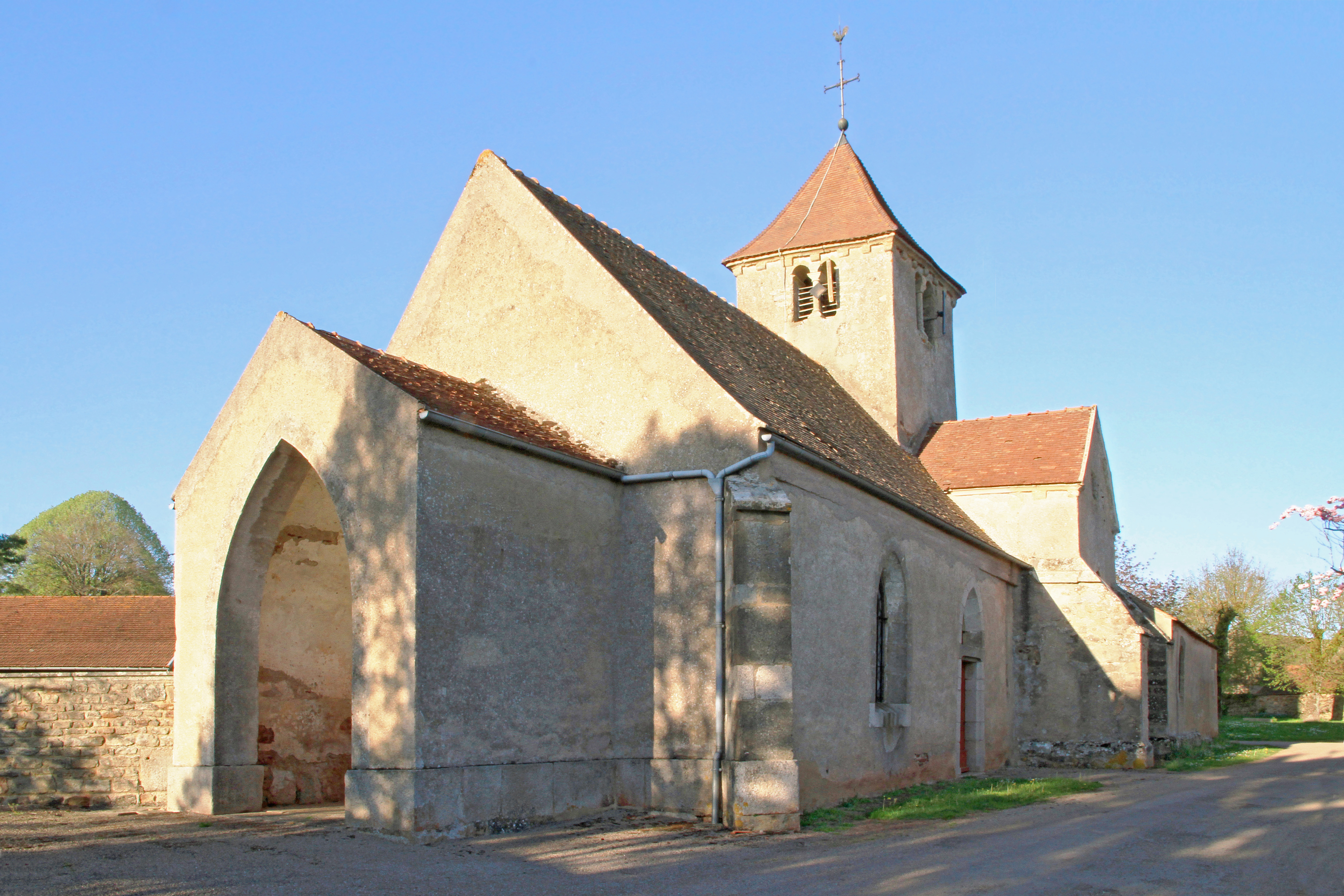
- The church in Thoste

- Coat of arms
- Location of Thoste
- Location within France Location within Bourgogne-Franche-Comté
- Coordinates: 47°26′14″N 4°13′36″E
- Country: France
- Region: Bourgogne-Franche-Comté
- Department: Côte-d'Or
- Arrondissement: Montbard
- Canton: Semur-en-Auxois

Government
  - Mayor (2020–2026): Dominique Poupee
- Area^{1}: 10.84 km^{2} (4.19 sq mi)
- Elevation: 360 m (1,180 ft)
- Highest elevation: 380 m (1,250 ft)
- Lowest elevation: 275 m (902 ft)
- Population (2023): 104
  - Density: 9.59/km^{2} (24.8/sq mi)
- Time zone: UTC+01:00 (CET)
  - Summer (DST): UTC+02:00 (CEST)
- INSEE/Postal code: 21635 /21460
- ^{1} French Land Register data, which excludes lakes, ponds, glaciers > 1 km^{2} (0.386 sq mi or 247 acres) and river estuaries.

Thoste (French pronunciation: [tot]) is a commune in the Côte-d'Or department in eastern France.

== Population ==
Historical population
Year	Pop.	±% p.a.
1968	169	—
1975	149	−1.78%
1982	136	−1.30%
1990	114	−2.18%
1999	108	−0.60%
2007	118	+1.11%
2012	115	−0.51%
2017	108	−1.25%
2023	104	−0.63%
Source: INSEE

== See also ==
- Communes of the Côte-d'Or department
