= Courcelles-Chaussy =

- Commune
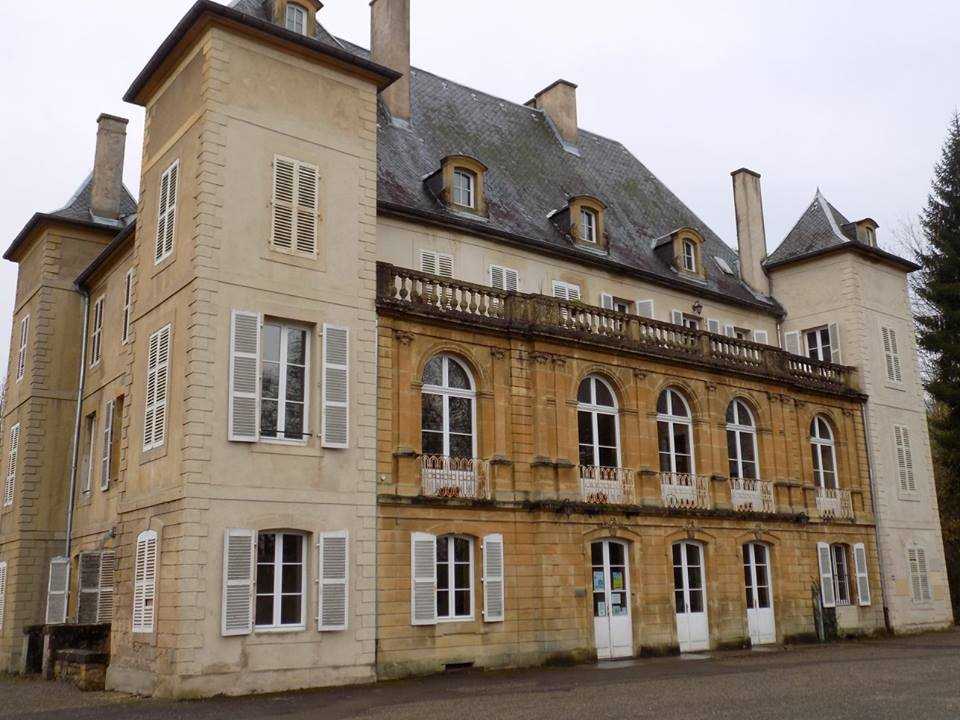
- The château of Urville

- Coat of arms
- Location of Courcelles-Chaussy
- Location within France Location within Grand Est
- Coordinates: 49°06′36″N 6°24′21″E
- Country: France
- Region: Grand Est
- Department: Moselle
- Arrondissement: Metz
- Canton: Le Pays Messin
- Intercommunality: Haut Chemin - Pays de Pange

Government
  - Mayor (2020–2026): Luc Giamberini
- Area^{1}: 19.02 km^{2} (7.34 sq mi)
- Elevation: 220 m (720 ft)
- Highest elevation: 307 m (1,007 ft)
- Lowest elevation: 207 m (679 ft)
- Population (2023): 3,006
  - Density: 158.0/km^{2} (409.3/sq mi)
- Time zone: UTC+01:00 (CET)
  - Summer (DST): UTC+02:00 (CEST)
- INSEE/Postal code: 57155 /57530
- ^{1} French Land Register data, which excludes lakes, ponds, glaciers > 1 km^{2} (0.386 sq mi or 247 acres) and river estuaries.

Courcelles-Chaussy (French pronunciation: [kuʁsɛl ʃosi]; German: Kurzel an der Straße) is a commune in the Moselle department in Grand Est in north-eastern France.

== Population ==
Historical population
Year	Pop.	±% p.a.
1968	1,321	—
1975	1,708	+3.74%
1982	2,263	+4.10%
1990	2,365	+0.55%
1999	2,392	+0.13%
2007	2,954	+2.67%
2012	3,048	+0.63%
2017	3,075	+0.18%
2023	3,006	−0.38%
Source: INSEE

== See also ==
- Communes of the Moselle department

== Gallery ==
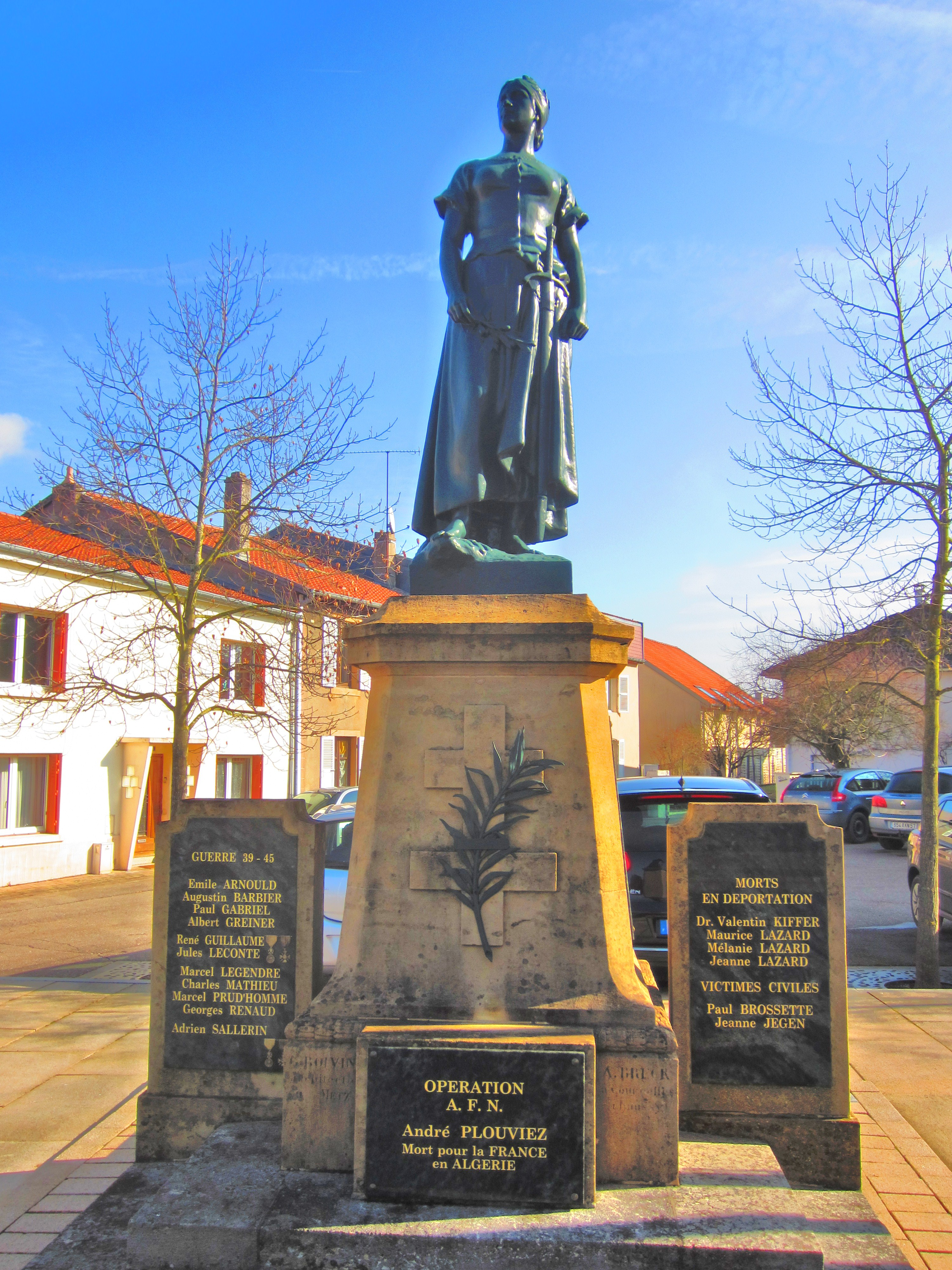
Courcelels-Chaussy monument

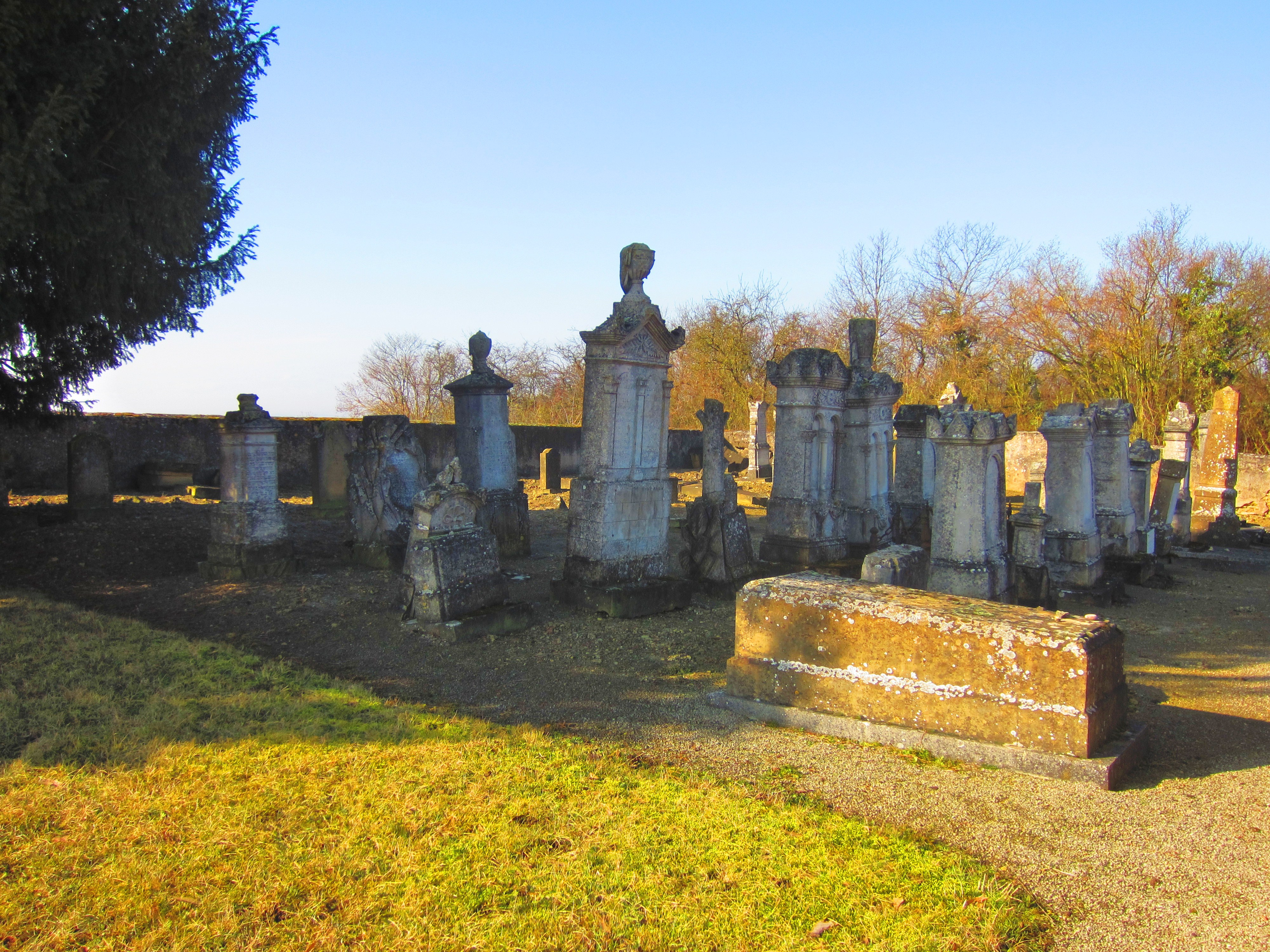
Courcelles-Chaussy Jewish cemetery

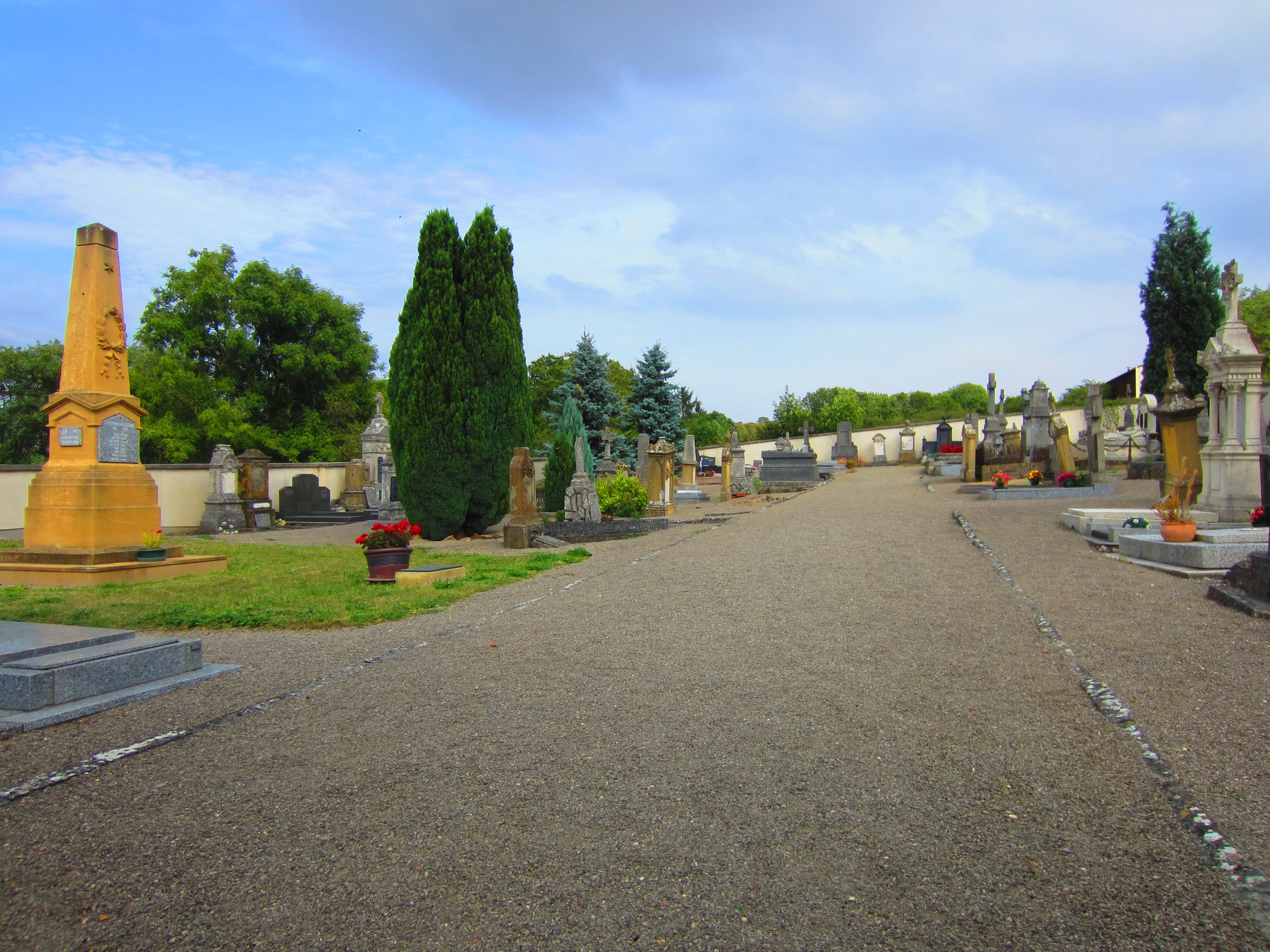
Courcelles-Chaussy Protestant cemetery
