= Corcelles, Ain =

Part of Champdor-Corcelles in Auvergne-Rhône-Alpes, France

Corcelles
- Part of Champdor-Corcelles
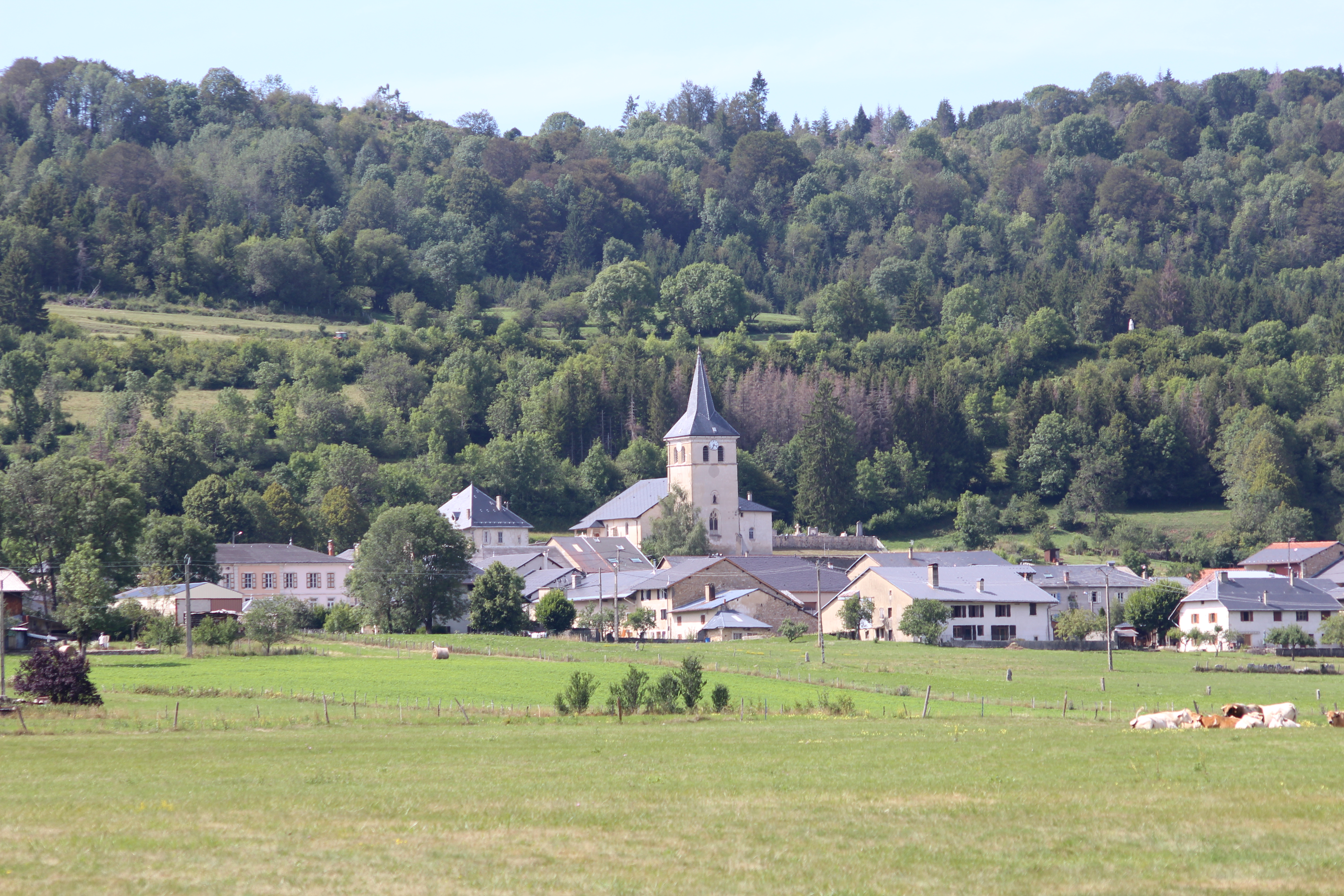

- Coat of arms
- Location of Corcelles
- Location within France Location within Auvergne-Rhône-Alpes
- Coordinates: 46°02′10″N 5°34′30″E
- Country: France
- Region: Auvergne-Rhône-Alpes
- Department: Ain
- Arrondissement: Nantua
- Canton: Plateau d'Hauteville
- Commune: Champdor-Corcelles
- Area^{1}: 14.16 km^{2} (5.47 sq mi)
- Elevation: 830 m (2,720 ft)
- Highest elevation: 1,081 m (3,547 ft)
- Lowest elevation: 780 m (2,560 ft)
- Population (2022): 208
  - Density: 14.7/km^{2} (38.0/sq mi)
- Time zone: UTC+01:00 (CET)
  - Summer (DST): UTC+02:00 (CEST)
- Postal code: 01110
- ^{1} French Land Register data, which excludes lakes, ponds, glaciers > 1 km^{2} (0.386 sq mi or 247 acres) and river estuaries.

Corcelles (French pronunciation: [kɔʁsɛl]) is a former commune in the Ain department in eastern France. On 1 January 2016, it was merged into the new commune Champdor-Corcelles.

== Geography ==
The river Albarine forms part of the commune's eastern border.

== Population ==
Historical population
Year	Pop.	±% p.a.
2006	198	—
2011	248	+4.61%
2022	208	−1.59%
Source: INSEE

== See also ==
- Communes of the Ain department
