= Courcelles-lès-Semur =

- Commune
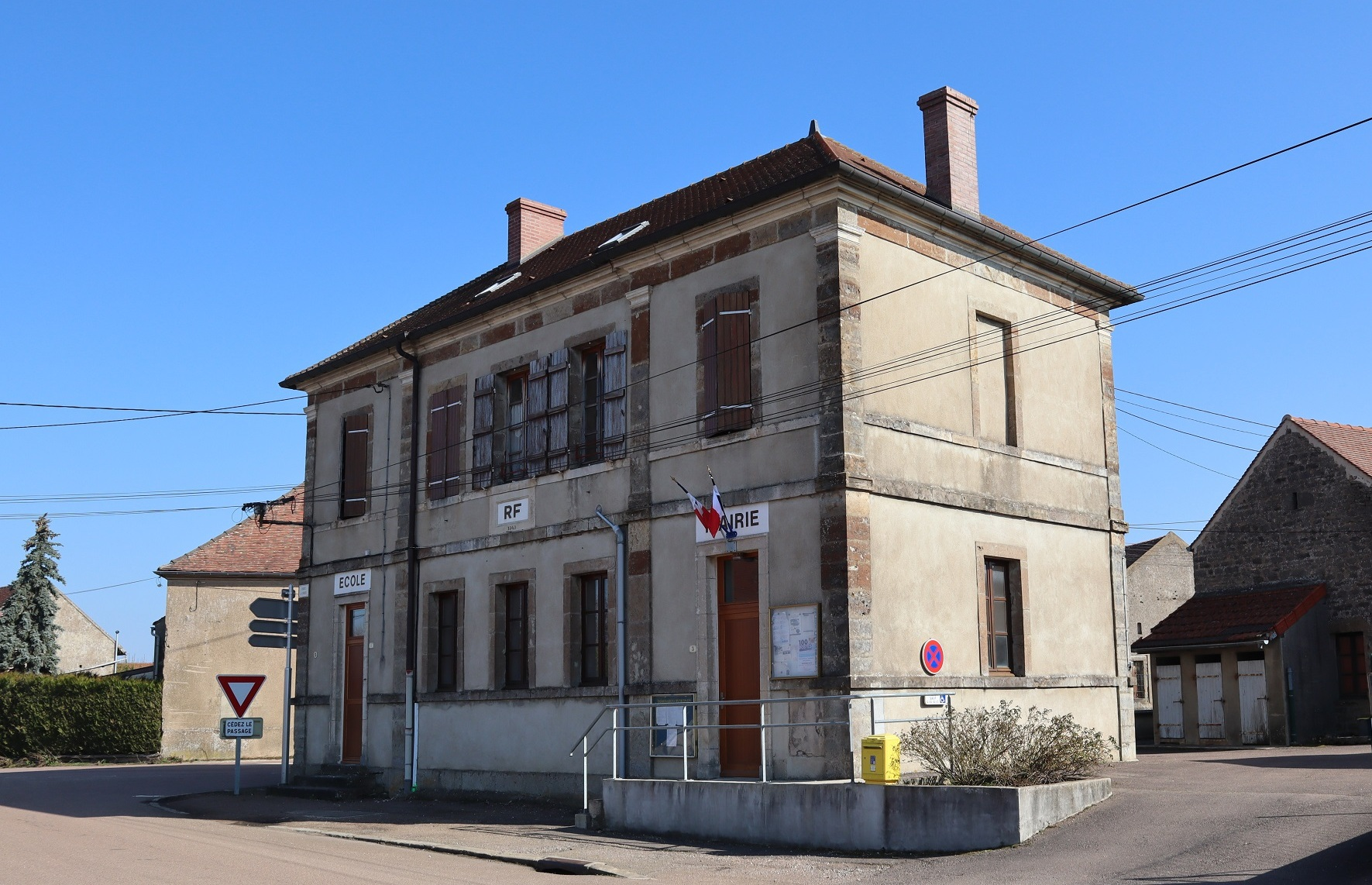
- Courcelles-lès-Semur Town hall

- Coat of arms
- Location of Courcelles-lès-Semur
- Location within France Location within Bourgogne-Franche-Comté
- Coordinates: 47°27′24″N 4°18′04″E
- Country: France
- Region: Bourgogne-Franche-Comté
- Department: Côte-d'Or
- Arrondissement: Montbard
- Canton: Semur-en-Auxois

Government
  - Mayor (2024–2026): Romuald Naudot
- Area^{1}: 12.03 km^{2} (4.64 sq mi)
- Elevation: 352 m (1,155 ft)
- Highest elevation: 387 m (1,270 ft)
- Lowest elevation: 297 m (974 ft)
- Population (2023): 221
  - Density: 18.4/km^{2} (47.6/sq mi)
- Time zone: UTC+01:00 (CET)
  - Summer (DST): UTC+02:00 (CEST)
- INSEE/Postal code: 21205 /21140
- ^{1} French Land Register data, which excludes lakes, ponds, glaciers > 1 km^{2} (0.386 sq mi or 247 acres) and river estuaries.

Courcelles-lès-Semur (French pronunciation: [kuʁsɛl lɛ səmyʁ], literally Courcelles near Semur is a commune in the Côte-d'Or department in eastern France.

== Population ==
Historical population
Year	Pop.	±% p.a.
1968	167	—
1975	161	−0.52%
1982	171	+0.86%
1990	193	+1.52%
1999	187	−0.35%
2007	228	+2.51%
2012	239	+0.95%
2017	245	+0.50%
2023	221	−1.70%
Source: INSEE

== See also ==
- Communes of the Côte-d'Or department
