= Courcelles-Frémoy =

- Commune
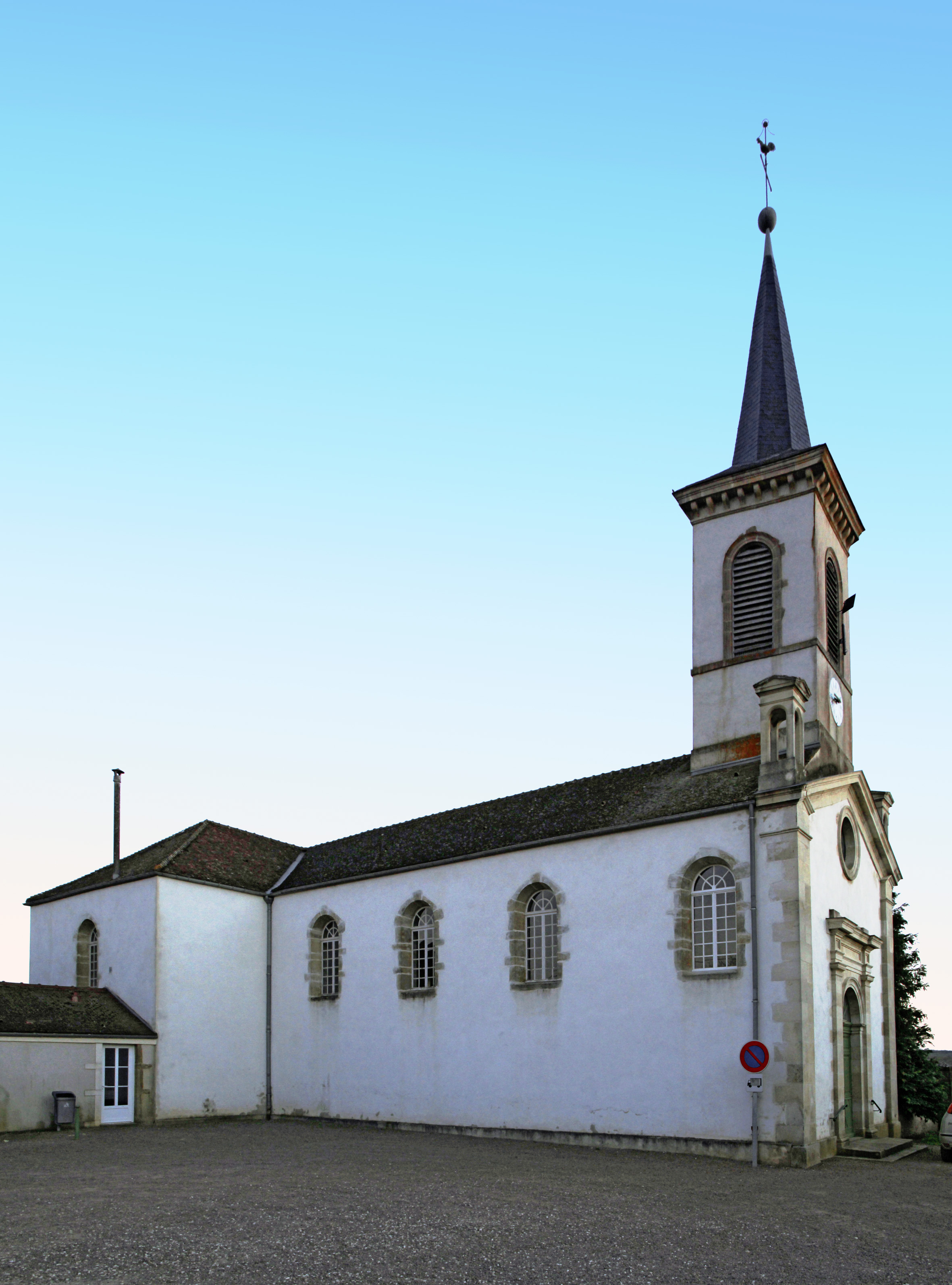
- The church in Courcelles-Frémoy
- Location of Courcelles-Frémoy
- Location within France Location within Bourgogne-Franche-Comté
- Coordinates: 47°27′03″N 4°10′25″E
- Country: France
- Region: Bourgogne-Franche-Comté
- Department: Côte-d'Or
- Arrondissement: Montbard
- Canton: Semur-en-Auxois

Government
  - Mayor (2020–2026): Edwige Sivry
- Area^{1}: 11.47 km^{2} (4.43 sq mi)
- Elevation: 340 m (1,120 ft)
- Highest elevation: 340 m (1,120 ft)
- Lowest elevation: 262 m (860 ft)
- Population (2023): 148
  - Density: 12.9/km^{2} (33.4/sq mi)
- Time zone: UTC+01:00 (CET)
  - Summer (DST): UTC+02:00 (CEST)
- INSEE/Postal code: 21203 /21460
- ^{1} French Land Register data, which excludes lakes, ponds, glaciers > 1 km^{2} (0.386 sq mi or 247 acres) and river estuaries.

Courcelles-Frémoy (French pronunciation: [kuʁsɛl fʁemwa]) is a commune in the Côte-d'Or department in eastern France.

== Population ==
Historical population
Year	Pop.	±% p.a.
1968	144	—
1975	104	−4.54%
1982	108	+0.54%
1990	125	+1.84%
1999	100	−2.45%
2007	119	+2.20%
2012	135	+2.56%
2017	124	−1.69%
2023	148	+2.99%
Source: INSEE

== See also ==
- Communes of the Côte-d'Or department
