= Bessey (disambiguation) =

Bessey may refer to:

== Places ==
- Bessey, a commune in the Loire department in central France
- Bessey-en-Chaume, a commune in the Côte-d'Or department in eastern France
- Bessey-la-Cour, a commune in the Côte-d'Or department in eastern France
- Bessey-lès-Cîteaux, a commune in the Côte-d'Or department in Burgundy in eastern France

== Other uses ==
- Bessey (surname)

== See also ==
- Bessey system, Bessey's taxonomic plant system
- Dudley-Bessey House, an historic family house located in Stuart, Martin County, Florida, United States
