= Marcheseuil =

- Commune
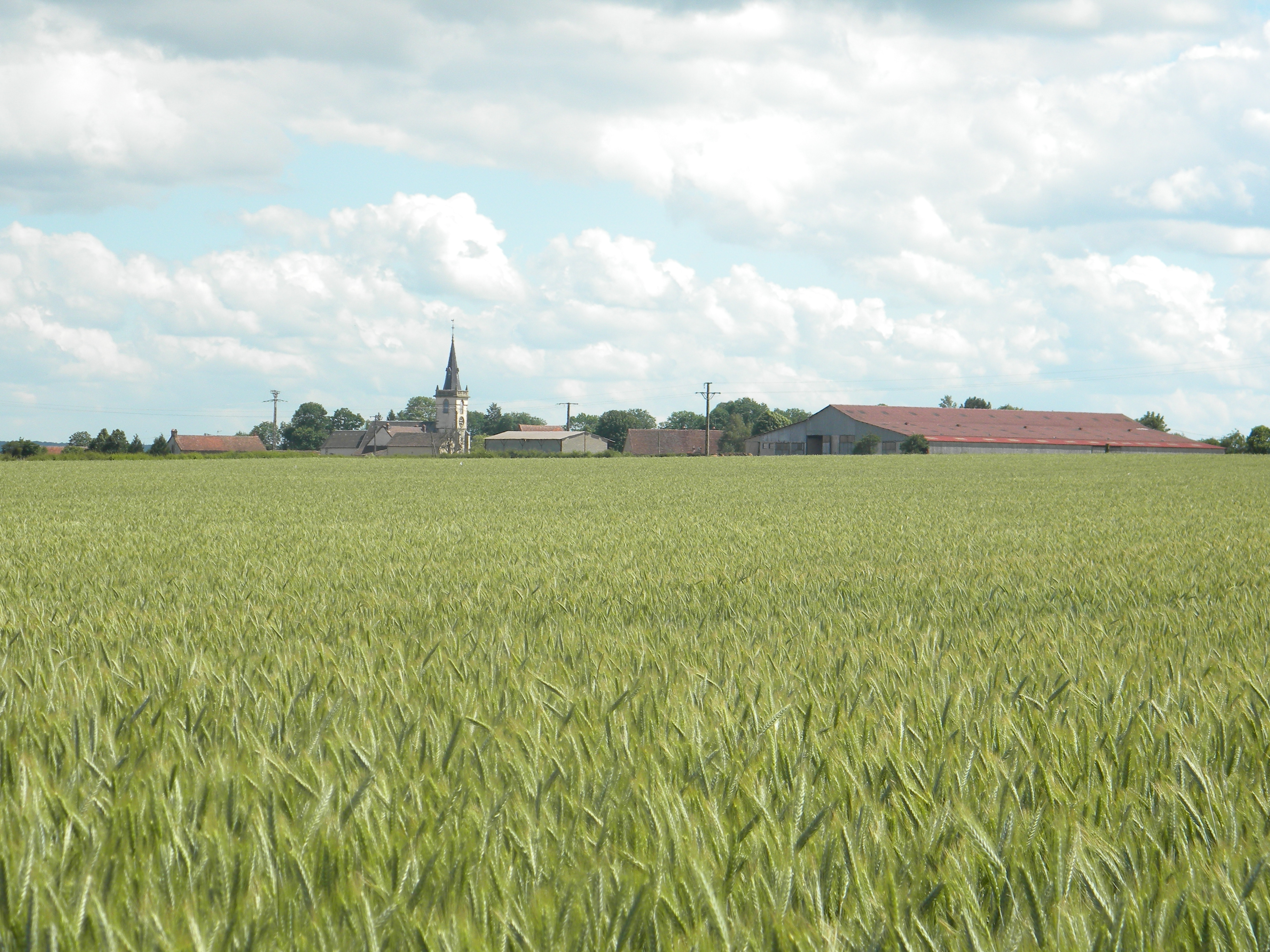
- A general view of Marcheseuil

- Coat of arms
- Location of Marcheseuil
- Location within France Location within Bourgogne-Franche-Comté
- Coordinates: 47°08′42″N 4°20′59″E
- Country: France
- Region: Bourgogne-Franche-Comté
- Department: Côte-d'Or
- Arrondissement: Beaune
- Canton: Arnay-le-Duc

Government
  - Mayor (2022–2026): Francis Guyot
- Area^{1}: 17.44 km^{2} (6.73 sq mi)
- Elevation: 430 m (1,410 ft)
- Highest elevation: 550 m (1,800 ft)
- Lowest elevation: 323 m (1,060 ft)
- Population (2023): 158
  - Density: 9.06/km^{2} (23.5/sq mi)
- Time zone: UTC+01:00 (CET)
  - Summer (DST): UTC+02:00 (CEST)
- INSEE/Postal code: 21379 /21430
- ^{1} French Land Register data, which excludes lakes, ponds, glaciers > 1 km^{2} (0.386 sq mi or 247 acres) and river estuaries.

Marcheseuil (French pronunciation: [maʁʃəzœj]) is a commune in the Côte-d'Or department in eastern France.

== Population ==
Historical population
Year	Pop.	±% p.a.
1968	226	—
1975	204	−1.45%
1982	181	−1.69%
1990	160	−1.53%
1999	156	−0.28%
2007	148	−0.66%
2012	169	+2.69%
2017	156	−1.59%
2023	158	+0.21%
Source: INSEE

== See also ==
- Communes of the Côte-d'Or department
