= Magnien =

- Commune
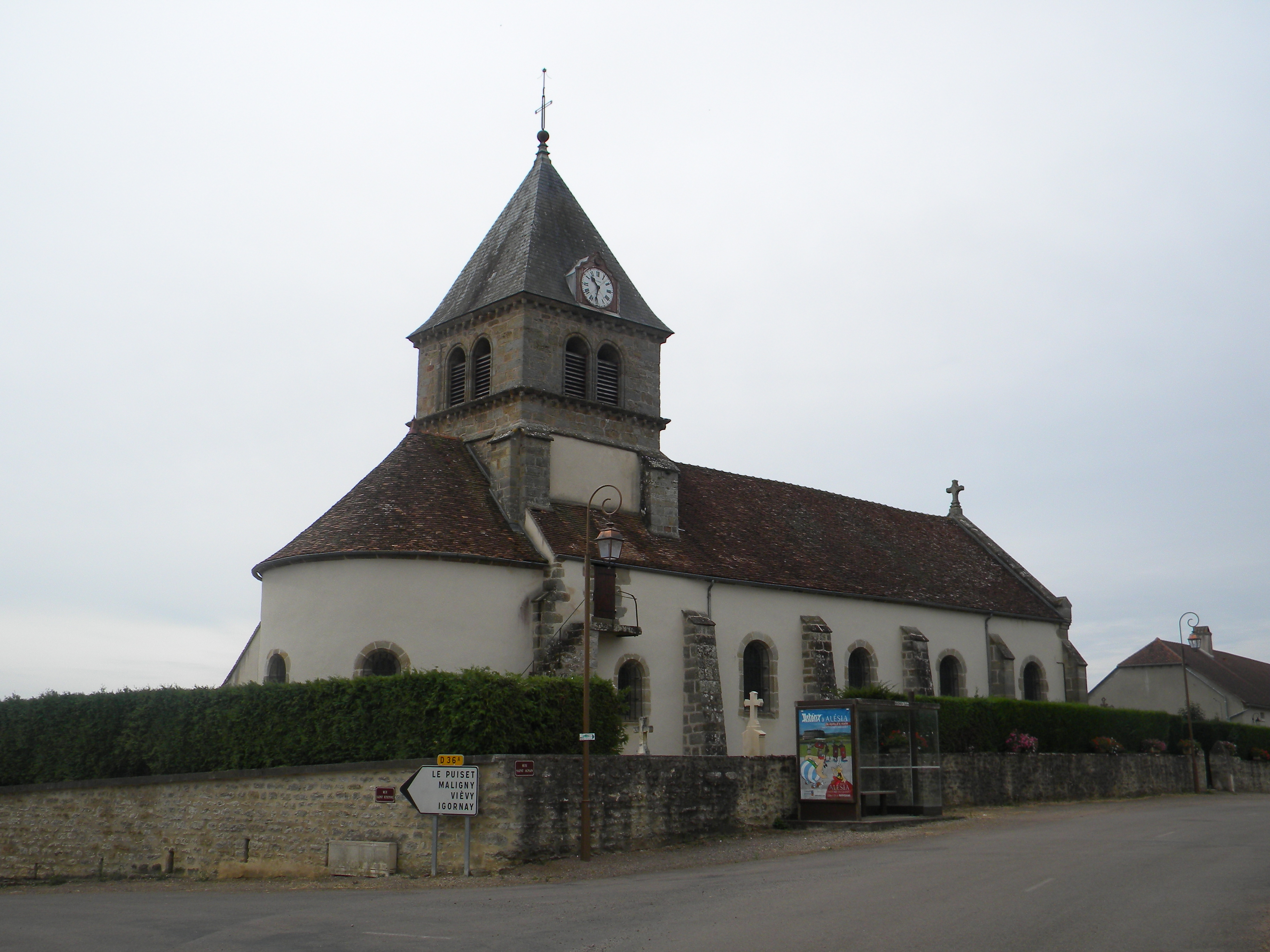
- The church in Magnien
- Location of Magnien
- Location within France Location within Bourgogne-Franche-Comté
- Coordinates: 47°06′08″N 4°26′19″E
- Country: France
- Region: Bourgogne-Franche-Comté
- Department: Côte-d'Or
- Arrondissement: Beaune
- Canton: Arnay-le-Duc

Government
  - Mayor (2020–2026): Jean-Louis Bouley
- Area^{1}: 24.43 km^{2} (9.43 sq mi)
- Highest elevation: 437 m (1,434 ft)
- Lowest elevation: 317 m (1,040 ft)
- Population (2023): 316
  - Density: 12.9/km^{2} (33.5/sq mi)
- Time zone: UTC+01:00 (CET)
  - Summer (DST): UTC+02:00 (CEST)
- INSEE/Postal code: 21363 /21230
- ^{1} French Land Register data, which excludes lakes, ponds, glaciers > 1 km^{2} (0.386 sq mi or 247 acres) and river estuaries.

Magnien (French pronunciation: [maɲɛ̃]) is a commune in the Côte-d'Or department in eastern France.

== Population ==
Historical population
Year	Pop.	±% p.a.
1968	392	—
1975	380	−0.44%
1982	350	−1.17%
1990	337	−0.47%
1999	301	−1.25%
2007	316	+0.61%
2012	345	+1.77%
2017	315	−1.80%
2023	316	+0.05%
Source: INSEE

== See also ==
- Communes of the Côte-d'Or department
