= Censerey =

- Commune
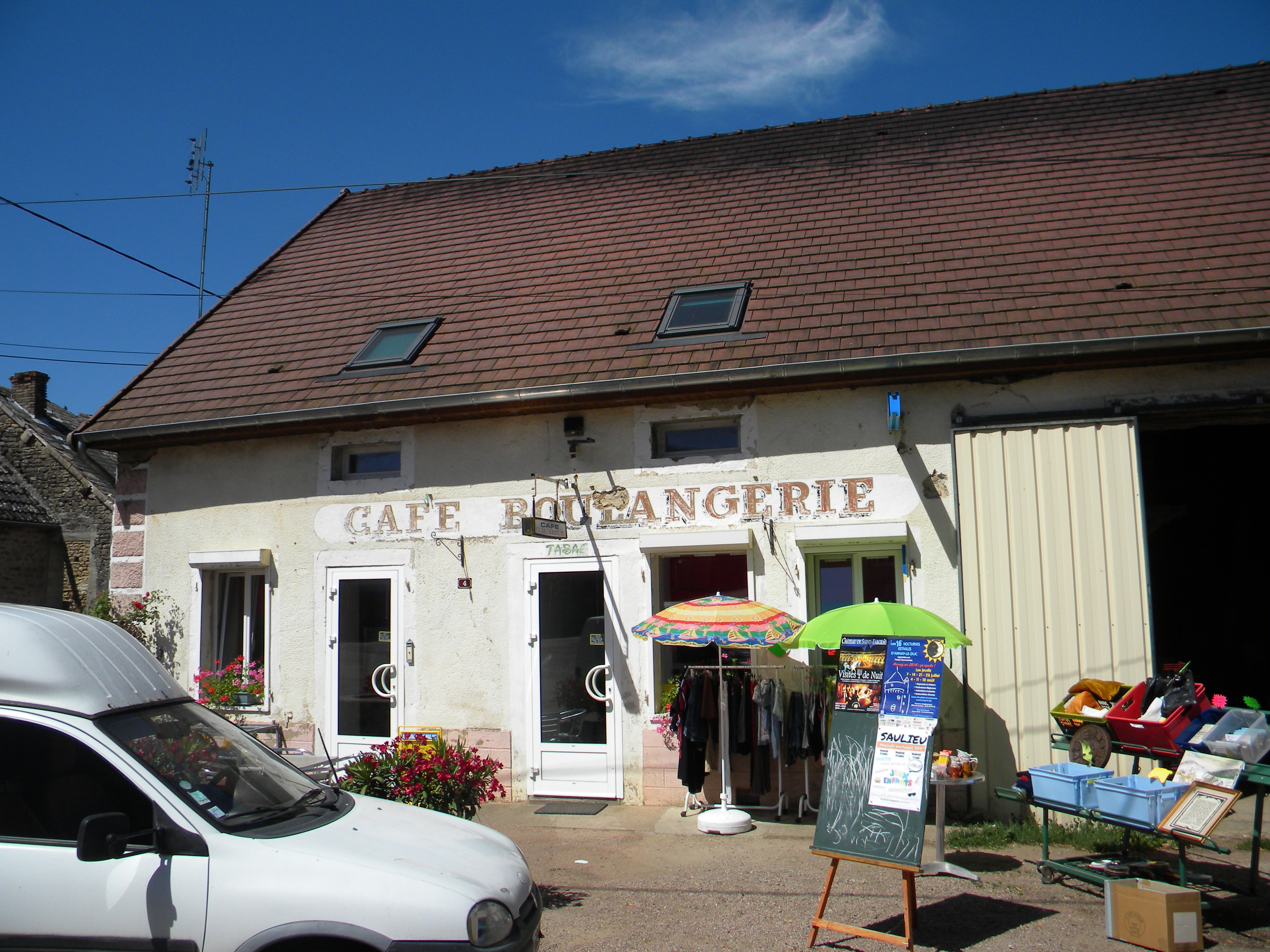
- The bakery in Censerey

- Coat of arms
- Location of Censerey
- Location within France Location within Bourgogne-Franche-Comté
- Coordinates: 47°12′12″N 4°21′18″E
- Country: France
- Region: Bourgogne-Franche-Comté
- Department: Côte-d'Or
- Arrondissement: Beaune
- Canton: Arnay-le-Duc

Government
  - Mayor (2020–2026): Geneviève Mortier
- Area^{1}: 11.99 km^{2} (4.63 sq mi)
- Elevation: 400 m (1,300 ft)
- Highest elevation: 490 m (1,610 ft)
- Lowest elevation: 367 m (1,204 ft)
- Population (2023): 182
  - Density: 15.2/km^{2} (39.3/sq mi)
- Time zone: UTC+01:00 (CET)
  - Summer (DST): UTC+02:00 (CEST)
- INSEE/Postal code: 21124 /21430
- ^{1} French Land Register data, which excludes lakes, ponds, glaciers > 1 km^{2} (0.386 sq mi or 247 acres) and river estuaries.

Censerey (French pronunciation: [sɑ̃sʁɛ]) is a commune in the Côte-d'Or department in eastern France.

== Population ==
Historical population
Year	Pop.	±% p.a.
1968	264	—
1975	237	−1.53%
1982	214	−1.45%
1990	209	−0.30%
1999	167	−2.46%
2007	178	+0.80%
2012	177	−0.11%
2017	171	−0.69%
2023	182	+1.04%
Source: INSEE

== See also ==
- Communes of the Côte-d'Or department
