= Champignolles, Côte-d'Or =

Champignolles
- Commune
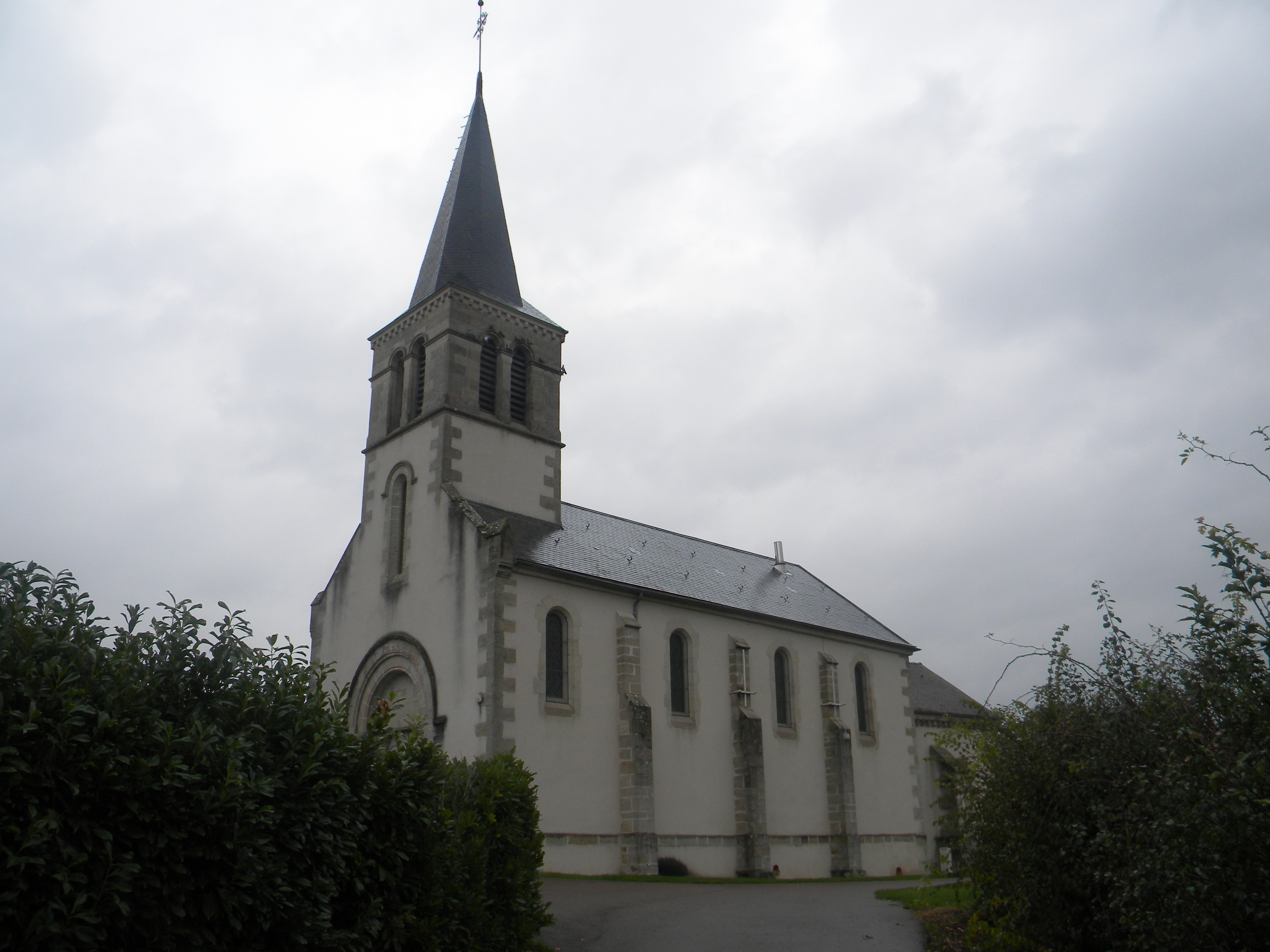
- The church in Champignolles

- Coat of arms
- Location of Champignolles
- Location within France Location within Bourgogne-Franche-Comté
- Coordinates: 47°03′22″N 4°34′02″E
- Country: France
- Region: Bourgogne-Franche-Comté
- Department: Côte-d'Or
- Arrondissement: Beaune
- Canton: Arnay-le-Duc
- Intercommunality: Pays Arnay Liernais

Government
  - Mayor (2021–2026): Christine Benard
- Area^{1}: 6.34 km^{2} (2.45 sq mi)
- Highest elevation: 457 m (1,499 ft)
- Lowest elevation: 352 m (1,155 ft)
- Population (2023): 76
  - Density: 12/km^{2} (31/sq mi)
- Time zone: UTC+01:00 (CET)
  - Summer (DST): UTC+02:00 (CEST)
- INSEE/Postal code: 21140 /21230
- ^{1} French Land Register data, which excludes lakes, ponds, glaciers > 1 km^{2} (0.386 sq mi or 247 acres) and river estuaries.

Champignolles (French pronunciation: [ʃɑ̃piɲɔl]) is a commune in the Côte-d'Or department in eastern France.

== Population ==
Historical population
Year	Pop.	±% p.a.
1968	105	—
1975	105	+0.00%
1982	108	+0.40%
1990	84	−3.09%
1999	79	−0.68%
2007	81	+0.31%
2012	70	−2.88%
2017	76	+1.66%
2023	76	+0.00%
Source: INSEE

== See also ==
- Communes of the Côte-d'Or department
