= Chaudenay-le-Château =

- Commune
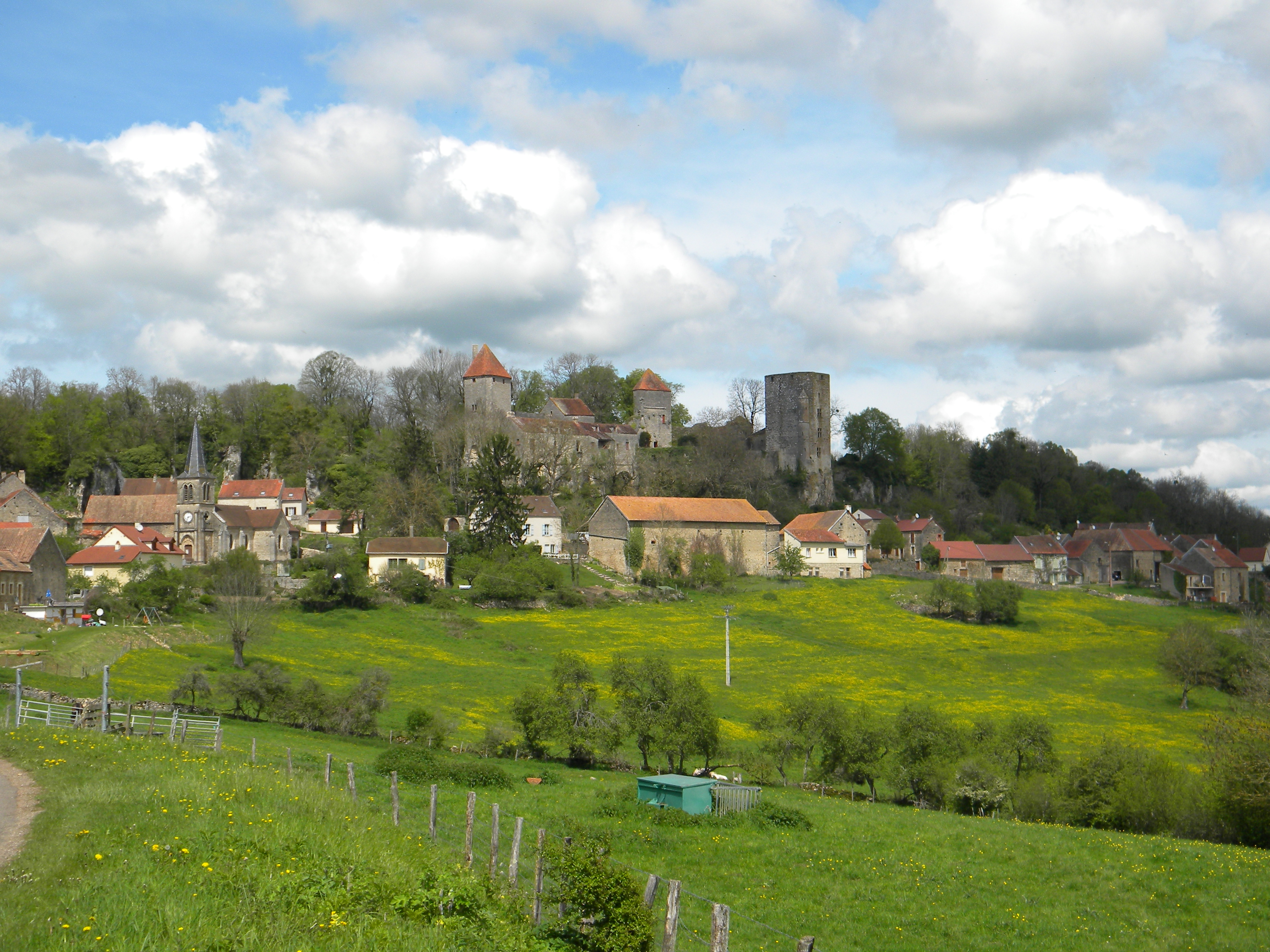
- A general view of Chaudenay-le-Château
- Location of Chaudenay-le-Château
- Location within France Location within Bourgogne-Franche-Comté
- Coordinates: 47°10′44″N 4°38′46″E
- Country: France
- Region: Bourgogne-Franche-Comté
- Department: Côte-d'Or
- Arrondissement: Beaune
- Canton: Arnay-le-Duc

Government
  - Mayor (2023–2026): Laurent Brocard
- Area^{1}: 5.27 km^{2} (2.03 sq mi)
- Elevation: 400 m (1,300 ft)
- Highest elevation: 521 m (1,709 ft)
- Lowest elevation: 355 m (1,165 ft)
- Population (2023): 48
  - Density: 9.1/km^{2} (24/sq mi)
- Time zone: UTC+01:00 (CET)
  - Summer (DST): UTC+02:00 (CEST)
- INSEE/Postal code: 21156 /21360
- ^{1} French Land Register data, which excludes lakes, ponds, glaciers > 1 km^{2} (0.386 sq mi or 247 acres) and river estuaries.

Chaudenay-le-Château (French pronunciation: [ʃodnɛ l(ə) ʃɑto]) is a commune in the Côte-d'Or department in eastern France.

== Population ==
Historical population
Year	Pop.	±% p.a.
1968	35	—
1975	29	−2.65%
1982	28	−0.50%
1990	33	+2.08%
1999	36	+0.97%
2007	43	+2.25%
2012	47	+1.79%
2017	49	+0.84%
2023	48	−0.34%
Source: INSEE

== See also ==
- Communes of the Côte-d'Or department
