= Canton of Arnay-le-Duc =

Administrative division of the Côte-d'Or department, France

Coordinates: 47.13°N 4.49°E

The canton of Arnay-le-Duc is an administrative division of the Côte-d'Or department, eastern France. Its borders were modified at the French canton reorganisation which came into effect in March 2015. Its seat is in Arnay-le-Duc.

It consists of the following communes:

1. Allerey
2. Antheuil
3. Antigny-la-Ville
4. Arconcey
5. Arnay-le-Duc
6. Aubaine
7. Aubigny-la-Ronce
8. Auxant
9. Bard-le-Régulier
10. Baubigny
11. Bellenot-sous-Pouilly
12. Bessey-en-Chaume
13. Bessey-la-Cour
14. Beurey-Bauguay
15. Blancey
16. Blanot
17. Bligny-sur-Ouche
18. Bouhey
19. Brazey-en-Morvan
20. La Bussière-sur-Ouche
21. Censerey
22. Chailly-sur-Armançon
23. Champignolles
24. Châteauneuf
25. Châtellenot
26. Chaudenay-la-Ville
27. Chaudenay-le-Château
28. Chazilly
29. Civry-en-Montagne
30. Clomot
31. Colombier
32. Commarin
33. Cormot-Vauchignon
34. Créancey
35. Crugey
36. Culètre
37. Cussy-la-Colonne
38. Cussy-le-Châtel
39. Diancey
40. Écutigny
41. Éguilly
42. Essey
43. Le Fête
44. Foissy
45. Jouey
46. Lacanche
47. Liernais
48. Longecourt-lès-Culêtre
49. Lusigny-sur-Ouche
50. Maconge
51. Magnien
52. Maligny
53. Manlay
54. Marcheseuil
55. Marcilly-Ogny
56. Martrois
57. Meilly-sur-Rouvres
58. Ménessaire
59. Mimeure
60. Molinot
61. Montceau-et-Écharnant
62. Mont-Saint-Jean
63. Musigny
64. Nolay
65. Painblanc
66. Pouilly-en-Auxois
67. La Rochepot
68. Rouvres-sous-Meilly
69. Sainte-Sabine
70. Saint-Martin-de-la-Mer
71. Saint-Pierre-en-Vaux
72. Saint-Prix-lès-Arnay
73. Santosse
74. Saussey
75. Savilly
76. Semarey
77. Sussey
78. Thoisy-le-Désert
79. Thomirey
80. Thorey-sur-Ouche
81. Thury
82. Val-Mont
83. Vandenesse-en-Auxois
84. Veilly
85. Veuvey-sur-Ouche
86. Vianges
87. Vic-des-Prés
88. Viévy
89. Villiers-en-Morvan
90. Voudenay
