= Blancey =

- Commune
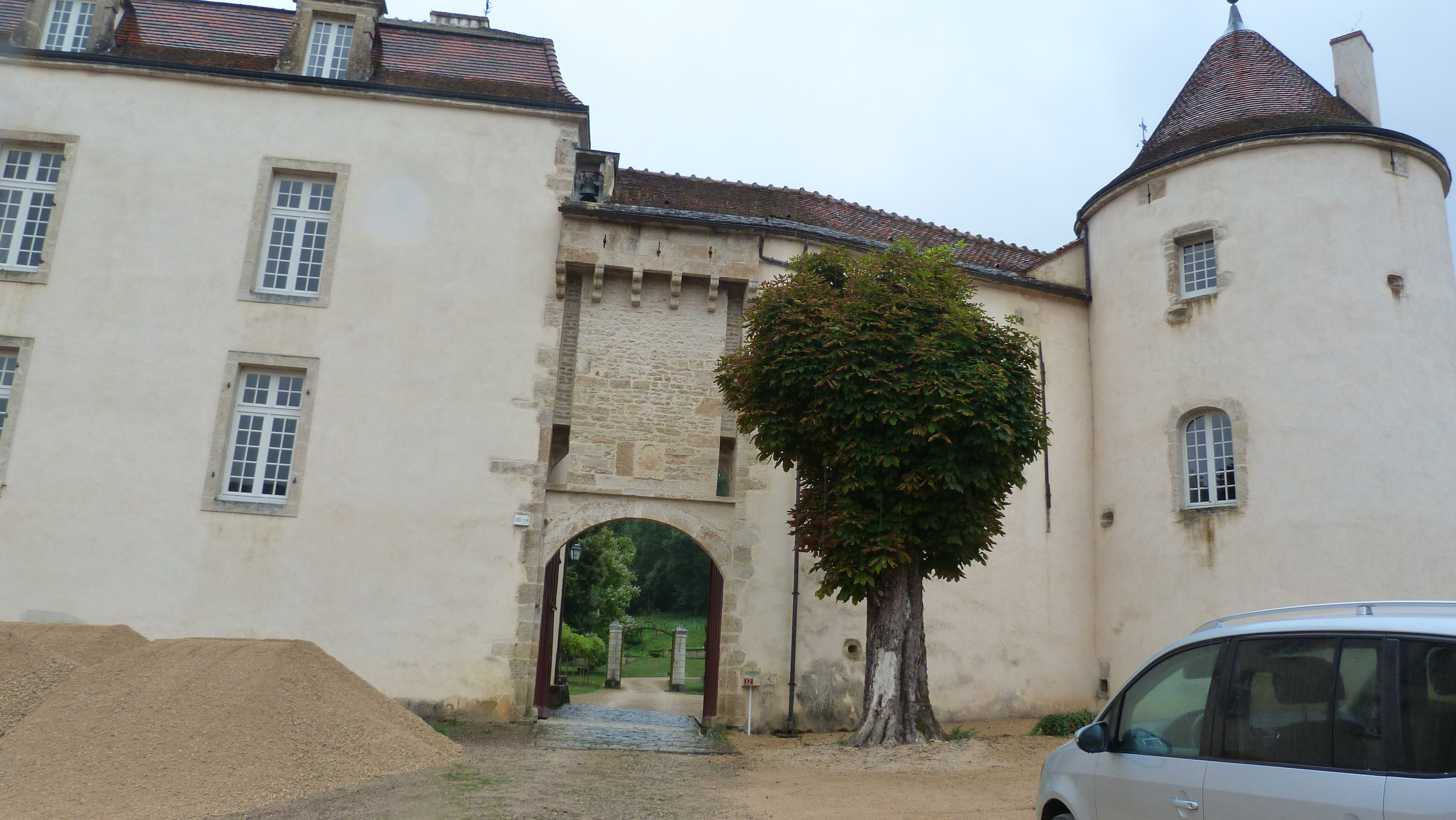
- The chateau in Blancey
- Location of Blancey
- Location within France Location within Bourgogne-Franche-Comté
- Coordinates: 47°18′16″N 4°27′59″E
- Country: France
- Region: Bourgogne-Franche-Comté
- Department: Côte-d'Or
- Arrondissement: Beaune
- Canton: Arnay-le-Duc

Government
  - Mayor (2020–2026): Magali Herbert
- Area^{1}: 6.73 km^{2} (2.60 sq mi)
- Elevation: 390 m (1,280 ft)
- Highest elevation: 519 m (1,703 ft)
- Lowest elevation: 361 m (1,184 ft)
- Population (2023): 53
  - Density: 7.9/km^{2} (20/sq mi)
- Time zone: UTC+01:00 (CET)
  - Summer (DST): UTC+02:00 (CEST)
- INSEE/Postal code: 21082 /21320
- ^{1} French Land Register data, which excludes lakes, ponds, glaciers > 1 km^{2} (0.386 sq mi or 247 acres) and river estuaries.

Blancey (French pronunciation: [blɑ̃sɛ]) is a commune in the Côte-d'Or department in eastern France.

== Population ==
Historical population
Year	Pop.	±% p.a.
1968	75	—
1975	73	−0.39%
1982	64	−1.86%
1990	62	−0.40%
1999	60	−0.36%
2007	72	+2.31%
2012	69	−0.85%
2017	75	+1.68%
2023	53	−5.62%
Source: INSEE

== See also ==
- Communes of the Côte-d'Or department
