= Thomirey =

- Commune
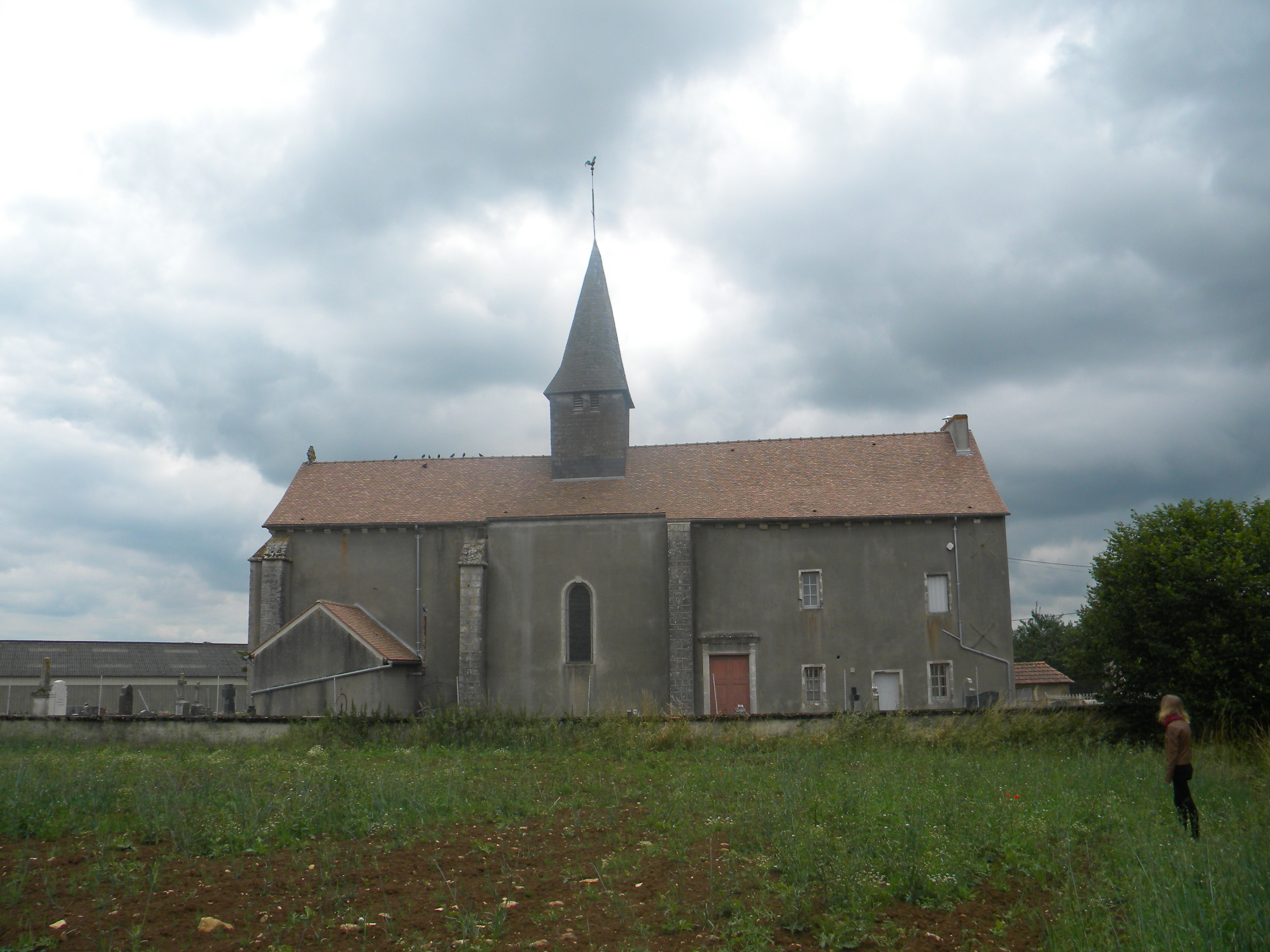
- The church in Thomirey
- Location of Thomirey
- Location within France Location within Bourgogne-Franche-Comté
- Coordinates: 47°04′56″N 4°35′26″E
- Country: France
- Region: Bourgogne-Franche-Comté
- Department: Côte-d'Or
- Arrondissement: Beaune
- Canton: Arnay-le-Duc

Government
  - Mayor (2020–2026): Denis Fichot
- Area^{1}: 7.07 km^{2} (2.73 sq mi)
- Elevation: 420 m (1,380 ft)
- Highest elevation: 435 m (1,427 ft)
- Lowest elevation: 405 m (1,329 ft)
- Population (2023): 56
  - Density: 7.9/km^{2} (21/sq mi)
- Time zone: UTC+01:00 (CET)
  - Summer (DST): UTC+02:00 (CEST)
- INSEE/Postal code: 21631 /21360
- ^{1} French Land Register data, which excludes lakes, ponds, glaciers > 1 km^{2} (0.386 sq mi or 247 acres) and river estuaries.

Thomirey (French pronunciation: [tɔmiʁɛ]) is a commune in the Côte-d'Or department in eastern France. It is on the D104 road, 23 km north west of Beaune. The village is on the Lacanche river, and includes the body of water known as the Etang de Rouhey.

== Population ==
Historical population
Year	Pop.	±% p.a.
1968	75	—
1975	66	−1.81%
1982	63	−0.66%
1990	53	−2.14%
1999	54	+0.21%
2007	56	+0.46%
2012	51	−1.85%
2017	50	−0.40%
2023	56	+1.91%
Source: INSEE

== See also ==
- Communes of the Côte-d'Or department
