= Montceau-et-Écharnant =

- Commune
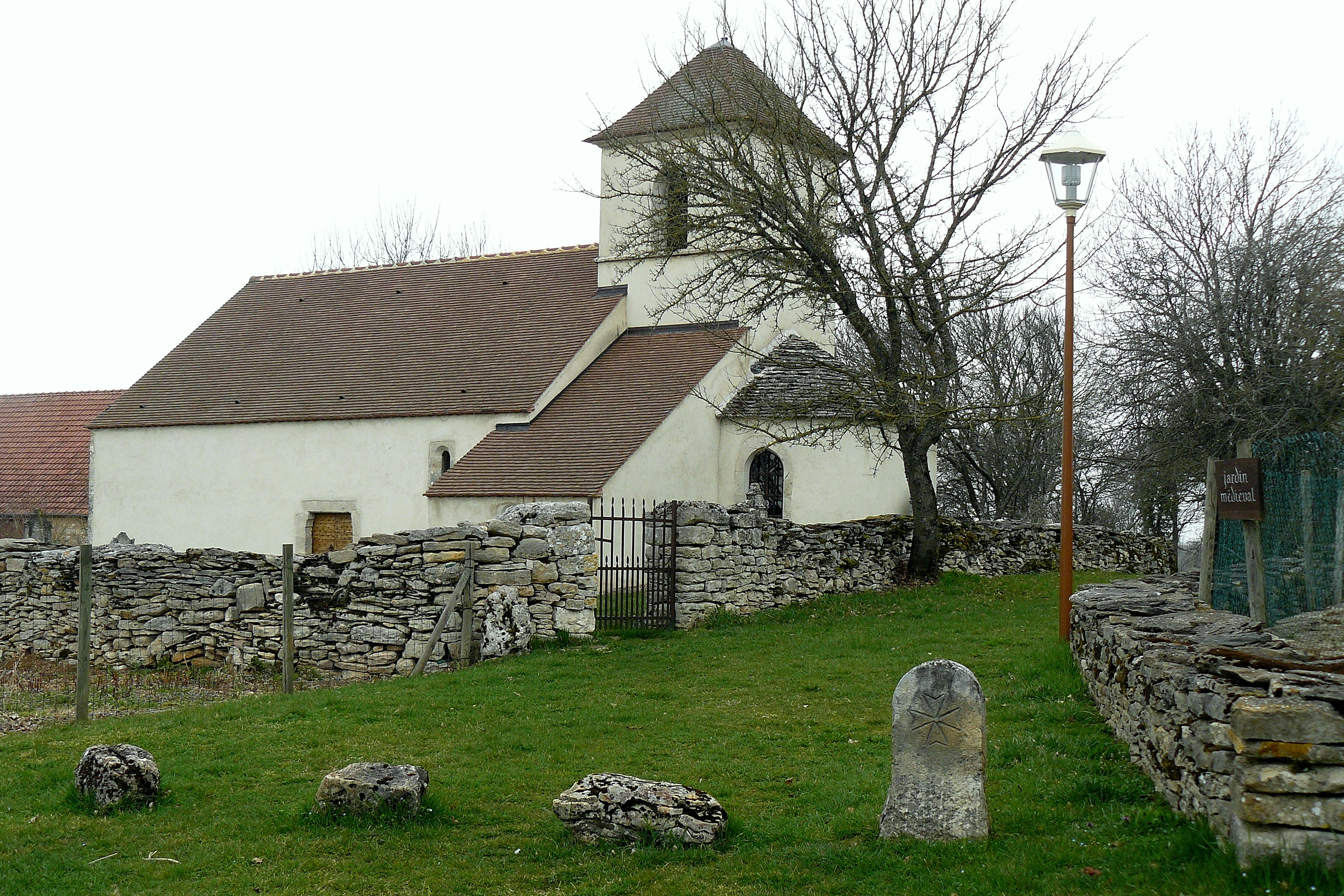
- The chapel of Écharnant

- Coat of arms
- Location of Montceau-et-Écharnant
- Location within France Location within Bourgogne-Franche-Comté
- Coordinates: 47°03′41″N 4°39′32″E
- Country: France
- Region: Bourgogne-Franche-Comté
- Department: Côte-d'Or
- Arrondissement: Beaune
- Canton: Arnay-le-Duc

Government
  - Mayor (2020–2026): Pascal Janiszewski
- Area^{1}: 18.58 km^{2} (7.17 sq mi)
- Elevation: 509 m (1,670 ft)
- Highest elevation: 551 m (1,808 ft)
- Lowest elevation: 379 m (1,243 ft)
- Population (2023): 173
  - Density: 9.31/km^{2} (24.1/sq mi)
- Time zone: UTC+01:00 (CET)
  - Summer (DST): UTC+02:00 (CEST)
- INSEE/Postal code: 21427 /21360
- ^{1} French Land Register data, which excludes lakes, ponds, glaciers > 1 km^{2} (0.386 sq mi or 247 acres) and river estuaries.

Montceau-et-Écharnant (French pronunciation: [mɔ̃so e eʃaʁnɑ̃]) is a commune in the Côte-d'Or department in eastern France.

== Population ==
Historical population
Year	Pop.	±% p.a.
1968	143	—
1975	126	−1.79%
1982	121	−0.58%
1990	118	−0.31%
1999	121	+0.28%
2007	142	+2.02%
2012	160	+2.42%
2017	180	+2.38%
2023	173	−0.66%
Source: INSEE

== See also ==
- Communes of the Côte-d'Or department
