= Saussey, Côte-d'Or =

Commune in Côte-d'Or, France

Saussey
- Commune
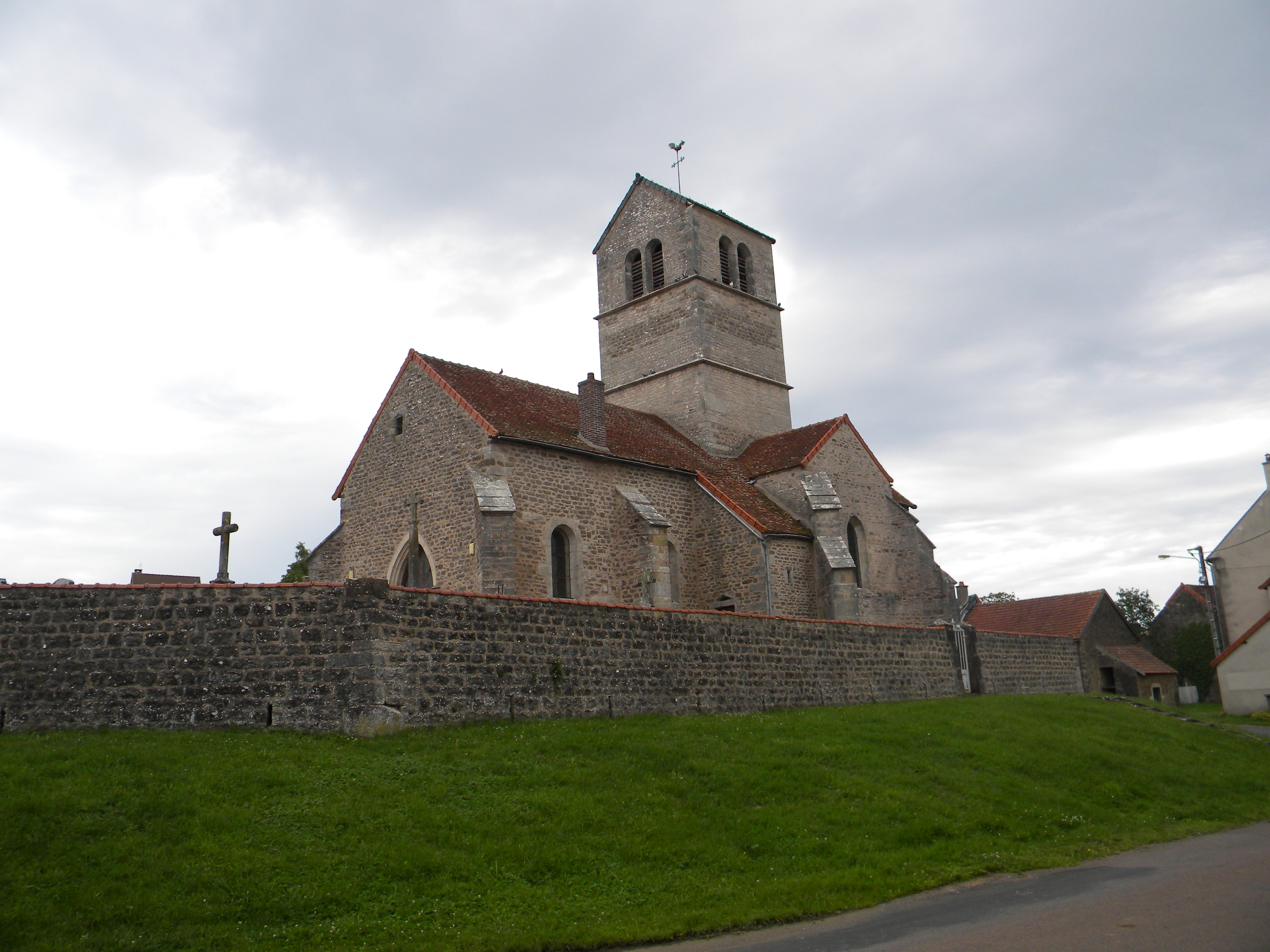
- The church in Saussey
- Location of Saussey
- Location within France Location within Bourgogne-Franche-Comté
- Coordinates: 47°04′15″N 4°36′37″E
- Country: France
- Region: Bourgogne-Franche-Comté
- Department: Côte-d'Or
- Arrondissement: Beaune
- Canton: Arnay-le-Duc

Government
  - Mayor (2020–2026): Hubert Dévelle
- Area^{1}: 8.97 km^{2} (3.46 sq mi)
- Elevation: 440 m (1,440 ft)
- Highest elevation: 471 m (1,545 ft)
- Lowest elevation: 409 m (1,342 ft)
- Population (2023): 74
  - Density: 8.2/km^{2} (21/sq mi)
- Time zone: UTC+01:00 (CET)
  - Summer (DST): UTC+02:00 (CEST)
- INSEE/Postal code: 21588 /21360
- ^{1} French Land Register data, which excludes lakes, ponds, glaciers > 1 km^{2} (0.386 sq mi or 247 acres) and river estuaries.

Saussey (French pronunciation: [sosɛ]) is a commune in the Côte-d'Or department in eastern France.

== Population ==
Historical population
Year	Pop.	±% p.a.
1968	137	—
1975	132	−0.53%
1982	102	−3.62%
1990	85	−2.25%
1999	85	+0.00%
2007	83	−0.30%
2012	83	+0.00%
2017	72	−2.80%
2023	74	+0.46%
Source: INSEE

== See also ==
- Communes of the Côte-d'Or department
