= Le Fête =

- Commune
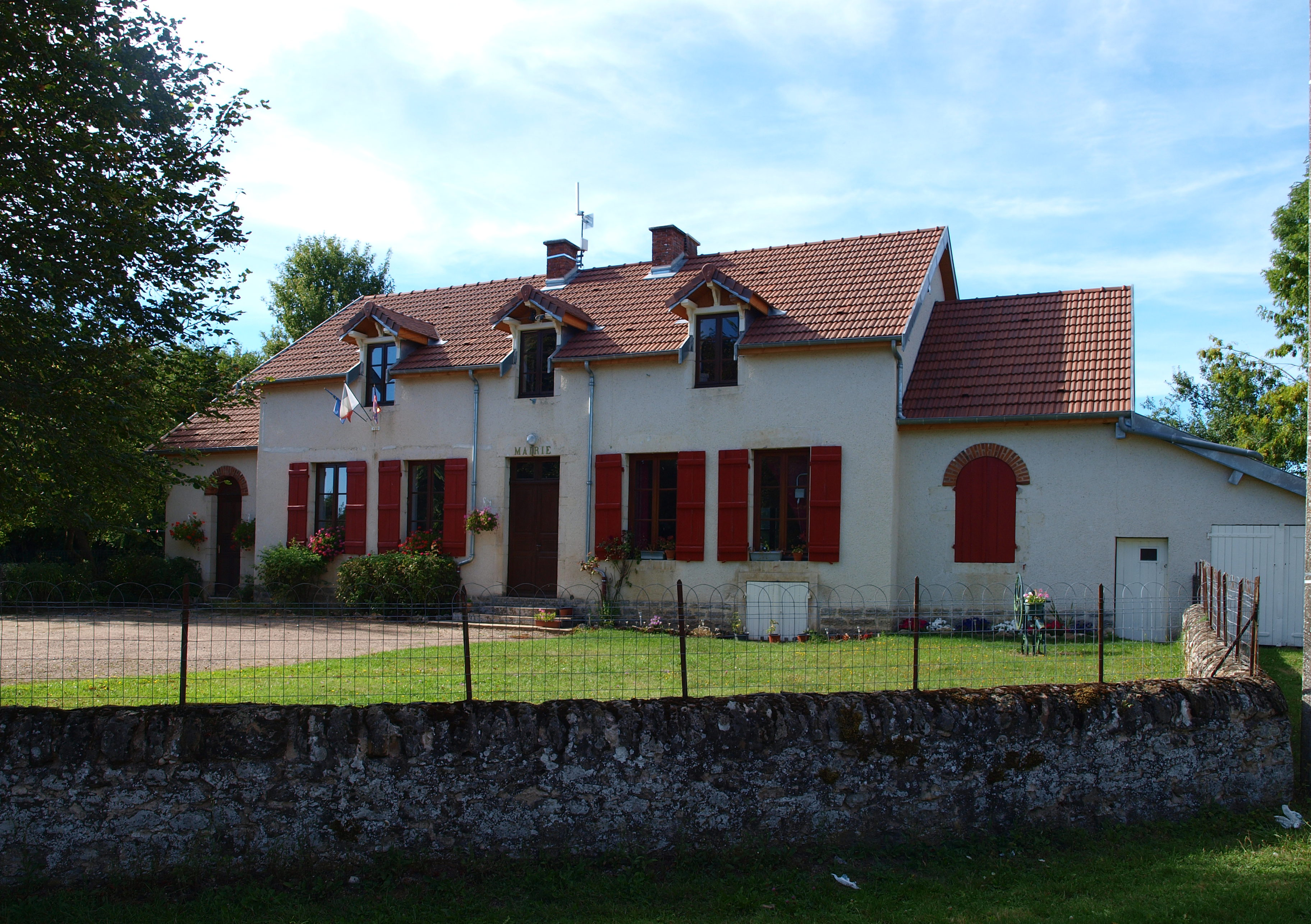
- Town hall
- Location of Le Fête
- Location within France Location within Bourgogne-Franche-Comté
- Coordinates: 47°11′03″N 4°30′36″E
- Country: France
- Region: Bourgogne-Franche-Comté
- Department: Côte-d'Or
- Arrondissement: Beaune
- Canton: Arnay-le-Duc

Government
  - Mayor (2020–2026): Jean Decombard
- Area^{1}: 3.11 km^{2} (1.20 sq mi)
- Highest elevation: 402 m (1,319 ft)
- Lowest elevation: 354 m (1,161 ft)
- Population (2023): 51
  - Density: 16/km^{2} (42/sq mi)
- Time zone: UTC+01:00 (CET)
  - Summer (DST): UTC+02:00 (CEST)
- INSEE/Postal code: 21264 /21230
- ^{1} French Land Register data, which excludes lakes, ponds, glaciers > 1 km^{2} (0.386 sq mi or 247 acres) and river estuaries.

Le Fête (French pronunciation: [lə fɛt]) is a commune in the Côte-d'Or department in eastern France.

== Population ==
Historical population
Year	Pop.	±% p.a.
1968	64	—
1975	55	−2.14%
1982	55	+0.00%
1990	51	−0.94%
1999	45	−1.38%
2007	48	+0.81%
2012	50	+0.82%
2017	48	−0.81%
2023	51	+1.02%
Source: INSEE

== See also ==
- Communes of the Côte-d'Or department
