= Veilly =

- Commune
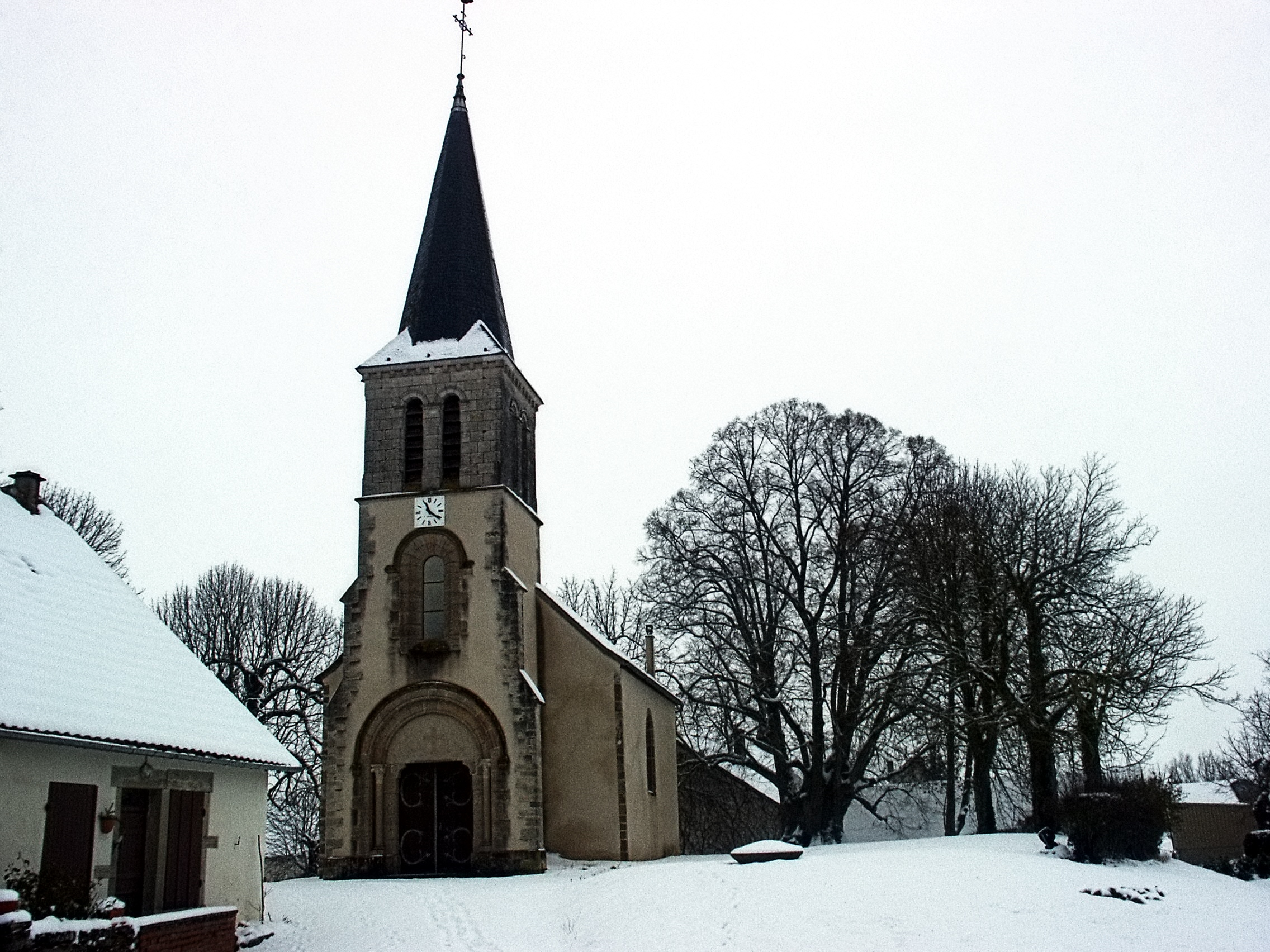
- The church in Veilly

- Coat of arms
- Location of Veilly
- Location within France Location within Bourgogne-Franche-Comté
- Coordinates: 47°07′40″N 4°35′59″E
- Country: France
- Region: Bourgogne-Franche-Comté
- Department: Côte-d'Or
- Arrondissement: Beaune
- Canton: Arnay-le-Duc

Government
  - Mayor (2020–2026): Daniel Barbier
- Area^{1}: 5.39 km^{2} (2.08 sq mi)
- Elevation: 398 m (1,306 ft)
- Highest elevation: 452 m (1,483 ft)
- Lowest elevation: 384 m (1,260 ft)
- Population (2023): 59
  - Density: 11/km^{2} (28/sq mi)
- Time zone: UTC+01:00 (CET)
  - Summer (DST): UTC+02:00 (CEST)
- INSEE/Postal code: 21660 /21360
- ^{1} French Land Register data, which excludes lakes, ponds, glaciers > 1 km^{2} (0.386 sq mi or 247 acres) and river estuaries.

Veilly (French pronunciation: [vɛji]) is a commune in the Côte-d'Or department in eastern France. It is a remote farming village in Bourgogne-Franche-Comté.

== Population ==
Historical population
| Year | Pop. | ±% p.a. |
|---|---|---|
| 1968 | 66 | — |
| 1975 | 61 | −1.12% |
| 1982 | 60 | −0.24% |
| 1990 | 59 | −0.21% |
| 1999 | 64 | +0.91% |
| 2007 | 51 | −2.80% |
| 2012 | 65 | +4.97% |
| 2017 | 41 | −8.80% |
| 2023 | 59 | +6.25% |
Source: INSEE

== See also ==
- Communes of the Côte-d'Or department
