= Martrois =

- Commune
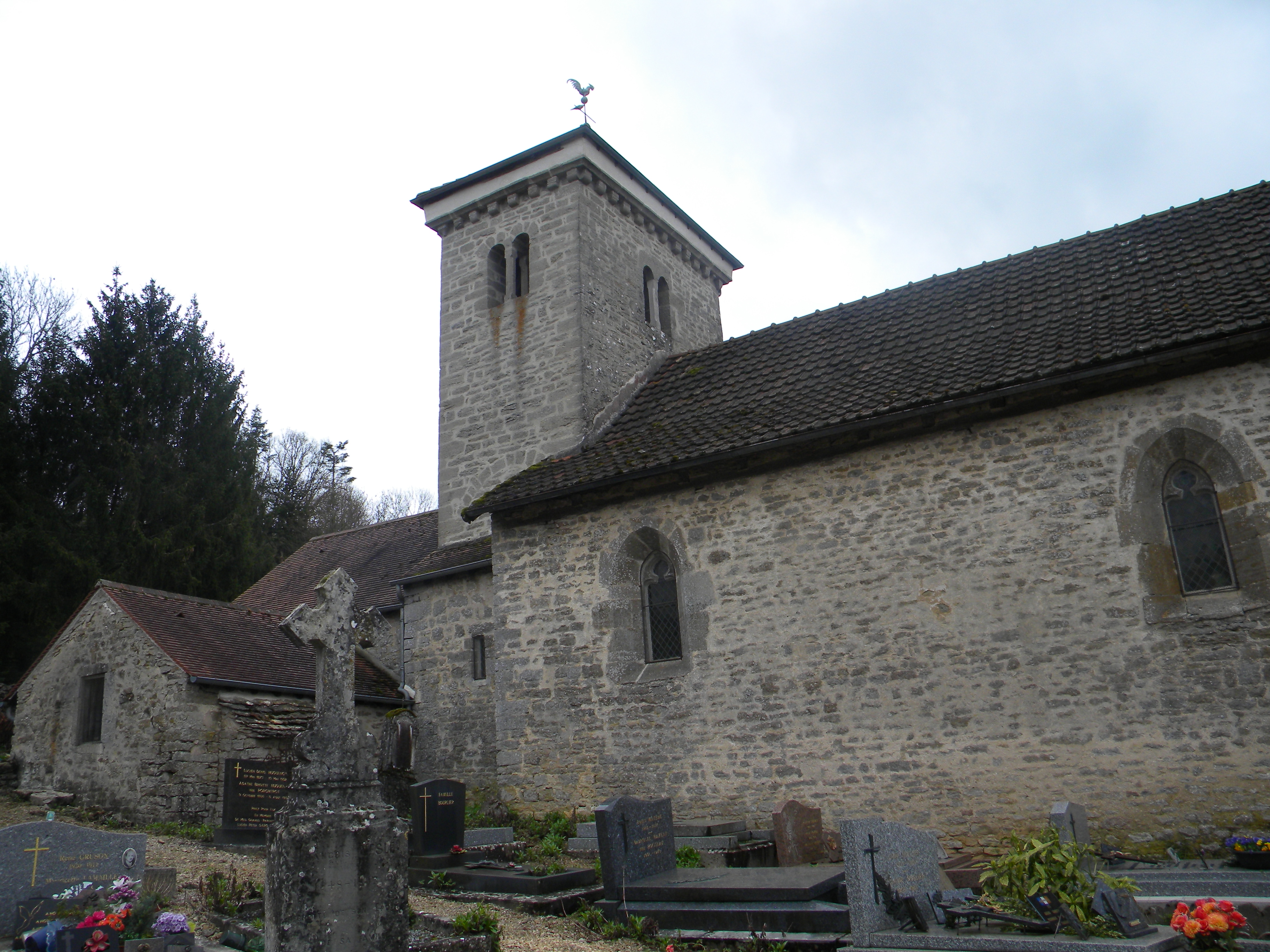
- The church in Martrois
- Location of Martrois
- Location within France Location within Bourgogne-Franche-Comté
- Coordinates: 47°18′41″N 4°32′16″E
- Country: France
- Region: Bourgogne-Franche-Comté
- Department: Côte-d'Or
- Arrondissement: Beaune
- Canton: Arnay-le-Duc

Government
  - Mayor (2020–2026): Geneviève Jondot
- Area^{1}: 7.59 km^{2} (2.93 sq mi)
- Elevation: 380 m (1,250 ft)
- Highest elevation: 547 m (1,795 ft)
- Lowest elevation: 352 m (1,155 ft)
- Population (2023): 60
  - Density: 7.9/km^{2} (20/sq mi)
- Time zone: UTC+01:00 (CET)
  - Summer (DST): UTC+02:00 (CEST)
- INSEE/Postal code: 21392 /21320
- ^{1} French Land Register data, which excludes lakes, ponds, glaciers > 1 km^{2} (0.386 sq mi or 247 acres) and river estuaries.

Martrois (French pronunciation: [maʁtʁwa]) is a commune in the Côte-d'Or department in eastern France.

== Population ==
Historical population
Year	Pop.	±% p.a.
1968	43	—
1975	45	+0.65%
1982	44	−0.32%
1990	60	+3.95%
1999	73	+2.20%
2007	57	−3.05%
2012	65	+2.66%
2017	62	−0.94%
2023	60	−0.55%
Source: INSEE

== See also ==
- Communes of the Côte-d'Or department
