= Bouhey =

- Commune
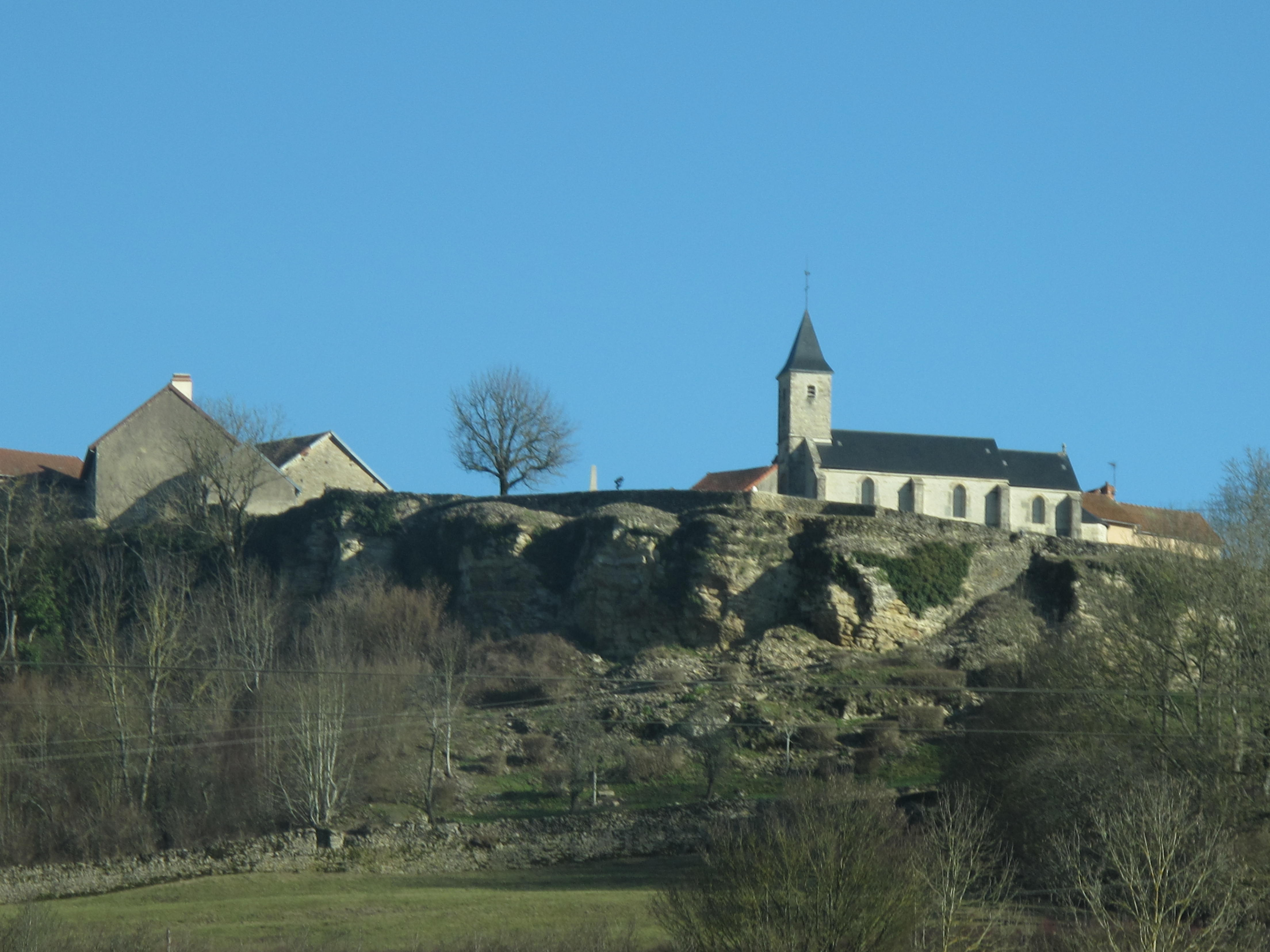
- A general view of Bouhey

- Coat of arms
- Location of Bouhey
- Location within France Location within Bourgogne-Franche-Comté
- Coordinates: 47°12′05″N 4°40′10″E
- Country: France
- Region: Bourgogne-Franche-Comté
- Department: Côte-d'Or
- Arrondissement: Beaune
- Canton: Arnay-le-Duc

Government
  - Mayor (2020–2026): Patrick Seguin
- Area^{1}: 7.64 km^{2} (2.95 sq mi)
- Elevation: 420 m (1,380 ft)
- Highest elevation: 522 m (1,713 ft)
- Lowest elevation: 337 m (1,106 ft)
- Population (2023): 53
  - Density: 6.9/km^{2} (18/sq mi)
- Time zone: UTC+01:00 (CET)
  - Summer (DST): UTC+02:00 (CEST)
- INSEE/Postal code: 21091 /21360
- ^{1} French Land Register data, which excludes lakes, ponds, glaciers > 1 km^{2} (0.386 sq mi or 247 acres) and river estuaries.

Bouhey (French pronunciation: [bu.ɛ]) is a commune in the Côte-d'Or department in eastern France.

== Population ==
Historical population
Year	Pop.	±% p.a.
1968	69	—
1975	53	−3.70%
1982	40	−3.94%
1990	44	+1.20%
1999	49	+1.20%
2007	41	−2.20%
2012	40	−0.49%
2017	38	−1.02%
2023	53	+5.70%
Source: INSEE

== See also ==
- Communes of the Côte-d'Or department
