= Diancey =

- Commune
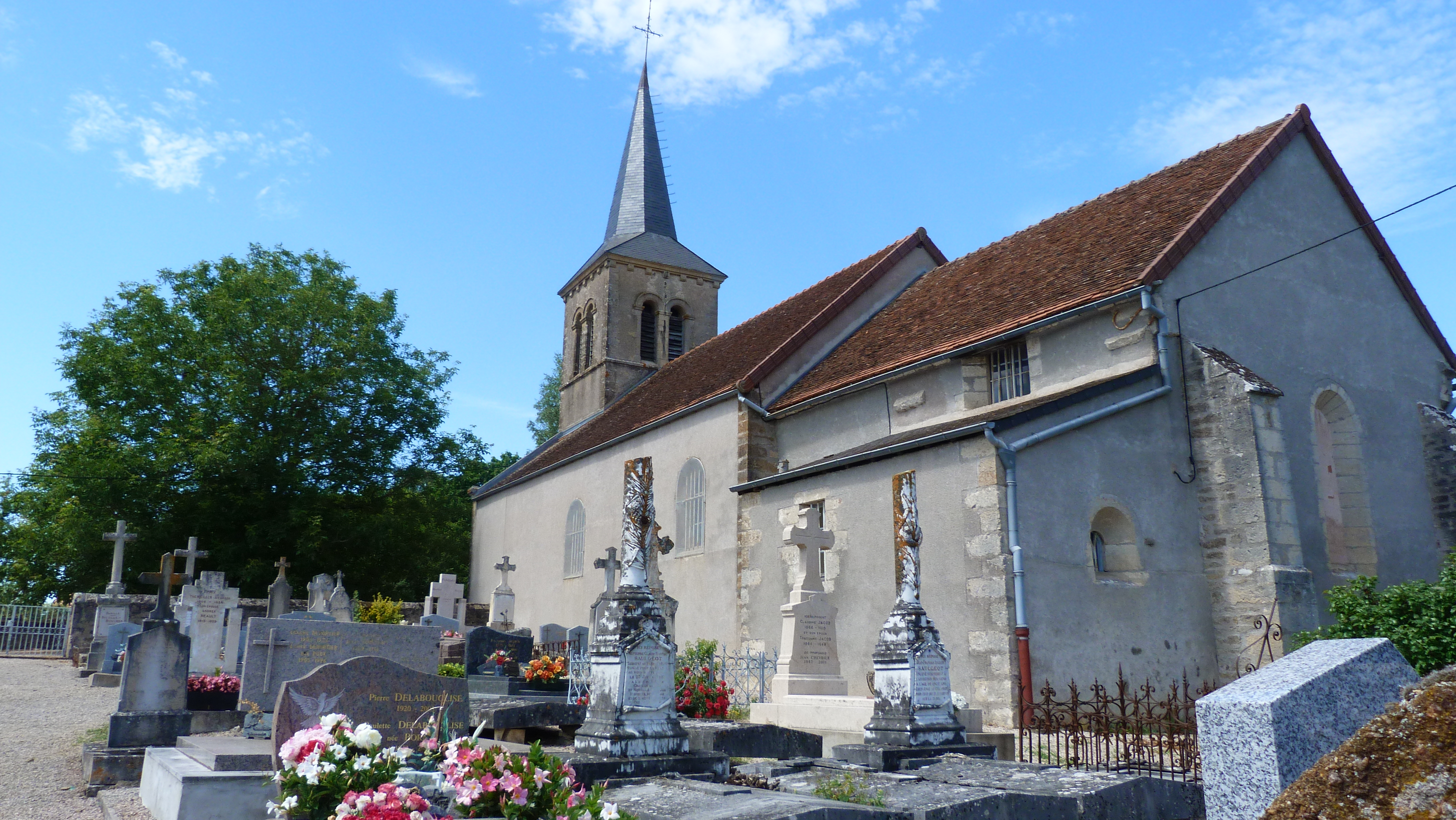
- The church in Diancey
- Location of Diancey
- Location within France Location within Bourgogne-Franche-Comté
- Coordinates: 47°10′57″N 4°21′48″E
- Country: France
- Region: Bourgogne-Franche-Comté
- Department: Côte-d'Or
- Arrondissement: Beaune
- Canton: Arnay-le-Duc

Government
  - Mayor (2020–2026): Jean-Marie Guyot
- Area^{1}: 9.96 km^{2} (3.85 sq mi)
- Elevation: 402 m (1,319 ft)
- Highest elevation: 428 m (1,404 ft)
- Lowest elevation: 340 m (1,120 ft)
- Population (2023): 99
  - Density: 9.9/km^{2} (26/sq mi)
- Time zone: UTC+01:00 (CET)
  - Summer (DST): UTC+02:00 (CEST)
- INSEE/Postal code: 21229 /21430
- ^{1} French Land Register data, which excludes lakes, ponds, glaciers > 1 km^{2} (0.386 sq mi or 247 acres) and river estuaries.

Diancey (French pronunciation: [djɑ̃sɛ]) is a commune in the Côte-d'Or department in eastern France.

== Population ==
Historical population
Year	Pop.	±% p.a.
1968	98	—
1975	85	−2.01%
1982	83	−0.34%
1990	72	−1.76%
1999	87	+2.12%
2007	88	+0.14%
2012	81	−1.64%
2017	84	+0.73%
2023	99	+2.78%
Source: INSEE

== See also ==
- Communes of the Côte-d'Or department
