= Vic-des-Prés =

- Commune
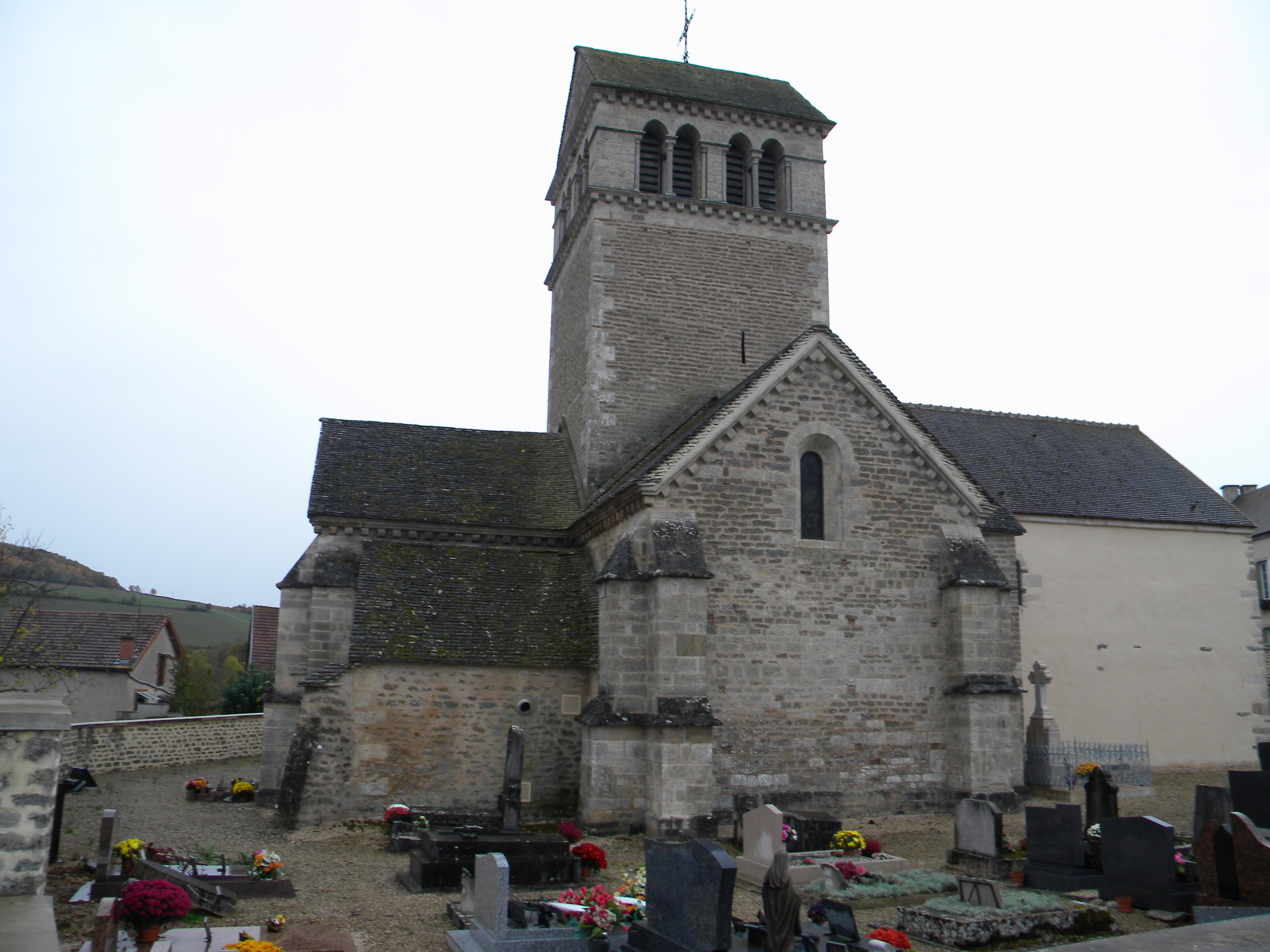
- The church in Vic-des-Prés

- Coat of arms
- Location of Vic-des-Prés
- Location within France Location within Bourgogne-Franche-Comté
- Coordinates: 47°06′18″N 4°38′34″E
- Country: France
- Region: Bourgogne-Franche-Comté
- Department: Côte-d'Or
- Arrondissement: Beaune
- Canton: Arnay-le-Duc

Government
  - Mayor (2020–2026): Bernard Petion
- Area^{1}: 8.95 km^{2} (3.46 sq mi)
- Elevation: 365 m (1,198 ft)
- Highest elevation: 530 m (1,740 ft)
- Lowest elevation: 354 m (1,161 ft)
- Population (2023): 107
  - Density: 12.0/km^{2} (31.0/sq mi)
- Time zone: UTC+01:00 (CET)
  - Summer (DST): UTC+02:00 (CEST)
- INSEE/Postal code: 21677 /21360
- ^{1} French Land Register data, which excludes lakes, ponds, glaciers > 1 km^{2} (0.386 sq mi or 247 acres) and river estuaries.

Vic-des-Prés is a commune in Côte-d'Or, a department in eastern France.

== Population ==
Historical population
Year	Pop.	±% p.a.
1968	104	—
1975	100	−0.56%
1982	86	−2.13%
1990	86	+0.00%
1999	77	−1.22%
2007	96	+2.80%
2012	113	+3.31%
2017	117	+0.70%
2023	107	−1.48%
Source: INSEE

== See also ==
- Communes of the Côte-d'Or department
