= Marcilly-Ogny =

- Commune
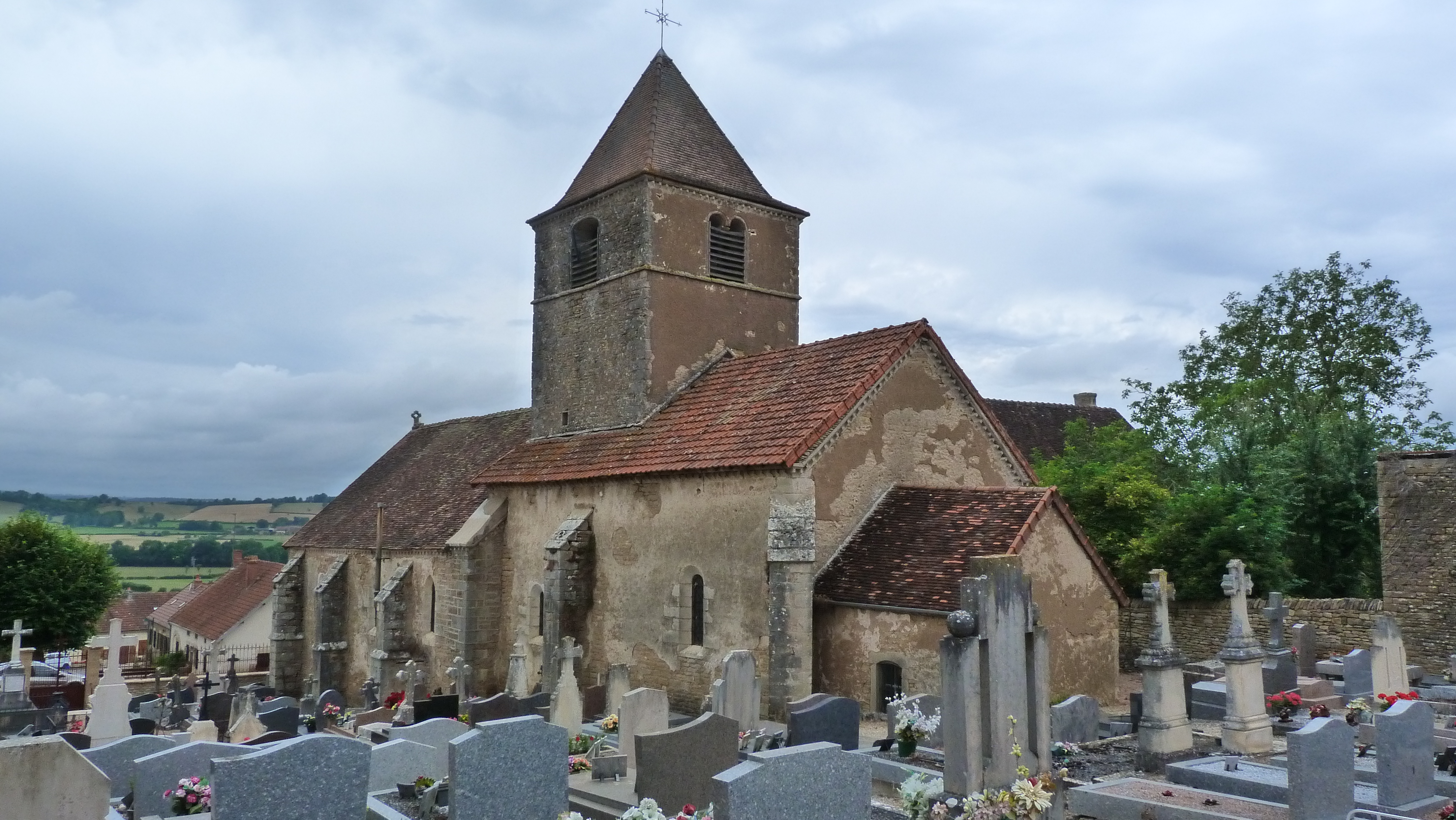
- The church in Marcilly-Ogny
- Location of Marcilly-Ogny
- Location within France Location within Bourgogne-Franche-Comté
- Coordinates: 47°15′11″N 4°24′23″E
- Country: France
- Region: Bourgogne-Franche-Comté
- Department: Côte-d'Or
- Arrondissement: Beaune
- Canton: Arnay-le-Duc

Government
  - Mayor (2020–2026): François Champrenault
- Area^{1}: 17.87 km^{2} (6.90 sq mi)
- Elevation: 440 m (1,440 ft)
- Highest elevation: 521 m (1,709 ft)
- Lowest elevation: 370 m (1,210 ft)
- Population (2023): 197
  - Density: 11.0/km^{2} (28.6/sq mi)
- Time zone: UTC+01:00 (CET)
  - Summer (DST): UTC+02:00 (CEST)
- INSEE/Postal code: 21382 /21320
- ^{1} French Land Register data, which excludes lakes, ponds, glaciers > 1 km^{2} (0.386 sq mi or 247 acres) and river estuaries.

Marcilly-Ogny (French pronunciation: [maʁsiji ɔɲi]) is a commune in the Côte-d'Or department in eastern France.

== Population ==
Historical population
Year	Pop.	±% p.a.
1968	268	—
1975	191	−4.72%
1982	171	−1.57%
1990	173	+0.15%
1999	189	+0.99%
2007	199	+0.65%
2012	199	+0.00%
2017	195	−0.41%
2023	197	+0.17%
Source: INSEE

== See also ==
- Communes of the Côte-d'Or department
