= Écutigny =

- Commune
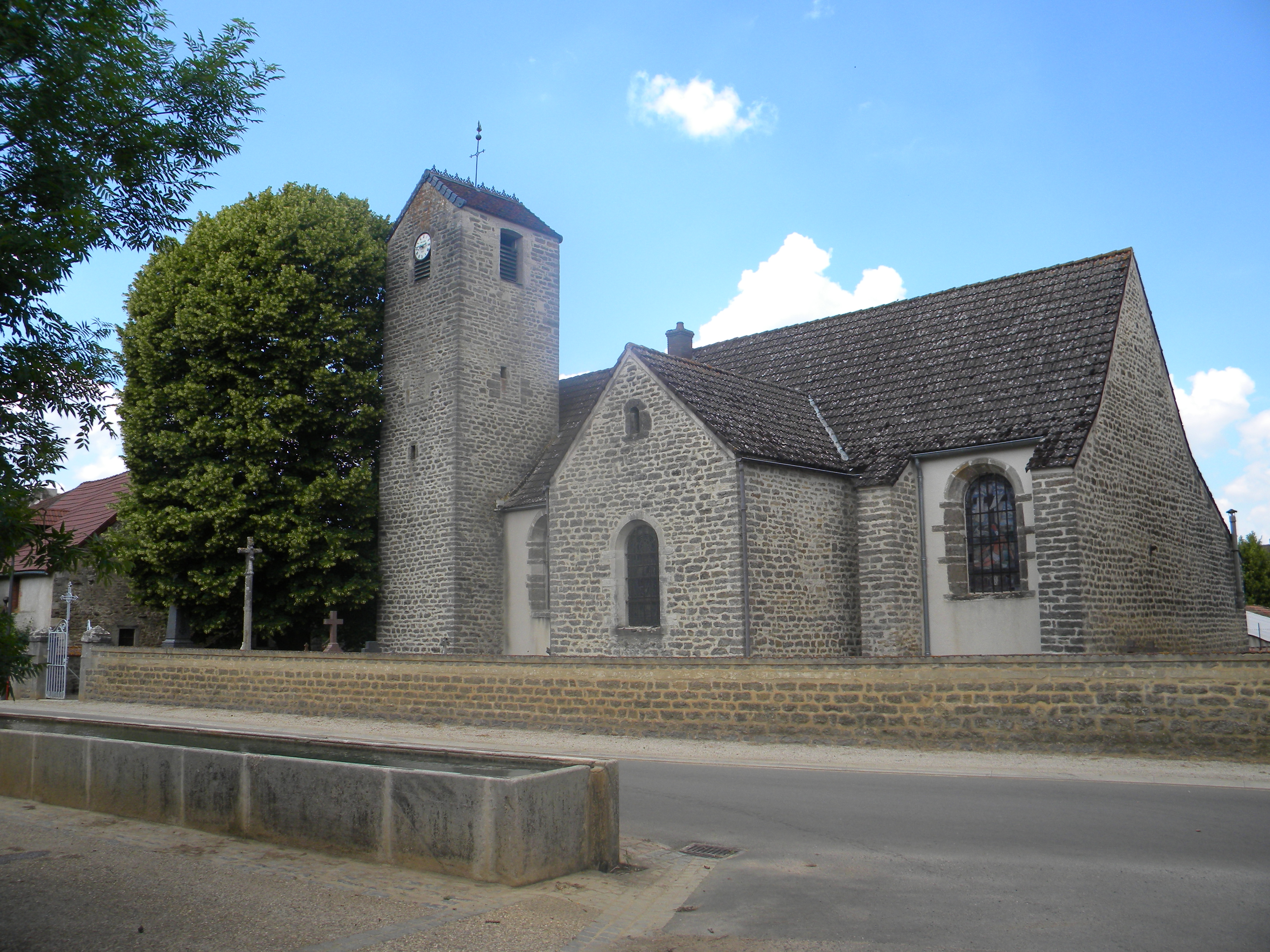
- The church in Écutigny
- Location of Écutigny
- Location within France Location within Bourgogne-Franche-Comté
- Coordinates: 47°05′06″N 4°37′22″E
- Country: France
- Region: Bourgogne-Franche-Comté
- Department: Côte-d'Or
- Arrondissement: Beaune
- Canton: Arnay-le-Duc

Government
  - Mayor (2024–2026): Laurent Cousin
- Area^{1}: 5.69 km^{2} (2.20 sq mi)
- Highest elevation: 475 m (1,558 ft)
- Lowest elevation: 382 m (1,253 ft)
- Population (2023): 78
  - Density: 14/km^{2} (36/sq mi)
- Time zone: UTC+01:00 (CET)
  - Summer (DST): UTC+02:00 (CEST)
- INSEE/Postal code: 21243 /21360
- ^{1} French Land Register data, which excludes lakes, ponds, glaciers > 1 km^{2} (0.386 sq mi or 247 acres) and river estuaries.

Écutigny (French pronunciation: [ekytiɲi]) is a commune in the Côte-d'Or department the region of Bourgogne-Franche-Comté in eastern France.

== Population ==
Historical population
Year	Pop.	±% p.a.
1968	108	—
1975	99	−1.24%
1982	81	−2.83%
1990	85	+0.60%
1999	78	−0.95%
2007	100	+3.15%
2012	100	+0.00%
2017	79	−4.61%
2023	78	−0.21%
Source: INSEE

== See also ==
- Communes of the Côte-d'Or department
