= Jouey =

- Commune
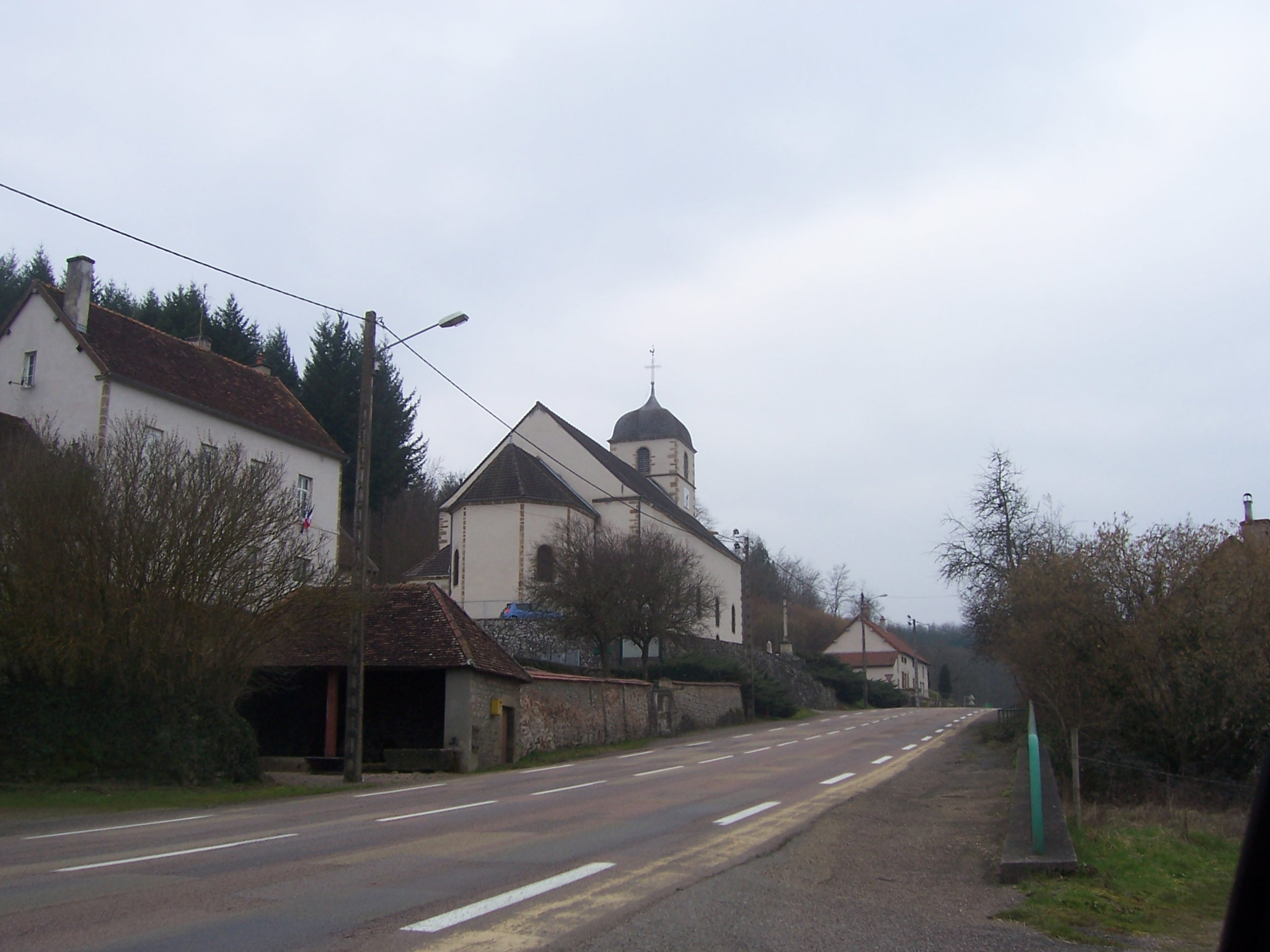
- The church in Jouey

- Coat of arms
- Location of Jouey
- Location within France Location within Bourgogne-Franche-Comté
- Coordinates: 47°09′15″N 4°26′52″E
- Country: France
- Region: Bourgogne-Franche-Comté
- Department: Côte-d'Or
- Arrondissement: Beaune
- Canton: Arnay-le-Duc
- Intercommunality: Pays Arnay Liernais

Government
  - Mayor (2020–2026): Christine Buisson
- Area^{1}: 24.26 km^{2} (9.37 sq mi)
- Highest elevation: 436 m (1,430 ft)
- Lowest elevation: 324 m (1,063 ft)
- Population (2023): 188
  - Density: 7.75/km^{2} (20.1/sq mi)
- Time zone: UTC+01:00 (CET)
  - Summer (DST): UTC+02:00 (CEST)
- INSEE/Postal code: 21325 /21230
- ^{1} French Land Register data, which excludes lakes, ponds, glaciers > 1 km^{2} (0.386 sq mi or 247 acres) and river estuaries.

Jouey (French pronunciation: [ʒwɛ]) is a commune in the Côte-d'Or department in eastern France.

== Population ==
Historical population
Year	Pop.	±% p.a.
1968	324	—
1975	277	−2.21%
1982	232	−2.50%
1990	226	−0.33%
1999	204	−1.13%
2007	200	−0.25%
2012	196	−0.40%
2017	185	−1.15%
2023	188	+0.27%
Source: INSEE

== See also ==
- Communes of the Côte-d'Or department
