= Sussey =

- Commune
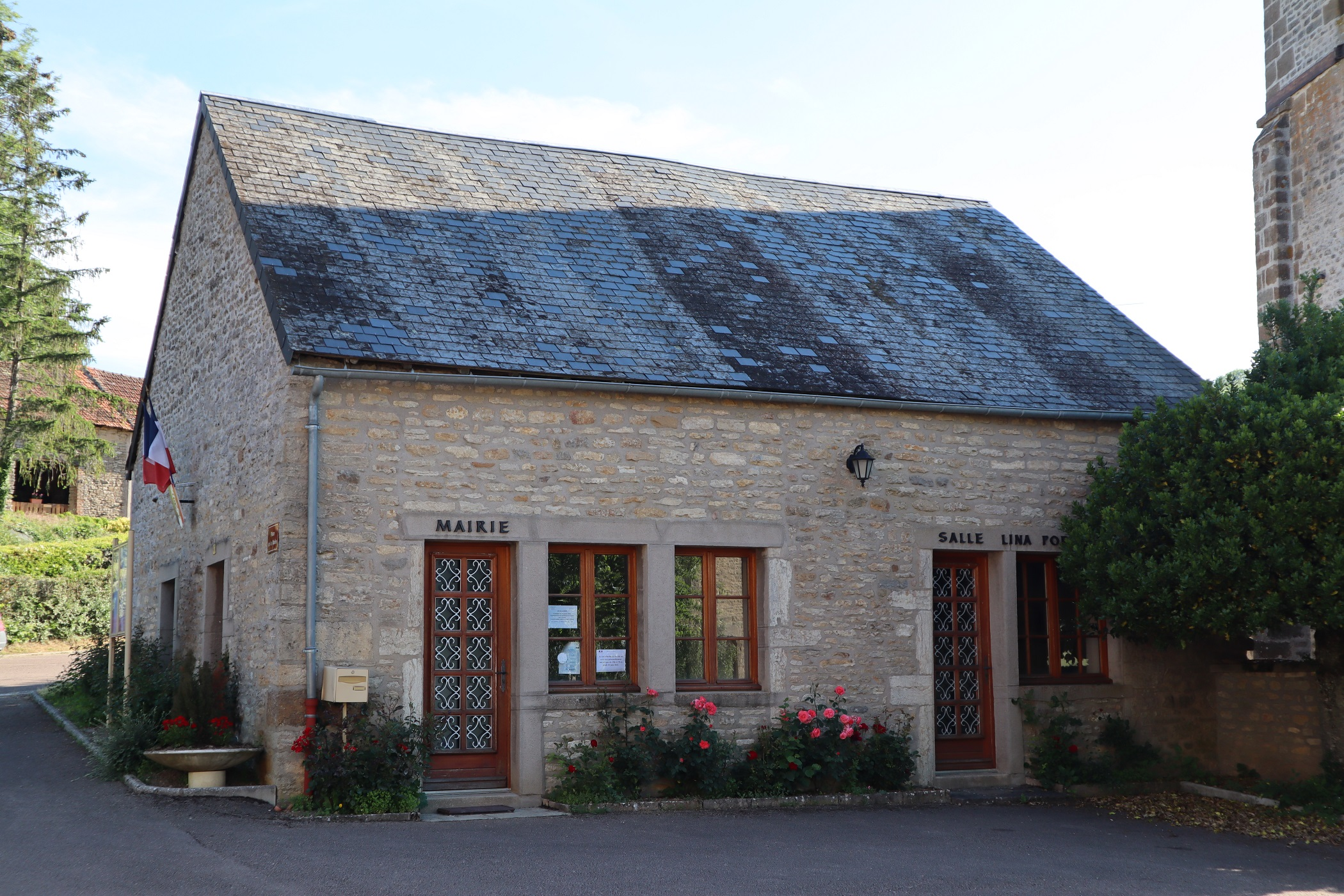
- Town hall

- Coat of arms
- Location of Sussey
- Location within France Location within Bourgogne-Franche-Comté
- Coordinates: 47°13′27″N 4°21′50″E
- Country: France
- Region: Bourgogne-Franche-Comté
- Department: Côte-d'Or
- Arrondissement: Beaune
- Canton: Arnay-le-Duc

Government
  - Mayor (2020–2026): Gérard Sagetat
- Area^{1}: 21.11 km^{2} (8.15 sq mi)
- Elevation: 448 m (1,470 ft)
- Highest elevation: 526 m (1,726 ft)
- Lowest elevation: 365 m (1,198 ft)
- Population (2023): 247
  - Density: 11.7/km^{2} (30.3/sq mi)
- Time zone: UTC+01:00 (CET)
  - Summer (DST): UTC+02:00 (CEST)
- INSEE/Postal code: 21615 /21430
- ^{1} French Land Register data, which excludes lakes, ponds, glaciers > 1 km^{2} (0.386 sq mi or 247 acres) and river estuaries.

Sussey (French pronunciation: [sysɛ]) is a commune in the Côte-d'Or department in eastern France.

== Population ==
Historical population
Year	Pop.	±% p.a.
1968	359	—
1975	336	−0.94%
1982	315	−0.92%
1990	250	−2.85%
1999	239	−0.50%
2007	244	+0.26%
2012	269	+1.97%
2017	248	−1.61%
2023	247	−0.07%
Source: INSEE

== See also ==
- Communes of the Côte-d'Or department
