= Cussy-le-Châtel =

- Commune
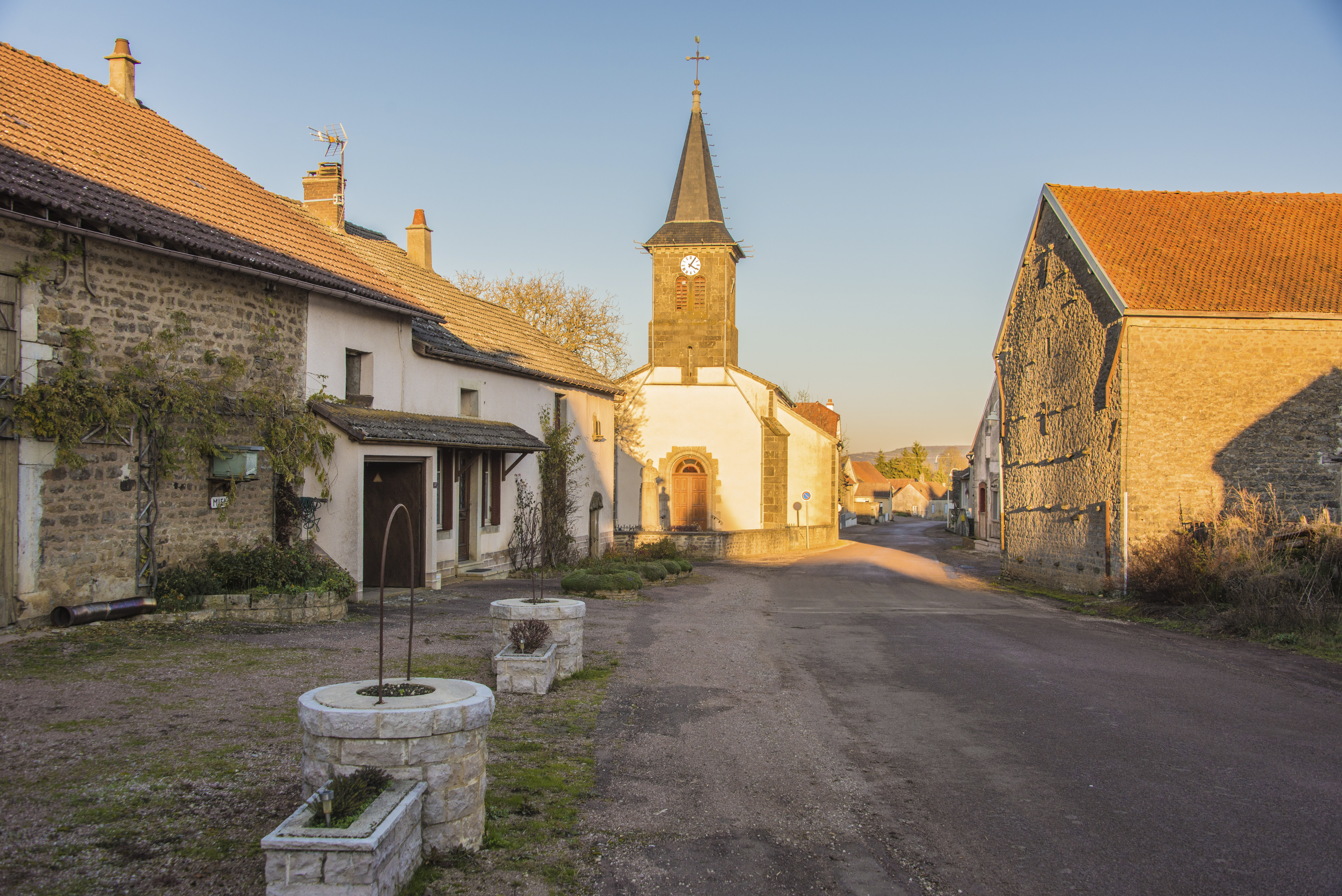
- The church and surroundings in Cussy-le-Châtel
- Location of Cussy-le-Châtel
- Location within France Location within Bourgogne-Franche-Comté
- Coordinates: 47°09′56″N 4°35′11″E
- Country: France
- Region: Bourgogne-Franche-Comté
- Department: Côte-d'Or
- Arrondissement: Beaune
- Canton: Arnay-le-Duc
- Intercommunality: Pays Arnay Liernais

Government
  - Mayor (2020–2026): Roseline De Almeida Araujo
- Area^{1}: 7.23 km^{2} (2.79 sq mi)
- Highest elevation: 459 m (1,506 ft)
- Lowest elevation: 400 m (1,300 ft)
- Population (2023): 124
  - Density: 17.2/km^{2} (44.4/sq mi)
- Time zone: UTC+01:00 (CET)
  - Summer (DST): UTC+02:00 (CEST)
- INSEE/Postal code: 21222 /21230
- ^{1} French Land Register data, which excludes lakes, ponds, glaciers > 1 km^{2} (0.386 sq mi or 247 acres) and river estuaries.

Cussy-le-Châtel (French pronunciation: [kysi lə ʃɑtɛl]) is a commune in the Côte-d'Or department in eastern France.

== Population ==
Historical population
Year	Pop.	±% p.a.
1968	172	—
1975	149	−2.03%
1982	123	−2.70%
1990	121	−0.20%
1999	100	−2.10%
2007	108	+0.97%
2012	117	+1.61%
2017	109	−1.41%
2023	124	+2.17%
Source: INSEE

== See also ==
- Communes of the Côte-d'Or department
