= Châtellenot =

- Commune
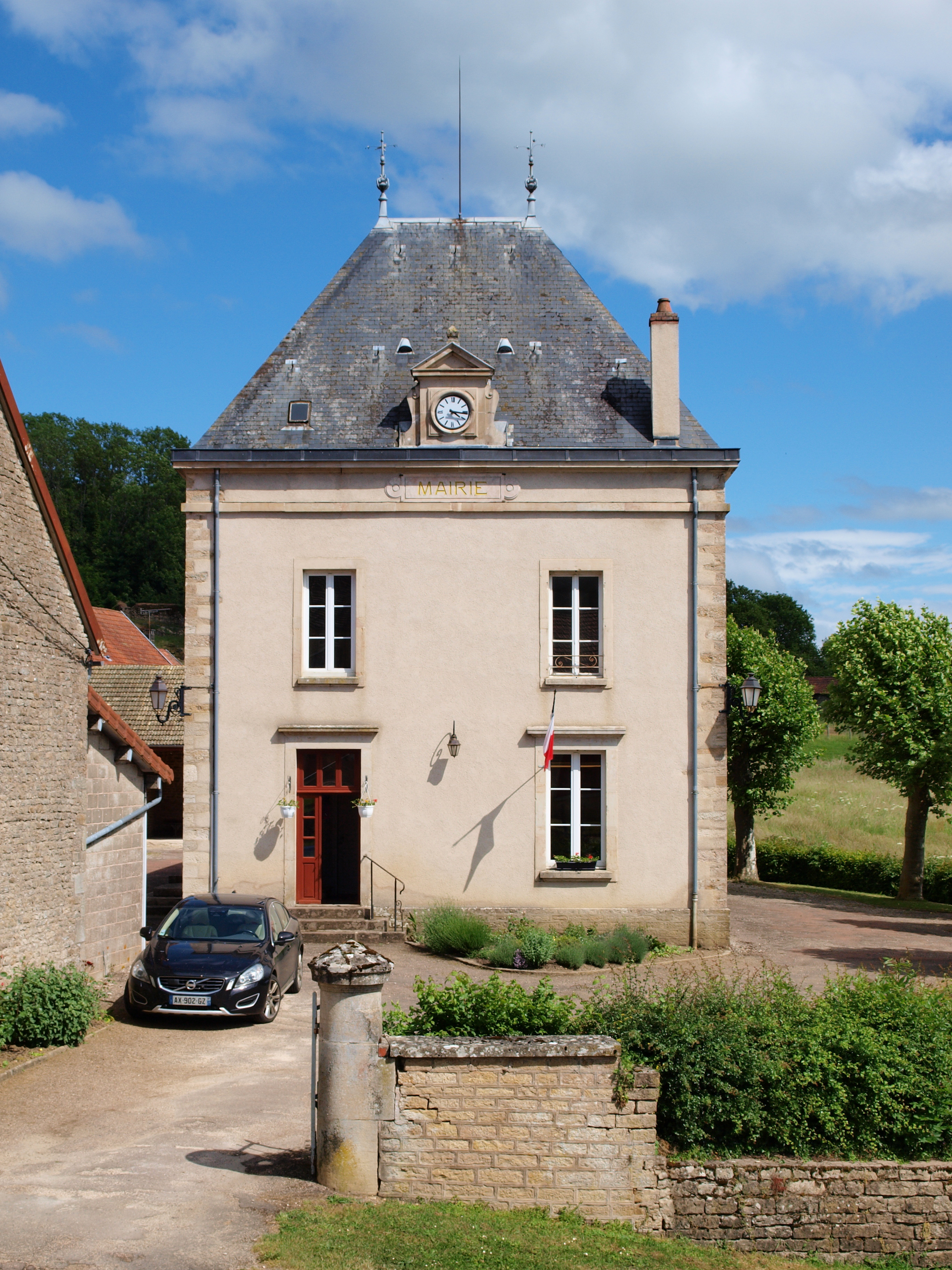
- The town hall in Châtellenot
- Location of Châtellenot
- Location within France Location within Bourgogne-Franche-Comté
- Coordinates: 47°14′13″N 4°29′24″E
- Country: France
- Region: Bourgogne-Franche-Comté
- Department: Côte-d'Or
- Arrondissement: Beaune
- Canton: Arnay-le-Duc

Government
  - Mayor (2020–2026): Chantal Tainturier
- Area^{1}: 11.52 km^{2} (4.45 sq mi)
- Elevation: 570 m (1,870 ft)
- Highest elevation: 527 m (1,729 ft)
- Lowest elevation: 382 m (1,253 ft)
- Population (2023): 167
  - Density: 14.5/km^{2} (37.5/sq mi)
- Time zone: UTC+01:00 (CET)
  - Summer (DST): UTC+02:00 (CEST)
- INSEE/Postal code: 21153 /21320
- ^{1} French Land Register data, which excludes lakes, ponds, glaciers > 1 km^{2} (0.386 sq mi or 247 acres) and river estuaries.

Châtellenot (French pronunciation: [ʃatɛlno]) is a commune in the Côte-d'Or department in eastern France.

== Population ==
Historical population
Year	Pop.	±% p.a.
1968	163	—
1975	158	−0.44%
1982	144	−1.32%
1990	148	+0.34%
1999	158	+0.73%
2007	149	−0.73%
2012	144	−0.68%
2017	151	+0.95%
2023	167	+1.69%
Source: INSEE

== See also ==
- Communes of the Côte-d'Or department
