= Mimeure =

- Commune
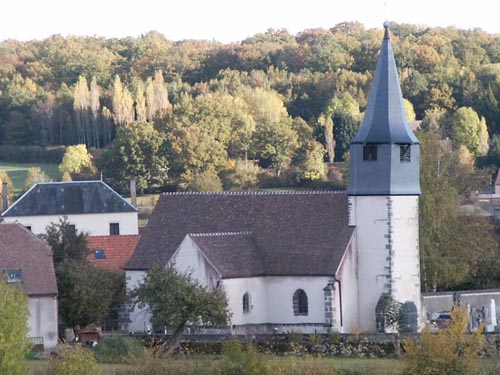
- The church in the hamlet of Solonge

- Coat of arms
- Location of Mimeure
- Location within France Location within Bourgogne-Franche-Comté
- Coordinates: 47°09′05″N 4°29′51″E
- Country: France
- Region: Bourgogne-Franche-Comté
- Department: Côte-d'Or
- Arrondissement: Beaune
- Canton: Arnay-le-Duc
- Intercommunality: Pays Arnay Liernais

Government
  - Mayor (2020–2026): Marie-Reine Maître
- Area^{1}: 13.83 km^{2} (5.34 sq mi)
- Highest elevation: 437 m (1,434 ft)
- Lowest elevation: 335 m (1,099 ft)
- Population (2023): 320
  - Density: 23/km^{2} (60/sq mi)
- Time zone: UTC+01:00 (CET)
  - Summer (DST): UTC+02:00 (CEST)
- INSEE/Postal code: 21414 /21230
- ^{1} French Land Register data, which excludes lakes, ponds, glaciers > 1 km^{2} (0.386 sq mi or 247 acres) and river estuaries.

Mimeure (French pronunciation: [mimœʁ]) is a commune in the Côte-d'Or department in eastern France.

== Population ==
Historical population
| Year | Pop. | ±% p.a. |
|---|---|---|
| 1968 | 312 | — |
| 1975 | 227 | −4.44% |
| 1982 | 218 | −0.58% |
| 1990 | 199 | −1.13% |
| 1999 | 216 | +0.91% |
| 2007 | 261 | +2.39% |
| 2012 | 299 | +2.76% |
| 2017 | 309 | +0.66% |
| 2023 | 320 | +0.58% |
Source: INSEE

== See also ==
- Communes of the Côte-d'Or department
