= Painblanc =

- Commune
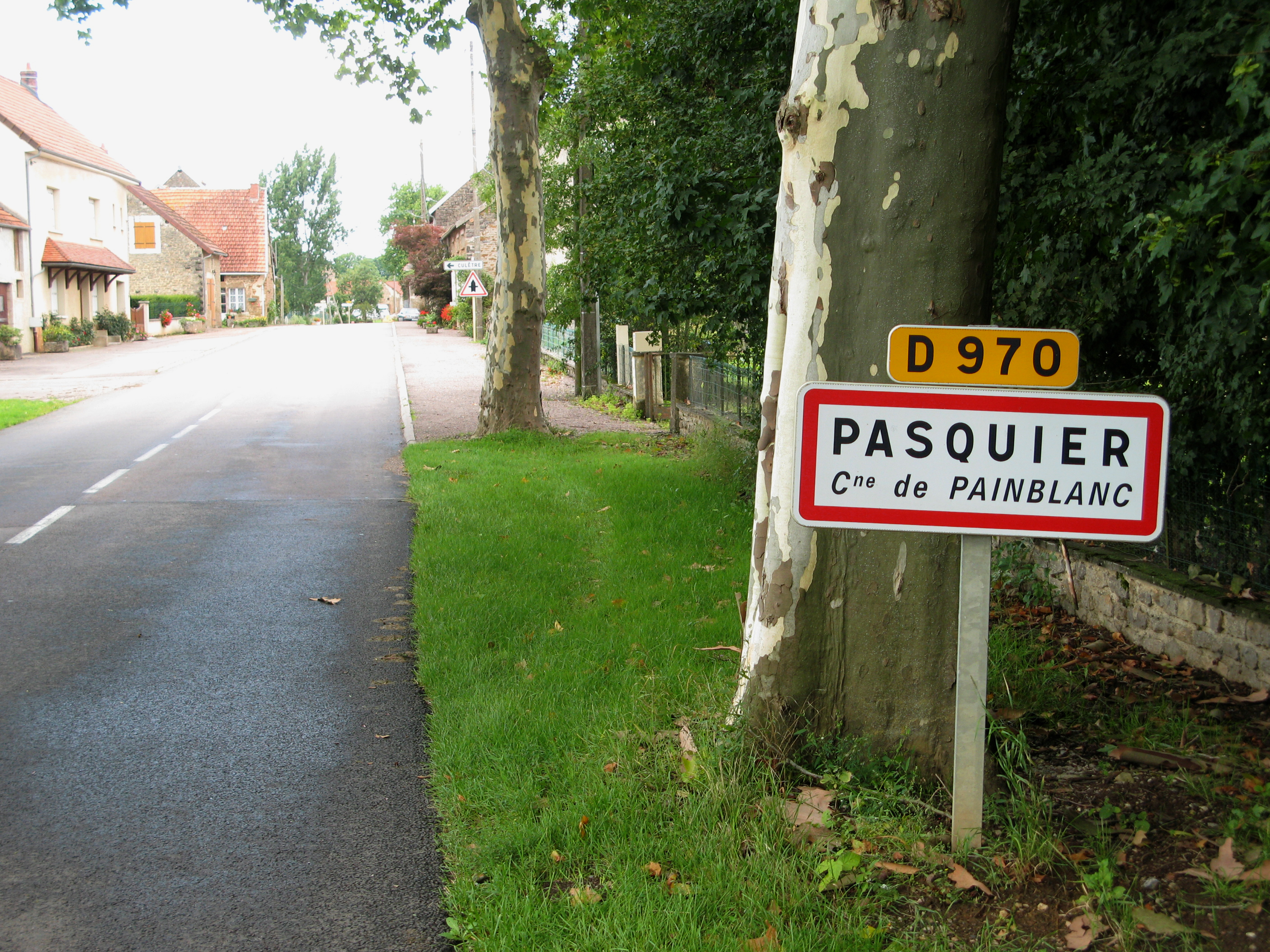
- The road into Painblanc
- Location of Painblanc
- Location within France Location within Bourgogne-Franche-Comté
- Coordinates: 47°08′52″N 4°37′41″E
- Country: France
- Region: Bourgogne-Franche-Comté
- Department: Côte-d'Or
- Arrondissement: Beaune
- Canton: Arnay-le-Duc

Government
  - Mayor (2020–2026): Jean Luc Barbier
- Area^{1}: 9.15 km^{2} (3.53 sq mi)
- Elevation: 410 m (1,350 ft)
- Highest elevation: 557 m (1,827 ft)
- Lowest elevation: 384 m (1,260 ft)
- Population (2023): 171
  - Density: 18.7/km^{2} (48.4/sq mi)
- Time zone: UTC+01:00 (CET)
  - Summer (DST): UTC+02:00 (CEST)
- INSEE/Postal code: 21476 /21360
- ^{1} French Land Register data, which excludes lakes, ponds, glaciers > 1 km^{2} (0.386 sq mi or 247 acres) and river estuaries.

Painblanc (French pronunciation: [pɛ̃blɑ̃]) is a commune in the Côte-d'Or department in eastern France.

== Population ==
Historical population
Year	Pop.	±% p.a.
1968	211	—
1975	189	−1.56%
1982	197	+0.59%
1990	169	−1.90%
1999	142	−1.92%
2007	155	+1.10%
2012	157	+0.26%
2017	161	+0.50%
2023	171	+1.01%
Source: INSEE

== See also ==
- Communes of the Côte-d'Or department
