= Chazilly =

- Commune
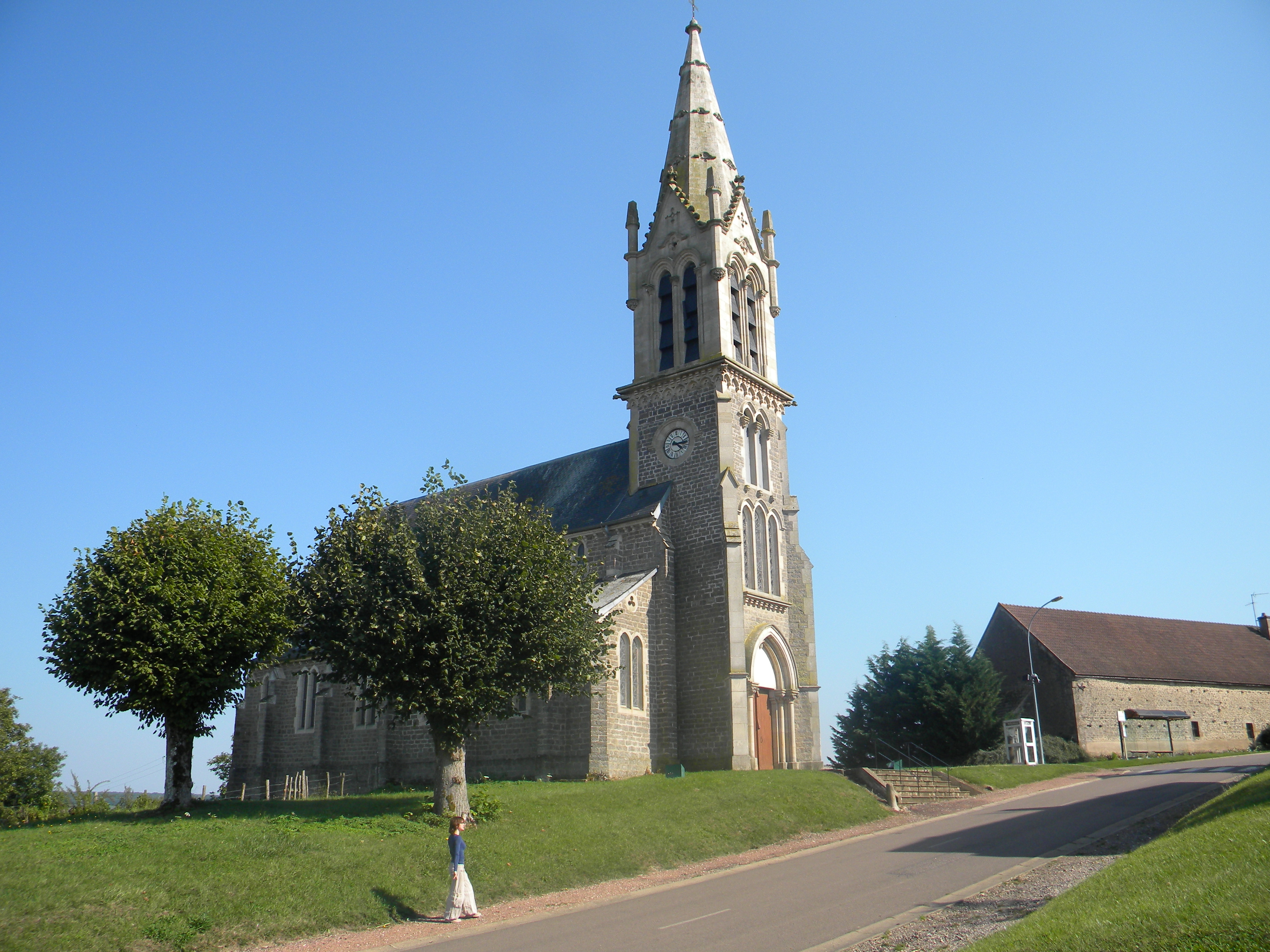
- The church in Chazilly

- Coat of arms
- Location of Chazilly
- Location within France Location within Bourgogne-Franche-Comté
- Coordinates: 47°11′03″N 4°34′59″E
- Country: France
- Region: Bourgogne-Franche-Comté
- Department: Côte-d'Or
- Arrondissement: Beaune
- Canton: Arnay-le-Duc

Government
  - Mayor (2020–2026): Isabelle Cognard
- Area^{1}: 8.79 km^{2} (3.39 sq mi)
- Elevation: 420 m (1,380 ft)
- Highest elevation: 459 m (1,506 ft)
- Lowest elevation: 379 m (1,243 ft)
- Population (2023): 151
  - Density: 17.2/km^{2} (44.5/sq mi)
- Time zone: UTC+01:00 (CET)
  - Summer (DST): UTC+02:00 (CEST)
- INSEE/Postal code: 21164 /21320
- ^{1} French Land Register data, which excludes lakes, ponds, glaciers > 1 km^{2} (0.386 sq mi or 247 acres) and river estuaries.

Chazilly (French pronunciation: [ʃaziji]) is a commune in the Côte-d'Or department in eastern France.

== Population ==
Historical population
| Year | Pop. | ±% p.a. |
|---|---|---|
| 1968 | 125 | — |
| 1975 | 141 | +1.74% |
| 1982 | 119 | −2.39% |
| 1990 | 122 | +0.31% |
| 1999 | 114 | −0.75% |
| 2007 | 129 | +1.56% |
| 2012 | 136 | +1.06% |
| 2017 | 139 | +0.44% |
| 2023 | 151 | +1.39% |
Source: INSEE

== See also ==
- Communes of the Côte-d'Or department
