= Voudenay =

- Commune
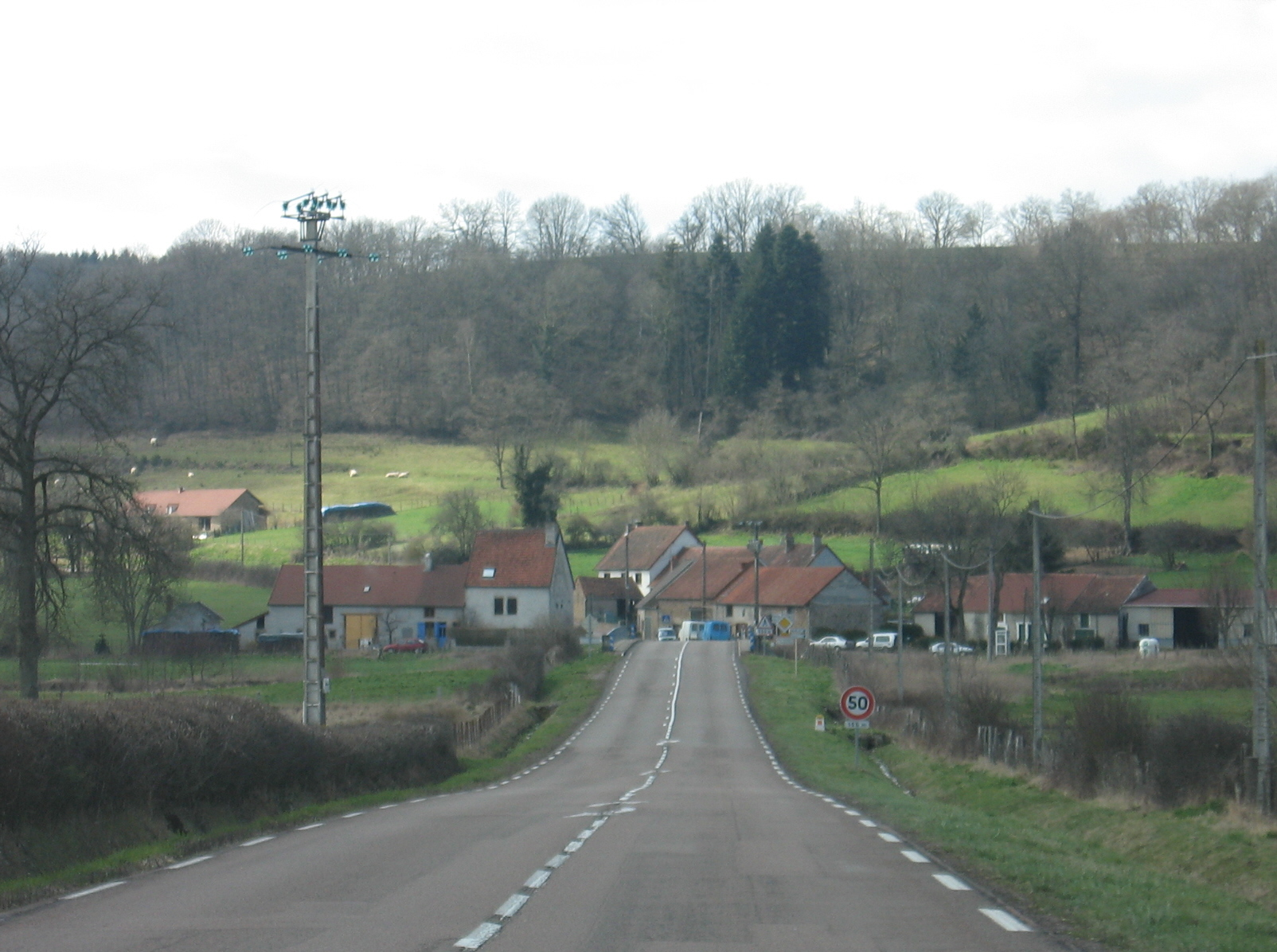
- Voudenay-le-Château
- Location of Voudenay
- Location within France Location within Bourgogne-Franche-Comté
- Coordinates: 47°05′28″N 4°23′09″E
- Country: France
- Region: Bourgogne-Franche-Comté
- Department: Côte-d'Or
- Arrondissement: Beaune
- Canton: Arnay-le-Duc
- Intercommunality: Pays Arnay Liernais

Government
  - Mayor (2020–2026): Joëlle Boëz
- Area^{1}: 21.45 km^{2} (8.28 sq mi)
- Highest elevation: 436 m (1,430 ft)
- Lowest elevation: 307 m (1,007 ft)
- Population (2023): 194
  - Density: 9.04/km^{2} (23.4/sq mi)
- Time zone: UTC+01:00 (CET)
  - Summer (DST): UTC+02:00 (CEST)
- INSEE/Postal code: 21715 /21230
- ^{1} French Land Register data, which excludes lakes, ponds, glaciers > 1 km^{2} (0.386 sq mi or 247 acres) and river estuaries.

Voudenay (French pronunciation: [vudnɛ]) is a commune in the Côte-d'Or department in eastern France.

== Population ==
Historical population
Year	Pop.	±% p.a.
1968	311	—
1975	273	−1.84%
1982	243	−1.65%
1990	242	−0.05%
1999	222	−0.95%
2007	197	−1.48%
2012	189	−0.83%
2017	190	+0.11%
2023	194	+0.35%
Source: INSEE

== See also ==
- Communes of the Côte-d'Or department
