= Longecourt-lès-Culêtre =

- Commune
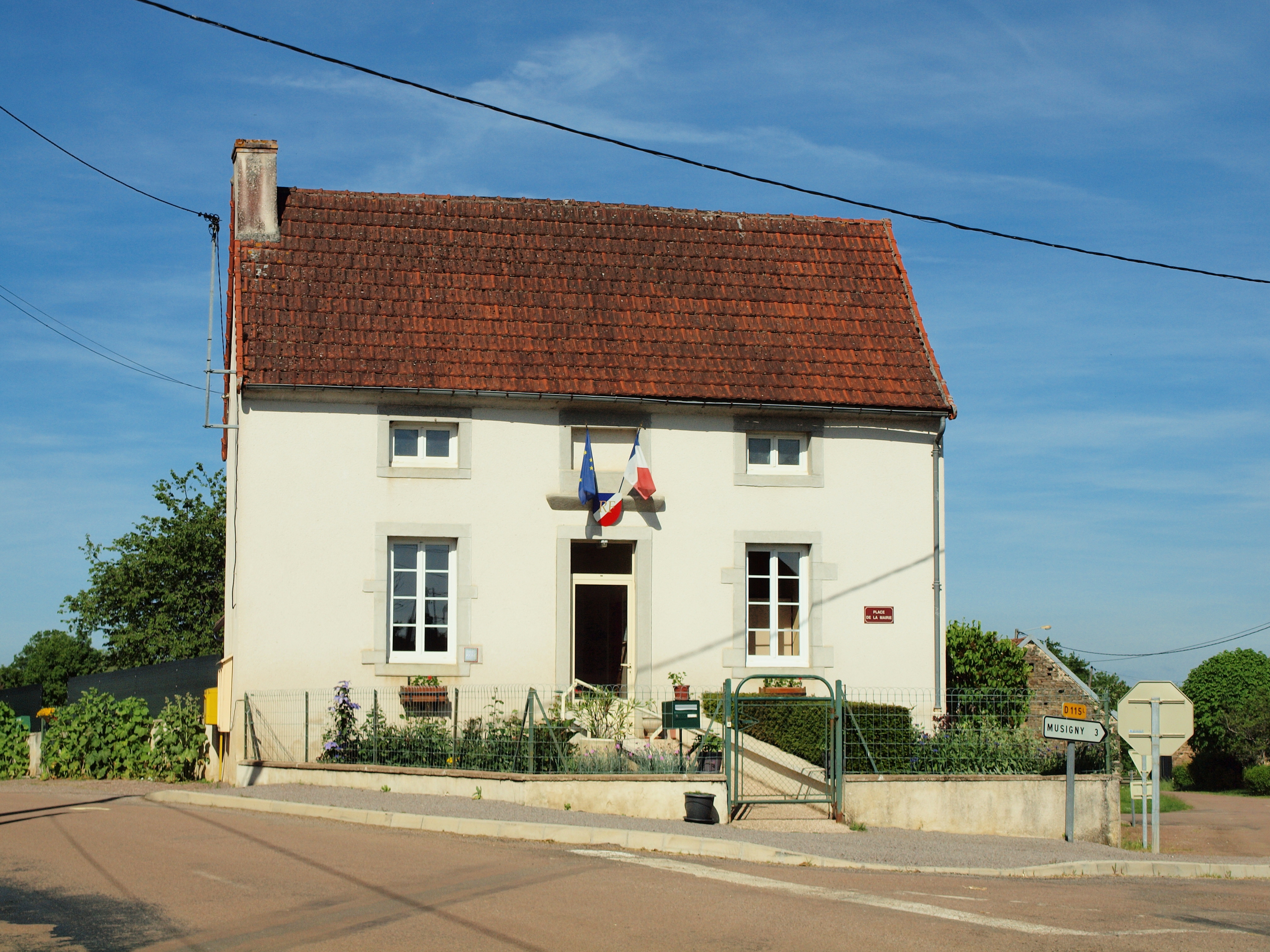
- The town hall in Longecourt-lès-Culêtre
- Location of Longecourt-lès-Culêtre
- Location within France Location within Bourgogne-Franche-Comté
- Coordinates: 47°09′35″N 4°33′13″E
- Country: France
- Region: Bourgogne-Franche-Comté
- Department: Côte-d'Or
- Arrondissement: Beaune
- Canton: Arnay-le-Duc
- Intercommunality: Pays Arnay Liernais

Government
  - Mayor (2020–2026): Gérard Brouillon
- Area^{1}: 4.43 km^{2} (1.71 sq mi)
- Highest elevation: 458 m (1,503 ft)
- Lowest elevation: 390 m (1,280 ft)
- Population (2023): 55
  - Density: 12/km^{2} (32/sq mi)
- Time zone: UTC+01:00 (CET)
  - Summer (DST): UTC+02:00 (CEST)
- INSEE/Postal code: 21354 /21230
- ^{1} French Land Register data, which excludes lakes, ponds, glaciers > 1 km^{2} (0.386 sq mi or 247 acres) and river estuaries.

Longecourt-lès-Culêtre (French pronunciation: [lɔ̃ʒkuʁ lɛ kylɛtʁ], literally Longecourt near Culêtre) is a commune in the Côte-d'Or department in eastern France.

== Population ==
Historical population
Year	Pop.	±% p.a.
1968	86	—
1975	59	−5.24%
1982	63	+0.94%
1990	57	−1.24%
1999	54	−0.60%
2007	50	−0.96%
2012	46	−1.65%
2017	50	+1.68%
2023	55	+1.60%
Source: INSEE

== See also ==
- Communes of the Côte-d'Or department
