= Bellenot-sous-Pouilly =

- Commune
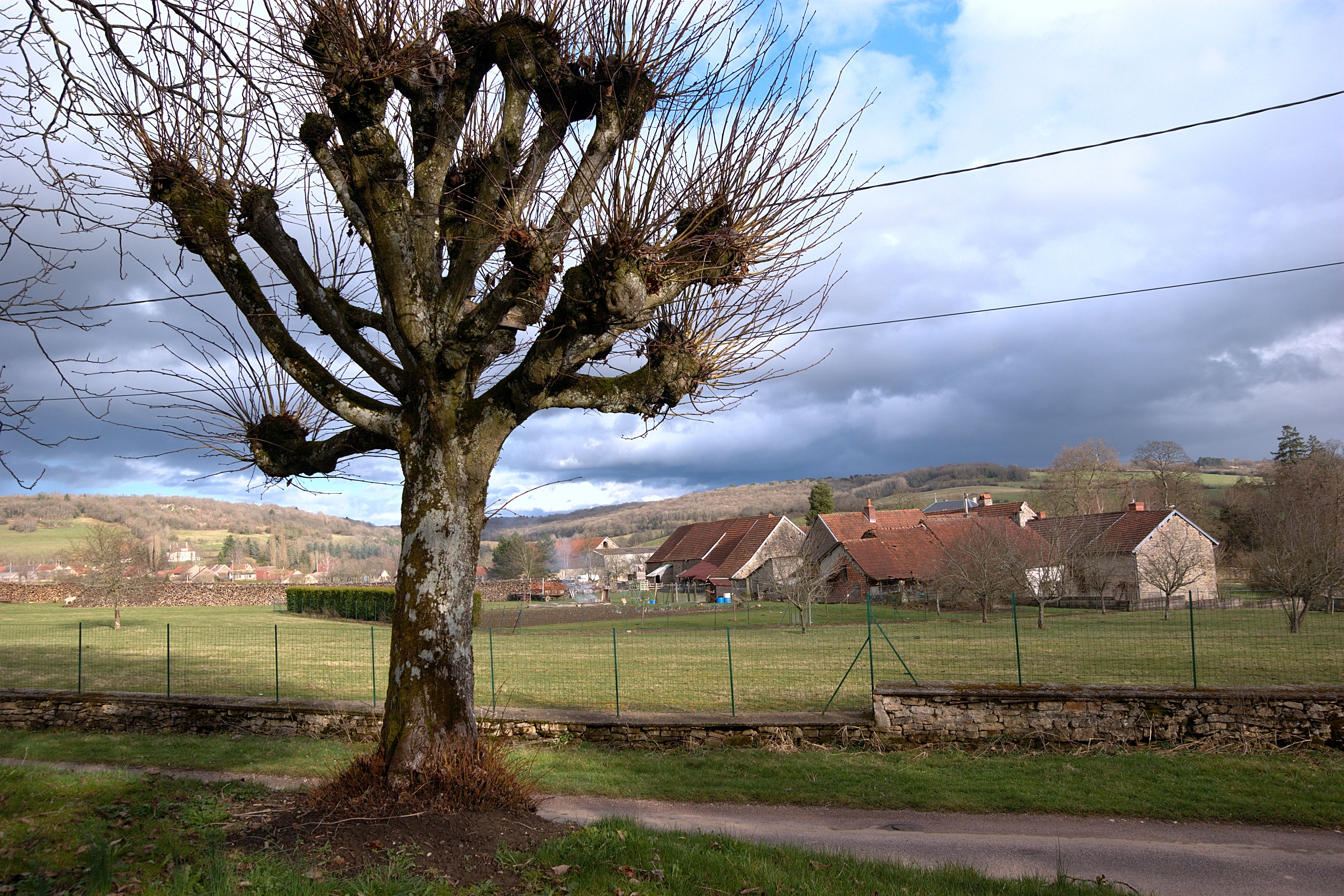
- A general view of Bellenot-sous-Pouilly

- Coat of arms
- Location of Bellenot-sous-Pouilly
- Location within France Location within Bourgogne-Franche-Comté
- Coordinates: 47°17′02″N 4°32′50″E
- Country: France
- Region: Bourgogne-Franche-Comté
- Department: Côte-d'Or
- Arrondissement: Beaune
- Canton: Arnay-le-Duc

Government
  - Mayor (2022–2026): Lydie Mercey
- Area^{1}: 14.63 km^{2} (5.65 sq mi)
- Elevation: 428 m (1,404 ft)
- Highest elevation: 570 m (1,870 ft)
- Lowest elevation: 352 m (1,155 ft)
- Population (2023): 237
  - Density: 16.2/km^{2} (42.0/sq mi)
- Time zone: UTC+01:00 (CET)
  - Summer (DST): UTC+02:00 (CEST)
- INSEE/Postal code: 21062 /21320
- ^{1} French Land Register data, which excludes lakes, ponds, glaciers > 1 km^{2} (0.386 sq mi or 247 acres) and river estuaries.

Bellenot-sous-Pouilly (French pronunciation: [bɛlno su puji], literally Bellenot under Pouilly) is a commune in the Côte-d'Or department in the Bourgogne-Franche-Comté region of France.

== Population ==
Historical population
| Year | Pop. | ±% p.a. |
|---|---|---|
| 1968 | 233 | — |
| 1975 | 178 | −3.77% |
| 1982 | 183 | +0.40% |
| 1990 | 188 | +0.34% |
| 1999 | 198 | +0.58% |
| 2007 | 212 | +0.86% |
| 2012 | 249 | +3.27% |
| 2017 | 224 | −2.09% |
| 2023 | 237 | +0.94% |
Source: INSEE

== See also ==
- Communes of the Côte-d'Or department
