= Bessey-la-Cour =

- Commune
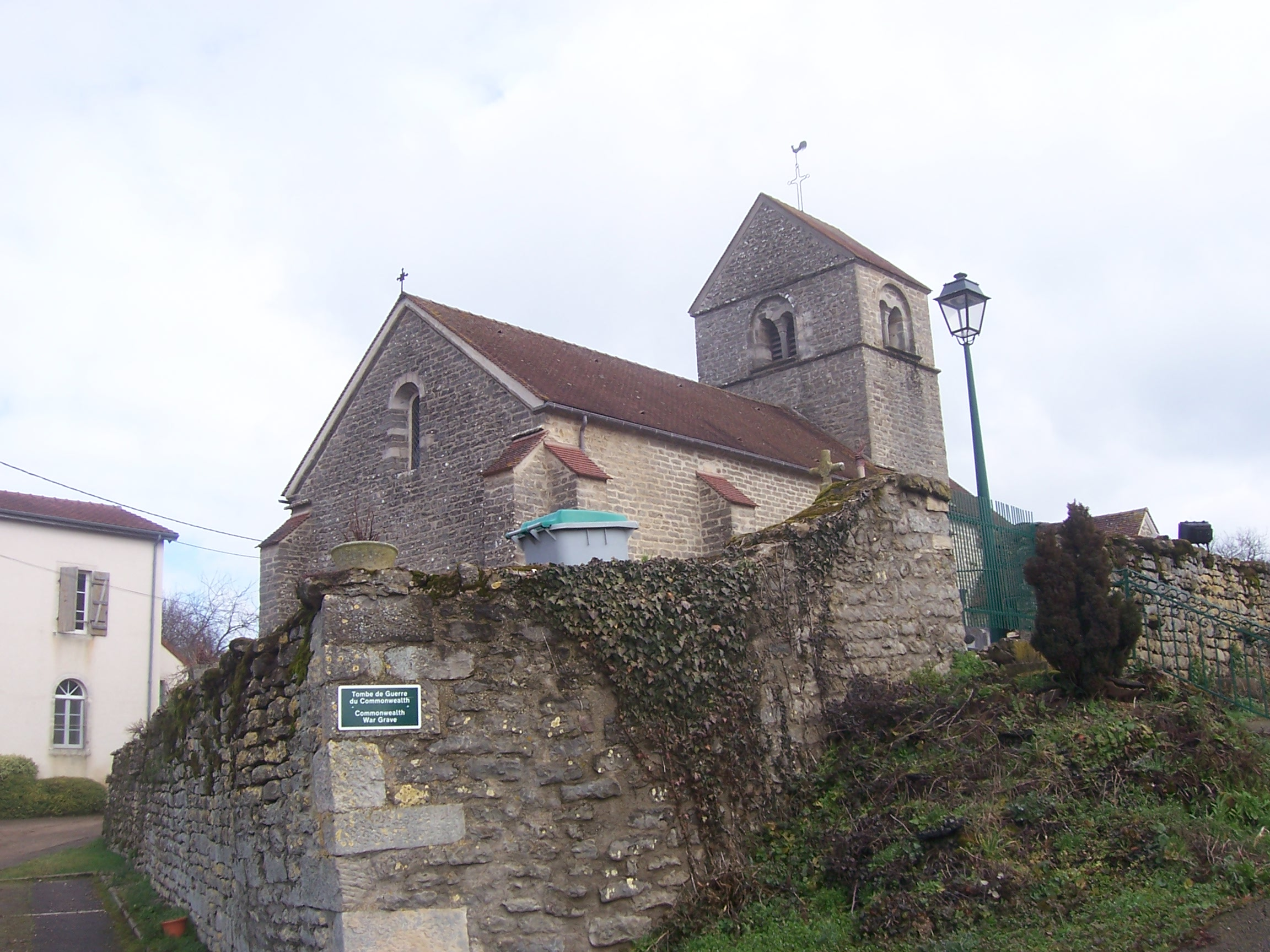
- The church in Bessey-la-Cour
- Location of Bessey-la-Cour
- Location within France Location within Bourgogne-Franche-Comté
- Coordinates: 47°05′56″N 4°36′51″E
- Country: France
- Region: Bourgogne-Franche-Comté
- Department: Côte-d'Or
- Arrondissement: Beaune
- Canton: Arnay-le-Duc

Government
  - Mayor (2020–2026): Jean-Pierre Liebault
- Area^{1}: 4.59 km^{2} (1.77 sq mi)
- Elevation: 430 m (1,410 ft)
- Highest elevation: 429 m (1,407 ft)
- Lowest elevation: 380 m (1,250 ft)
- Population (2023): 59
  - Density: 13/km^{2} (33/sq mi)
- Time zone: UTC+01:00 (CET)
  - Summer (DST): UTC+02:00 (CEST)
- INSEE/Postal code: 21066 /21360
- ^{1} French Land Register data, which excludes lakes, ponds, glaciers > 1 km^{2} (0.386 sq mi or 247 acres) and river estuaries.

Bessey-la-Cour (French pronunciation: [bɛsɛ la kuʁ]) is a commune in the Côte-d'Or department in the region of Bourgogne-Franche-Comté in eastern France.

== Population ==
Historical population
Year	Pop.	±% p.a.
1968	86	—
1975	87	+0.17%
1982	81	−1.02%
1990	93	+1.74%
1999	79	−1.80%
2007	75	−0.65%
2012	69	−1.65%
2017	57	−3.75%
2023	59	+0.58%
Source: INSEE

== See also ==
- Communes of the Côte-d'Or department
