= Bessey-en-Chaume =

- Commune
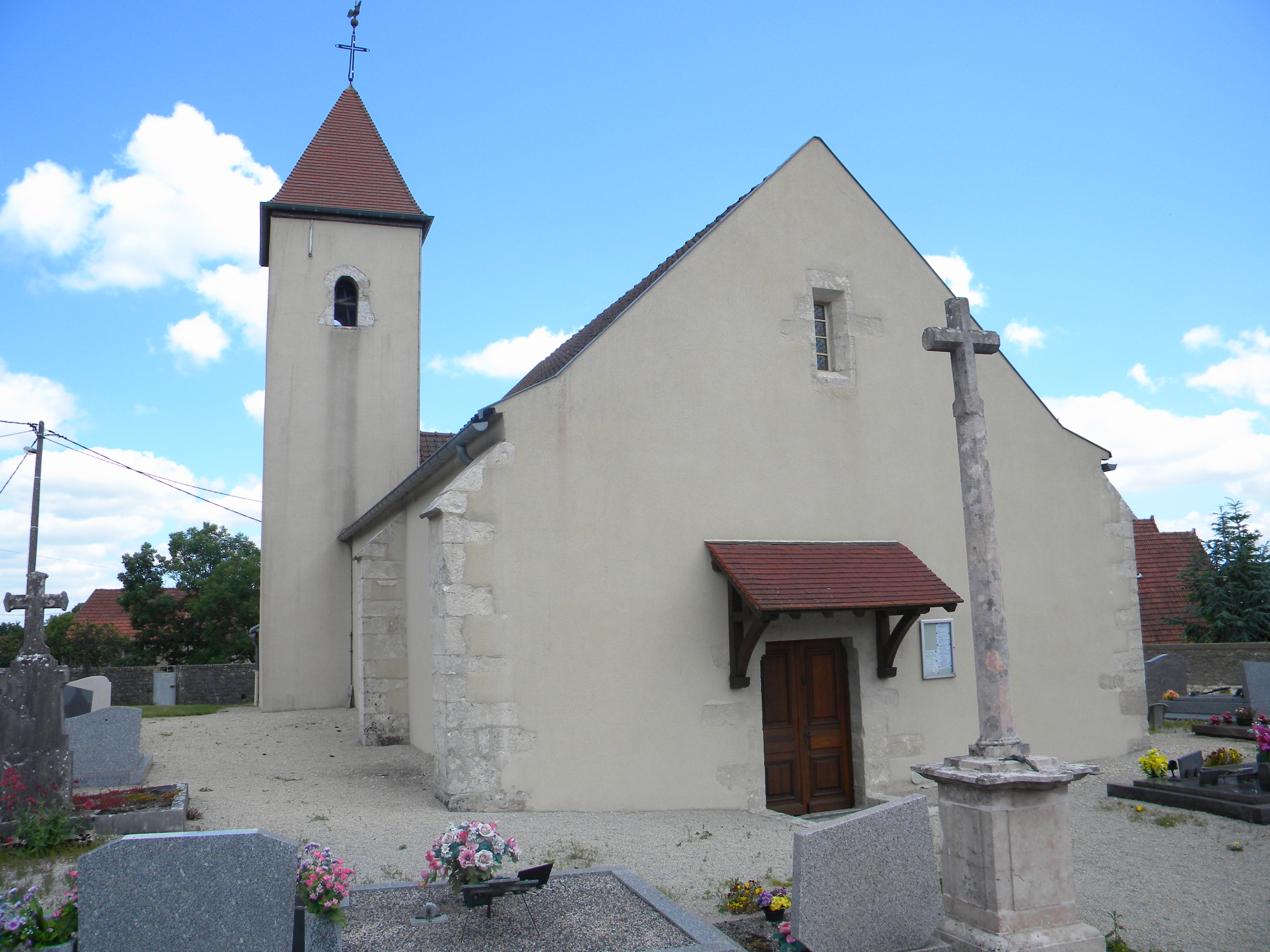
- The church in Bessey-en-Chaume
- Location of Bessey-en-Chaume
- Location within France Location within Bourgogne-Franche-Comté
- Coordinates: 47°04′54″N 4°44′36″E
- Country: France
- Region: Bourgogne-Franche-Comté
- Department: Côte-d'Or
- Arrondissement: Beaune
- Canton: Arnay-le-Duc

Government
  - Mayor (2020–2026): Sylvie Lassey
- Area^{1}: 10.46 km^{2} (4.04 sq mi)
- Elevation: 604 m (1,982 ft)
- Highest elevation: 601 m (1,972 ft)
- Lowest elevation: 365 m (1,198 ft)
- Population (2023): 119
  - Density: 11.4/km^{2} (29.5/sq mi)
- Time zone: UTC+01:00 (CET)
  - Summer (DST): UTC+02:00 (CEST)
- INSEE/Postal code: 21065 /21360
- ^{1} French Land Register data, which excludes lakes, ponds, glaciers > 1 km^{2} (0.386 sq mi or 247 acres) and river estuaries.

Bessey-en-Chaume is a commune in the Côte-d'Or department in eastern France.

== Population ==
Historical population
Year	Pop.	±% p.a.
1968	99	—
1975	82	−2.66%
1982	79	−0.53%
1990	87	+1.21%
1999	98	+1.33%
2007	100	+0.25%
2012	120	+3.71%
2017	145	+3.86%
2023	119	−3.24%
Source: INSEE

== See also ==
- Communes of the Côte-d'Or department
