= Asnières-lès-Dijon =

- Commune
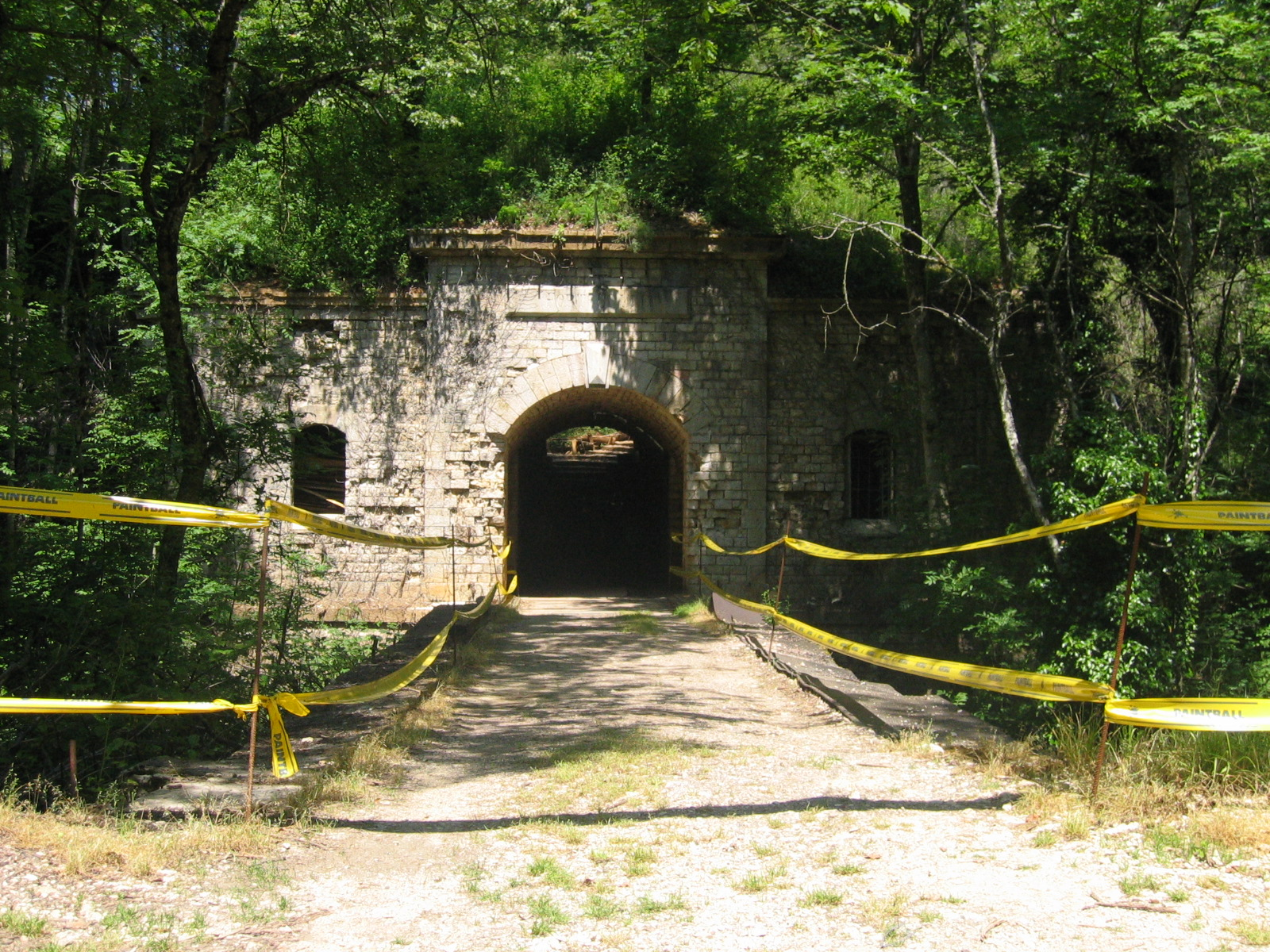
- Fort Brûlé, an old fort in Asnières-lès-Dijon commune

- Coat of arms
- Location of Asnières-lès-Dijon
- Location within France Location within Bourgogne-Franche-Comté
- Coordinates: 47°23′09″N 5°02′44″E
- Country: France
- Region: Bourgogne-Franche-Comté
- Department: Côte-d'Or
- Arrondissement: Dijon
- Canton: Fontaine-lès-Dijon
- Intercommunality: CC Norge Tille

Government
  - Mayor (2020–2026): Patricia Gourmand
- Area^{1}: 4.55 km^{2} (1.76 sq mi)
- Elevation: 331 m (1,086 ft)
- Highest elevation: 352 m (1,155 ft)
- Lowest elevation: 274 m (899 ft)
- Population (2023): 1,310
  - Density: 288/km^{2} (746/sq mi)
- Time zone: UTC+01:00 (CET)
  - Summer (DST): UTC+02:00 (CEST)
- INSEE/Postal code: 21027 /21380
- ^{1} French Land Register data, which excludes lakes, ponds, glaciers > 1 km^{2} (0.386 sq mi or 247 acres) and river estuaries.

Asnières-lès-Dijon (French pronunciation: [ɑnjɛʁ lɛ diʒɔ̃]; literally "Asnières near Dijon") is a commune in the Côte-d'Or department in the Bourgogne-Franche-Comté region of eastern France.

== Geography ==
Asnières-lès-Dijon is located just 8 km north of Dijon. The commune lies between the D903 road which follows its western border from Dijon to Savigny-le-Sec and the D974 which follows the eastern border from Dijon and continues to Til-Châtel. The D104 links the two roads through the village and also continues east to Bellefond. The commune is mixed forest and farmland with a substantial urban area covering some 20% of the commune.

== History ==
After the defeat of France in 1870-1871, Dijon was chosen with Langres, Besançon, Reims, Laon, and La Fère to be a "second line" of the Séré de Rivières system of defence (the first line being focused on Verdun, Toul, Epinal, and Belfort). A series of forts and military redoubts centred on Dijon city were built from 1875 to 1883: la Motte-Giron, Mont-Afrique, Hauteville, Asnières, Norges, Var, Saint-Apollinaire, and Sennecey-lès-Dijon.

Built between 1876 and 1877, Fort Brûlé had the honour of suffering the first armed clash with Prussia.

Fort Brûlé did not defend Dijon during the two world wars. It was the Germans who used it as a storehouse for ammunition during the Second World War. These caused considerable damage in 1944 when the Germans blew up ammunition in the fort: so much so that with the exception of the protruding buttress on Saliant II, there is virtually nothing left of the left half of the fort.

The fort is now the property of a private owner.

The commune has had a very high level of population growth since the 1970s when it was a peaceful farming village. Many employees from the CEA at Valduc came to live there. The population of the commune increased six times in 40 years.

=== Heraldry ===
Arms of Asnières-lès-Dijon	Blazon: Azure, an ear of wheat and a bunch of grapes, stalked and leaved all in Or, isuuant from a crescent of Argent; in chief Gules charged with a crosslet bottony of Or.

== Administration ==
List of Successive Mayors

From	To	Name	Party	Position
2001	2026	Patricia Gourmand	LR	Departmental councillor and departmental secretary of LR

== Demography ==
The inhabitants of the commune are known as Asniérois or Asniéroises in French.

Historical population

Year	Pop.	±% p.a.
1793	111	—
1821	121	+0.31%
1846	149	+0.84%
1872	128	−0.58%
1901	149	+0.53%
1926	130	−0.54%
1946	149	+0.68%
1962	157	+0.33%
1968	376	+15.67%

Year	Pop.	±% p.a.
1975	750	+10.37%
1982	753	+0.06%
1990	829	+1.21%
1999	798	−0.42%
2007	1,191	+5.13%
2012	1,192	+0.02%
2017	1,184	−0.13%
2023	1,310	+1.70%

Source: EHESS and INSEE

The commune is part of the community of communes Norge et Tille.

== Culture and heritage ==
=== Civil heritage ===
The commune has two sites which are registered as historical monuments. These are:

- Fort Brûlé (1876)
- The Cemetery (1402)
Fort Brûlé
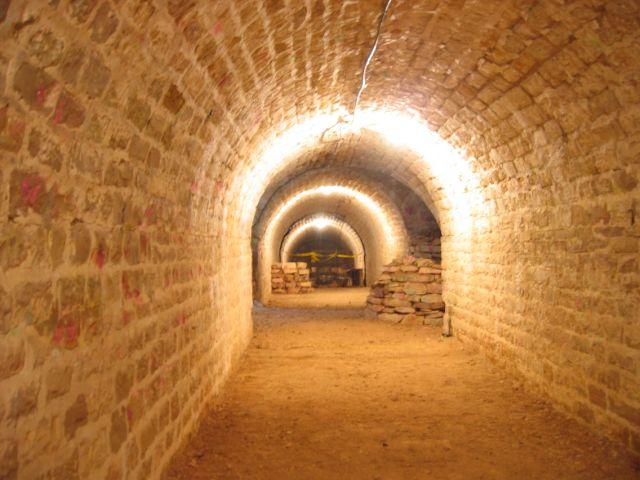
The Tunnel.

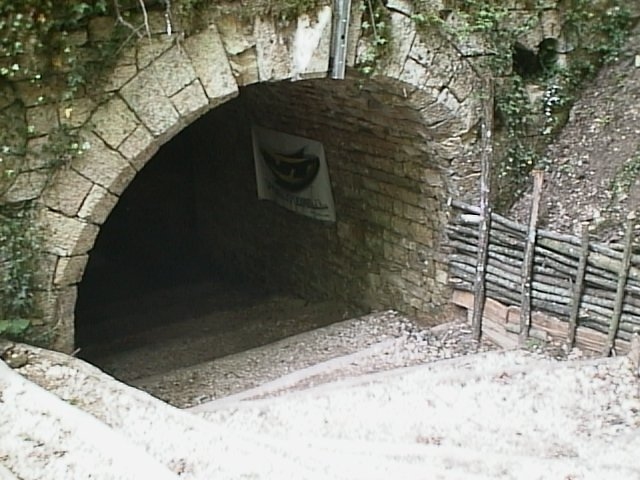
The Entrance.

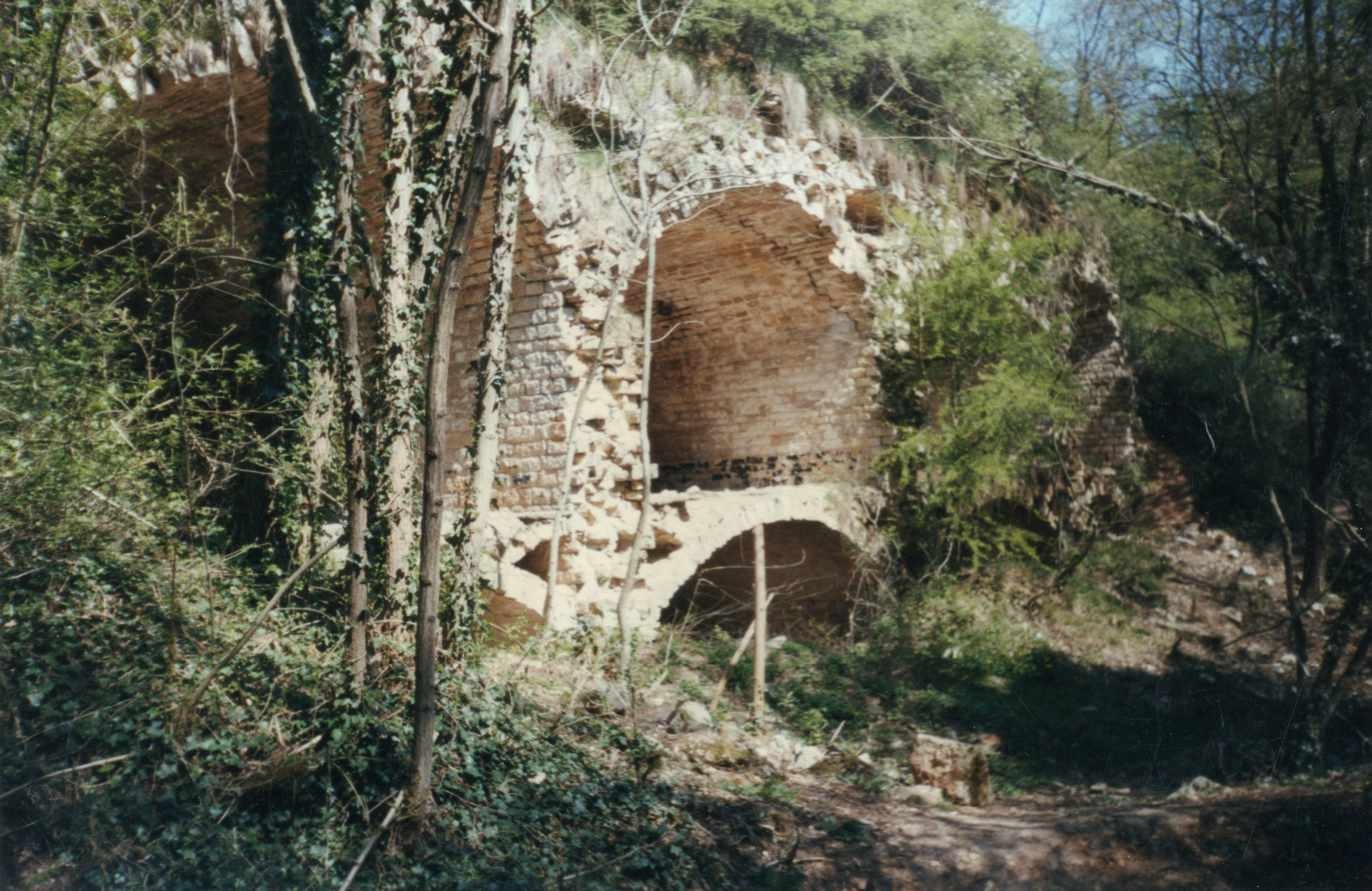
The collapsed part.

=== Religious heritage ===
- The Parish Church of Saint-Alban contains one item registered as a historical object:
  - Eucharistic tower (14th century)
- The Parish Church of the Nativity contains several items which have been registered as historical objects:
  - Painting: Sainte-Famille and his family (17th century)
  - Statue: Saint Claude (17th century)
  - Statue: Saint Abdon (17th century)
  - Group sculpture: Virgin of pity (16th century)
  - Retable: Apostolic cortege (15th century)
  - Statue: Virgin and child (15th century)

== Facilities ==
Asnières has shops (bakery, butcher, a small hall, and a petting zoo) and various facilities including a hall and sports grounds (tennis, football, basketball, rugby). The town also has a nursery and primary school.

It also has a Judo club - the Entente Judo Messigny-et-Vantoux - Val de Norge (Ejmn)

== See also ==
- Communes of the Côte-d'Or department
