= Étaules =

Étaules may refer to the following places in France:

- Étaules, Charente-Maritime, a commune in the department of Charente-Maritime
- Étaules, Côte-d'Or, a commune in the department of Côte-d'Or
