= Flacey =

Flacey is the name of several communes in France:

- Flacey, Côte-d'Or, a commune in the Côte-d'Or department in eastern France
- Flacey, Eure-et-Loir, a commune in the Eure-et-Loir department in north-central France
- Flacey-en-Bresse, Saône-et-Loire
