= Communes of the Côte-d'Or department =

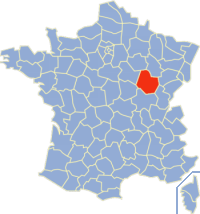

The following is a list of the 698 communes of the Côte-d'Or department of France.

The communes cooperate in the following intercommunalities (as of 2020):

- Dijon Métropole
- Communauté d'agglomération Beaune Côte et Sud (partly)
- Communauté de communes Auxonne Pontailler Val de Saône
- Communauté de communes Forêts, Seine et Suzon
- Communauté de communes de Gevrey-Chambertin et de Nuits-Saint-Georges
- Communauté de communes Mirebellois et Fontenois
- Communauté de communes du Montbardois
- Communauté de communes Norge et Tille
- Communauté de communes Ouche et Montagne
- Communauté de communes du Pays Arnay Liernais
- Communauté de communes du Pays Châtillonnais
- Communauté de communes du Pays d'Alésia et de la Seine
- Communauté de communes de la Plaine Dijonnaise
- Communauté de communes de Pouilly-en-Auxois et Bligny-sur-Ouche
- Communauté de communes Rives de Saône
- Communauté de communes de Saulieu
- Communauté de communes des Terres d'Auxois
- Communauté de communes Tille et Venelle
- Communauté de communes des Vallées de la Tille et de l'Ignon

INSEE	Postal	Commune
21001	21700	Agencourt
21002	21410	Agey
21003	21121	Ahuy
21004	21510	Aignay-le-Duc
21005	21110	Aiserey
21006	21400	Aisey-sur-Seine
21007	21390	Aisy-sous-Thil
21008	21150	Alise-Sainte-Reine
21009	21230	Allerey
21010	21420	Aloxe-Corton
21011	21450	Ampilly-les-Bordes
21012	21400	Ampilly-le-Sec
21013	21410	Ancey
21014	21360	Antheuil
21015	21230	Antigny-la-Ville
21016	21310	Arceau
21017	21700	Arcenant
21018	21410	Arcey
21020	21320	Arconcey
21021	21560	Arc-sur-Tille
21022	21700	Argilly
21023	21230	Arnay-le-Duc
21024	21350	Arnay-sous-Vitteaux
21025	21500	Arrans
21026	21500	Asnières-en-Montagne
21027	21380	Asnières-lès-Dijon
21028	21130	Athée
21029	21500	Athie
21030	21360	Aubaine
21031	21170	Aubigny-en-Plaine
21032	21340	Aubigny-la-Ronce
21033	21540	Aubigny-lès-Sombernon
21034	21570	Autricourt
21035	21250	Auvillars-sur-Saône
21036	21360	Auxant
21037	21190	Auxey-Duresses
21038	21130	Auxonne
21039	21120	Avelanges
21040	21350	Avosnes
21041	21580	Avot
21042	21700	Bagnot
21043	21450	Baigneux-les-Juifs
21044	21330	Balot
21045	21410	Barbirey-sur-Ouche
21046	21430	Bard-le-Régulier
21047	21460	Bard-lès-Époisses
21048	21910	Barges
21049	21580	Barjon
21050	21340	Baubigny
21051	21410	Baulme-la-Roche
21052	21510	Beaulieu
21053	21310	Beaumont-sur-Vingeanne
21054	21200	Beaune
21055	21510	Beaunotte
21056	21310	Beire-le-Châtel
21057	21110	Beire-le-Fort
21058	21570	Belan-sur-Ource
21059	21490	Bellefond
21060	21310	Belleneuve
21061	21510	Bellenod-sur-Seine
21062	21320	Bellenot-sous-Pouilly
21063	21290	Beneuvre
21064	21500	Benoisey
21065	21360	Bessey-en-Chaume
21066	21360	Bessey-la-Cour
21067	21110	Bessey-lès-Cîteaux
21068	21320	Beurey-Bauguay
21069	21350	Beurizot
21070	21220	Bévy
21071	21310	Bèze
21072	21310	Bézouotte
21074	21130	Billey
21075	21450	Billy-lès-Chanceaux
21076	21270	Binges
21077	21520	Bissey-la-Côte
21078	21330	Bissey-la-Pierre
21079	21310	Blagny-sur-Vingeanne
21080	21540	Blaisy-Bas
21081	21540	Blaisy-Haut
21082	21320	Blancey
21083	21430	Blanot
21086	21200	Bligny-lès-Beaune
21085	21440	Bligny-le-Sec
21087	21360	Bligny-sur-Ouche
21088	21700	Boncourt-le-Bois
21089	21250	Bonnencontre
21090	21520	Boudreville
21091	21360	Bouhey
21092	21420	Bouilland
21093	21330	Bouix
21094	21610	Bourberain
21095	21250	Bousselange
21096	21260	Boussenois
21097	21350	Boussey
21098	21690	Boux-sous-Salmaise
21099	21200	Bouze-lès-Beaune
21100	21350	Brain
21101	21390	Braux
21102	21430	Brazey-en-Morvan
21103	21470	Brazey-en-Plaine
21104	21400	Brémur-et-Vaurois
21105	21560	Bressey-sur-Tille
21106	21110	Bretenière
21107	21490	Bretigny
21108	21390	Brianny
21109	21570	Brion-sur-Ource
21110	21220	Brochon
21111	21490	Brognon
21112	21250	Broin
21113	21220	Broindon
21114	21500	Buffon
21115	21400	Buncey
21116	21290	Bure-les-Templiers
21117	21510	Busseaut
21118	21580	Busserotte-et-Montenaille
21119	21580	Bussières
21120	21360	La Bussière-sur-Ouche
21121	21540	Bussy-la-Pesle
21122	21150	Bussy-le-Grand
21123	21290	Buxerolles
21124	21430	Censerey
21125	21330	Cérilly
21126	21110	Cessey-sur-Tille
21127	21120	Chaignay
21128	21320	Chailly-sur-Armançon
21129	21290	Chambain
21130	21110	Chambeire
21131	21250	Chamblanc
21132	21220	Chambœuf
21133	21220	Chambolle-Musigny
21134	21400	Chamesson
21135	21310	Champagne-sur-Vingeanne
21136	21440	Champagny
21137	21500	Champ-d'Oiseau
21138	21130	Champdôtre
21139	21210	Champeau-en-Morvan
21140	21230	Champignolles
21141	21690	Champrenault
21142	21440	Chanceaux
21143	21330	Channay
21144	21690	Charencey
21145	21140	Charigny
21146	21310	Charmes
21147	21350	Charny
21148	21170	Charrey-sur-Saône
21149	21400	Charrey-sur-Seine
21150	21190	Chassagne-Montrachet
21151	21150	Chassey
21152	21320	Châteauneuf
21153	21320	Châtellenot
21154	21400	Châtillon-sur-Seine
21155	21360	Chaudenay-la-Ville
21156	21360	Chaudenay-le-Château
21157	21290	Chaugey
21159	21520	La Chaume
21158	21610	Chaume-et-Courchamp
21160	21450	Chaume-lès-Baigneux
21161	21400	Chaumont-le-Bois
21162	21700	Chaux
21163	21260	Chazeuil
21164	21320	Chazilly
21165	21400	Chemin-d'Aisey
21166	21300	Chenôve
21167	21310	Cheuge
21168	21540	Chevannay
21169	21220	Chevannes
21170	21200	Chevigny-en-Valière
21171	21800	Chevigny-Saint-Sauveur
21172	21820	Chivres
21173	21200	Chorey-les-Beaune
21175	21270	Cirey-lès-Pontailler
21176	21320	Civry-en-Montagne
21177	21390	Clamerey
21179	21490	Clénay
21180	21270	Cléry
21181	21230	Clomot
21183	21110	Collonges-et-Premières
21182	21220	Collonges-lès-Bévy
21184	21360	Colombier
21185	21200	Combertault
21186	21700	Comblanchien
21187	21320	Commarin
21189	21250	Corberon
21190	21190	Corcelles-les-Arts
21191	21910	Corcelles-lès-Cîteaux
21192	21160	Corcelles-les-Monts
21193	21250	Corgengoux
21194	21700	Corgoloin
21195	21340	Cormot-Vauchignon
21196	21190	Corpeau
21197	21150	Corpoyer-la-Chapelle
21198	21460	Corrombles
21199	21460	Corsaint
21200	21160	Couchey
21201	21400	Coulmier-le-Sec
21202	21520	Courban
21203	21460	Courcelles-Frémoy
21204	21500	Courcelles-lès-Montbard
21205	21140	Courcelles-lès-Semur
21207	21580	Courlon
21208	21120	Courtivron
21209	21560	Couternon
21210	21320	Créancey
21211	21120	Crécey-sur-Tille
21212	21500	Crépand
21214	21360	Crugey
21215	21310	Cuiserey
21216	21230	Culètre
21217	21220	Curley
21218	21380	Curtil-Saint-Seine
21219	21220	Curtil-Vergy
21220	21580	Cussey-les-Forges
21221	21360	Cussy-la-Colonne
21222	21230	Cussy-le-Châtel
21223	21121	Daix
21224	21350	Dampierre-en-Montagne
21225	21310	Dampierre-et-Flée
21226	21150	Darcey
21227	21121	Darois
21228	21220	Détain-et-Bruant
21229	21430	Diancey
21230	21120	Diénay
21231	21000	Dijon
21232	21390	Dompierre-en-Morvan
21233	21270	Drambon
21234	21540	Drée
21235	21510	Duesme
21236	21190	Ébaty
21237	21510	Échalot
21238	21540	Échannay
21239	21170	Échenon
21240	21120	Échevannes
21241	21420	Échevronne
21242	21110	Échigey
21243	21360	Écutigny
21244	21320	Éguilly
21245	21380	Épagny
21246	21220	Épernay-sous-Gevrey
21247	21460	Époisses
21248	21500	Éringes
21249	21170	Esbarres
21250	21290	Essarois
21251	21320	Essey
21252	21500	Étais
21253	21510	Étalante
21254	21220	L'Étang-Vergy
21255	21121	Étaules
21256	21270	Étevaux
21257	21450	Étormay
21258	21400	Étrochey
21259	21500	Fain-lès-Montbard
21260	21500	Fain-lès-Moutiers
21261	21110	Fauverney
21262	21290	Faverolles-lès-Lucey
21263	21600	Fénay
21264	21230	Le Fête
21265	21220	Fixin
21266	21490	Flacey
21267	21640	Flagey-Echézeaux
21268	21130	Flagey-lès-Auxonne
21269	21130	Flammerans
21270	21160	Flavignerot
21271	21150	Flavigny-sur-Ozerain
21273	21410	Fleurey-sur-Ouche
21274	21230	Foissy
21275	21260	Foncegrive
21277	21610	Fontaine-Française
21278	21121	Fontaine-lès-Dijon
21276	21450	Fontaines-en-Duesmois
21279	21330	Fontaines-les-Sèches
21280	21390	Fontangy
21281	21610	Fontenelle
21282	21460	Forléans
21283	21580	Fraignot-et-Vesvrotte
21284	21440	Francheville
21285	21170	Franxault
21286	21120	Frénois
21287	21500	Fresnes
21288	21150	Frôlois
21289	21700	Fussey
21290	21120	Gemeaux
21291	21140	Genay
21292	21110	Genlis
21293	21410	Gergueil
21294	21700	Gerland
21295	21220	Gevrey-Chambertin
21296	21520	Gevrolles
21297	21640	Gilly-lès-Cîteaux
21298	21350	Gissey-le-Vieil
21299	21150	Gissey-sous-Flavigny
21300	21410	Gissey-sur-Ouche
21301	21250	Glanon
21302	21400	Gomméville
21303	21520	Les Goulles
21304	21580	Grancey-le-Château-Neuvelle
21305	21570	Grancey-sur-Ource
21306	21540	Grenant-lès-Sombernon
21307	21150	Grésigny-Sainte-Reine
21308	21150	Grignon
21309	21330	Griselles
21310	21540	Grosbois-en-Montagne
21311	21250	Grosbois-lès-Tichey
21312	21290	Gurgy-la-Ville
21313	21290	Gurgy-le-Château
21314	21150	Hauteroche
21315	21121	Hauteville-lès-Dijon
21316	21270	Heuilley-sur-Saône
21317	21120	Is-sur-Tille
21319	21110	Izeure
21320	21110	Izier
21321	21150	Jailly-les-Moulins
21322	21250	Jallanges
21323	21310	Jancigny
21324	21460	Jeux-lès-Bard
21325	21230	Jouey
21326	21450	Jours-lès-Baigneux
21328	21210	Juillenay
21329	21140	Juilly
21330	21110	Labergement-Foigney
21331	21130	Labergement-lès-Auxonne
21332	21820	Labergement-lès-Seurre
21333	21250	Labruyère
21334	21230	Lacanche
21335	21210	Lacour-d'Arcenay
21606	21550	Ladoix-Serrigny
21336	21330	Laignes
21337	21760	Lamarche-sur-Saône
21338	21440	Lamargelle
21339	21370	Lantenay
21340	21250	Lanthes
21341	21140	Lantilly
21342	21170	Laperrière-sur-Saône
21343	21330	Larrey
21344	21250	Lechâtelet
21345	21440	Léry
21346	21290	Leuglay
21347	21200	Levernois
21348	21610	Licey-sur-Vingeanne
21349	21430	Liernais
21350	21520	Lignerolles
21351	21110	Longchamp
21352	21110	Longeault-Pluvault
21353	21110	Longecourt-en-Plaine
21354	21230	Longecourt-lès-Culêtre
21355	21600	Longvic
21356	21170	Losne
21357	21520	Louesme

INSEE	Postal	Commune
21358	21150	Lucenay-le-Duc
21359	21290	Lucey
21360	21360	Lusigny-sur-Ouche
21361	21120	Lux
21362	21320	Maconge
21363	21230	Magnien
21364	21450	Magny-Lambert
21365	21140	Magny-la-Ville
21366	21170	Magny-lès-Aubigny
21368	21700	Magny-lès-Villers
21367	21130	Magny-Montarlot
21369	21310	Magny-Saint-Médard
21370	21110	Magny-sur-Tille
21371	21130	Les Maillys
21372	21400	Maisey-le-Duc
21373	21410	Mâlain
21374	21230	Maligny
21375	21430	Manlay
21376	21270	Marandeuil
21377	21350	Marcellois
21378	21330	Marcenay
21379	21430	Marcheseuil
21380	21390	Marcigny-sous-Thil
21381	21350	Marcilly-et-Dracy
21382	21320	Marcilly-Ogny
21383	21120	Marcilly-sur-Tille
21384	21700	Marey-lès-Fussey
21385	21120	Marey-sur-Tille
21386	21150	Marigny-le-Cahouët
21387	21200	Marigny-lès-Reullée
21388	21110	Marliens
21389	21500	Marmagne
21390	21160	Marsannay-la-Côte
21391	21380	Marsannay-le-Bois
21392	21320	Martrois
21393	21400	Massingy
21394	21140	Massingy-lès-Semur
21395	21350	Massingy-lès-Vitteaux
21396	21510	Mauvilly
21397	21190	Mavilly-Mandelot
21398	21270	Maxilly-sur-Saône
21399	21320	Meilly-sur-Rouvres
21400	21580	Le Meix
21401	21190	Meloisey
21402	21290	Menesble
21403	21430	Ménessaire
21404	21150	Ménétreux-le-Pitois
21405	21190	Merceuil
21406	21540	Mesmont
21407	21220	Messanges
21408	21380	Messigny-et-Vantoux
21409	21700	Meuilley
21410	21510	Meulson
21411	21200	Meursanges
21412	21190	Meursault
21413	21140	Millery
21414	21230	Mimeure
21415	21510	Minot
21416	21310	Mirebeau-sur-Bèze
21417	21210	Missery
21418	21510	Moitron
21419	21330	Molesme
21420	21340	Molinot
21421	21120	Moloy
21422	21210	Molphey
21423	21200	Montagny-lès-Beaune
21424	21250	Montagny-lès-Seurre
21425	21500	Montbard
21426	21460	Montberthault
21427	21360	Montceau-et-Écharnant
21428	21190	Monthelie
21429	21500	Montigny-Montfort
21433	21610	Montigny-Mornay-Villeneuve-sur-Vingeanne
21430	21390	Montigny-Saint-Barthélemy
21431	21140	Montigny-sur-Armançon
21432	21520	Montigny-sur-Aube
21434	21210	Montlay-en-Auxois
21435	21400	Montliot-et-Courcelles
21436	21250	Montmain
21437	21270	Montmançon
21438	21290	Montmoyen
21439	21540	Montoillot
21440	21170	Montot
21441	21320	Mont-Saint-Jean
21442	21220	Morey-Saint-Denis
21444	21400	Mosson
21445	21210	La Motte-Ternant
21446	21500	Moutiers-Saint-Jean
21447	21230	Musigny
21448	21150	Mussy-la-Fosse
21449	21390	Nan-sous-Thil
21450	21190	Nantoux
21451	21330	Nesle-et-Massoult
21452	21800	Neuilly-Crimolois
21454	21330	Nicey
21455	21400	Nod-sur-Seine
21456	21500	Nogent-lès-Montbard
21457	21390	Noidan
21458	21910	Noiron-sous-Gevrey
21459	21310	Noiron-sur-Bèze
21460	21400	Noiron-sur-Seine
21461	21340	Nolay
21462	21490	Norges-la-Ville
21463	21390	Normier
21464	21700	Nuits-Saint-Georges
21465	21400	Obtrée
21466	21450	Oigny
21467	21310	Oisilly
21468	21610	Orain
21469	21490	Orgeux
21470	21510	Origny
21471	21450	Orret
21472	21260	Orville
21473	21600	Ouges
21474	21250	Pagny-la-Ville
21475	21250	Pagny-le-Château
21476	21360	Painblanc
21477	21540	Panges
21478	21370	Pasques
21479	21440	Pellerey
21480	21420	Pernand-Vergelesses
21481	21160	Perrigny-lès-Dijon
21482	21270	Perrigny-sur-l'Ognon
21483	21120	Pichanges
21484	21500	Planay
21485	21370	Plombières-lès-Dijon
21487	21110	Pluvet
21488	21330	Poinçon-lès-Larrey
21489	21440	Poiseul-la-Grange
21490	21450	Poiseul-la-Ville-et-Laperrière
21491	21120	Poiseul-lès-Saulx
21492	21630	Pommard
21493	21130	Poncey-lès-Athée
21494	21440	Poncey-sur-l'Ignon
21495	21130	Pont
21496	21270	Pontailler-sur-Saône
21497	21140	Pont-et-Massène
21498	21350	Posanges
21499	21400	Pothières
21500	21150	Pouillenay
21501	21320	Pouilly-en-Auxois
21502	21250	Pouilly-sur-Saône
21503	21610	Pouilly-sur-Vingeanne
21504	21410	Prâlon
21505	21390	Précy-sous-Thil
21506	21700	Premeaux-Prissey
21508	21370	Prenois
21510	21400	Prusly-sur-Ource
21511	21400	Puits
21512	21190	Puligny-Montrachet
21514	21510	Quemigny-sur-Seine
21515	21800	Quetigny
21516	21500	Quincerot
21517	21700	Quincey
21518	21500	Quincy-le-Vicomte
21519	21290	Recey-sur-Ource
21520	21540	Remilly-en-Montagne
21521	21560	Remilly-sur-Tille
21522	21310	Renève
21523	21220	Reulle-Vergy
21524	21570	Riel-les-Eaux
21525	21530	La Roche-en-Brenil
21526	21510	Rochefort-sur-Brévon
21527	21340	La Rochepot
21528	21150	La Roche-Vanneau
21529	21390	Roilly
21530	21500	Rougemont
21531	21530	Rouvray
21532	21110	Rouvres-en-Plaine
21533	21320	Rouvres-sous-Meilly
21534	21200	Ruffey-lès-Beaune
21535	21490	Ruffey-lès-Echirey
21536	21260	Sacquenay
21537	21350	Saffres
21538	21530	Saint-Andeux
21539	21540	Saint-Anthot
21540	21850	Saint-Apollinaire
21541	21190	Saint-Aubin
21542	21700	Saint-Bernard
21543	21290	Saint-Broing-les-Moines
21546	21210	Saint-Didier
21544	21350	Sainte-Colombe-en-Auxois
21545	21400	Sainte-Colombe-sur-Seine
21558	21200	Sainte-Marie-la-Blanche
21559	21410	Sainte-Marie-sur-Ouche
21570	21320	Sainte-Sabine
21547	21140	Saint-Euphrône
21548	21530	Saint-Germain-de-Modéon
21549	21510	Saint-Germain-le-Rocheux
21550	21500	Saint-Germain-lès-Senailly
21552	21690	Saint-Hélier
21553	21410	Saint-Jean-de-Bœuf
21554	21170	Saint-Jean-de-Losne
21555	21490	Saint-Julien
21556	21270	Saint-Léger-Triey
21557	21450	Saint-Marc-sur-Seine
21560	21210	Saint-Martin-de-la-Mer
21561	21440	Saint-Martin-du-Mont
21562	21610	Saint-Maurice-sur-Vingeanne
21563	21540	Saint-Mesmin
21564	21700	Saint-Nicolas-lès-Cîteaux
21565	21220	Saint-Philibert
21566	21230	Saint-Pierre-en-Vaux
21567	21230	Saint-Prix-lès-Arnay
21568	21500	Saint-Rémy
21569	21190	Saint-Romain
21571	21270	Saint-Sauveur
21572	21130	Saint-Seine-en-Bâche
21573	21440	Saint-Seine-l'Abbaye
21574	21610	Saint-Seine-sur-Vingeanne
21575	21170	Saint-Symphorien-sur-Saône
21576	21350	Saint-Thibault
21577	21170	Saint-Usage
21578	21410	Saint-Victor-sur-Ouche
21579	21580	Salives
21580	21690	Salmaise
21581	21170	Samerey
21582	21590	Santenay
21583	21340	Santosse
21584	21210	Saulieu
21585	21910	Saulon-la-Chapelle
21586	21910	Saulon-la-Rue
21587	21120	Saulx-le-Duc
21588	21360	Saussey
21589	21380	Saussy
21590	21420	Savigny-lès-Beaune
21591	21380	Savigny-le-Sec
21592	21540	Savigny-sous-Mâlain
21593	21430	Savilly
21594	21500	Savoisy
21595	21310	Savolles
21596	21910	Savouges
21597	21220	Segrois
21598	21150	Seigny
21599	21260	Selongey
21600	21320	Semarey
21601	21220	Semezanges
21602	21450	Semond
21603	21140	Semur-en-Auxois
21604	21500	Senailly
21605	21800	Sennecey-lès-Dijon
21607	21250	Seurre
21608	21530	Sincey-lès-Rouvray
21609	21110	Soirans
21610	21270	Soissons-sur-Nacey
21611	21540	Sombernon
21612	21140	Souhey
21551	21690	Source-Seine
21613	21350	Soussey-sur-Brionne
21614	21120	Spoy
21615	21430	Sussey
21616	21190	Tailly
21617	21240	Talant
21618	21270	Talmay
21619	21310	Tanay
21620	21120	Tarsul
21623	21110	Tart
21622	21110	Tart-le-Bas
21624	21270	Tellecey
21625	21220	Ternant
21626	21290	Terrefondrée
21627	21150	Thenissey
21628	21570	Thoires
21629	21210	Thoisy-la-Berchère
21630	21320	Thoisy-le-Désert
21631	21360	Thomirey
21632	21110	Thorey-en-Plaine
21633	21350	Thorey-sous-Charny
21634	21360	Thorey-sur-Ouche
21635	21460	Thoste
21636	21340	Thury
21637	21250	Tichey
21638	21120	Til-Châtel
21639	21130	Tillenay
21640	21460	Torcy-et-Pouligny
21641	21500	Touillon
21642	21460	Toutry
21643	21130	Tréclun
21644	21310	Trochères
21645	21170	Trouhans
21646	21440	Trouhaut
21647	21250	Trugny
21648	21540	Turcey
21649	21350	Uncey-le-Franc
21650	21220	Urcy
21178	21220	Valforêt
21272	21140	Le Val-Larrey
21327	21340	Val-Mont
21651	21121	Val-Suzon
21652	21320	Vandenesse-en-Auxois
21653	21400	Vannaire
21655	21400	Vanvey
21656	21110	Varanges
21657	21490	Varois-et-Chaignot
21659	21440	Vaux-Saules
21660	21360	Veilly
21661	21370	Velars-sur-Ouche
21662	21350	Velogny
21663	21150	Venarey-les-Laumes
21664	21330	Verdonnet
21665	21260	Vernois-lès-Vesvres
21666	21120	Vernot
21667	21260	Véronnes
21669	21540	Verrey-sous-Drée
21670	21690	Verrey-sous-Salmaise
21671	21330	Vertault
21672	21350	Vesvres
21673	21360	Veuvey-sur-Ouche
21674	21520	Veuxhaulles-sur-Aube
21675	21430	Vianges
21676	21140	Vic-de-Chassenay
21677	21360	Vic-des-Prés
21678	21390	Vic-sous-Thil
21679	21540	Vieilmoulin
21680	21270	Vielverge
21681	21460	Vieux-Château
21682	21310	Viévigne
21683	21230	Viévy
21684	21200	Vignoles
21685	21450	Villaines-en-Duesmois
21686	21500	Villaines-les-Prévôtes
21687	21210	Villargoix
21689	21140	Villars-et-Villenotte
21688	21700	Villars-Fontaine
21690	21350	Villeberny
21691	21700	Villebichot
21692	21120	Villecomte
21693	21330	Villedieu
21694	21350	Villeferry
21695	21450	La Villeneuve-les-Convers
21696	21140	Villeneuve-sous-Charigny
21698	21700	Villers-la-Faye
21699	21130	Villers-les-Pots
21700	21400	Villers-Patras
21701	21130	Villers-Rotin
21702	21120	Villey-sur-Tille
21703	21430	Villiers-en-Morvan
21704	21400	Villiers-le-Duc
21705	21690	Villotte-Saint-Seine
21706	21400	Villotte-sur-Ource
21707	21350	Villy-en-Auxois
21708	21250	Villy-le-Moutier
21709	21500	Viserny
21710	21350	Vitteaux
21711	21400	Vix
21712	21190	Volnay
21713	21270	Vonges
21714	21700	Vosne-Romanée
21715	21230	Voudenay
21716	21640	Vougeot
21717	21290	Voulaines-les-Templiers

== See also ==
- Lists of communes of France
- Administrative divisions of France
