= Champagny =

- Commune
- Location of Champagny
- Location within France Location within Bourgogne-Franche-Comté
- Coordinates: 47°27′27″N 4°45′51″E
- Country: France
- Region: Bourgogne-Franche-Comté
- Department: Côte-d'Or
- Arrondissement: Dijon
- Canton: Fontaine-lès-Dijon

Government
  - Mayor (2020–2026): Daniel Peteuil
- Area^{1}: 7.12 km^{2} (2.75 sq mi)
- Elevation: 523 m (1,716 ft)
- Highest elevation: 545 m (1,788 ft)
- Lowest elevation: 424 m (1,391 ft)
- Population (2023): 27
  - Density: 3.8/km^{2} (9.8/sq mi)
- Time zone: UTC+01:00 (CET)
  - Summer (DST): UTC+02:00 (CEST)
- INSEE/Postal code: 21136 /21440
- ^{1} French Land Register data, which excludes lakes, ponds, glaciers > 1 km^{2} (0.386 sq mi or 247 acres) and river estuaries.

Champagny (French pronunciation: [ʃɑ̃paɲi]) is a commune in the Côte-d'Or department in Bourgogne-Franche-Comté, eastern France.

== Population ==
Historical population
Year	Pop.	±% p.a.
1968	33	—
1975	37	+1.65%
1982	28	−3.90%
1990	32	+1.68%
1999	27	−1.87%
2007	39	+4.70%
2012	29	−5.75%
2017	27	−1.42%
2023	27	+0.00%
Source: INSEE

== See also ==
- Communes of the Côte-d'Or department
