= Ruffey-lès-Echirey =

- Commune
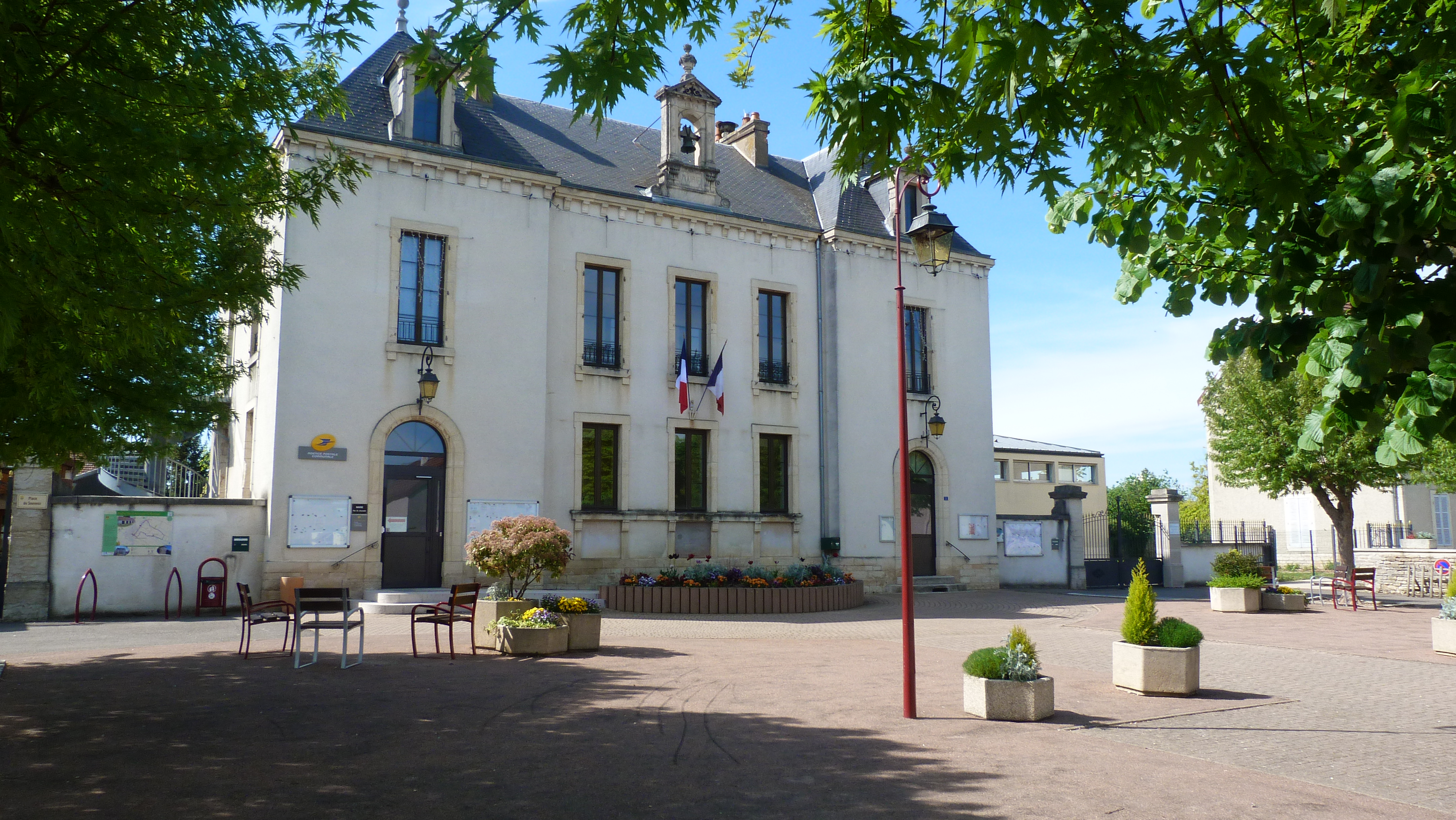
- The town hall in Ruffey

- Coat of arms
- Location of Ruffey-lès-Echirey
- Location within France Location within Bourgogne-Franche-Comté
- Coordinates: 47°22′02″N 5°04′54″E
- Country: France
- Region: Bourgogne-Franche-Comté
- Department: Côte-d'Or
- Arrondissement: Dijon
- Canton: Fontaine-lès-Dijon

Government
  - Mayor (2020–2026): Nadine Mutin
- Area^{1}: 11.12 km^{2} (4.29 sq mi)
- Highest elevation: 305 m (1,001 ft)
- Lowest elevation: 219 m (719 ft)
- Population (2023): 1,385
  - Density: 124.6/km^{2} (322.6/sq mi)
- Time zone: UTC+01:00 (CET)
  - Summer (DST): UTC+02:00 (CEST)
- INSEE/Postal code: 21535 /21490
- ^{1} French Land Register data, which excludes lakes, ponds, glaciers > 1 km^{2} (0.386 sq mi or 247 acres) and river estuaries.

Ruffey-lès-Echirey (French pronunciation: [ʁyfɛ lɛ.z‿eʃiʁɛ]) is a commune in the Côte-d'Or department in eastern France.

== Population ==
Historical population
Year	Pop.	±% p.a.
1968	696	—
1975	763	+1.32%
1982	819	+1.02%
1990	867	+0.71%
1999	1,081	+2.48%
2007	1,116	+0.40%
2012	1,242	+2.16%
2017	1,309	+1.06%
2023	1,385	+0.95%
Source: INSEE

== See also ==
- Communes of the Côte-d'Or department
