= Brognon, Côte-d'Or =

Brognon
- Commune
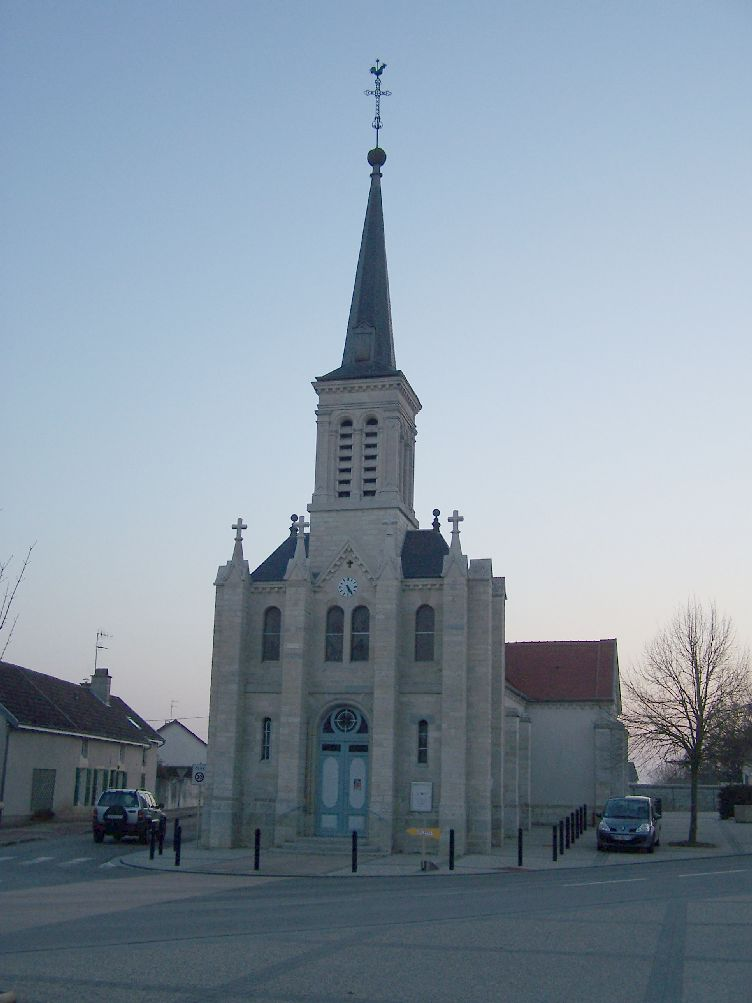
- The church in Brognon

- Coat of arms
- Location of Brognon
- Location within France Location within Bourgogne-Franche-Comté
- Coordinates: 47°24′16″N 5°09′58″E
- Country: France
- Region: Bourgogne-Franche-Comté
- Department: Côte-d'Or
- Arrondissement: Dijon
- Canton: Fontaine-lès-Dijon

Government
  - Mayor (2020–2026): Ludovic Rochette
- Area^{1}: 6.24 km^{2} (2.41 sq mi)
- Highest elevation: 264 m (866 ft)
- Lowest elevation: 228 m (748 ft)
- Population (2023): 317
  - Density: 50.8/km^{2} (132/sq mi)
- Time zone: UTC+01:00 (CET)
  - Summer (DST): UTC+02:00 (CEST)
- INSEE/Postal code: 21111 /21490
- ^{1} French Land Register data, which excludes lakes, ponds, glaciers > 1 km^{2} (0.386 sq mi or 247 acres) and river estuaries.

Brognon (French pronunciation: [bʁɔɲɔ̃]) is a commune in the Côte-d'Or department in eastern France.

== Population ==
Historical population
Year	Pop.	±% p.a.
1968	89	—
1975	110	+3.07%
1982	150	+4.53%
1990	221	+4.96%
1999	215	−0.31%
2007	251	+1.95%
2012	269	+1.39%
2017	307	+2.68%
2023	317	+0.54%
Source: INSEE

== See also ==
- Communes of the Côte-d'Or department
