= Canton of Fontaine-lès-Dijon =

Coordinates: 47.35°N 5.02°E

The canton of Fontaine-lès-Dijon is an administrative division of the Côte-d'Or department, eastern France. Its borders were modified at the French canton reorganisation which came into effect in March 2015. Its seat is in Fontaine-lès-Dijon.

It consists of the following communes:

1. Ahuy
2. Asnières-lès-Dijon
3. Bellefond
4. Bligny-le-Sec
5. Bretigny
6. Brognon
7. Champagny
8. Clénay
9. Curtil-Saint-Seine
10. Daix
11. Darois
12. Étaules
13. Flacey
14. Fontaine-lès-Dijon
15. Hauteville-lès-Dijon
16. Messigny-et-Vantoux
17. Norges-la-Ville
18. Orgeux
19. Panges
20. Prenois
21. Ruffey-lès-Echirey
22. Saint-Julien
23. Saint-Martin-du-Mont
24. Saint-Seine-l'Abbaye
25. Saussy
26. Savigny-le-Sec
27. Trouhaut
28. Turcey
29. Val-Suzon
30. Villotte-Saint-Seine
