= Trouhaut =

- Commune
- Coat of arms
- Location of Trouhaut
- Location within France Location within Bourgogne-Franche-Comté
- Coordinates: 47°23′29″N 4°45′25″E
- Country: France
- Region: Bourgogne-Franche-Comté
- Department: Côte-d'Or
- Arrondissement: Dijon
- Canton: Fontaine-lès-Dijon

Government
  - Mayor (2020–2026): Cyrille Fauconet
- Area^{1}: 9.4 km^{2} (3.6 sq mi)
- Elevation: 443 m (1,453 ft)
- Highest elevation: 597 m (1,959 ft)
- Lowest elevation: 380 m (1,250 ft)
- Population (2023): 131
  - Density: 14/km^{2} (36/sq mi)
- Time zone: UTC+01:00 (CET)
  - Summer (DST): UTC+02:00 (CEST)
- INSEE/Postal code: 21646 /21440
- ^{1} French Land Register data, which excludes lakes, ponds, glaciers > 1 km^{2} (0.386 sq mi or 247 acres) and river estuaries.

Trouhaut (French pronunciation: [tʁu.o]) is a commune in the Côte-d'Or department in eastern France.

== Population ==
Historical population
Year	Pop.	±% p.a.
1968	142	—
1975	135	−0.72%
1982	134	−0.11%
1990	129	−0.47%
1999	125	−0.35%
2007	109	−1.70%
2012	105	−0.74%
2017	117	+2.19%
2023	131	+1.90%
Source: INSEE

== See also ==
- Communes of the Côte-d'Or department
