= Villers-Patras =

- Commune
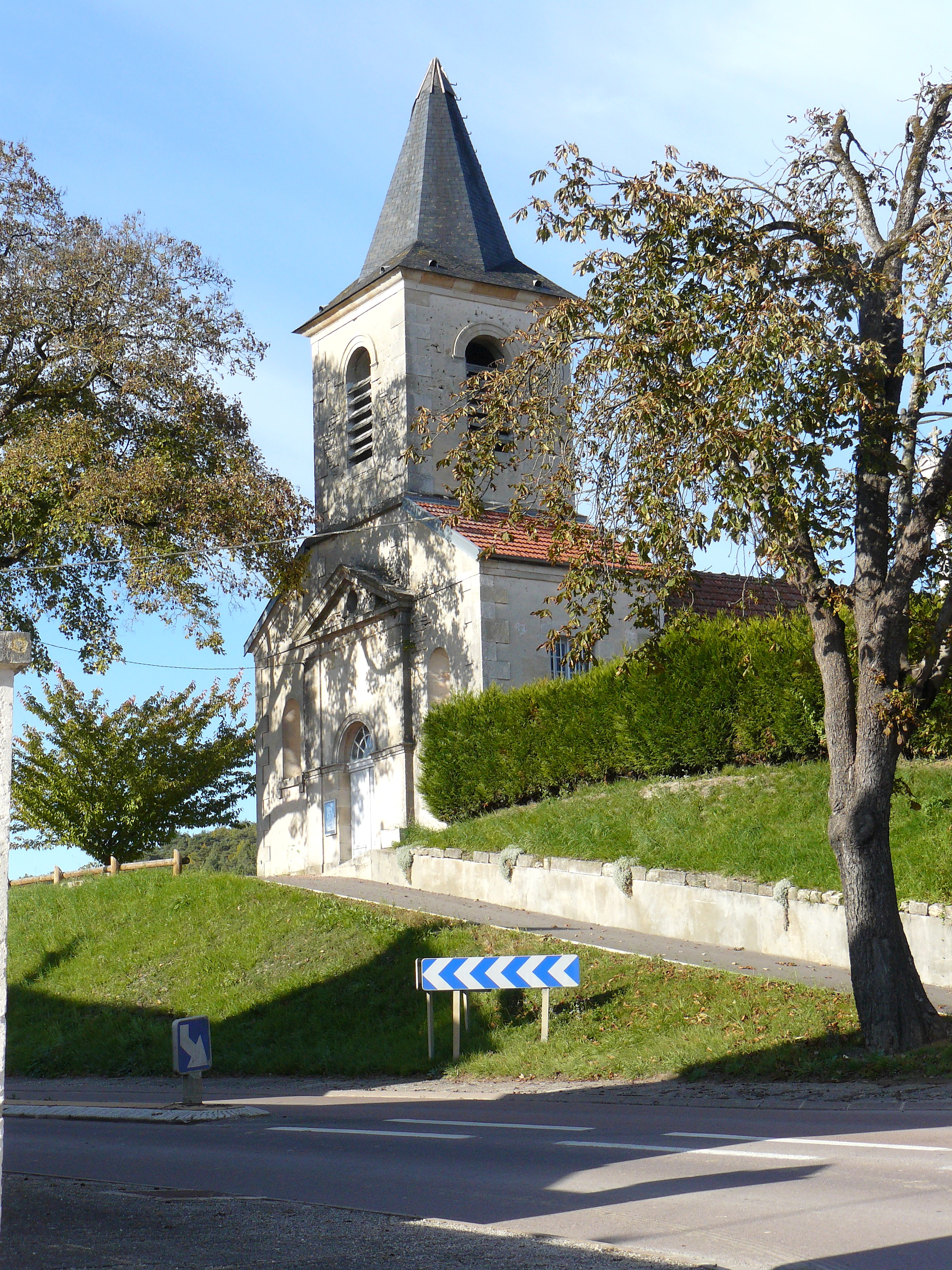
- The church in Villers-Patras

- Coat of arms
- Location of Villers-Patras
- Location within France Location within Bourgogne-Franche-Comté
- Coordinates: 47°55′51″N 4°32′30″E
- Country: France
- Region: Bourgogne-Franche-Comté
- Department: Côte-d'Or
- Arrondissement: Montbard
- Canton: Châtillon-sur-Seine
- Intercommunality: Pays Châtillonnais

Government
  - Mayor (2020–2026): Agnès Chaumonnot
- Area^{1}: 6.3 km^{2} (2.4 sq mi)
- Highest elevation: 339 m (1,112 ft)
- Lowest elevation: 194 m (636 ft)
- Population (2023): 94
  - Density: 15/km^{2} (39/sq mi)
- Time zone: UTC+01:00 (CET)
  - Summer (DST): UTC+02:00 (CEST)
- INSEE/Postal code: 21700 /21400
- ^{1} French Land Register data, which excludes lakes, ponds, glaciers > 1 km^{2} (0.386 sq mi or 247 acres) and river estuaries.

Villers-Patras is a commune in the Côte-d'Or department in eastern France.

== Population ==
Historical population
Year	Pop.	±% p.a.
1968	109	—
1975	95	−1.94%
1982	116	+2.89%
1990	123	+0.74%
1999	123	+0.00%
2007	98	−2.80%
2012	104	+1.20%
2017	97	−1.38%
2023	94	−0.52%
Source: INSEE

== See also ==
- Communes of the Côte-d'Or department
