= Turcey =

- Commune
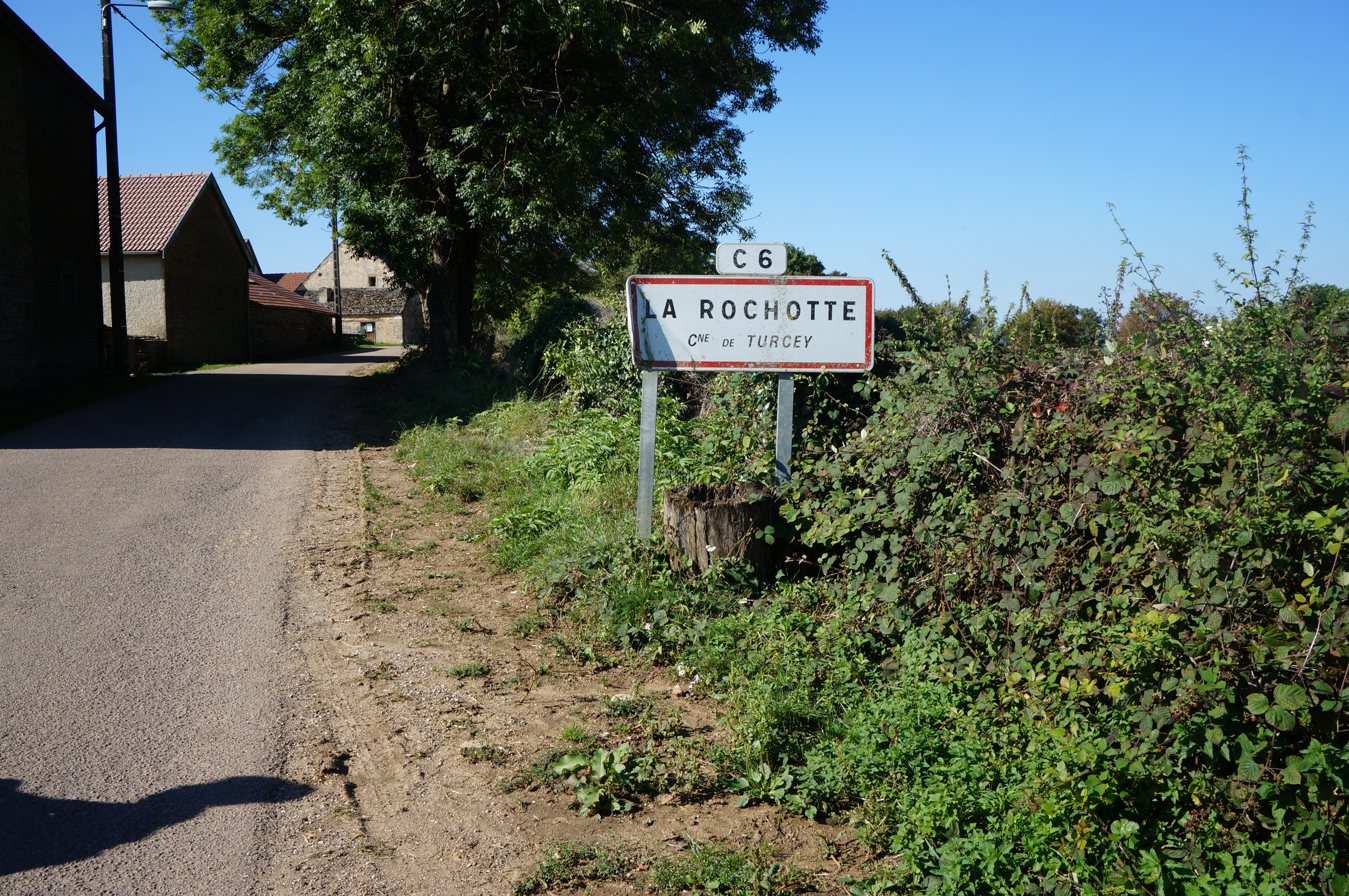
- The road into the hamlet of La Rochotte
- Location of Turcey
- Location within France Location within Bourgogne-Franche-Comté
- Coordinates: 47°24′25″N 4°43′05″E
- Country: France
- Region: Bourgogne-Franche-Comté
- Department: Côte-d'Or
- Arrondissement: Dijon
- Canton: Fontaine-lès-Dijon

Government
  - Mayor (2020–2026): Dominique Fevret
- Area^{1}: 12.45 km^{2} (4.81 sq mi)
- Elevation: 368 m (1,207 ft)
- Highest elevation: 579 m (1,900 ft)
- Lowest elevation: 350 m (1,150 ft)
- Population (2023): 187
  - Density: 15.0/km^{2} (38.9/sq mi)
- Time zone: UTC+01:00 (CET)
  - Summer (DST): UTC+02:00 (CEST)
- INSEE/Postal code: 21648 /21540
- ^{1} French Land Register data, which excludes lakes, ponds, glaciers > 1 km^{2} (0.386 sq mi or 247 acres) and river estuaries.

Turcey (French pronunciation: [tyʁsɛ]) is a commune in the Côte-d'Or department in eastern France.

== Population ==
Historical population
Year	Pop.	±% p.a.
1968	203	—
1975	173	−2.26%
1982	155	−1.56%
1990	174	+1.46%
1999	171	−0.19%
2007	175	+0.29%
2012	186	+1.23%
2017	183	−0.32%
2023	187	+0.36%
Source: INSEE

== See also ==
- Communes of the Côte-d'Or department
