= Val-Suzon =

- Commune
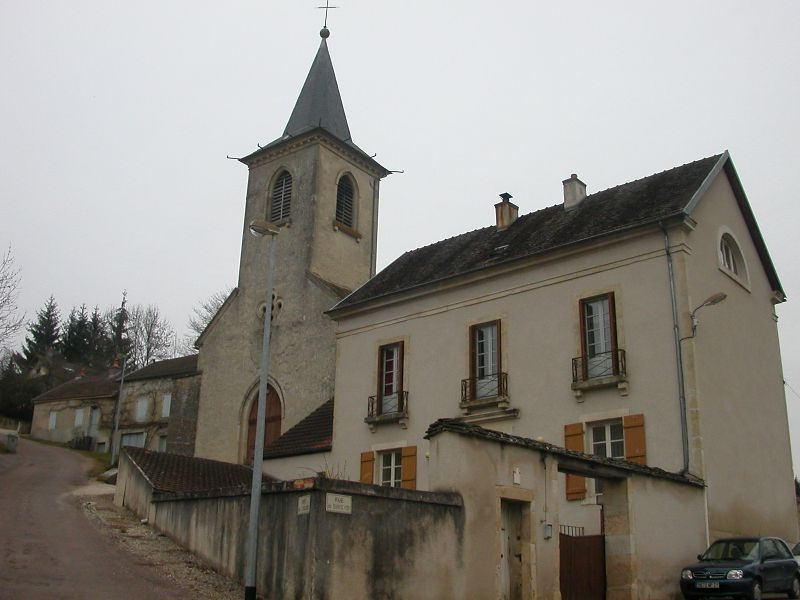
- The church in Val-Suzon

- Coat of arms
- Location of Val-Suzon
- Location within France Location within Bourgogne-Franche-Comté
- Coordinates: 47°24′29″N 4°53′39″E
- Country: France
- Region: Bourgogne-Franche-Comté
- Department: Côte-d'Or
- Arrondissement: Dijon
- Canton: Fontaine-lès-Dijon

Government
  - Mayor (2020–2026): Catherine Louis
- Area^{1}: 18.51 km^{2} (7.15 sq mi)
- Elevation: 360 m (1,180 ft)
- Highest elevation: 560 m (1,840 ft)
- Lowest elevation: 322 m (1,056 ft)
- Population (2023): 213
  - Density: 11.5/km^{2} (29.8/sq mi)
- Time zone: UTC+01:00 (CET)
  - Summer (DST): UTC+02:00 (CEST)
- INSEE/Postal code: 21651 /21121
- ^{1} French Land Register data, which excludes lakes, ponds, glaciers > 1 km^{2} (0.386 sq mi or 247 acres) and river estuaries.

Val-Suzon (French pronunciation: [val syzɔ̃]) is a commune in the Côte-d'Or department in eastern France.

== Population ==
Historical population
Year	Pop.	±% p.a.
1968	118	—
1975	109	−1.13%
1982	178	+7.26%
1990	194	+1.08%
1999	180	−0.83%
2007	216	+2.31%
2012	218	+0.18%
2017	207	−1.03%
2023	213	+0.48%
Source: INSEE

== See also ==
- Communes of the Côte-d'Or department
