= Magny-la-Ville =

- Commune
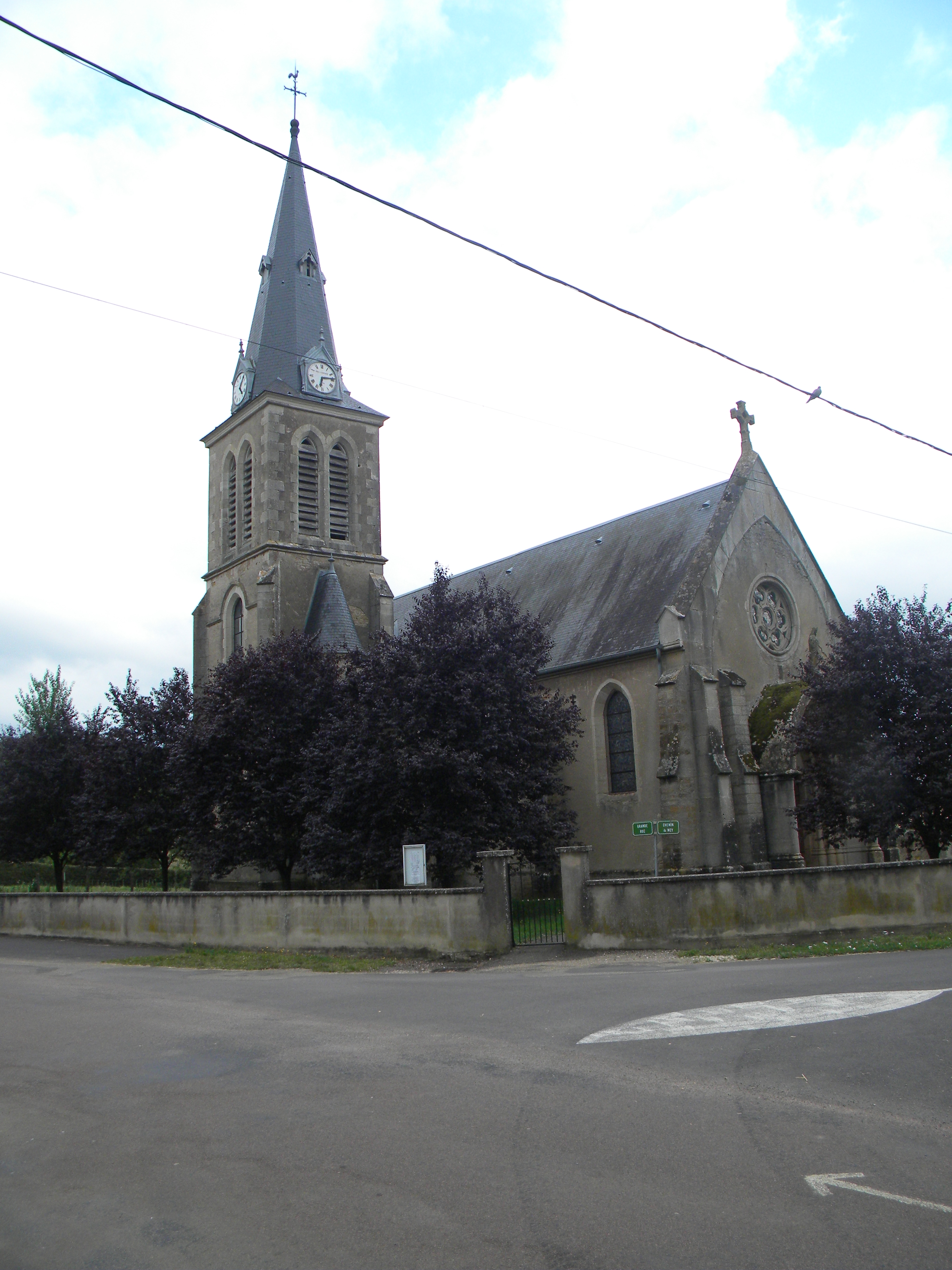
- The church in Magny-la-Ville
- Location of Magny-la-Ville
- Location within France Location within Bourgogne-Franche-Comté
- Coordinates: 47°28′57″N 4°25′47″E
- Country: France
- Region: Bourgogne-Franche-Comté
- Department: Côte-d'Or
- Arrondissement: Montbard
- Canton: Semur-en-Auxois

Government
  - Mayor (2020–2026): Carine Pernet
- Area^{1}: 3.69 km^{2} (1.42 sq mi)
- Elevation: 350 m (1,150 ft)
- Highest elevation: 431 m (1,414 ft)
- Lowest elevation: 300 m (980 ft)
- Population (2023): 72
  - Density: 20/km^{2} (51/sq mi)
- Time zone: UTC+01:00 (CET)
  - Summer (DST): UTC+02:00 (CEST)
- INSEE/Postal code: 21365 /21140
- ^{1} French Land Register data, which excludes lakes, ponds, glaciers > 1 km^{2} (0.386 sq mi or 247 acres) and river estuaries.

Magny-la-Ville (French pronunciation: [maɲi la vil]) is a commune in the Côte-d'Or department in eastern France.

== Population ==
Historical population
Year	Pop.	±% p.a.
1968	48	—
1975	54	+1.70%
1982	67	+3.13%
1990	59	−1.58%
1999	65	+1.08%
2007	83	+3.10%
2012	74	−2.27%
2017	80	+1.57%
2023	72	−1.74%
Source: INSEE

== See also ==
- Communes of the Côte-d'Or department
