= Rochefort-sur-Brévon =

- Commune
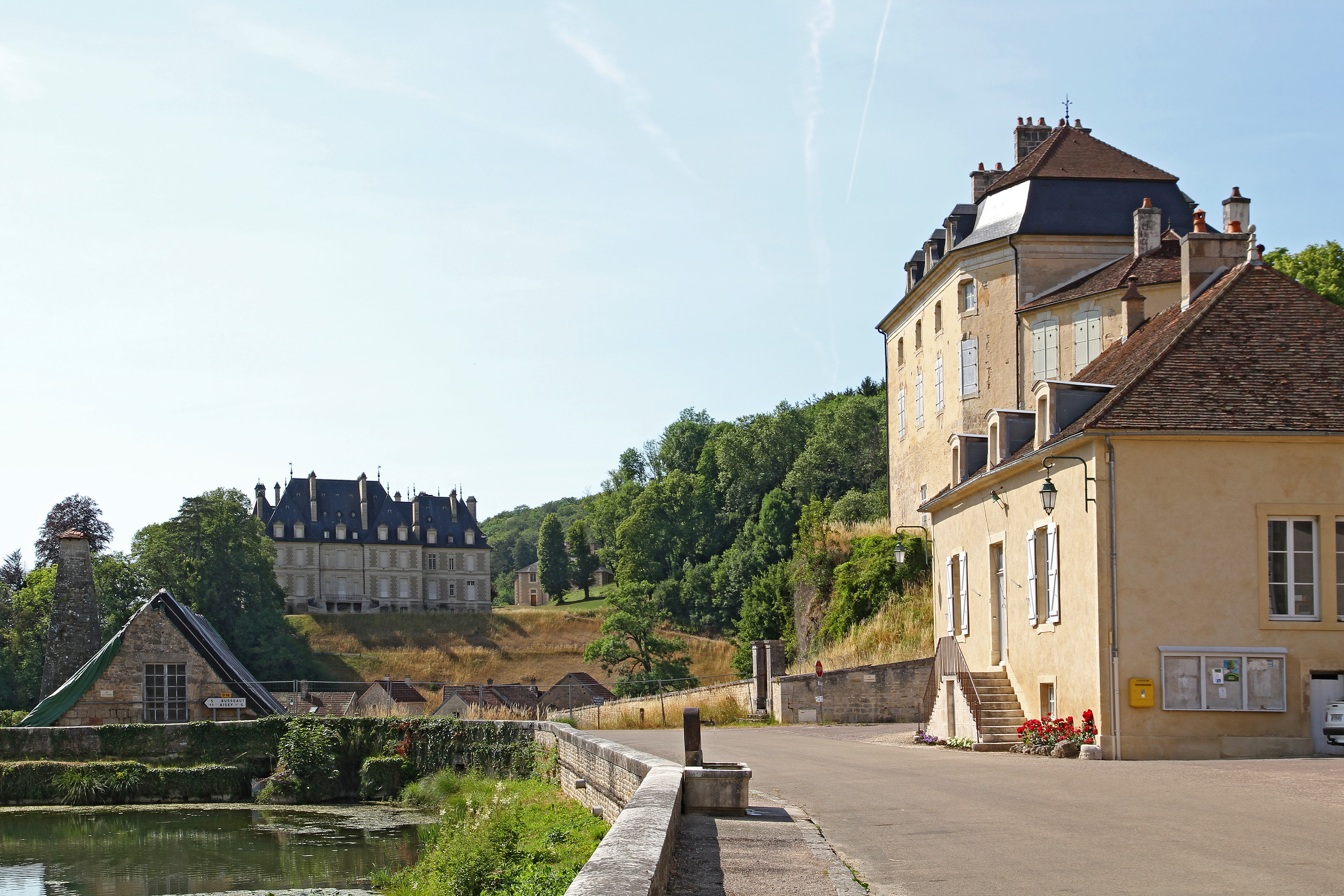
- The town hall and chateau in Rochefort-sur-Brévon

- Coat of arms
- Location of Rochefort-sur-Brévon
- Location within France Location within Bourgogne-Franche-Comté
- Coordinates: 47°44′37″N 4°42′11″E
- Country: France
- Region: Bourgogne-Franche-Comté
- Department: Côte-d'Or
- Arrondissement: Montbard
- Canton: Châtillon-sur-Seine
- Intercommunality: Pays Châtillonnais

Government
  - Mayor (2020–2026): Christian Chalier
- Area^{1}: 11.98 km^{2} (4.63 sq mi)
- Elevation: 300 m (980 ft)
- Highest elevation: 311 m (1,020 ft)
- Lowest elevation: 287 m (942 ft)
- Population (2023): 42
  - Density: 3.5/km^{2} (9.1/sq mi)
- Time zone: UTC+01:00 (CET)
  - Summer (DST): UTC+02:00 (CEST)
- INSEE/Postal code: 21526 /21510
- ^{1} French Land Register data, which excludes lakes, ponds, glaciers > 1 km^{2} (0.386 sq mi or 247 acres) and river estuaries.

Rochefort-sur-Brévon (French pronunciation: [ʁɔʃfɔʁ syʁ bʁevɔ̃], before 2003: Rochefort) is a commune in the Côte-d'Or department in eastern France.

== Population ==
Historical population
Year	Pop.	±% p.a.
1968	48	—
1975	55	+1.96%
1982	50	−1.35%
1990	65	+3.33%
1999	60	−0.89%
2007	41	−4.65%
2012	47	+2.77%
2017	39	−3.66%
2023	42	+1.24%
Source: INSEE

== See also ==
- Communes of the Côte-d'Or department
