= Orgeux =

- Commune
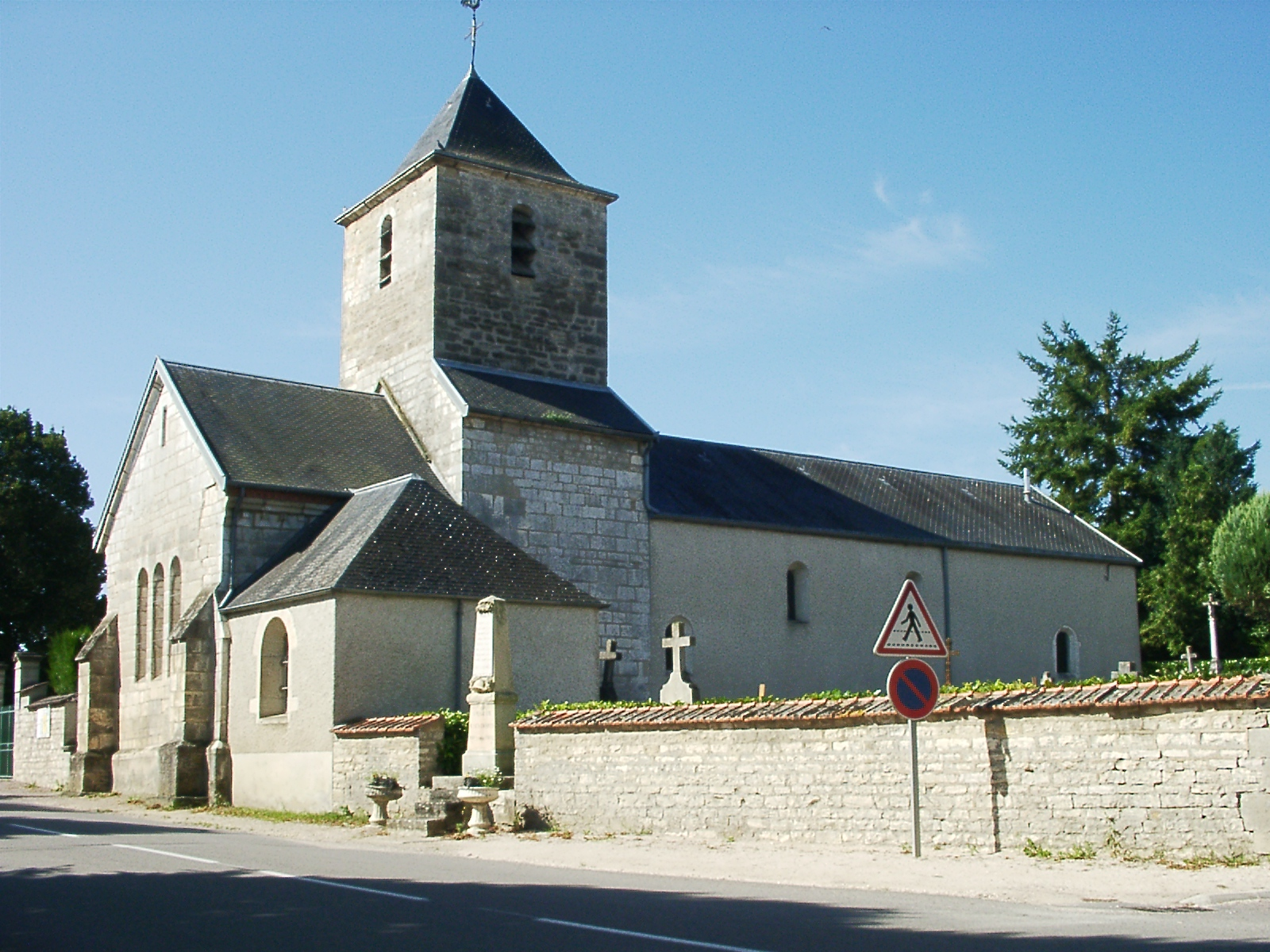
- The church in Orgeux

- Coat of arms
- Location of Orgeux
- Location within France Location within Bourgogne-Franche-Comté
- Coordinates: 47°21′47″N 5°09′17″E
- Country: France
- Region: Bourgogne-Franche-Comté
- Department: Côte-d'Or
- Arrondissement: Dijon
- Canton: Fontaine-lès-Dijon
- Intercommunality: Norge et Tille

Government
  - Mayor (2020–2026): Jacques Medeau
- Area^{1}: 4.75 km^{2} (1.83 sq mi)
- Highest elevation: 237 m (778 ft)
- Lowest elevation: 217 m (712 ft)
- Population (2023): 466
  - Density: 98.1/km^{2} (254/sq mi)
- Time zone: UTC+01:00 (CET)
  - Summer (DST): UTC+02:00 (CEST)
- INSEE/Postal code: 21469 /21490
- ^{1} French Land Register data, which excludes lakes, ponds, glaciers > 1 km^{2} (0.386 sq mi or 247 acres) and river estuaries.

Orgeux (French pronunciation: [ɔʁʒø]) is a commune in the Côte-d'Or department in eastern France.

== Population ==
Historical population
Year	Pop.	±% p.a.
1968	183	—
1975	240	+3.95%
1982	273	+1.86%
1990	258	−0.70%
1999	337	+3.01%
2007	450	+3.68%
2012	474	+1.04%
2017	465	−0.38%
2023	466	+0.04%
Source: INSEE

== See also ==
- Communes of the Côte-d'Or department
