= Clénay =

- Commune
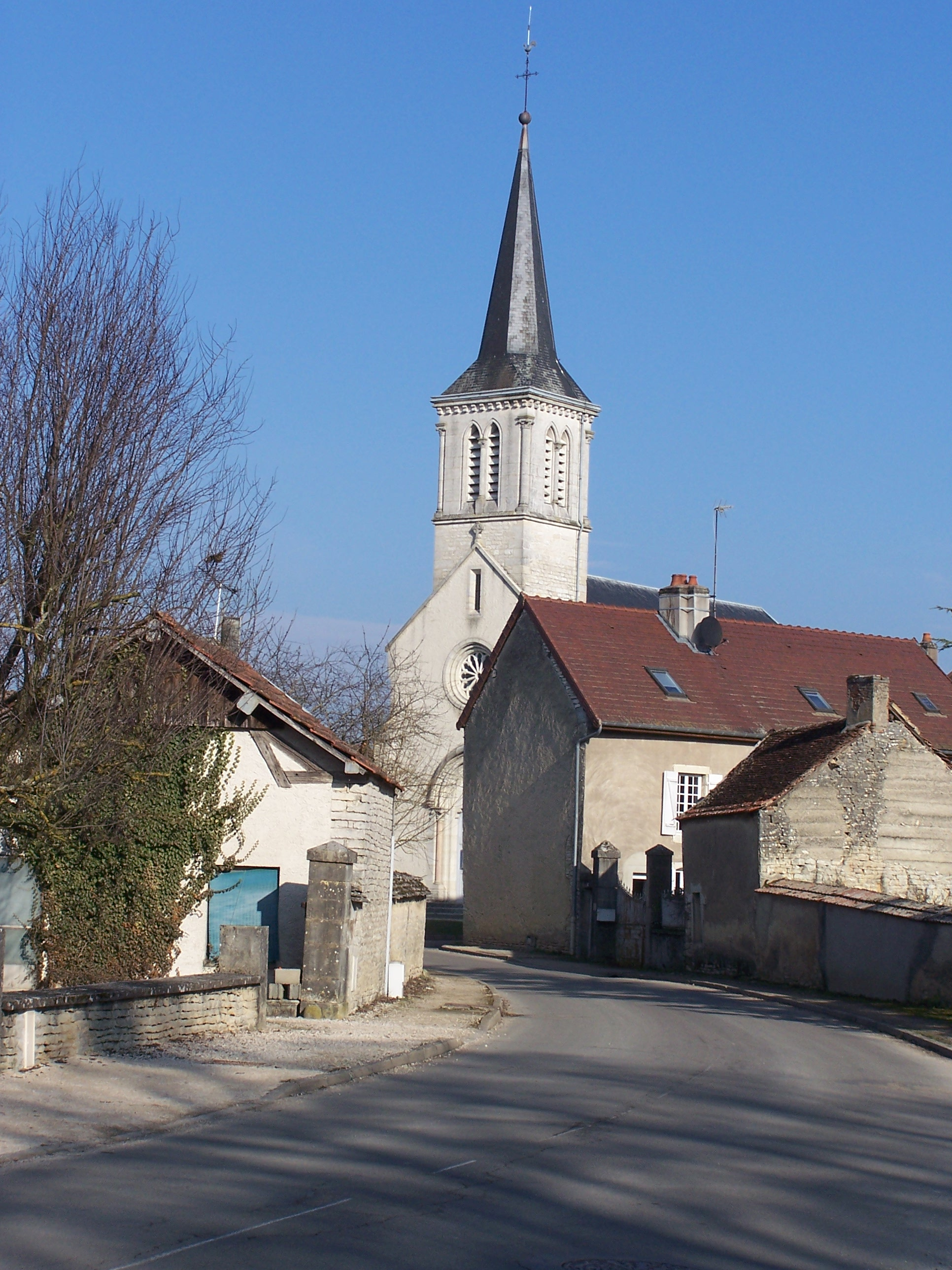
- The church in Clénay

- Coat of arms
- Location of Clénay
- Location within France Location within Bourgogne-Franche-Comté
- Coordinates: 47°24′17″N 5°07′18″E
- Country: France
- Region: Bourgogne-Franche-Comté
- Department: Côte-d'Or
- Arrondissement: Dijon
- Canton: Fontaine-lès-Dijon

Government
  - Mayor (2020–2026): Frédéric Imbert
- Area^{1}: 5.61 km^{2} (2.17 sq mi)
- Highest elevation: 316 m (1,037 ft)
- Lowest elevation: 244 m (801 ft)
- Population (2023): 891
  - Density: 159/km^{2} (411/sq mi)
- Time zone: UTC+01:00 (CET)
  - Summer (DST): UTC+02:00 (CEST)
- INSEE/Postal code: 21179 /21490
- ^{1} French Land Register data, which excludes lakes, ponds, glaciers > 1 km^{2} (0.386 sq mi or 247 acres) and river estuaries.

Clénay (French pronunciation: [klenɛ]) is a commune in the Côte-d'Or department in eastern France.

== Population ==
Historical population
Year	Pop.	±% p.a.
1968	238	—
1975	246	+0.47%
1982	379	+6.37%
1990	497	+3.45%
1999	573	+1.59%
2007	816	+4.52%
2012	850	+0.82%
2017	855	+0.12%
2023	891	+0.69%
Source: INSEE

== See also ==
- Communes of the Côte-d'Or department
