= Norges-la-Ville =

- Commune
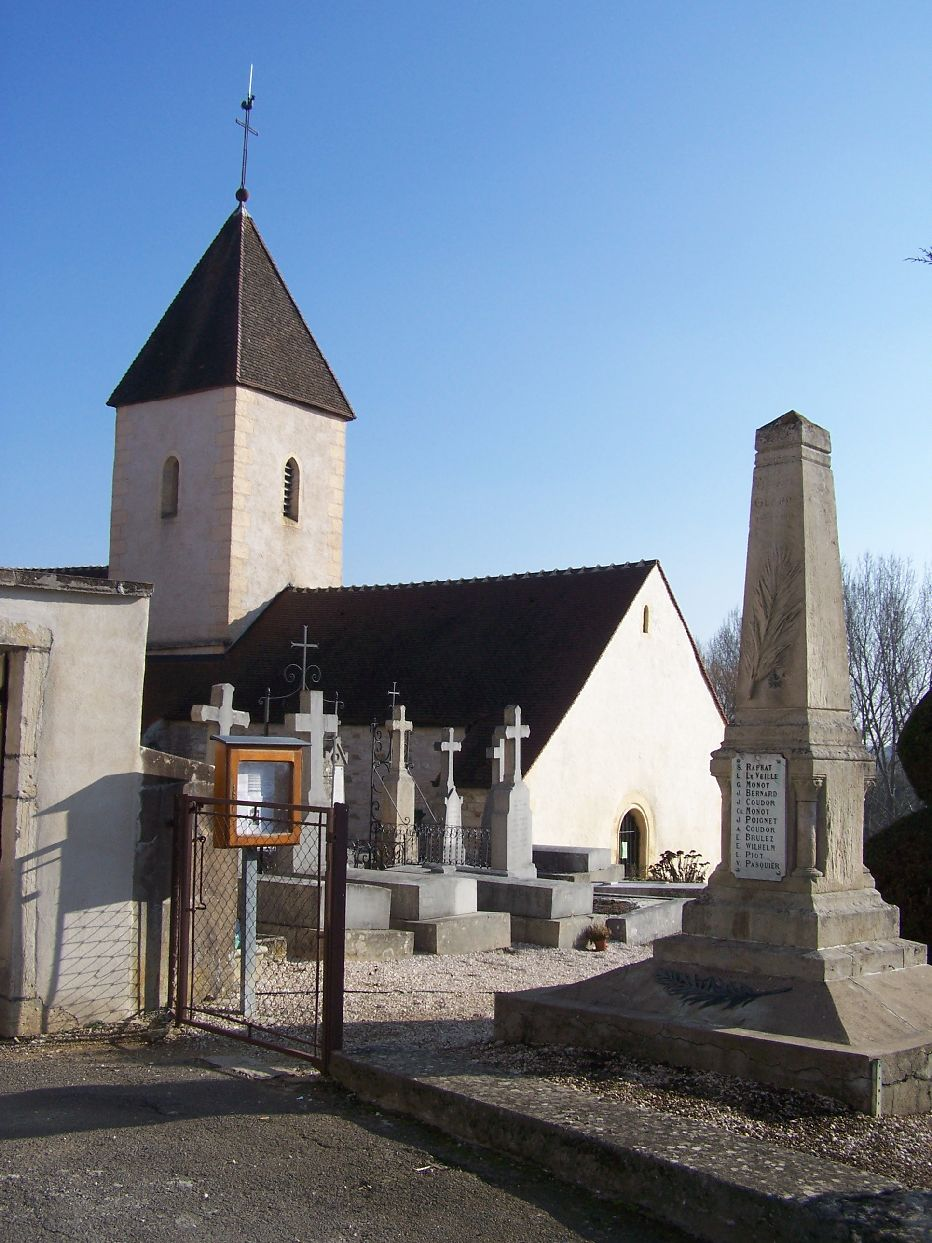
- The church in Norges-la-Ville

- Coat of arms
- Location of Norges-la-Ville
- Location within France Location within Bourgogne-Franche-Comté
- Coordinates: 47°24′30″N 5°04′39″E
- Country: France
- Region: Bourgogne-Franche-Comté
- Department: Côte-d'Or
- Arrondissement: Dijon
- Canton: Fontaine-lès-Dijon

Government
  - Mayor (2020–2026): Denis Mailler
- Area^{1}: 11 km^{2} (4.2 sq mi)
- Elevation: 243 m (797 ft)
- Highest elevation: 351 m (1,152 ft)
- Lowest elevation: 257 m (843 ft)
- Population (2023): 961
  - Density: 87/km^{2} (230/sq mi)
- Time zone: UTC+01:00 (CET)
  - Summer (DST): UTC+02:00 (CEST)
- INSEE/Postal code: 21462 /21490
- ^{1} French Land Register data, which excludes lakes, ponds, glaciers > 1 km^{2} (0.386 sq mi or 247 acres) and river estuaries.

Norges-la-Ville (French pronunciation: [nɔʁʒ la vil]) is a commune in the Côte-d'Or department in eastern France.

== Population ==
Historical population
Year	Pop.	±% p.a.
1968	224	—
1975	424	+9.54%
1982	554	+3.89%
1990	605	+1.11%
1999	839	+3.70%
2007	922	+1.19%
2012	869	−1.18%
2017	949	+1.78%
2023	961	+0.21%
Source: INSEE

== See also ==
- Communes of the Côte-d'Or department
