= Bretigny, Côte-d'Or =

Bretigny
- Commune
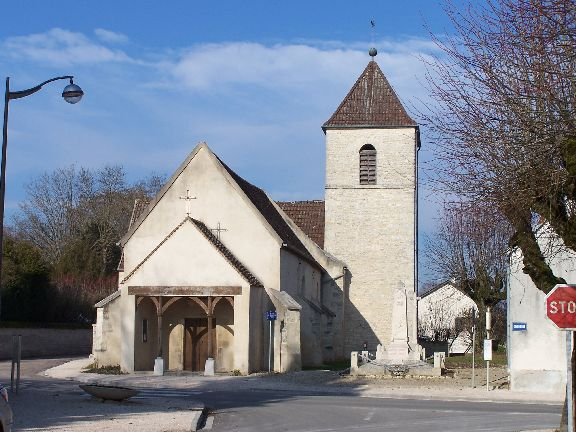
- The church in Bretigny

- Coat of arms
- Location of Bretigny
- Location within France Location within Bourgogne-Franche-Comté
- Coordinates: 47°23′57″N 5°06′12″E
- Country: France
- Region: Bourgogne-Franche-Comté
- Department: Côte-d'Or
- Arrondissement: Dijon
- Canton: Fontaine-lès-Dijon

Government
  - Mayor (2020–2026): Didier Maingault
- Area^{1}: 6.84 km^{2} (2.64 sq mi)
- Highest elevation: 288 m (945 ft)
- Lowest elevation: 232 m (761 ft)
- Population (2023): 922
  - Density: 135/km^{2} (349/sq mi)
- Time zone: UTC+01:00 (CET)
  - Summer (DST): UTC+02:00 (CEST)
- INSEE/Postal code: 21107 /21490
- ^{1} French Land Register data, which excludes lakes, ponds, glaciers > 1 km^{2} (0.386 sq mi or 247 acres) and river estuaries.

Bretigny (French pronunciation: [bʁətiɲi]) is a commune in the Côte-d'Or department in eastern France.

== Population ==
Historical population
Year	Pop.	±% p.a.
1968	359	—
1975	445	+3.12%
1982	518	+2.19%
1990	544	+0.61%
1999	716	+3.10%
2007	869	+2.45%
2012	912	+0.97%
2017	904	−0.18%
2023	922	+0.33%
Source: INSEE

== See also ==
- Communes of the Côte-d'Or department
