= Curtil-Saint-Seine =

- Commune
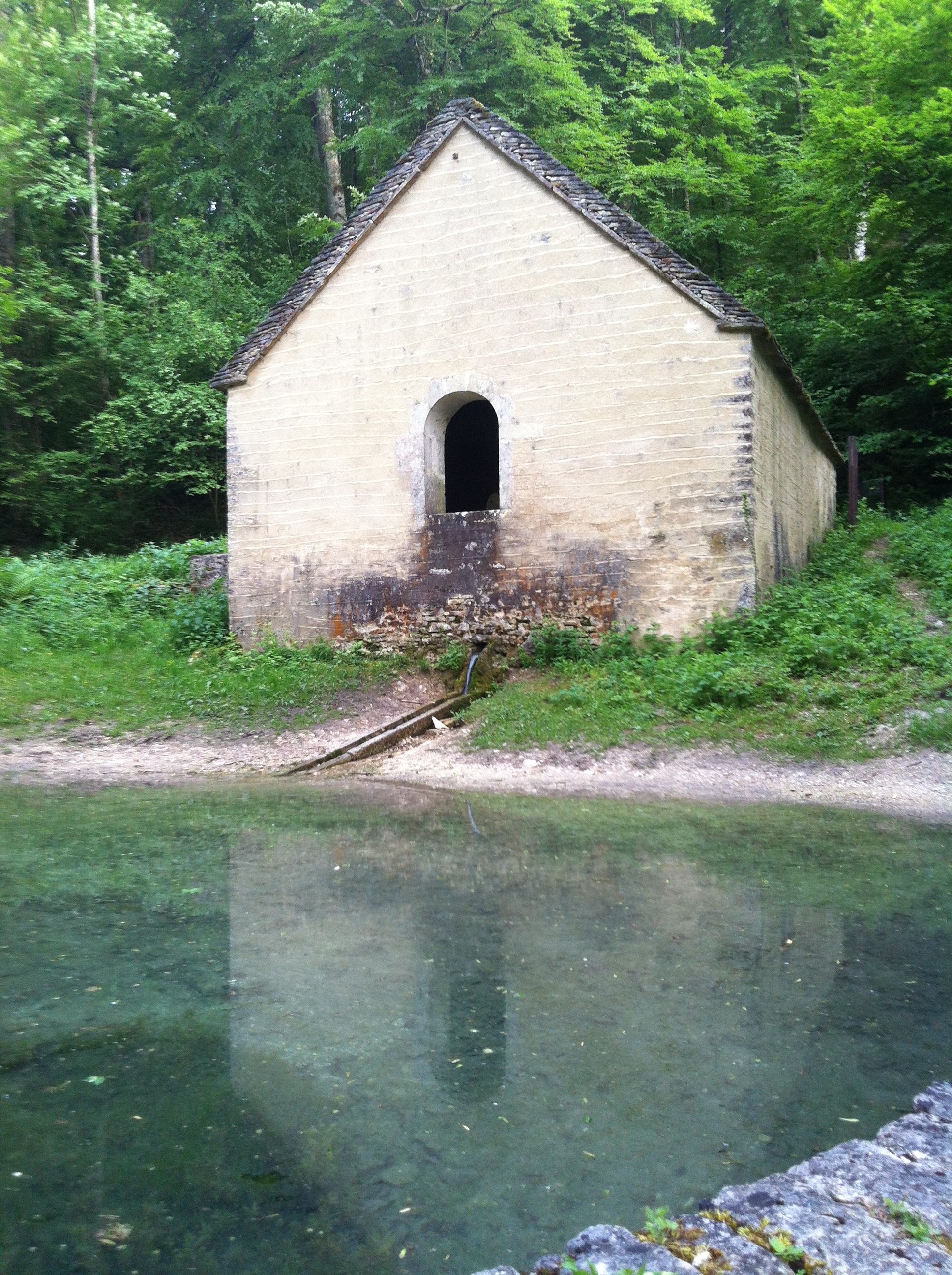
- The washhouse of Essarts
- Location of Curtil-Saint-Seine
- Location within France Location within Bourgogne-Franche-Comté
- Coordinates: 47°27′02″N 4°55′42″E
- Country: France
- Region: Bourgogne-Franche-Comté
- Department: Côte-d'Or
- Arrondissement: Dijon
- Canton: Fontaine-lès-Dijon

Government
  - Mayor (2021–2026): Yann Vaxillaire
- Area^{1}: 12.01 km^{2} (4.64 sq mi)
- Elevation: 576 m (1,890 ft)
- Highest elevation: 576 m (1,890 ft)
- Lowest elevation: 345 m (1,132 ft)
- Population (2023): 112
  - Density: 9.33/km^{2} (24.2/sq mi)
- Time zone: UTC+01:00 (CET)
  - Summer (DST): UTC+02:00 (CEST)
- INSEE/Postal code: 21218 /21380
- ^{1} French Land Register data, which excludes lakes, ponds, glaciers > 1 km^{2} (0.386 sq mi or 247 acres) and river estuaries.

Curtil-Saint-Seine (French pronunciation: [kyʁtil sɛ̃ sɛn]) is a commune in the Côte-d'Or department in eastern France.

== Population ==
Historical population
Year	Pop.	±% p.a.
1968	37	—
1975	26	−4.92%
1982	82	+17.83%
1990	90	+1.17%
1999	104	+1.62%
2007	90	−1.79%
2012	99	+1.92%
2017	117	+3.40%
2023	112	−0.73%
Source: INSEE

== See also ==
- Communes of the Côte-d'Or department
