= Villotte-Saint-Seine =

- Commune
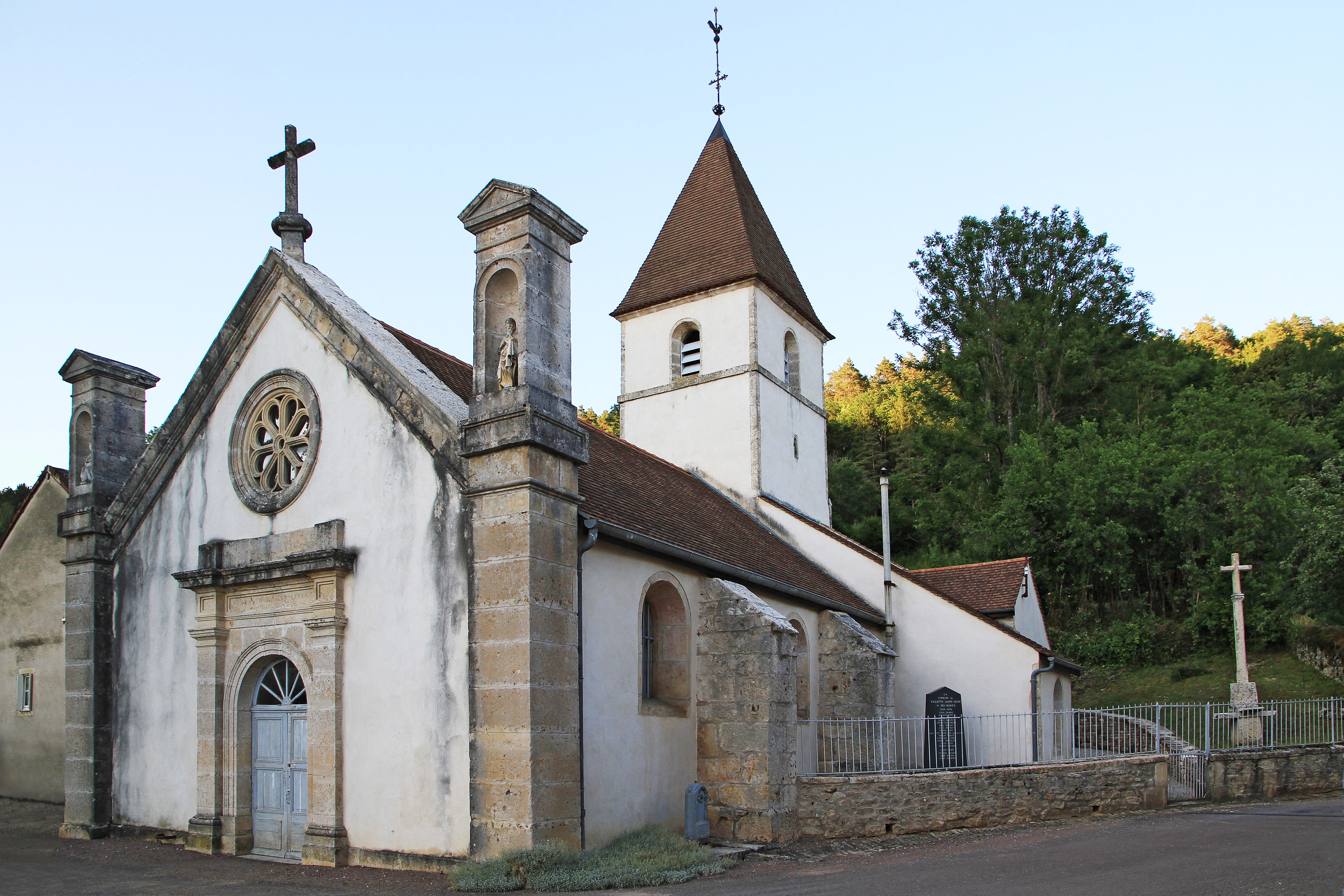
- The church in Villotte-Saint-Seine
- Location of Villotte-Saint-Seine
- Location within France Location within Bourgogne-Franche-Comté
- Coordinates: 47°25′47″N 4°42′24″E
- Country: France
- Region: Bourgogne-Franche-Comté
- Department: Côte-d'Or
- Arrondissement: Dijon
- Canton: Fontaine-lès-Dijon

Government
  - Mayor (2023–2026): Sandra Graillot
- Area^{1}: 7.59 km^{2} (2.93 sq mi)
- Elevation: 350 m (1,150 ft)
- Highest elevation: 551 m (1,808 ft)
- Lowest elevation: 338 m (1,109 ft)
- Population (2023): 65
  - Density: 8.6/km^{2} (22/sq mi)
- Time zone: UTC+01:00 (CET)
  - Summer (DST): UTC+02:00 (CEST)
- INSEE/Postal code: 21705 /21690
- ^{1} French Land Register data, which excludes lakes, ponds, glaciers > 1 km^{2} (0.386 sq mi or 247 acres) and river estuaries.

Villotte-Saint-Seine (French pronunciation: [vilɔt sɛ̃ sɛn]) is a commune in the Côte-d'Or department in eastern France.

== Population ==
Historical population
Year	Pop.	±% p.a.
1968	109	—
1975	88	−3.01%
1982	61	−5.10%
1990	50	−2.45%
1999	74	+4.45%
2007	67	−1.23%
2012	56	−3.52%
2017	76	+6.30%
2023	65	−2.57%
Source: INSEE

== See also ==
- Communes of the Côte-d'Or department
