= Normier =

- Commune
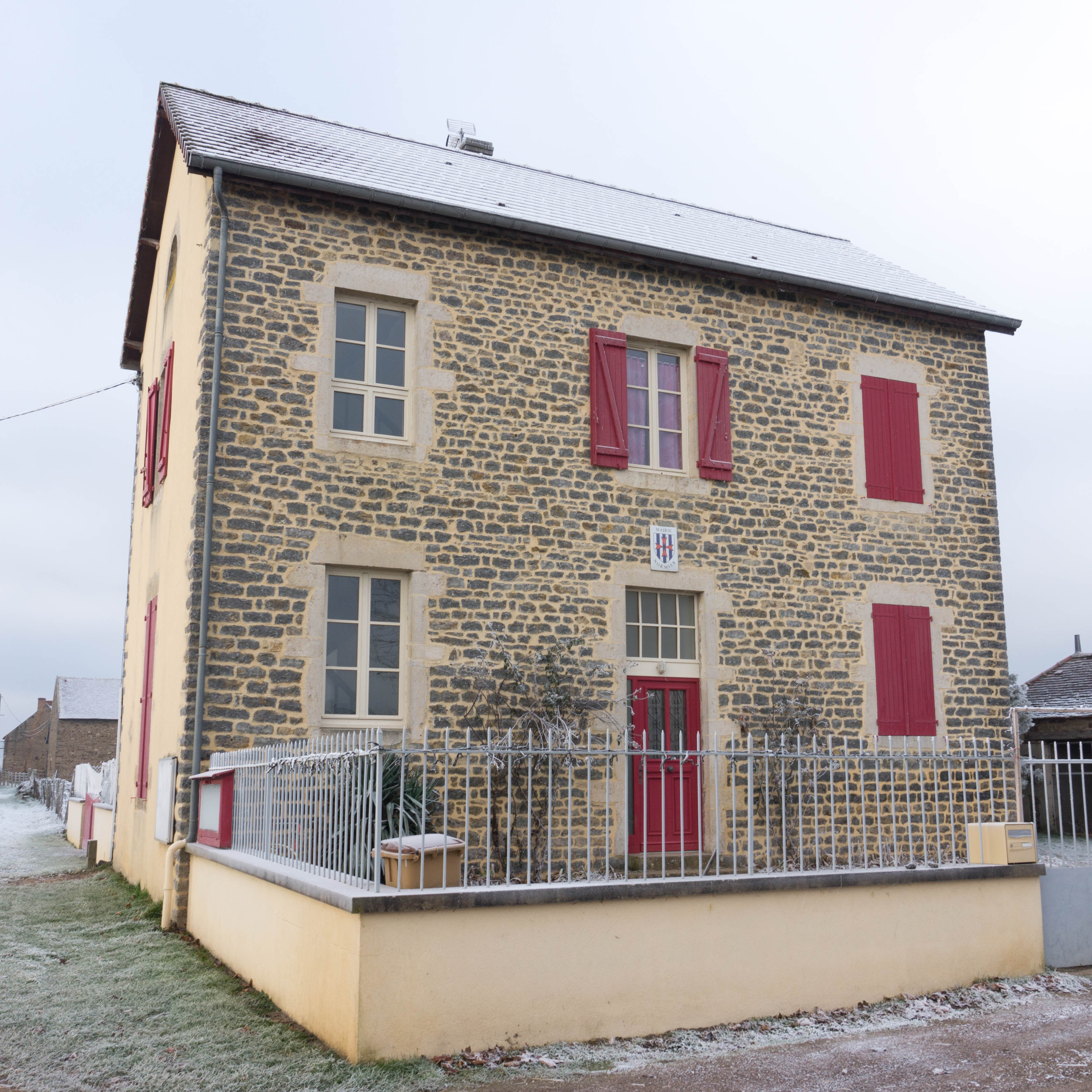
- The town hall in Normier

- Coat of arms
- Location of Normier
- Location within France Location within Bourgogne-Franche-Comté
- Coordinates: 47°22′05″N 4°26′09″E
- Country: France
- Region: Bourgogne-Franche-Comté
- Department: Côte-d'Or
- Arrondissement: Montbard
- Canton: Semur-en-Auxois

Government
  - Mayor (2020–2026): Denis Masson
- Area^{1}: 5.1 km^{2} (2.0 sq mi)
- Elevation: 367 m (1,204 ft)
- Highest elevation: 367 m (1,204 ft)
- Lowest elevation: 322 m (1,056 ft)
- Population (2023): 63
  - Density: 12/km^{2} (32/sq mi)
- Time zone: UTC+01:00 (CET)
  - Summer (DST): UTC+02:00 (CEST)
- INSEE/Postal code: 21463 /21390
- ^{1} French Land Register data, which excludes lakes, ponds, glaciers > 1 km^{2} (0.386 sq mi or 247 acres) and river estuaries.

Normier (French pronunciation: [nɔʁmje]) is a commune in the Côte-d'Or department in eastern France.

== Population ==
Historical population
Year	Pop.	±% p.a.
1968	41	—
1975	36	−1.84%
1982	50	+4.80%
1990	47	−0.77%
1999	47	+0.00%
2007	47	+0.00%
2012	50	+1.25%
2017	47	−1.23%
2023	63	+5.00%
Source: INSEE

== See also ==
- Communes of the Côte-d'Or department
