= Panges =

- Commune
- Coat of arms
- Location of Panges
- Location within France Location within Bourgogne-Franche-Comté
- Coordinates: 47°22′16″N 4°47′57″E
- Country: France
- Region: Bourgogne-Franche-Comté
- Department: Côte-d'Or
- Arrondissement: Dijon
- Canton: Fontaine-lès-Dijon

Government
  - Mayor (2020–2026): Christophe Dequesne
- Area^{1}: 6.06 km^{2} (2.34 sq mi)
- Elevation: 575 m (1,886 ft)
- Highest elevation: 586 m (1,923 ft)
- Lowest elevation: 448 m (1,470 ft)
- Population (2023): 85
  - Density: 14/km^{2} (36/sq mi)
- Time zone: UTC+01:00 (CET)
  - Summer (DST): UTC+02:00 (CEST)
- INSEE/Postal code: 21477 /21540
- ^{1} French Land Register data, which excludes lakes, ponds, glaciers > 1 km^{2} (0.386 sq mi or 247 acres) and river estuaries.

Panges (French pronunciation: [pɑ̃ʒ]) is a commune in the Côte-d'Or department in eastern France.

== Population ==
Historical population
Year	Pop.	±% p.a.
1968	79	—
1975	61	−3.63%
1982	61	+0.00%
1990	71	+1.92%
1999	74	+0.46%
2007	77	+0.50%
2012	85	+2.00%
2017	88	+0.70%
2023	85	−0.58%
Source: INSEE

== See also ==
- Communes of the Côte-d'Or department
