= Saint-Martin-du-Mont, Côte-d'Or =

Saint-Martin-du-Mont
- Commune
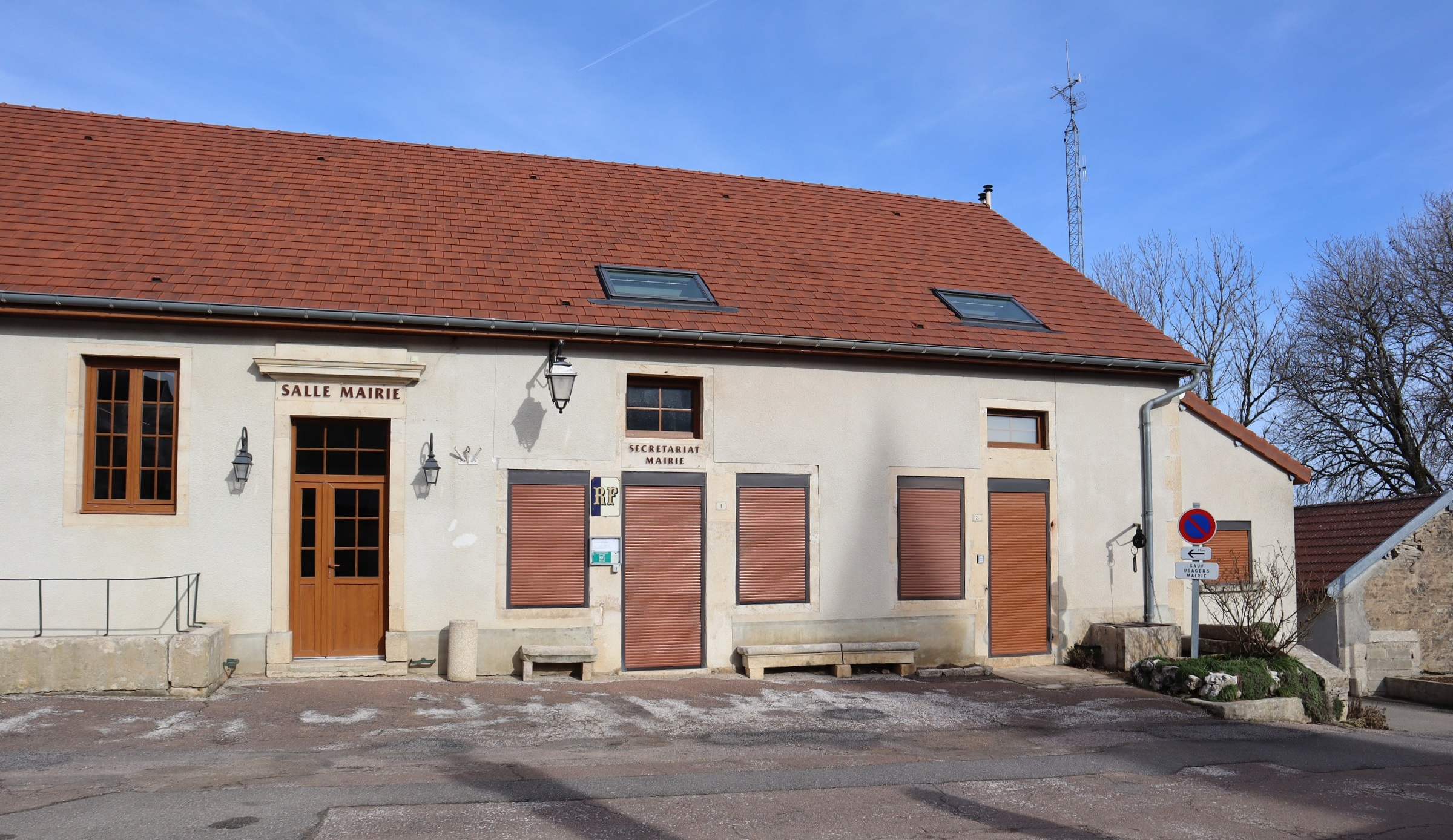
- Town hall
- Location of Saint-Martin-du-Mont
- Location within France Location within Bourgogne-Franche-Comté
- Coordinates: 47°26′02″N 4°47′13″E
- Country: France
- Region: Bourgogne-Franche-Comté
- Department: Côte-d'Or
- Arrondissement: Dijon
- Canton: Fontaine-lès-Dijon

Government
  - Mayor (2020–2026): Denis Mairet
- Area^{1}: 37.84 km^{2} (14.61 sq mi)
- Elevation: 550 m (1,800 ft)
- Highest elevation: 591 m (1,939 ft)
- Lowest elevation: 385 m (1,263 ft)
- Population (2023): 463
  - Density: 12.2/km^{2} (31.7/sq mi)
- Time zone: UTC+01:00 (CET)
  - Summer (DST): UTC+02:00 (CEST)
- INSEE/Postal code: 21561 /21440
- ^{1} French Land Register data, which excludes lakes, ponds, glaciers > 1 km^{2} (0.386 sq mi or 247 acres) and river estuaries.

Saint-Martin-du-Mont (French pronunciation: [sɛ̃ maʁtɛ̃ dy mɔ̃]) is a commune in the Côte-d'Or department in eastern France.

== Geography ==
=== Climate ===
Saint-Martin-du-Mont has an oceanic climate (Köppen climate classification Cfb). The average annual temperature in Saint-Martin-du-Mont is 9.6 °C (49.3 °F). The average annual rainfall is 962.7 mm (37.90 in) with November as the wettest month. The temperatures are highest on average in July, at around 18.4 °C (65.1 °F), and lowest in January, at around 1.6 °C (34.9 °F). The highest temperature ever recorded in Saint-Martin-du-Mont was 37.4 °C (99.3 °F) on 12 August 2003; the coldest temperature ever recorded was −15.7 °C (3.7 °F) on 20 December 2009.

Climate data for Saint-Martin-du-Mont (1981–2010 averages, extremes 1992−present)
Month	Jan	Feb	Mar	Apr	May	Jun	Jul	Aug	Sep	Oct	Nov	Dec	Year
Record high °C (°F)	14.9 (58.8)	22.2 (72.0)	23.2 (73.8)	26.5 (79.7)	28.7 (83.7)	36.0 (96.8)	37.2 (99.0)	37.4 (99.3)	31.9 (89.4)	25.1 (77.2)	20.4 (68.7)	14.5 (58.1)	37.4 (99.3)
Mean daily maximum °C (°F)	4.1 (39.4)	5.5 (41.9)	9.3 (48.7)	13.0 (55.4)	17.2 (63.0)	21.2 (70.2)	23.6 (74.5)	22.9 (73.2)	18.1 (64.6)	13.7 (56.7)	7.7 (45.9)	4.3 (39.7)	13.4 (56.1)
Daily mean °C (°F)	1.6 (34.9)	2.5 (36.5)	5.5 (41.9)	8.6 (47.5)	12.7 (54.9)	16.1 (61.0)	18.4 (65.1)	18.2 (64.8)	14.0 (57.2)	10.3 (50.5)	5.0 (41.0)	2.0 (35.6)	9.6 (49.3)
Mean daily minimum °C (°F)	−1.0 (30.2)	−0.5 (31.1)	1.7 (35.1)	4.3 (39.7)	8.2 (46.8)	11.1 (52.0)	13.1 (55.6)	13.5 (56.3)	9.9 (49.8)	6.9 (44.4)	2.4 (36.3)	−0.4 (31.3)	5.8 (42.4)
Record low °C (°F)	−13.7 (7.3)	−15.5 (4.1)	−15.0 (5.0)	−6.9 (19.6)	−1.0 (30.2)	2.0 (35.6)	6.0 (42.8)	4.6 (40.3)	0.8 (33.4)	−4.6 (23.7)	−9.5 (14.9)	−15.7 (3.7)	−15.7 (3.7)
Average precipitation mm (inches)	82.4 (3.24)	69.3 (2.73)	63.7 (2.51)	75.1 (2.96)	90.2 (3.55)	79.8 (3.14)	79.9 (3.15)	74.3 (2.93)	82.2 (3.24)	87.3 (3.44)	95.7 (3.77)	82.8 (3.26)	962.7 (37.90)
Average precipitation days (≥ 1.0 mm)	12.8	11.0	10.8	11.3	12.3	9.7	10.4	9.6	10.2	12.4	13.3	13.3	137.1
Source: Meteociel

== Population ==
Historical population
Year	Pop.	±% p.a.
1968	305	—
1975	262	−2.15%
1982	285	+1.21%
1990	332	+1.93%
1999	354	+0.72%
2007	436	+2.64%
2012	451	+0.68%
2017	435	−0.72%
2023	463	+1.05%
Source: INSEE

== See also ==
- Communes of the Côte-d'Or department
