= Montberthault =

- Commune
- Location of Montberthault
- Location within France Location within Bourgogne-Franche-Comté
- Coordinates: 47°28′10″N 4°09′34″E
- Country: France
- Region: Bourgogne-Franche-Comté
- Department: Côte-d'Or
- Arrondissement: Montbard
- Canton: Semur-en-Auxois

Government
  - Mayor (2020–2026): Franck Debeaupuis
- Area^{1}: 12.12 km^{2} (4.68 sq mi)
- Elevation: 304 m (997 ft)
- Highest elevation: 347 m (1,138 ft)
- Lowest elevation: 242 m (794 ft)
- Population (2023): 226
  - Density: 18.6/km^{2} (48.3/sq mi)
- Time zone: UTC+01:00 (CET)
  - Summer (DST): UTC+02:00 (CEST)
- INSEE/Postal code: 21426 /21460
- ^{1} French Land Register data, which excludes lakes, ponds, glaciers > 1 km^{2} (0.386 sq mi or 247 acres) and river estuaries.

Montberthault (French pronunciation: [mɔ̃bɛʁto]) is a commune in the Côte-d'Or department in eastern France.

== Population ==
Historical population
Year	Pop.	±% p.a.
1968	260	—
1975	226	−1.98%
1982	256	+1.80%
1990	224	−1.66%
1999	238	+0.68%
2007	246	+0.41%
2012	238	−0.66%
2017	211	−2.38%
2023	226	+1.15%
Source: INSEE

== See also ==
- Communes of the Côte-d'Or department
