= Saussy =

- Commune
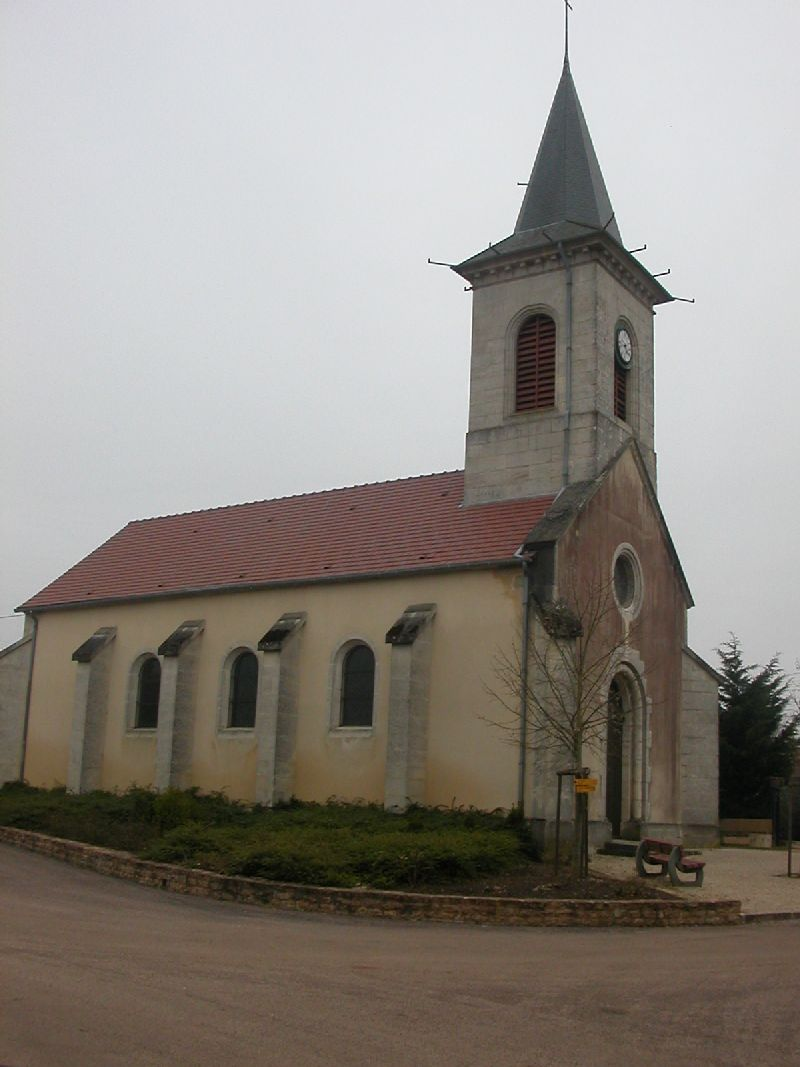
- The church in Saussy
- Location of Saussy
- Location within France Location within Bourgogne-Franche-Comté
- Coordinates: 47°28′08″N 4°57′46″E
- Country: France
- Region: Bourgogne-Franche-Comté
- Department: Côte-d'Or
- Arrondissement: Dijon
- Canton: Fontaine-lès-Dijon

Government
  - Mayor (2020–2026): Raymond Dumont
- Area^{1}: 9.3 km^{2} (3.6 sq mi)
- Elevation: 585 m (1,919 ft)
- Highest elevation: 564 m (1,850 ft)
- Lowest elevation: 369 m (1,211 ft)
- Population (2023): 99
  - Density: 11/km^{2} (28/sq mi)
- Time zone: UTC+01:00 (CET)
  - Summer (DST): UTC+02:00 (CEST)
- INSEE/Postal code: 21589 /21380
- ^{1} French Land Register data, which excludes lakes, ponds, glaciers > 1 km^{2} (0.386 sq mi or 247 acres) and river estuaries.

Saussy (French pronunciation: [sosi]) is a commune in the Côte-d'Or department in eastern France.

== Population ==
Historical population
Year	Pop.	±% p.a.
1968	62	—
1975	56	−1.44%
1982	107	+9.69%
1990	116	+1.01%
1999	104	−1.21%
2007	104	+0.00%
2012	93	−2.21%
2017	103	+2.06%
2023	99	−0.66%
Source: INSEE

== See also ==
- Communes of the Côte-d'Or department
