= Bligny-le-Sec =

- Commune
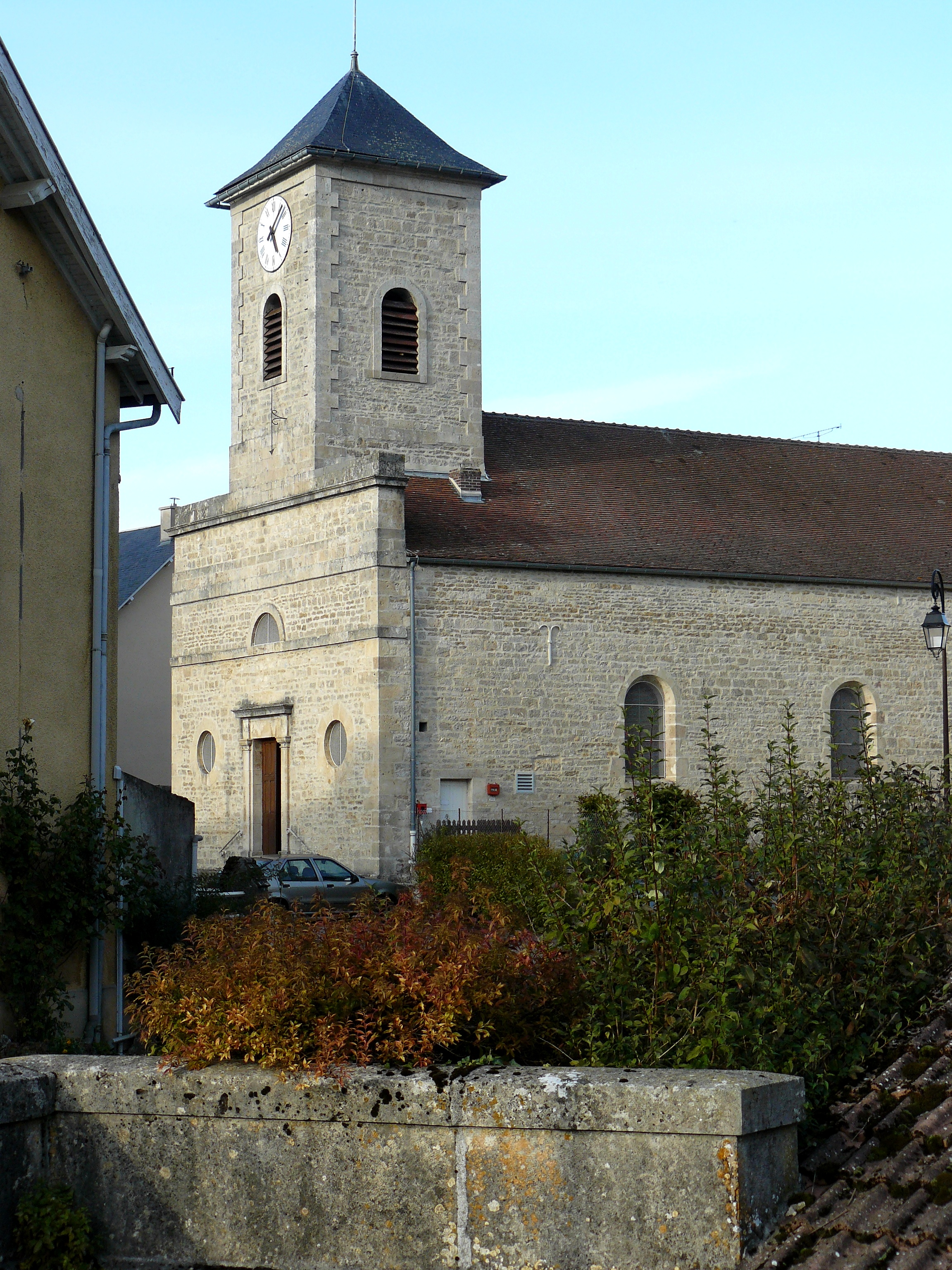
- The church in Bligny-le-Sec
- Location of Bligny-le-Sec
- Location within France Location within Bourgogne-Franche-Comté
- Coordinates: 47°26′41″N 4°44′33″E
- Country: France
- Region: Bourgogne-Franche-Comté
- Department: Côte-d'Or
- Arrondissement: Dijon
- Canton: Fontaine-lès-Dijon

Government
  - Mayor (2020–2026): Jean-Charles Baudion
- Area^{1}: 16.61 km^{2} (6.41 sq mi)
- Elevation: 550 m (1,800 ft)
- Highest elevation: 579 m (1,900 ft)
- Lowest elevation: 458 m (1,503 ft)
- Population (2023): 145
  - Density: 8.73/km^{2} (22.6/sq mi)
- Time zone: UTC+01:00 (CET)
  - Summer (DST): UTC+02:00 (CEST)
- INSEE/Postal code: 21085 /21440
- ^{1} French Land Register data, which excludes lakes, ponds, glaciers > 1 km^{2} (0.386 sq mi or 247 acres) and river estuaries.

Bligny-le-Sec (French pronunciation: [bliɲi lə sɛk]) is a commune in the Côte-d'Or department in eastern France.

== Population ==
Historical population
Year	Pop.	±% p.a.
1968	163	—
1975	140	−2.15%
1982	131	−0.94%
1990	110	−2.16%
1999	127	+1.61%
2007	164	+3.25%
2012	159	−0.62%
2017	148	−1.42%
2023	145	−0.34%
Source: INSEE

== Places of interest ==
- A 19th century wash house.
- Saint-Georges church

== See also ==
- Communes of the Côte-d'Or department
