= Chaume-lès-Baigneux =

- Commune
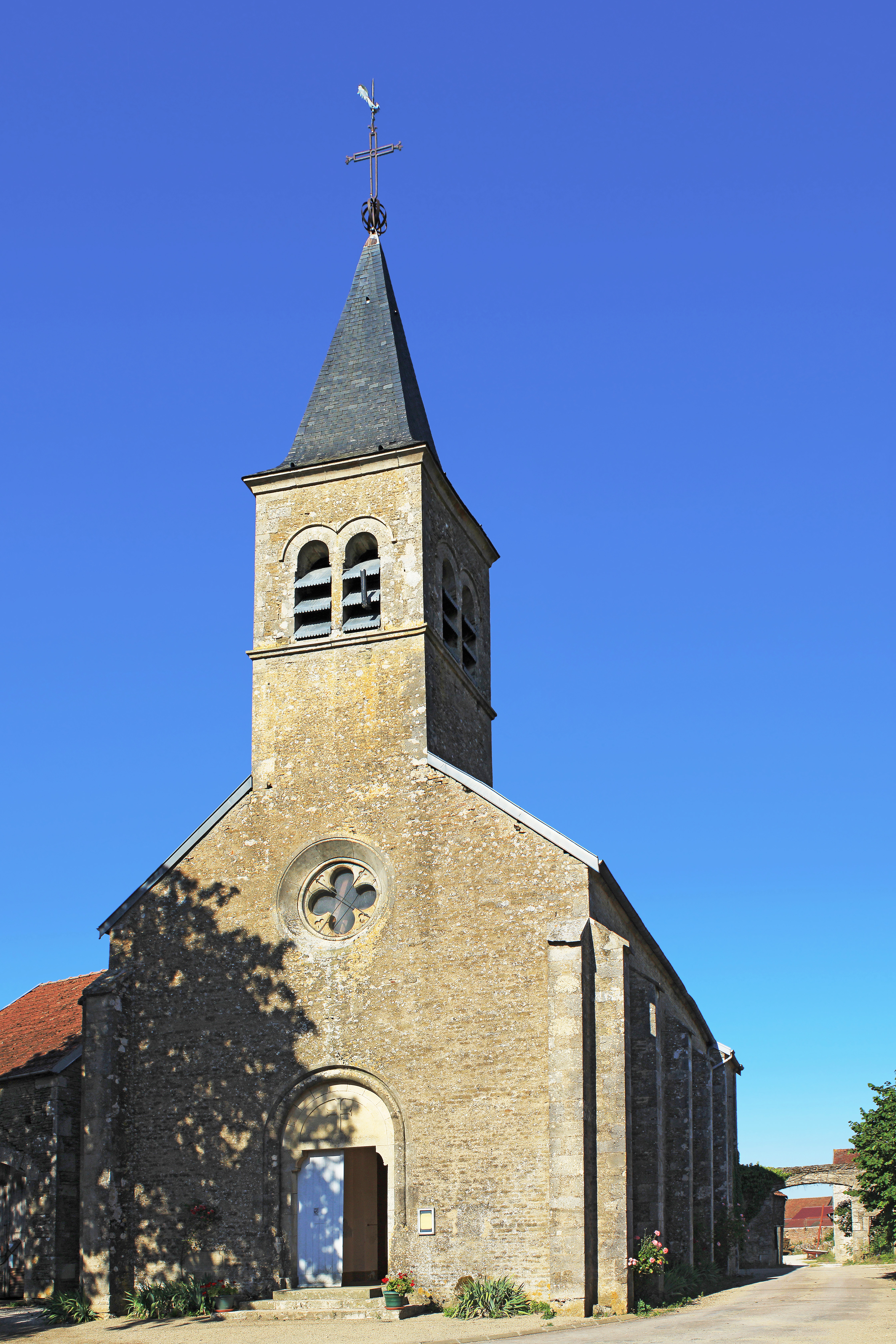
- The church in Chaume-lès-Baigneux
- Location of Chaume-lès-Baigneux
- Location within France Location within Bourgogne-Franche-Comté
- Coordinates: 47°37′42″N 4°35′03″E
- Country: France
- Region: Bourgogne-Franche-Comté
- Department: Côte-d'Or
- Arrondissement: Montbard
- Canton: Châtillon-sur-Seine
- Intercommunality: Pays Châtillonnais

Government
  - Mayor (2020–2026): Michel Franck
- Area^{1}: 12.66 km^{2} (4.89 sq mi)
- Elevation: 350 m (1,150 ft)
- Highest elevation: 424 m (1,391 ft)
- Lowest elevation: 344 m (1,129 ft)
- Population (2023): 101
  - Density: 7.98/km^{2} (20.7/sq mi)
- Time zone: UTC+01:00 (CET)
  - Summer (DST): UTC+02:00 (CEST)
- INSEE/Postal code: 21160 /21450
- ^{1} French Land Register data, which excludes lakes, ponds, glaciers > 1 km^{2} (0.386 sq mi or 247 acres) and river estuaries.

Chaume-lès-Baigneux (French pronunciation: [ʃom lɛ bɛɲø], literally Chaume near Baigneux) is a commune in the Côte-d'Or department in eastern France.

== Population ==
Historical population
Year	Pop.	±% p.a.
1968	100	—
1975	100	+0.00%
1982	105	+0.70%
1990	90	−1.91%
1999	89	−0.12%
2007	86	−0.43%
2012	96	+2.22%
2017	93	−0.63%
2023	101	+1.38%
Source: INSEE

== See also ==
- Communes of the Côte-d'Or department
