= Étaules, Côte-d'Or =

Étaules
- Commune
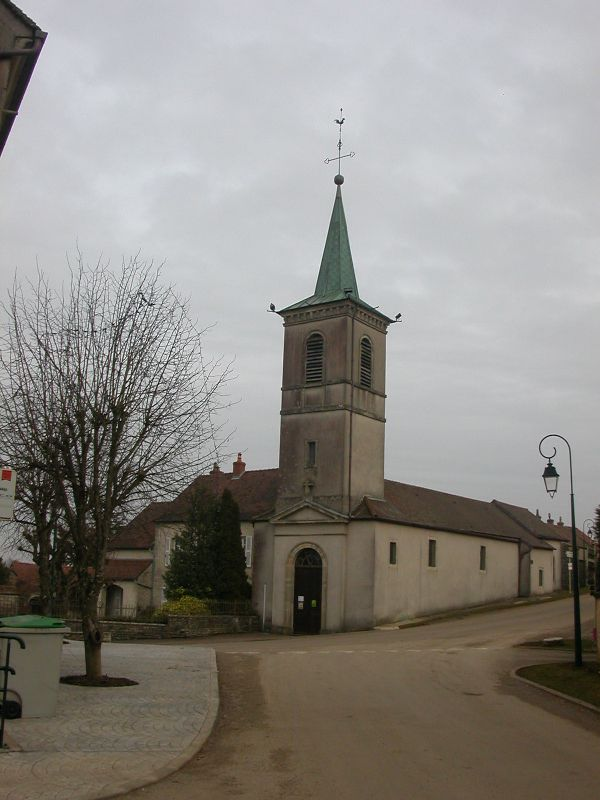
- The church in Étaules

- Coat of arms
- Location of Étaules
- Location within France Location within Bourgogne-Franche-Comté
- Coordinates: 47°24′28″N 4°56′41″E
- Country: France
- Region: Bourgogne-Franche-Comté
- Department: Côte-d'Or
- Arrondissement: Dijon
- Canton: Fontaine-lès-Dijon

Government
  - Mayor (2020–2026): Jean-René Estivalet
- Area^{1}: 16.71 km^{2} (6.45 sq mi)
- Elevation: 500 m (1,600 ft)
- Highest elevation: 543 m (1,781 ft)
- Lowest elevation: 302 m (991 ft)
- Population (2023): 339
  - Density: 20.3/km^{2} (52.5/sq mi)
- Time zone: UTC+01:00 (CET)
  - Summer (DST): UTC+02:00 (CEST)
- INSEE/Postal code: 21255 /21121
- ^{1} French Land Register data, which excludes lakes, ponds, glaciers > 1 km^{2} (0.386 sq mi or 247 acres) and river estuaries.

Étaules (French pronunciation: [etol]) is a commune in the Côte-d'Or department in eastern France.

== Population ==
Historical population
Year	Pop.	±% p.a.
1968	90	—
1975	157	+8.27%
1982	221	+5.01%
1990	242	+1.14%
1999	262	+0.89%
2007	246	−0.78%
2012	256	+0.80%
2017	300	+3.22%
2023	339	+2.06%
Source: INSEE

== See also ==
- Communes of the Côte-d'Or department
