= Bellefond, Côte-d'Or =

Bellefond
- Commune
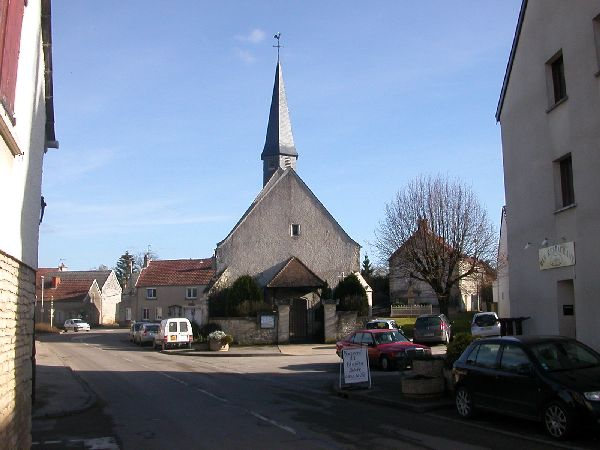
- The church in Bellefond

- Coat of arms
- Location of Bellefond
- Location within France Location within Bourgogne-Franche-Comté
- Coordinates: 47°22′50″N 5°04′14″E
- Country: France
- Region: Bourgogne-Franche-Comté
- Department: Côte-d'Or
- Arrondissement: Dijon
- Canton: Fontaine-lès-Dijon
- Intercommunality: Norge et Tille

Government
  - Mayor (2020–2026): Philippe Meunier
- Area^{1}: 2.47 km^{2} (0.95 sq mi)
- Elevation: 296 m (971 ft)
- Highest elevation: 324 m (1,063 ft)
- Lowest elevation: 269 m (883 ft)
- Population (2023): 918
  - Density: 372/km^{2} (963/sq mi)
- Time zone: UTC+01:00 (CET)
  - Summer (DST): UTC+02:00 (CEST)
- INSEE/Postal code: 21059 /21490
- ^{1} French Land Register data, which excludes lakes, ponds, glaciers > 1 km^{2} (0.386 sq mi or 247 acres) and river estuaries.

Bellefond (French pronunciation: [bɛlfɔ̃]) is a commune in the Côte-d'Or department in eastern France.

== Population ==
Historical population
Year	Pop.	±% p.a.
1968	209	—
1975	274	+3.94%
1982	481	+8.37%
1990	677	+4.37%
1999	724	+0.75%
2007	812	+1.44%
2012	763	−1.24%
2017	866	+2.56%
2023	918	+0.98%
Source: INSEE

== See also ==
- Communes of the Côte-d'Or department
