= Flacey, Côte-d'Or =

Flacey
- Commune
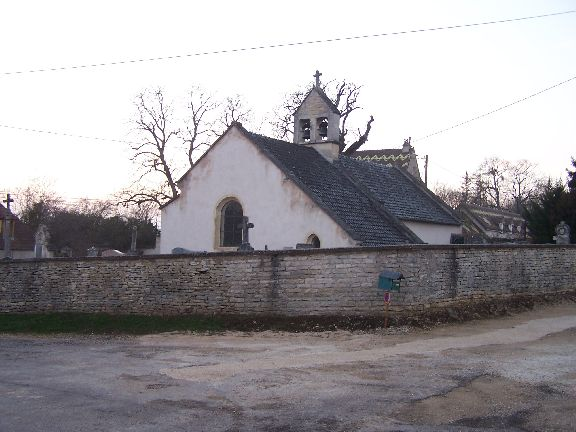
- The church in Flacey

- Coat of arms
- Location of Flacey
- Location within France Location within Bourgogne-Franche-Comté
- Coordinates: 47°25′50″N 5°08′58″E
- Country: France
- Region: Bourgogne-Franche-Comté
- Department: Côte-d'Or
- Arrondissement: Dijon
- Canton: Fontaine-lès-Dijon

Government
  - Mayor (2020–2026): Patrice Demaison
- Area^{1}: 6.79 km^{2} (2.62 sq mi)
- Elevation: 258 m (846 ft)
- Highest elevation: 307 m (1,007 ft)
- Lowest elevation: 244 m (801 ft)
- Population (2023): 219
  - Density: 32.3/km^{2} (83.5/sq mi)
- Time zone: UTC+01:00 (CET)
  - Summer (DST): UTC+02:00 (CEST)
- INSEE/Postal code: 21266 /21490
- ^{1} French Land Register data, which excludes lakes, ponds, glaciers > 1 km^{2} (0.386 sq mi or 247 acres) and river estuaries.

Flacey (French pronunciation: [flasɛ]) is a commune in the Côte-d'Or department in eastern France.

== Population ==
Historical population
Year	Pop.	±% p.a.
1968	107	—
1975	116	+1.16%
1982	131	+1.75%
1990	123	−0.78%
1999	144	+1.77%
2007	170	+2.10%
2012	150	−2.47%
2017	185	+4.28%
2023	219	+2.85%
Source: INSEE

== See also ==
- Communes of the Côte-d'Or department
