= Savigny-le-Sec =

- Commune
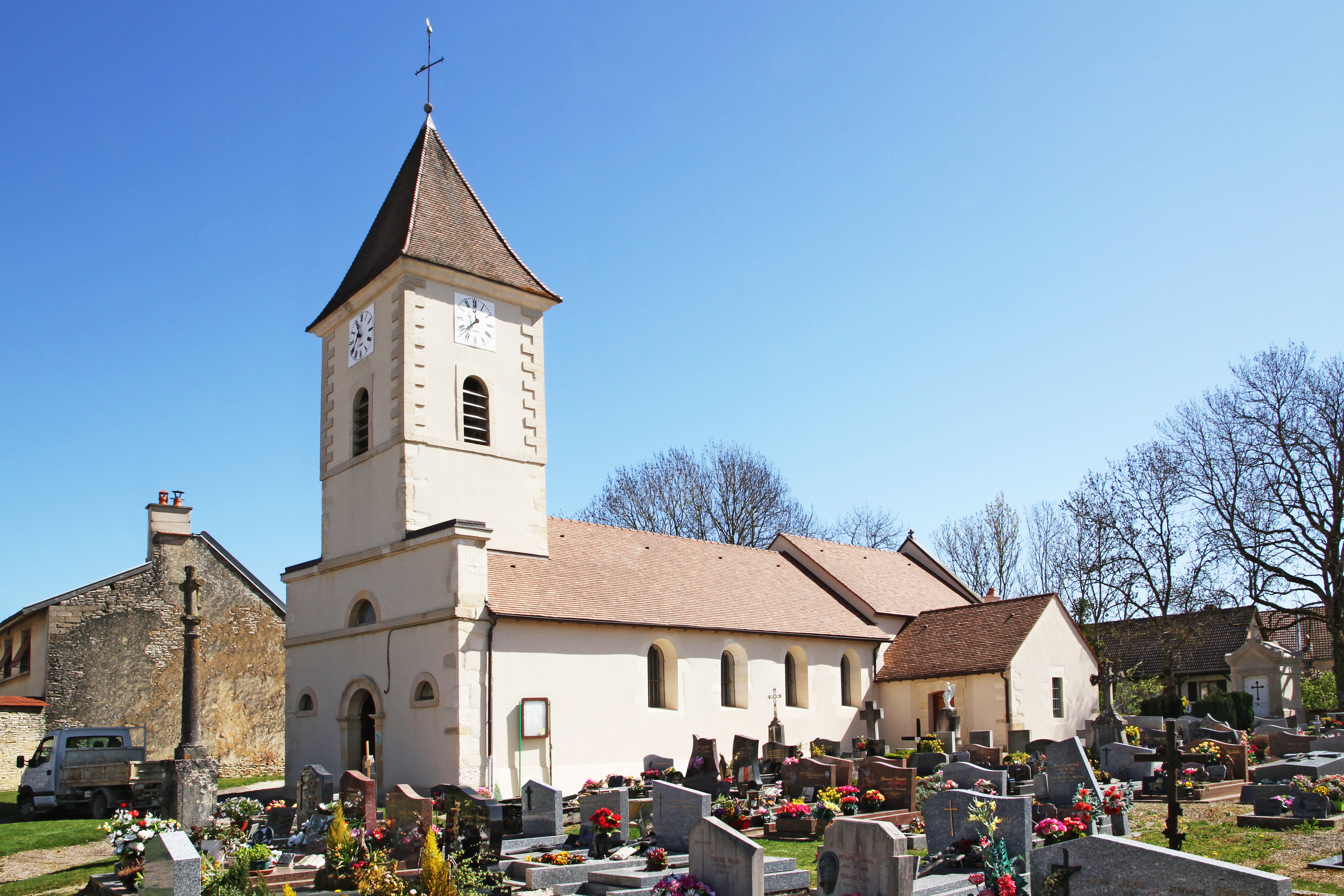
- The church in Savigny-le-Sec

- Coat of arms
- Location of Savigny-le-Sec
- Location within France Location within Bourgogne-Franche-Comté
- Coordinates: 47°25′51″N 5°03′14″E
- Country: France
- Region: Bourgogne-Franche-Comté
- Department: Côte-d'Or
- Arrondissement: Dijon
- Canton: Fontaine-lès-Dijon

Government
  - Mayor (2020–2026): Jean-Michel Staiger
- Area^{1}: 9.34 km^{2} (3.61 sq mi)
- Elevation: 298 m (978 ft)
- Highest elevation: 483 m (1,585 ft)
- Lowest elevation: 277 m (909 ft)
- Population (2023): 901
  - Density: 96.5/km^{2} (250/sq mi)
- Time zone: UTC+01:00 (CET)
  - Summer (DST): UTC+02:00 (CEST)
- INSEE/Postal code: 21591 /21380
- ^{1} French Land Register data, which excludes lakes, ponds, glaciers > 1 km^{2} (0.386 sq mi or 247 acres) and river estuaries.

Savigny-le-Sec (French pronunciation: [saviɲi lə sɛk]) is a commune in the Côte-d'Or department in eastern France.

== Population ==
Historical population
Year	Pop.	±% p.a.
1968	219	—
1975	593	+15.29%
1982	737	+3.15%
1990	741	+0.07%
1999	780	+0.57%
2007	818	+0.60%
2012	819	+0.02%
2017	844	+0.60%
2023	901	+1.10%
Source: INSEE

== See also ==
- Communes of the Côte-d'Or department
