= Arnay-le-Duc =

- Commune
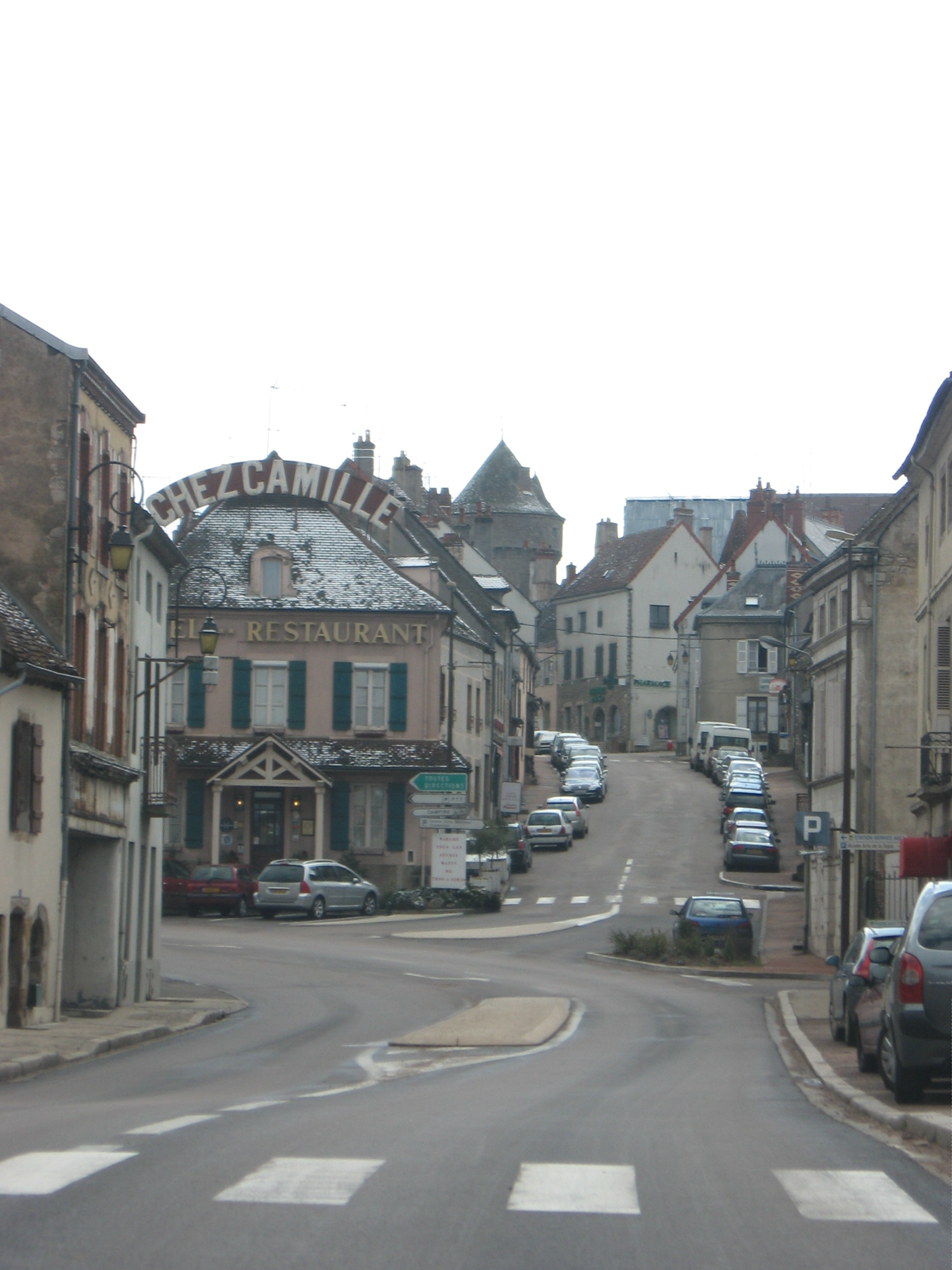

- Coat of arms
- Location of Arnay-le-Duc
- Location within France Location within Bourgogne-Franche-Comté
- Coordinates: 47°07′19″N 4°29′24″E
- Country: France
- Region: Bourgogne-Franche-Comté
- Department: Côte-d'Or
- Arrondissement: Beaune
- Canton: Arnay-le-Duc
- Intercommunality: CC Pays Arnay Liernais

Government
  - Mayor (2020–2026): Benjamin Leroux
- Area^{1}: 11.95 km^{2} (4.61 sq mi)
- Elevation: 375 m (1,230 ft)
- Highest elevation: 412 m (1,352 ft)
- Lowest elevation: 328 m (1,076 ft)
- Population (2023): 1,342
  - Density: 112.3/km^{2} (290.9/sq mi)
- Demonym: Arnétois
- Time zone: UTC+01:00 (CET)
  - Summer (DST): UTC+02:00 (CEST)
- INSEE/Postal code: 21023 /21230
- ^{1} French Land Register data, which excludes lakes, ponds, glaciers > 1 km^{2} (0.386 sq mi or 247 acres) and river estuaries.

Arnay-le-Duc (French pronunciation: [aʁnɛ l(ə) dyk]; lit. 'Arnay-the-Duke') is a commune in the Côte-d'Or department in the Bourgogne-Franche-Comté region of eastern France.

== Geography ==
Arnay-le-Duc is located some 25 km north-west of Beaune and some 35 km south-east of Saulieu. Access to the commune is by the D906 road from Lacanche in the south-east passing through the town and continuing north-west. The D981 comes from the end of the A38 autoroute in the north-east and passes through the town continuing to the south-west where it becomes National Highway N81. These two roads were originally Gallo-Roman roads linking Autun and Alesia, then in the Middle Ages linking the Rhone corridor to fairs in Champagne. The D17 comes from Marcheseuil in the west passing through the town and continuing to Bligny-sur-Ouche in the east. The D117A goes north from the town to Allerey. The D36 branches off the D981 south of the town and goes to Maligny. Apart from the town there is the hamlet of Chassenay in the south-west of the commune. Apart from the town and two large forests in the north-east, the commune is all farmland.

The Arroux river passes through the town from west to east forming part of the western border of the commune and gathering several tributaries rising in the commune. The Arroux eventually joins the Loire at Digoin. The Ruisseau de Barive forms the eastern border of the commune flowing north to join the Arroux.

=== Climate ===
Arnay-le-Duc has an oceanic climate (Köppen climate classification Cfb). The average annual temperature in Arnay-le-Duc is 10.2 °C (50.4 °F). The average annual rainfall is 807.0 mm (31.77 in) with November as the wettest month. The temperatures are highest on average in July, at around 18.5 °C (65.3 °F), and lowest in January, at around 2.0 °C (35.6 °F). The highest temperature ever recorded in Arnay-le-Duc was 39.1 °C (102.4 °F) on 24 July 2019; the coldest temperature ever recorded was −18.1 °C (−0.6 °F) on 20 December 2009.

Climate data for Arnay-le-Duc (1981–2010 averages, extremes 1996−present)
| Month | Jan | Feb | Mar | Apr | May | Jun | Jul | Aug | Sep | Oct | Nov | Dec | Year |
|---|---|---|---|---|---|---|---|---|---|---|---|---|---|
| Record high °C (°F) | 15.9 (60.6) | 23.4 (74.1) | 24.5 (76.1) | 28.0 (82.4) | 31.3 (88.3) | 37.5 (99.5) | 39.1 (102.4) | 38.7 (101.7) | 33.2 (91.8) | 27.3 (81.1) | 21.8 (71.2) | 15.8 (60.4) | 39.1 (102.4) |
| Mean daily maximum °C (°F) | 5.2 (41.4) | 7.4 (45.3) | 11.2 (52.2) | 14.9 (58.8) | 19.1 (66.4) | 23.1 (73.6) | 24.7 (76.5) | 24.6 (76.3) | 20.2 (68.4) | 15.7 (60.3) | 9.1 (48.4) | 5.3 (41.5) | 15.1 (59.2) |
| Daily mean °C (°F) | 2.0 (35.6) | 3.4 (38.1) | 6.3 (43.3) | 9.4 (48.9) | 13.5 (56.3) | 16.9 (62.4) | 18.5 (65.3) | 18.4 (65.1) | 14.4 (57.9) | 10.9 (51.6) | 5.6 (42.1) | 2.4 (36.3) | 10.2 (50.4) |
| Mean daily minimum °C (°F) | −1.2 (29.8) | −0.5 (31.1) | 1.5 (34.7) | 3.9 (39.0) | 8.0 (46.4) | 10.8 (51.4) | 12.3 (54.1) | 12.2 (54.0) | 8.6 (47.5) | 6.0 (42.8) | 2.2 (36.0) | −0.6 (30.9) | 5.3 (41.5) |
| Record low °C (°F) | −13.5 (7.7) | −16.7 (1.9) | −15.4 (4.3) | −5.9 (21.4) | −1.8 (28.8) | −0.4 (31.3) | 4.9 (40.8) | 2.4 (36.3) | −0.4 (31.3) | −6.8 (19.8) | −12.4 (9.7) | −18.1 (−0.6) | −18.1 (−0.6) |
| Average precipitation mm (inches) | 62.9 (2.48) | 52.3 (2.06) | 57.7 (2.27) | 68.1 (2.68) | 74.2 (2.92) | 61.9 (2.44) | 71.4 (2.81) | 69.4 (2.73) | 57.1 (2.25) | 77.3 (3.04) | 87.1 (3.43) | 67.6 (2.66) | 807.0 (31.77) |
| Average precipitation days (≥ 1.0 mm) | 10.9 | 9.6 | 10.4 | 11.4 | 11.3 | 8.8 | 10.2 | 9.6 | 7.6 | 10.7 | 13.3 | 11.7 | 125.7 |
Source: Météo France

== History ==
- Arnay-le-Duc was the location of the worship of the Celtic god Abilus, who was associated with the goddess Damona.
- Battle of Arnay-le-Duc' on 27 June 1570: During the French Wars of Religion the Catholic armies of Artus de Cossé-Brissac (Marshal of Cossé) were beaten by the Protestant armies of Gaspard II de Coligny. This was the first military engagement of Henry of Navarre, the future Henri IV. Jean de La Taille was wounded.
- The arrest of the fleeing aunts of King Louis XVI occurred here in February to March 1791.
- During the revolutionary period of the National Convention (1792-1795), the town took the name of Arnay-sur-Arroux. It was the capital of the district of Arnay-sur-Arroux from 1790 to 1795.
- On 3 December 1870, during the Franco-Prussian War, a military engagement took place here.

=== Heraldry ===
| Arms of Arnay-le-Duc | Blazon: Azure, 3 towers turreted and roofed Argent, doors of Or, masined, windowed, and flagged in Sable, the middle tower higher. |

== Administration ==
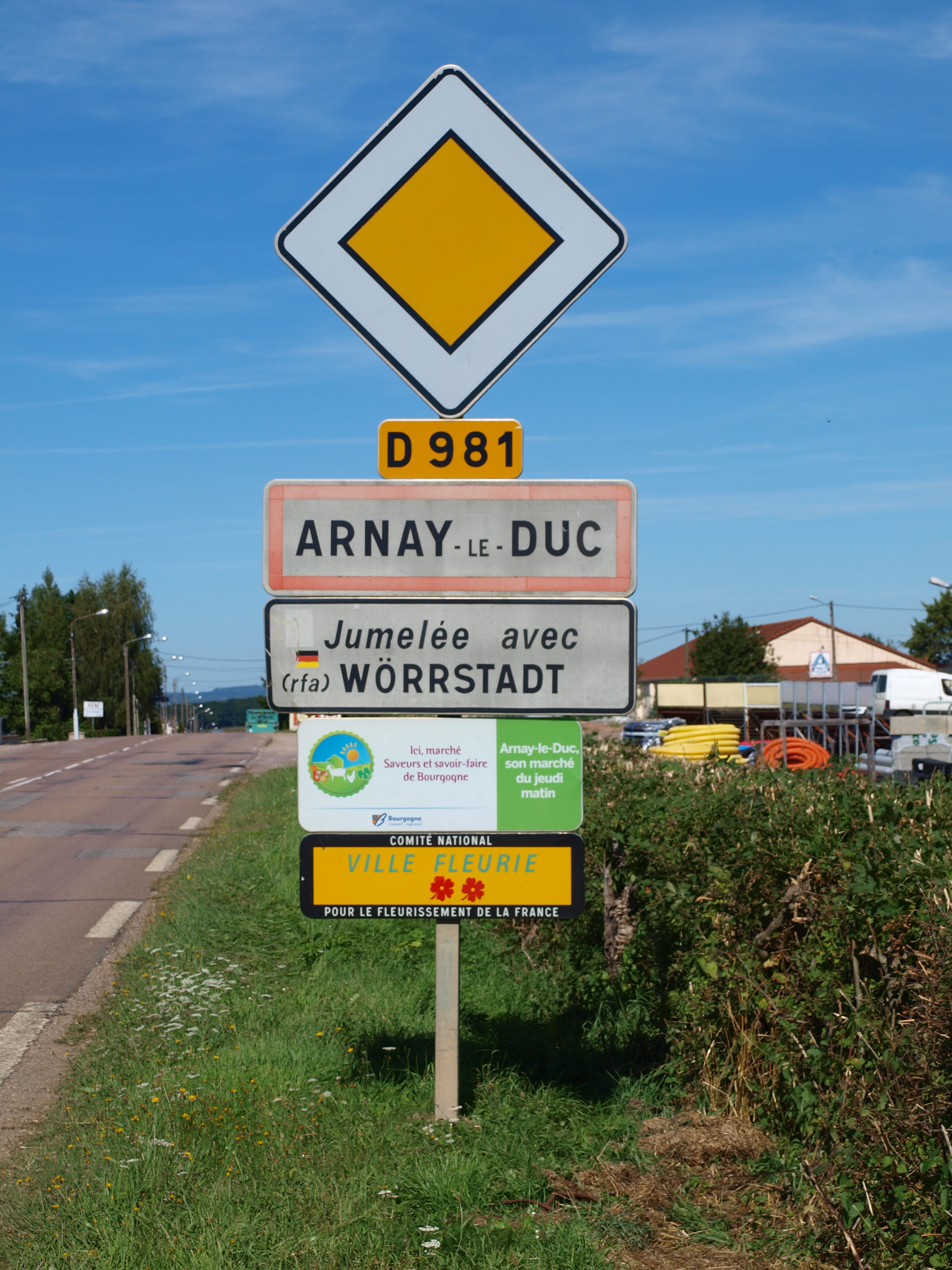
Entry to the town

List of Successive Mayors

| From | To | Name | Party | Position |
|---|---|---|---|---|
| 1912 | 1918 | Nicolas Justin Hutin | | |
| 1918 | 1919 | Claude Bullier | | |
| 1919 | 1925 | Georges Horloger | | |
| 1925 | 1926 | Claude Bullier | | |
| 1926 | 1965 | Claude Guyot | SFIO | MP for Côte-d'Or |
| 1965 | 1965 | Louis Lucien Marcel Desauge | DVG | |
| 1966 | 1971 | Henri Cordier | DVG | |
| 1971 | 1983 | Pierre Meunier | PC | MP for Côte-d'Or |
| 1983 | 1989 | Jacques Linguanotto | DVD | |
| 1989 | 1995 | Jeanine Orliac | DVG | |
| 1995 | 2008 | Pierre Deloince | PS | |
| 2008 | 2020 | Claude Chave | RN | |
| 2020 | 2026 | Benjamin Leroux | | |

=== Twinning ===
Arnay-le-Duc has twinning associations with:

- Wörrstadt (Germany).

== Demography ==
The inhabitants of the commune are known as Arnétois or Arnétoises in French.

Historical population

| Year | Pop. | ±% p.a. |
|---|---|---|
| 1793 | 2,550 | — |
| 1800 | 2,413 | −0.79% |
| 1806 | 2,620 | +1.38% |
| 1821 | 2,368 | −0.67% |
| 1831 | 2,563 | +0.79% |
| 1836 | 2,617 | +0.42% |
| 1841 | 2,511 | −0.82% |
| 1846 | 2,511 | +0.00% |
| 1851 | 2,473 | −0.30% |
| 1856 | 2,476 | +0.02% |
| 1861 | 2,531 | +0.44% |
| 1866 | 2,559 | +0.22% |
| 1872 | 2,592 | +0.21% |
| 1876 | 2,581 | −0.11% |
| 1881 | 2,626 | +0.35% |
| 1886 | 2,580 | −0.35% |
| 1891 | 2,876 | +2.20% |
| 1896 | 2,644 | −1.67% |
| 1901 | 2,666 | +0.17% |

| Year | Pop. | ±% p.a. |
|---|---|---|
| 1906 | 2,782 | +0.86% |
| 1911 | 2,581 | −1.49% |
| 1921 | 2,092 | −2.08% |
| 1926 | 2,030 | −0.60% |
| 1931 | 2,021 | −0.09% |
| 1936 | 1,972 | −0.49% |
| 1946 | 1,946 | −0.13% |
| 1954 | 1,900 | −0.30% |
| 1962 | 2,018 | +0.76% |
| 1968 | 2,232 | +1.69% |
| 1975 | 2,456 | +1.38% |
| 1982 | 2,334 | −0.73% |
| 1990 | 2,040 | −1.67% |
| 1999 | 1,829 | −1.21% |
| 2007 | 1,690 | −0.98% |
| 2012 | 1,547 | −1.75% |
| 2017 | 1,425 | −1.63% |
| 2023 | 1,342 | −1.00% |

Source: EHESS and INSEE

== Culture and heritage ==
=== Civil heritage ===
The commune has a number of buildings and structures that are registered as historical monuments:

- A House at Place Carnot (16th century)
- The Maugars House at Rue du Collège (16th century)
- A House at 24 Rue Saint-Honoré (16th century)
- The Hospice of Saint-Pierre at Rue Saint-Jacques (1686). The Hospice contains several items that are registered as historical objects:
  - A Soup Turreen (18th century)
  - Many Plates and Dishes (16th-18th century)
  - A Mortar bowl (1595)
  - 7 Pharmacy pots (18th century)
  - A Sideboard (18th century)
  - A Painting: Virgin and child (15th century)
- The Hospital of Saint-Pierre at Rue Saint-Jacques (1692) The Hospital contains a very large number of items that are registered as historical objects.
- The Tower of Motte-Forte (14th century)
- The Château of the Princes de Condé (1550)

The Chateau of the Princes of Condé Picture Gallery

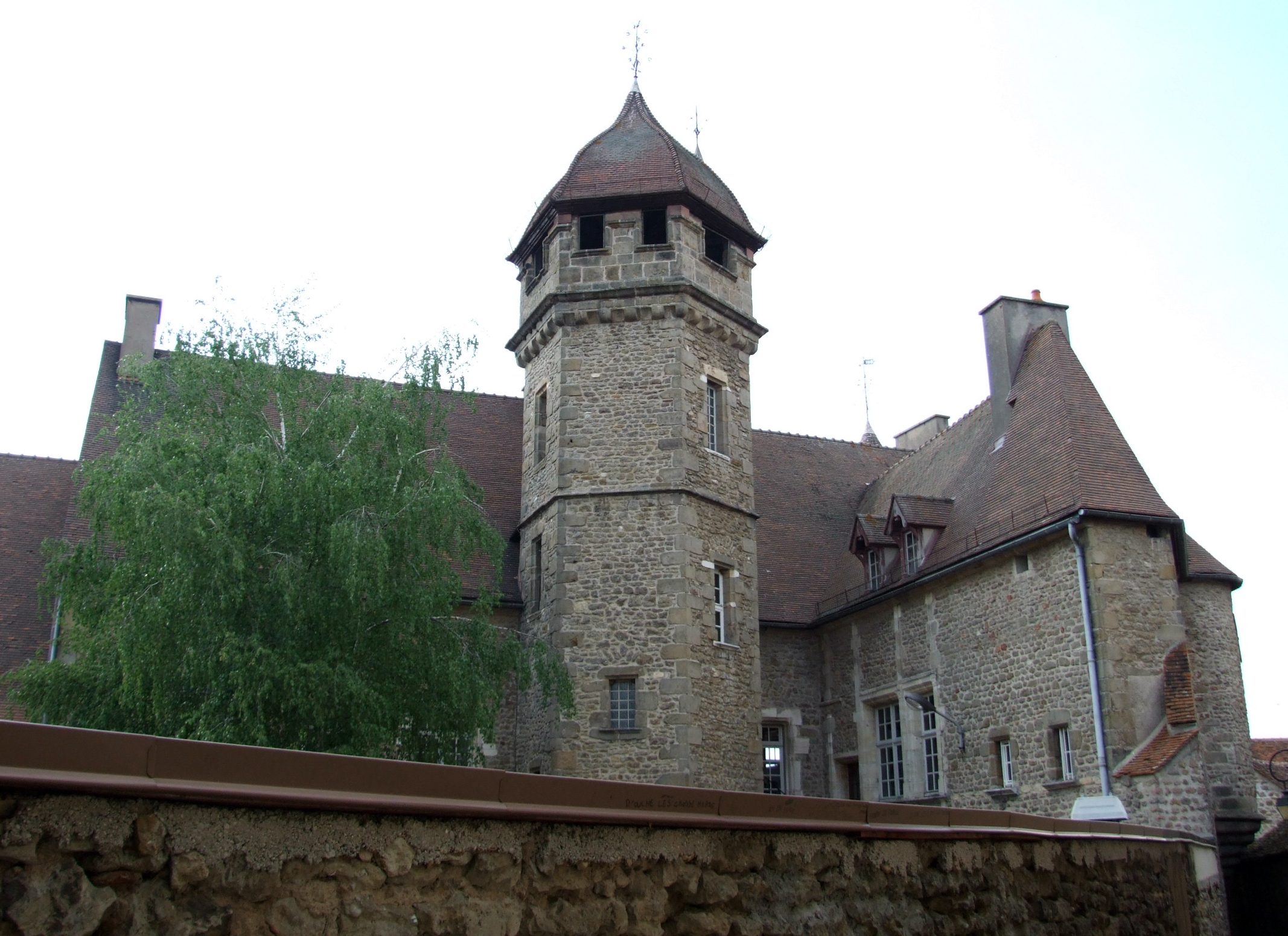
Château of Arnay-le-Duc called "Former château of the Princes of Condé"

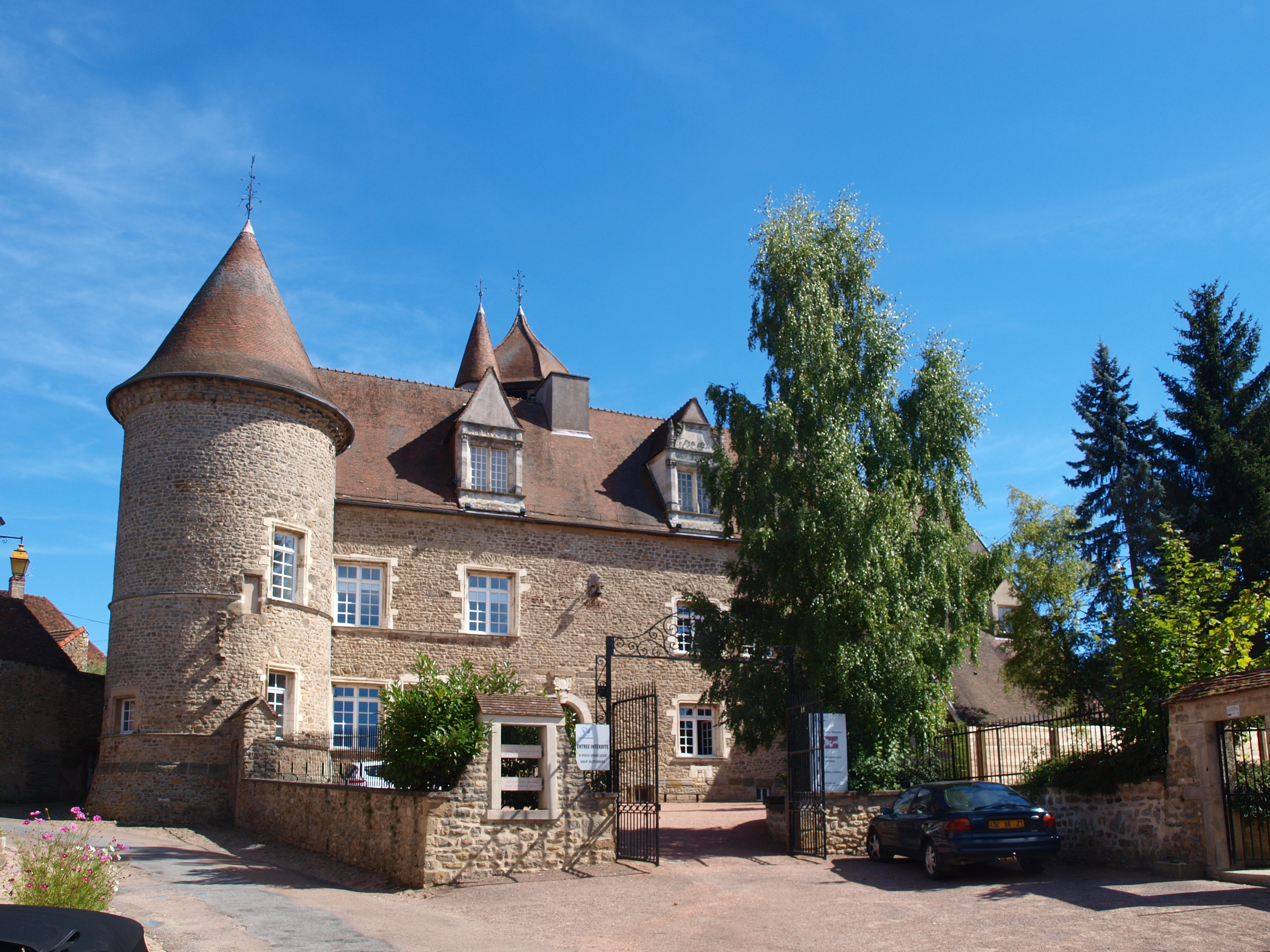
Front View

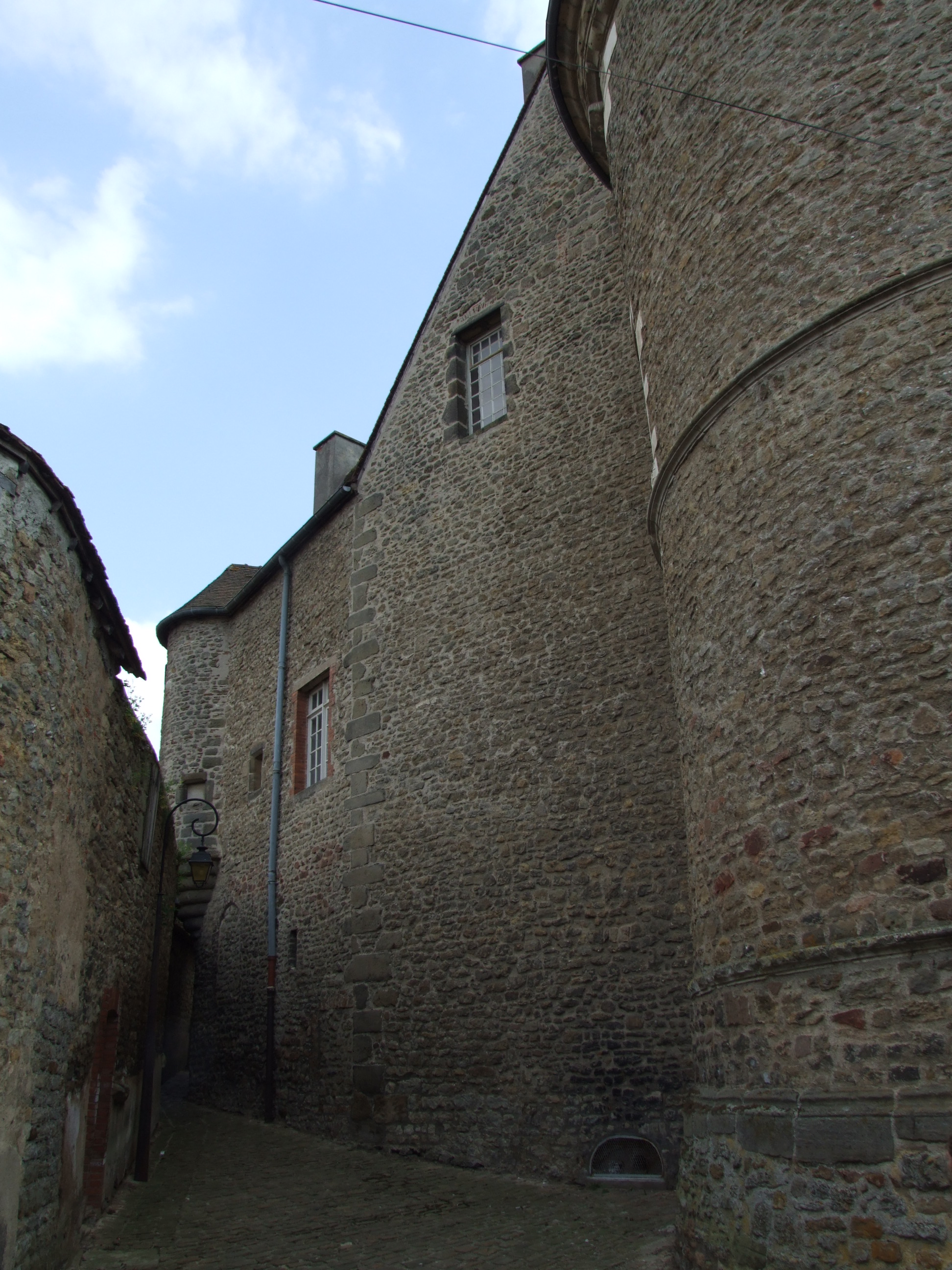
The walls

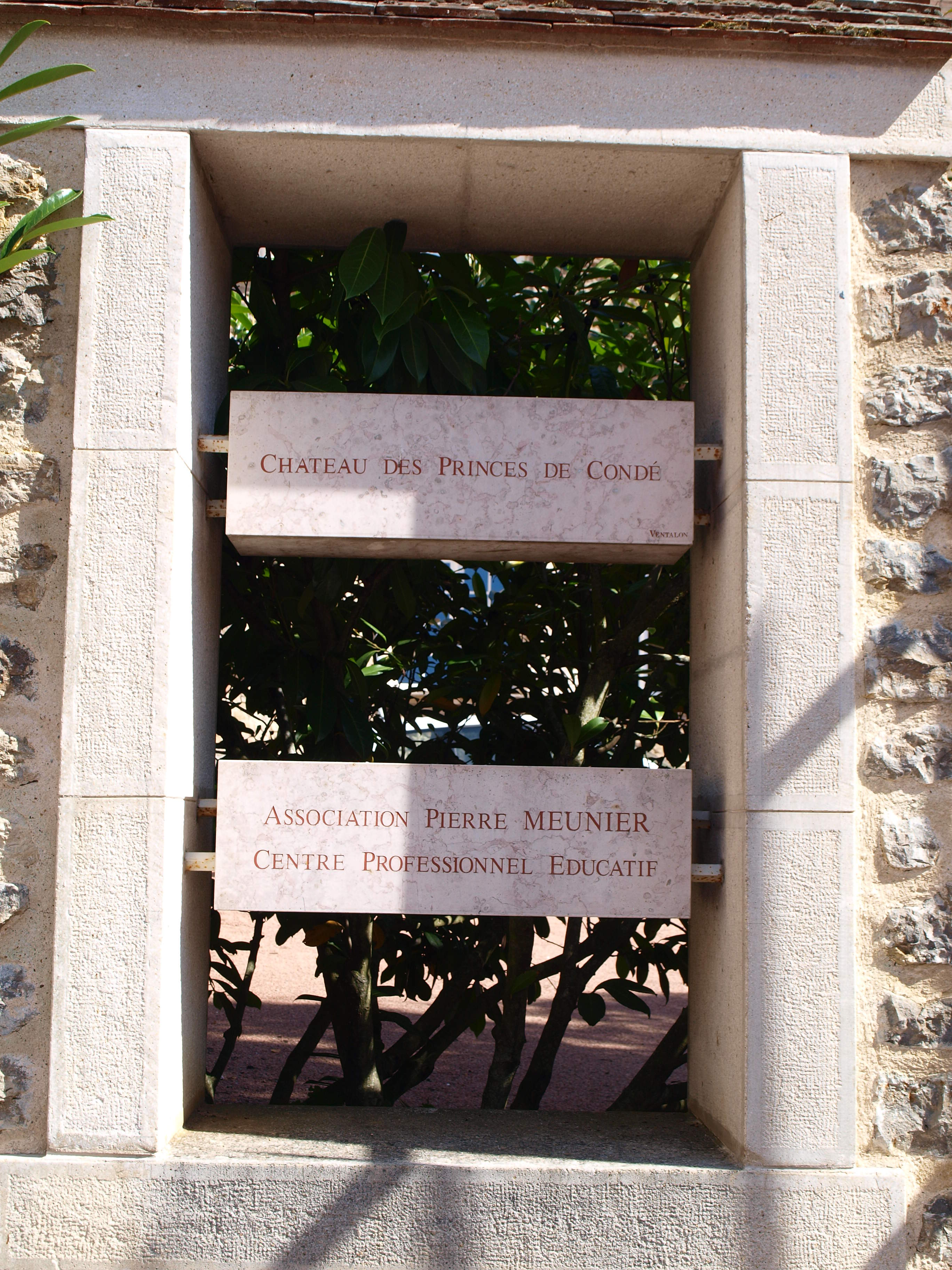
Signs

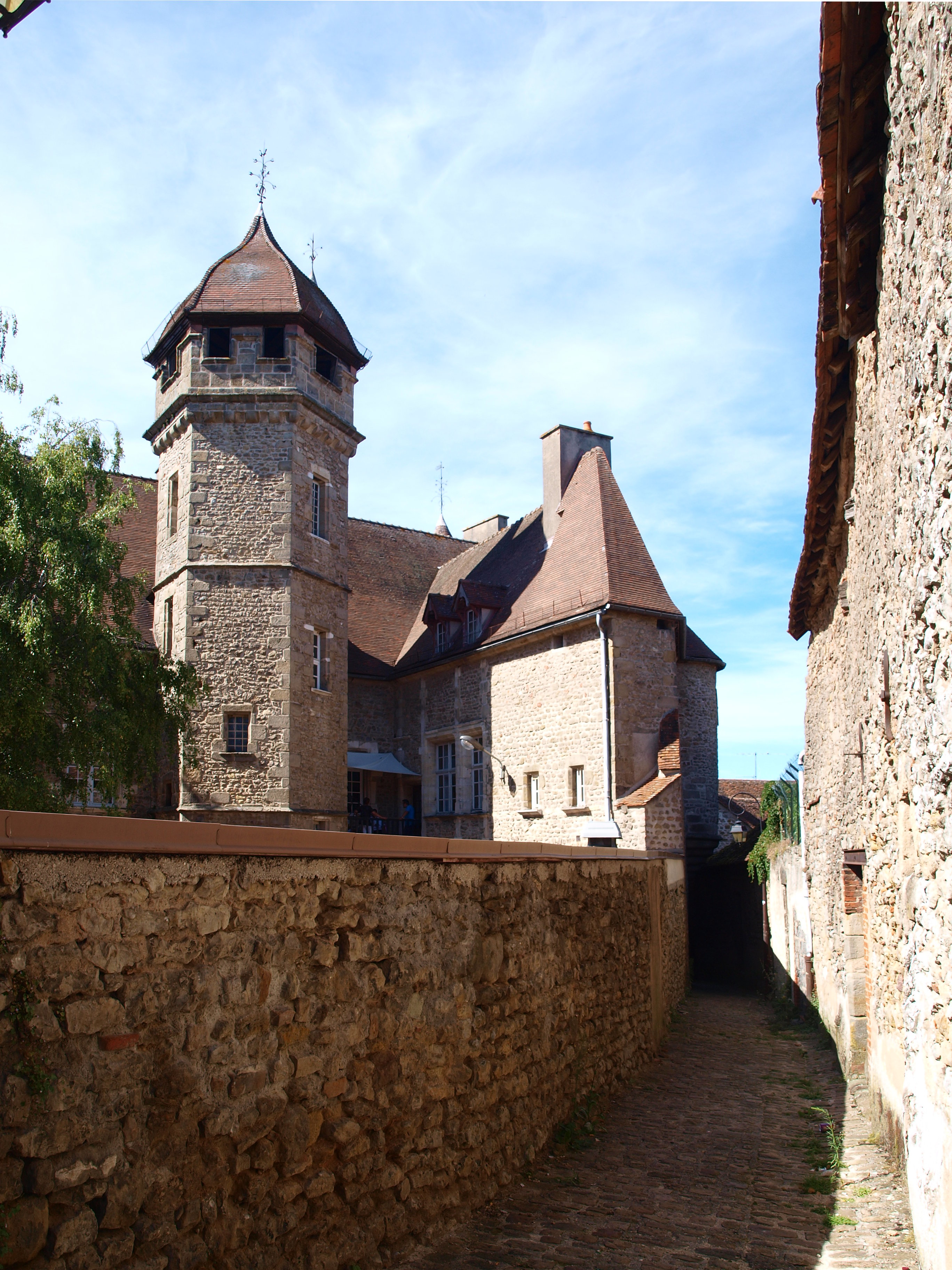

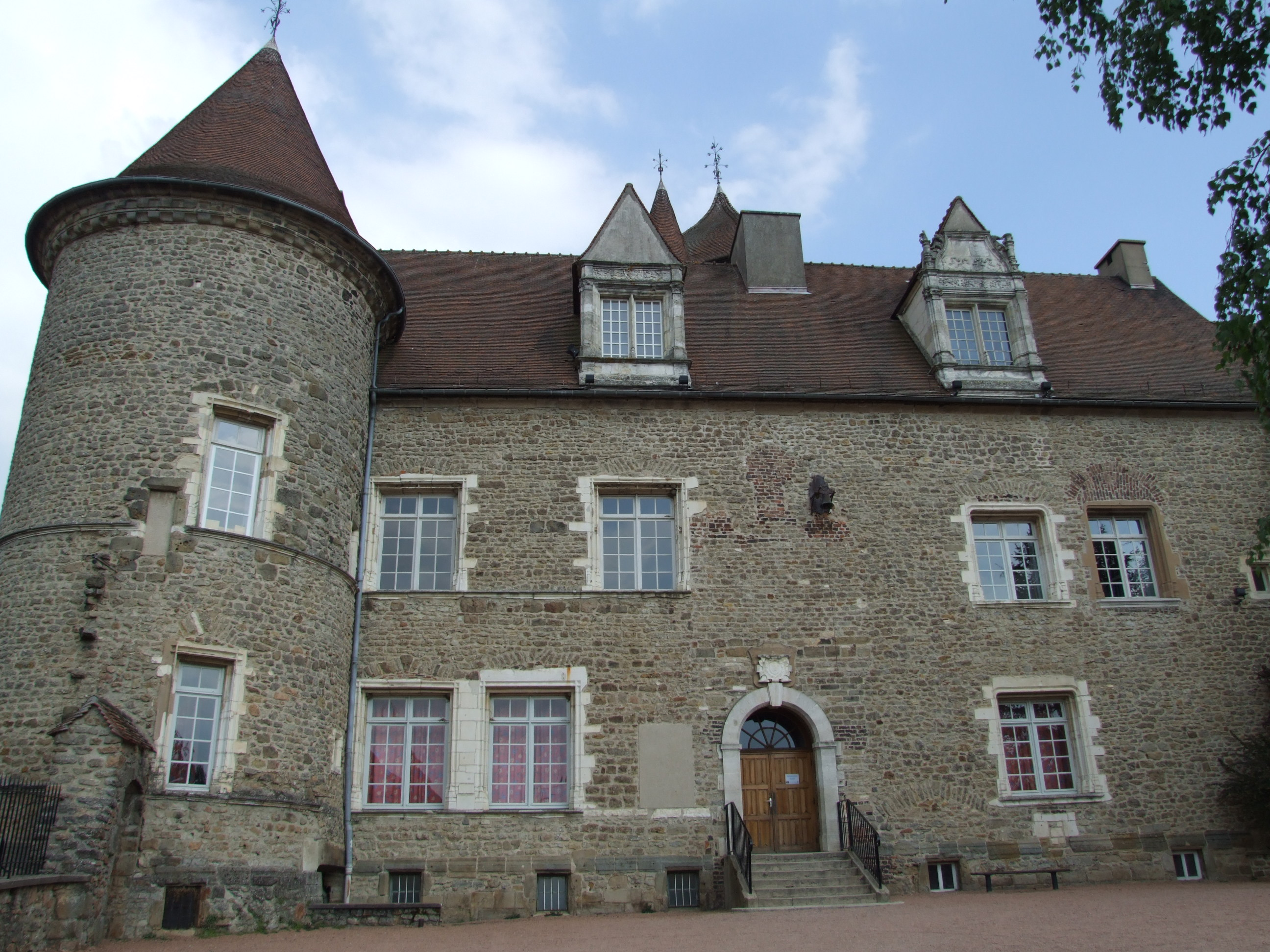

Other sights

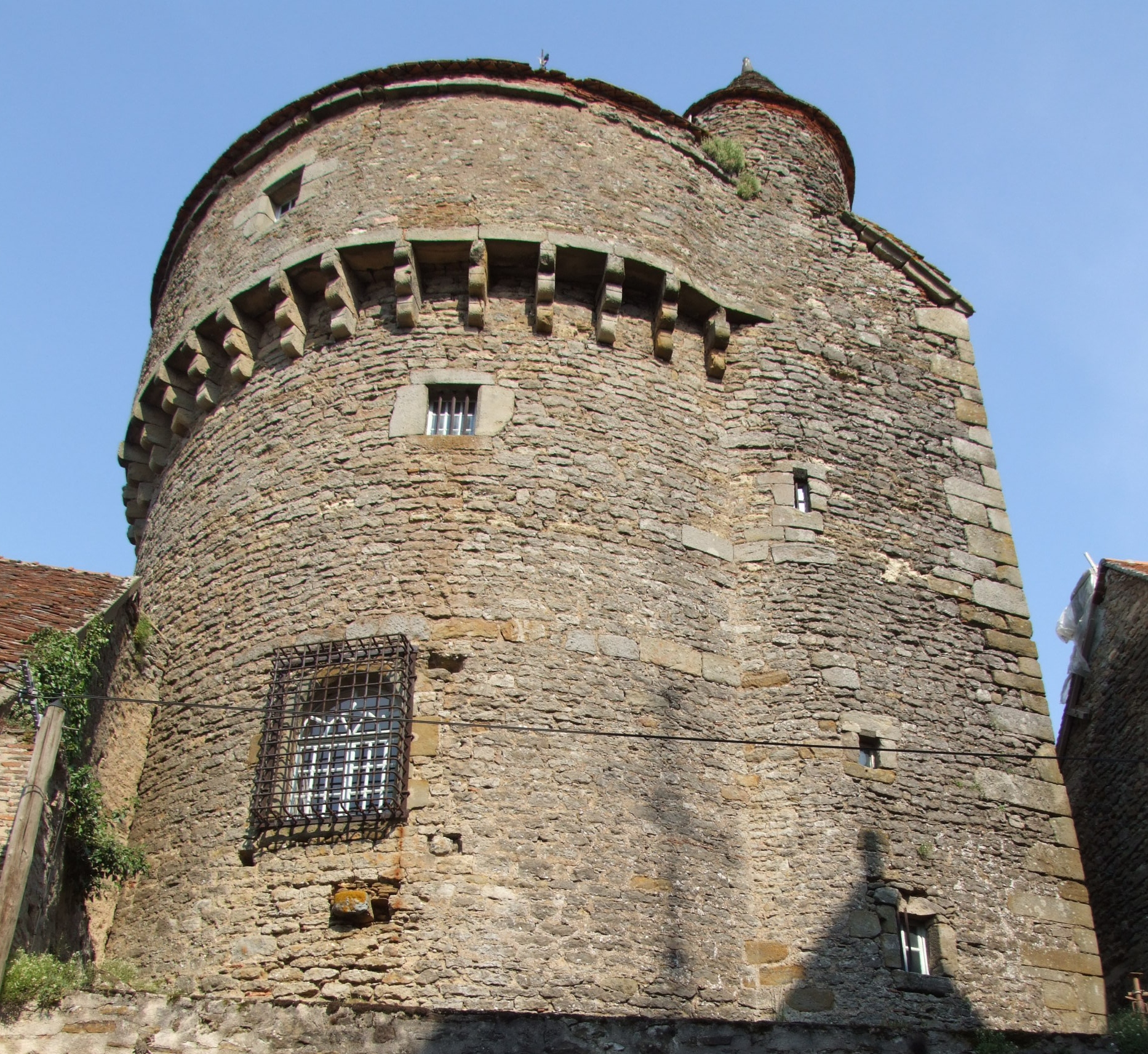
Tour de la motte forte

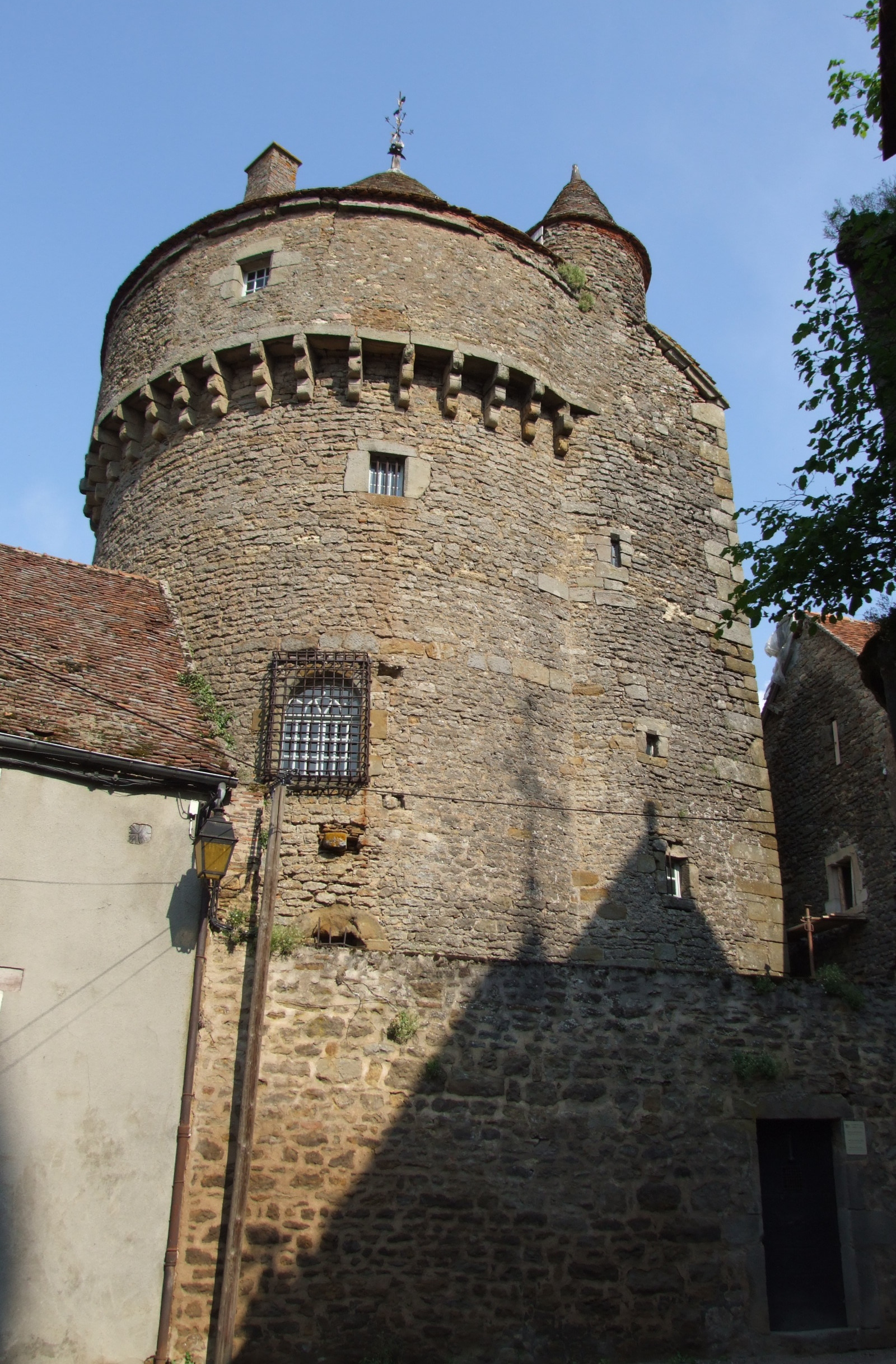
Tour de la motte forte

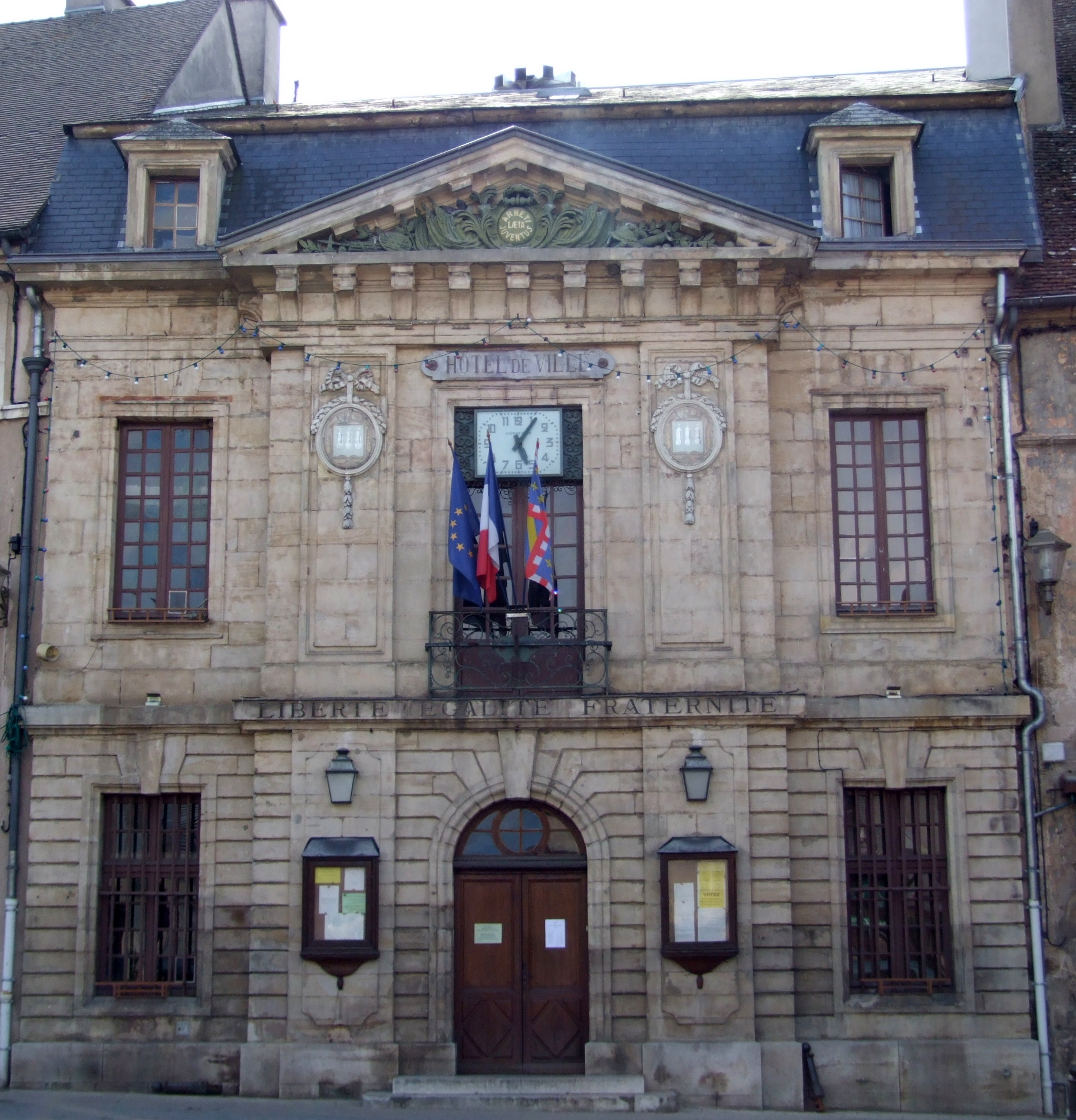
The Town Hall (former Ursuline convent)

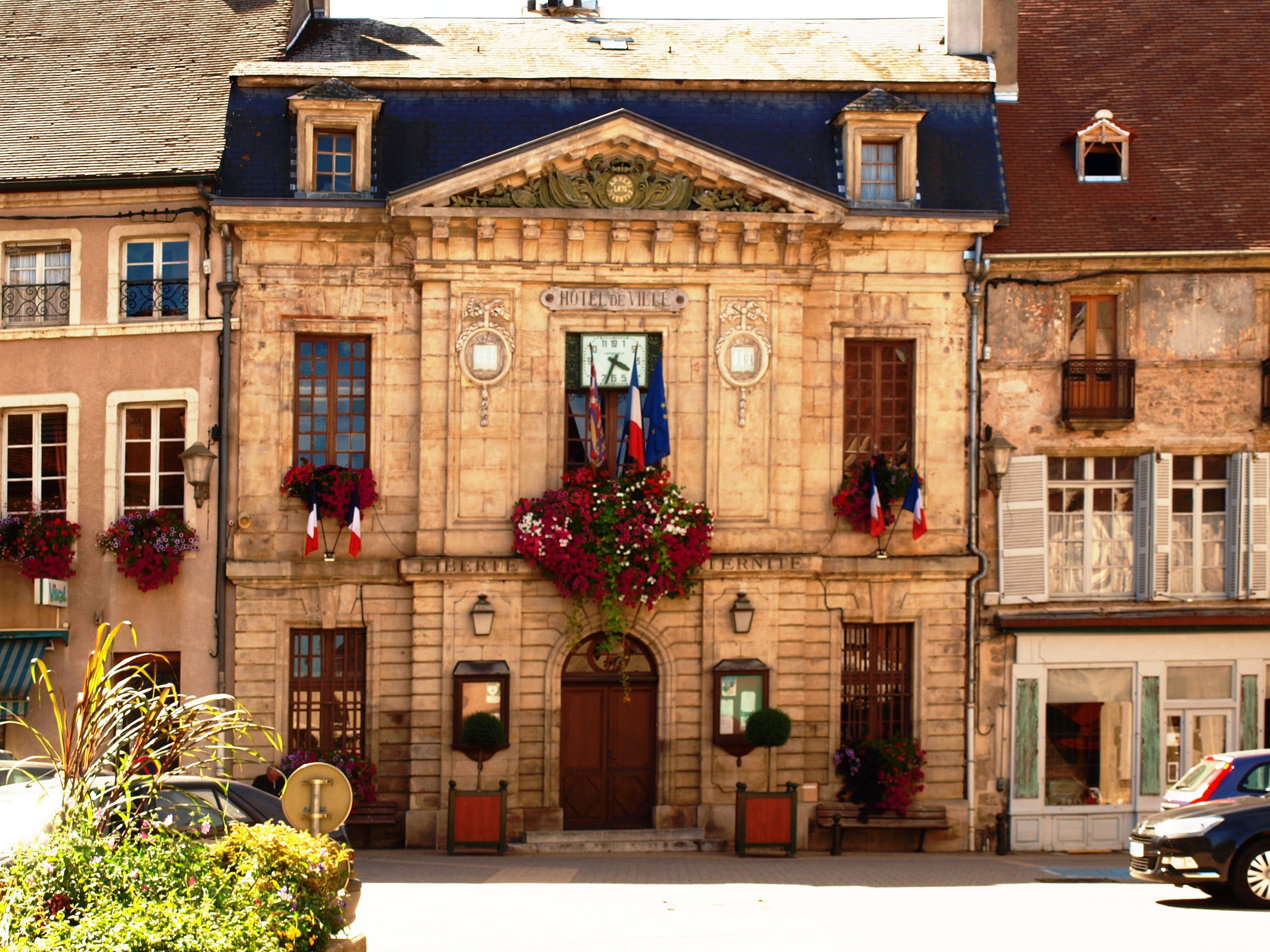
The Town Hall

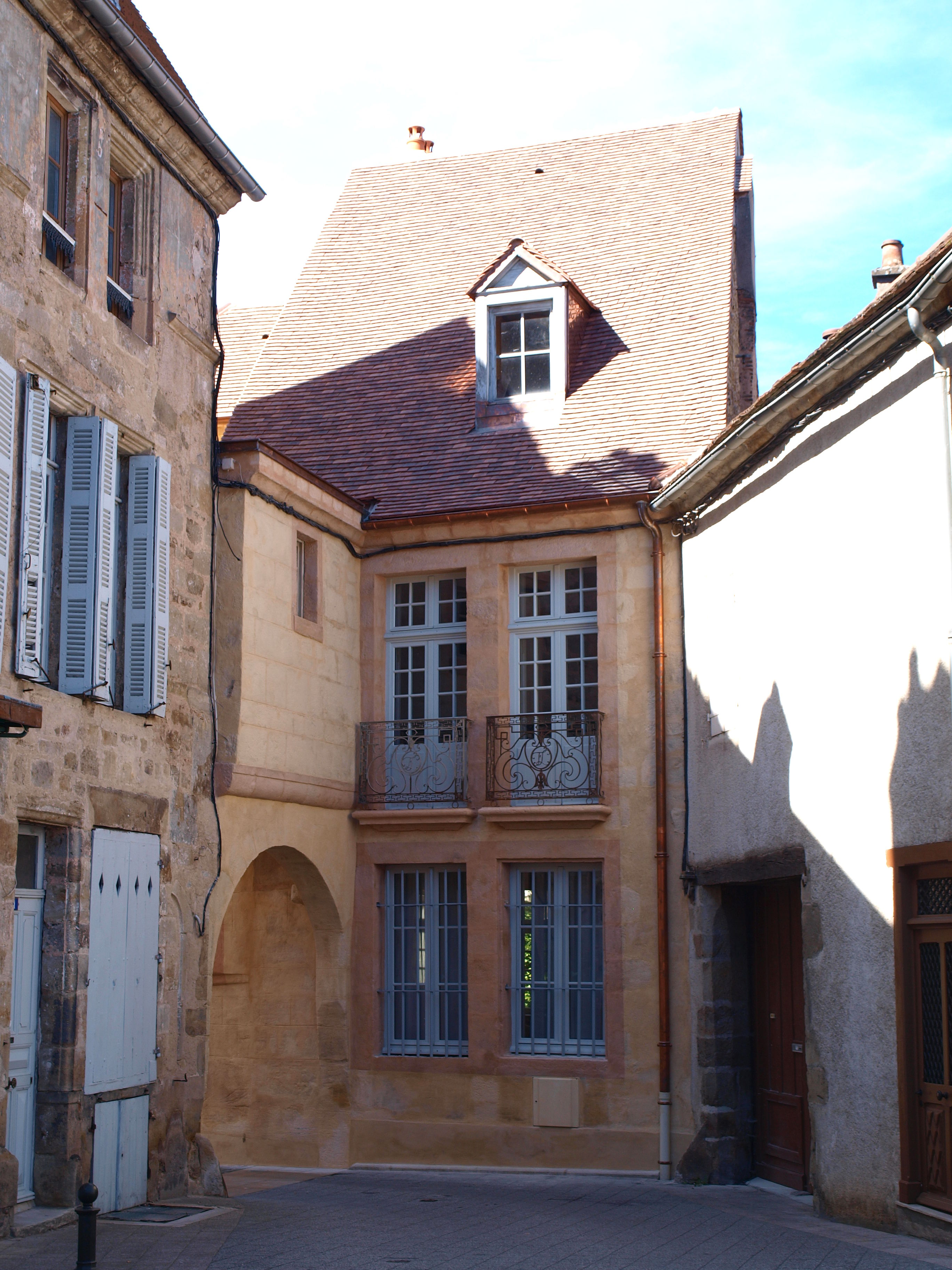
A porch in the Town Hall Square

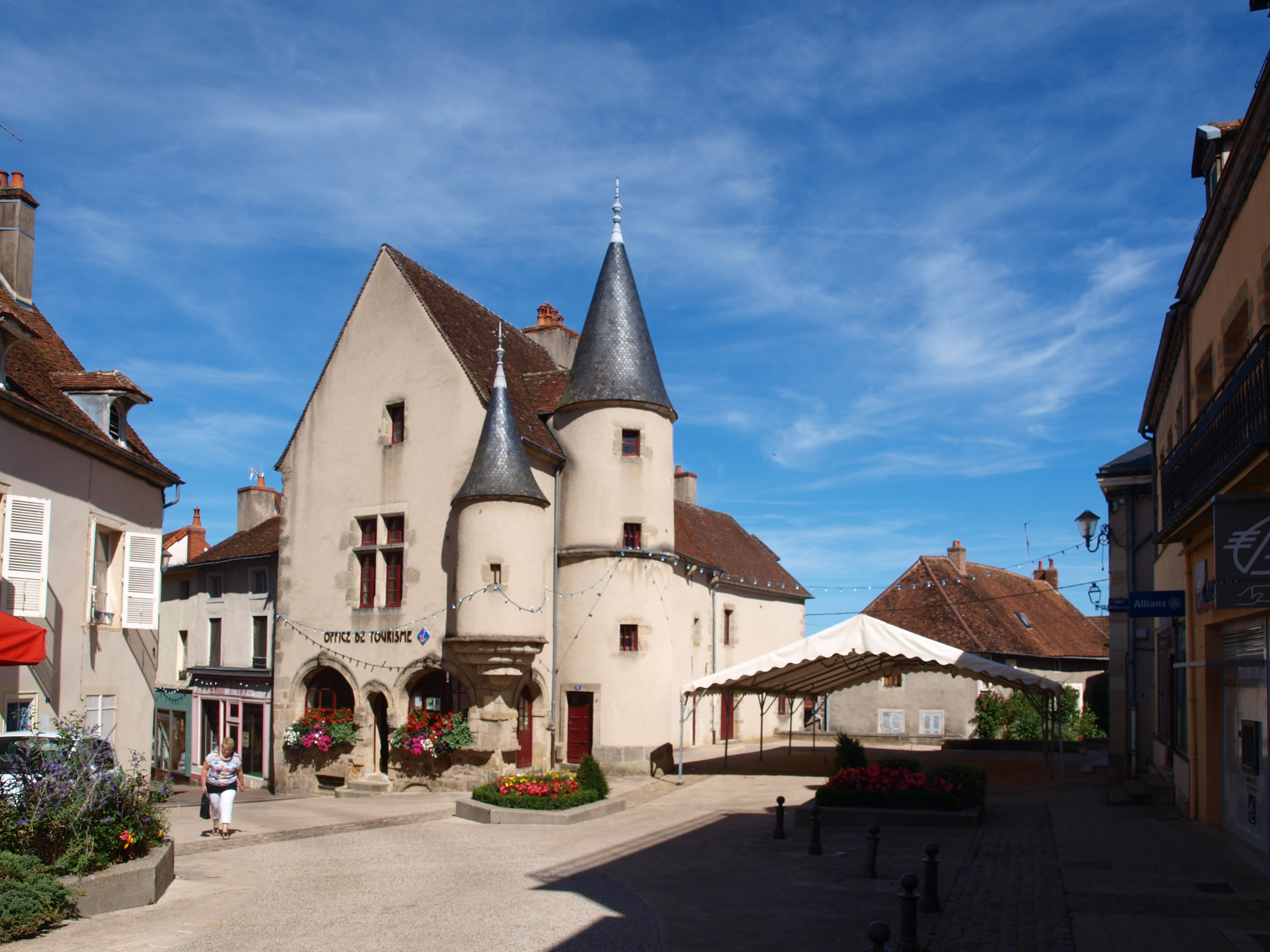
The Maison Bougogne now the Tourist Office

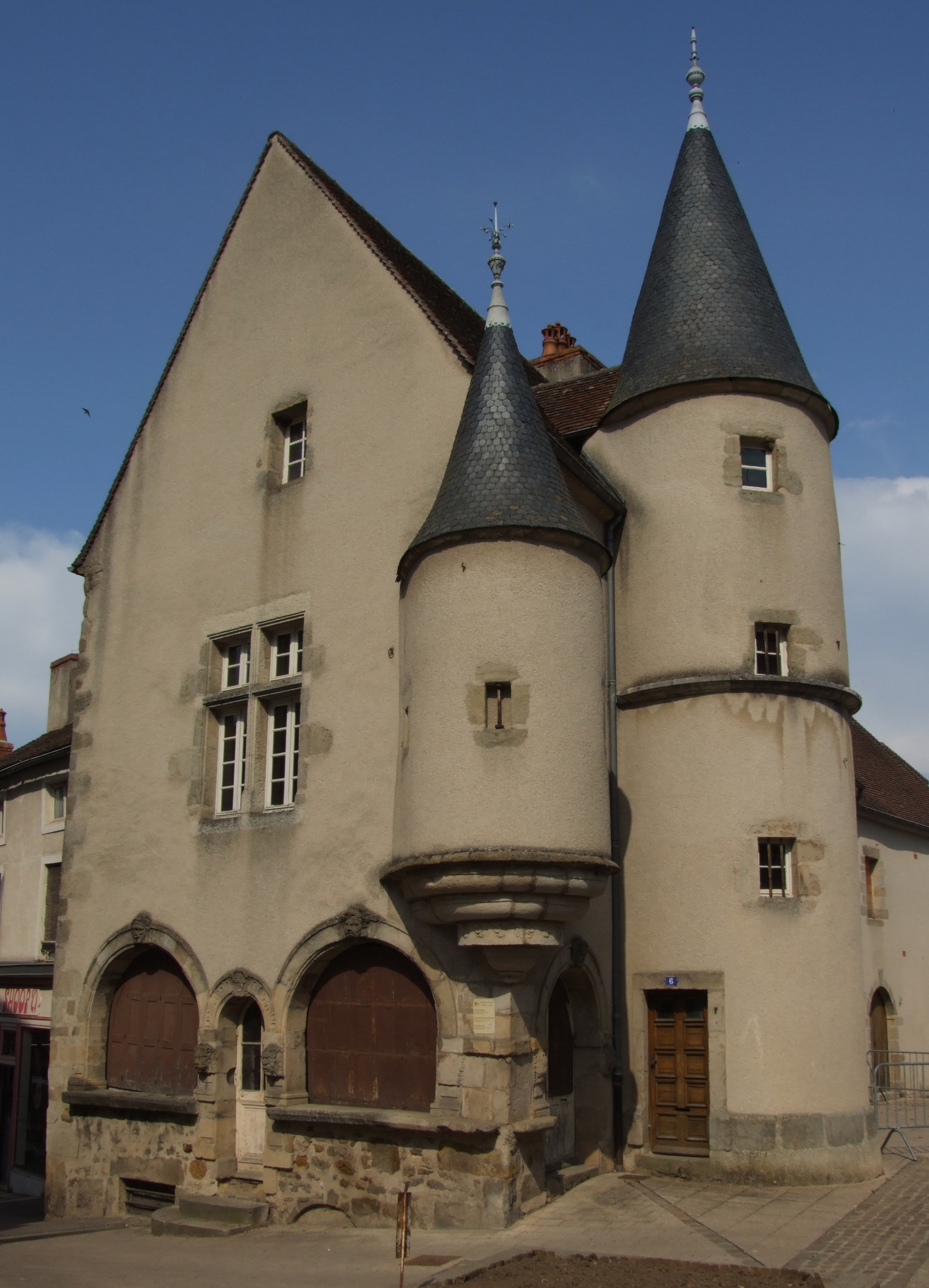
The Maison Bougogne

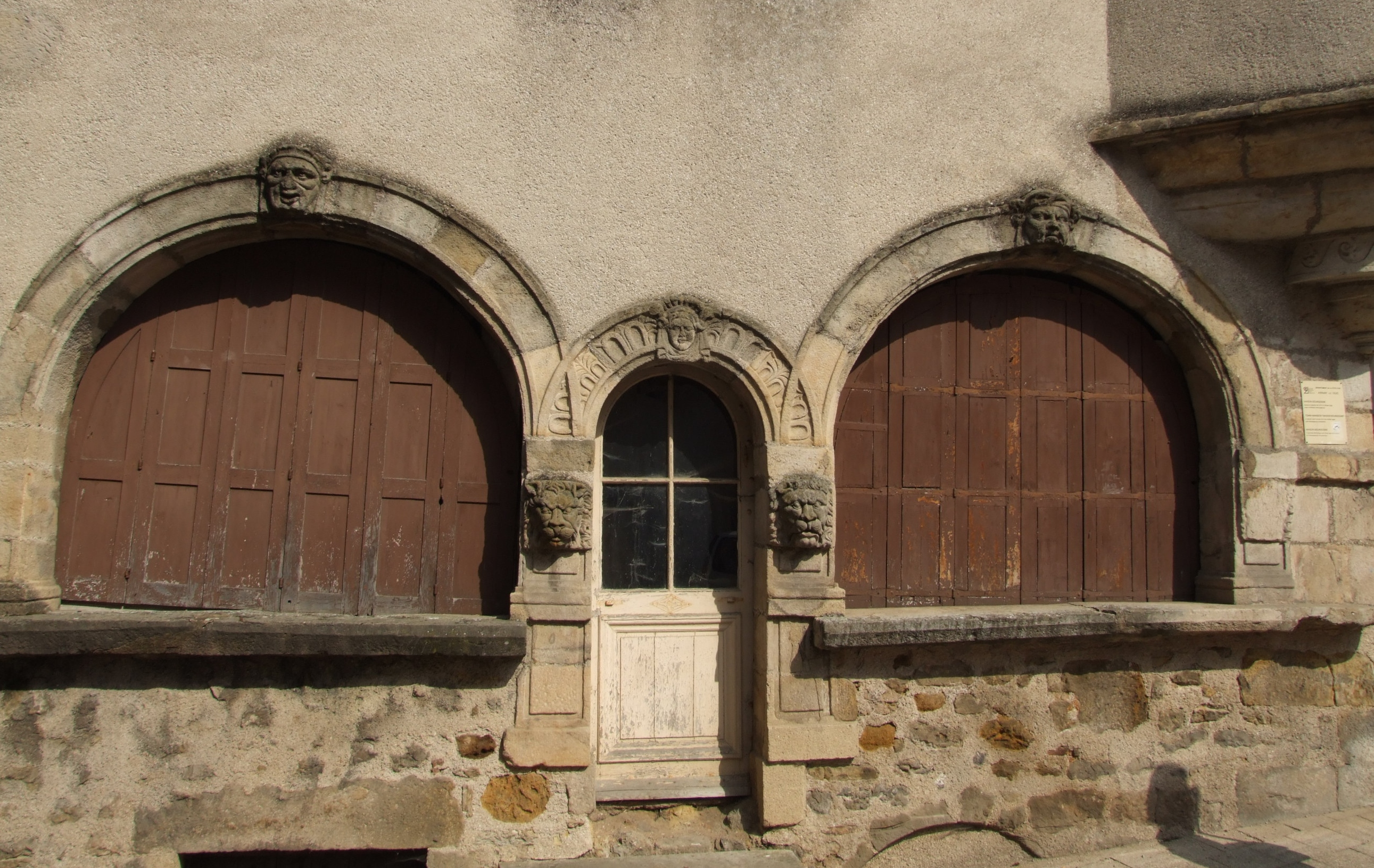
Windows on the Maison Bourgogne

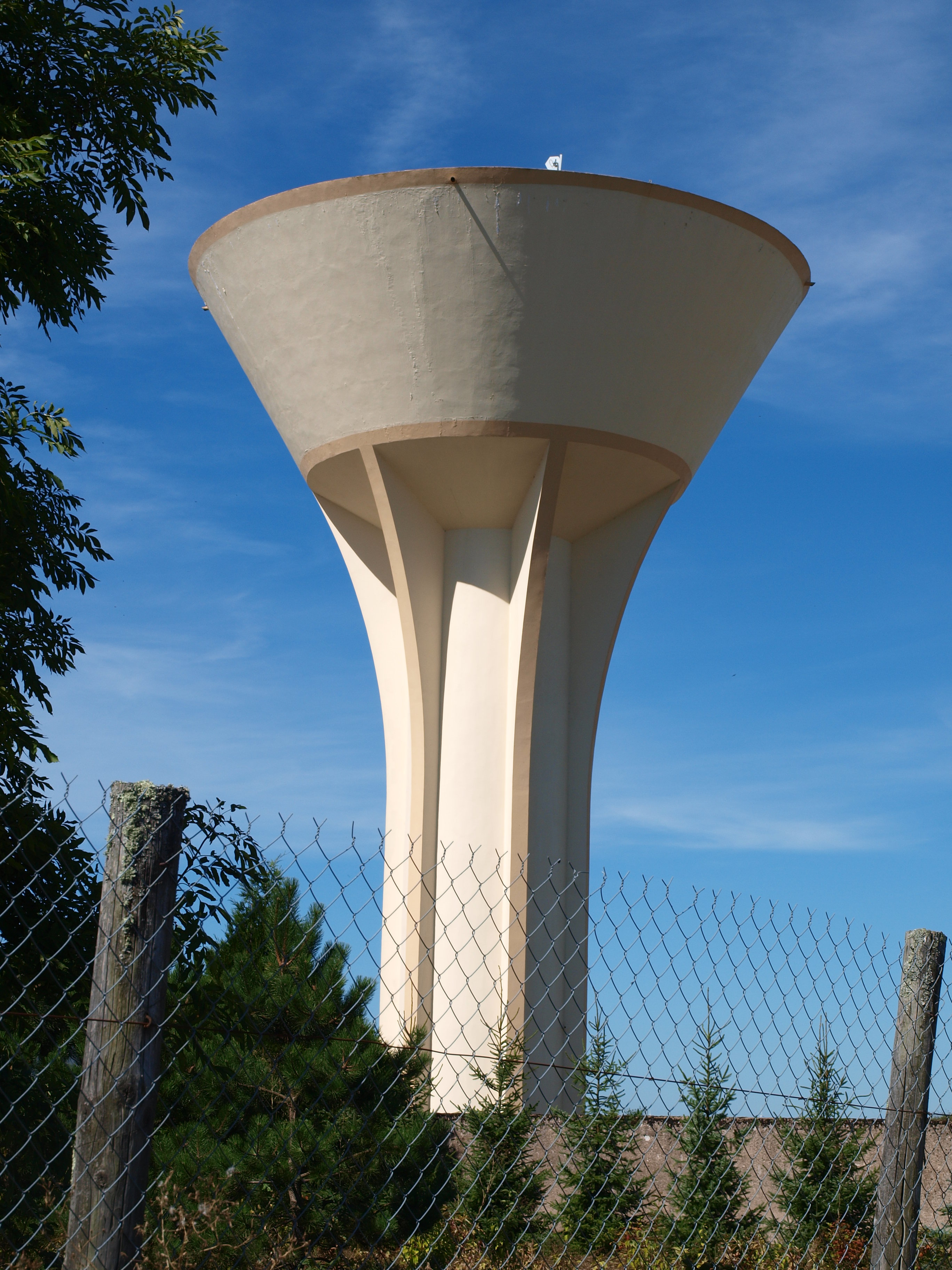
The water tower

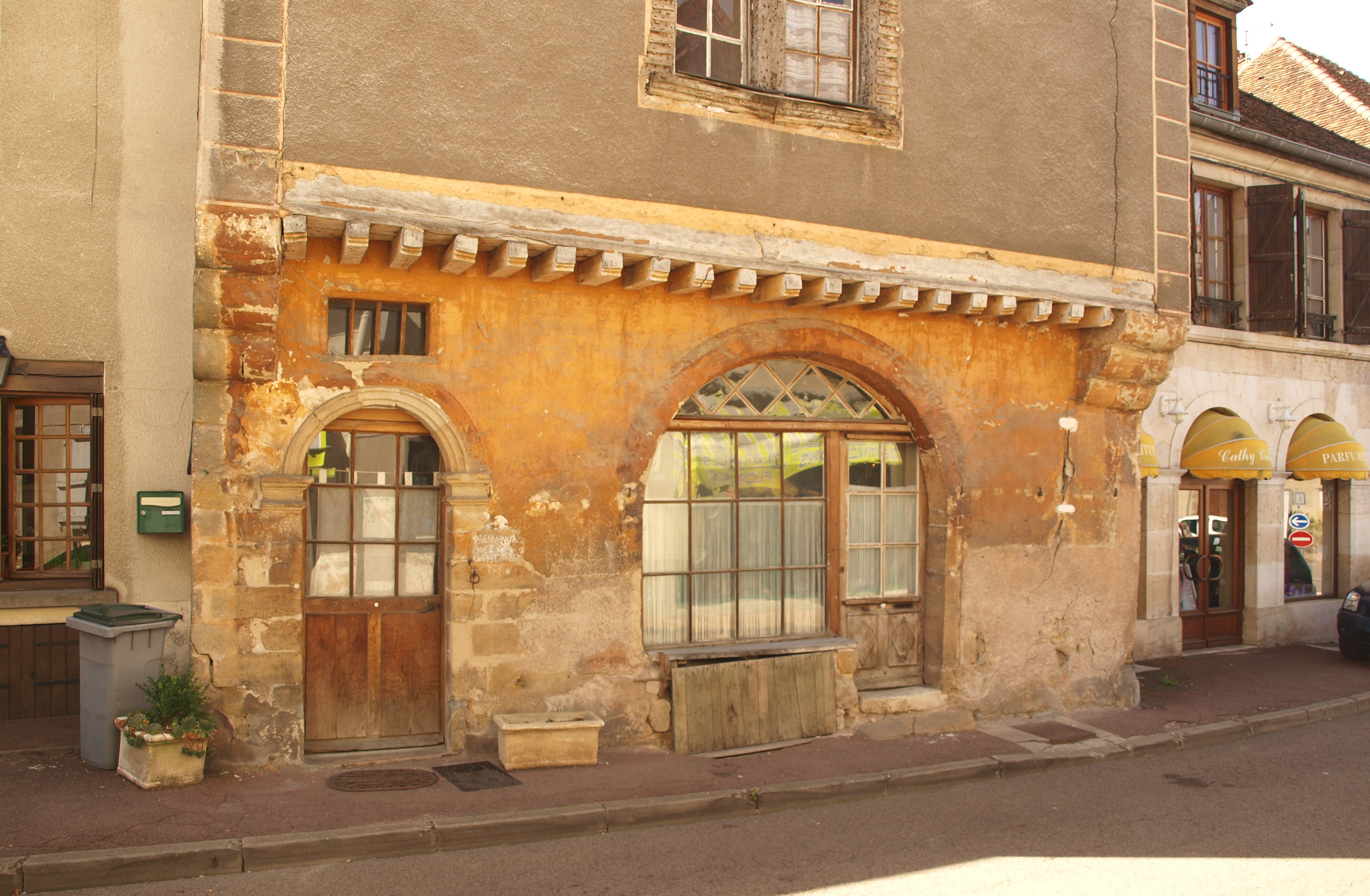
Shops

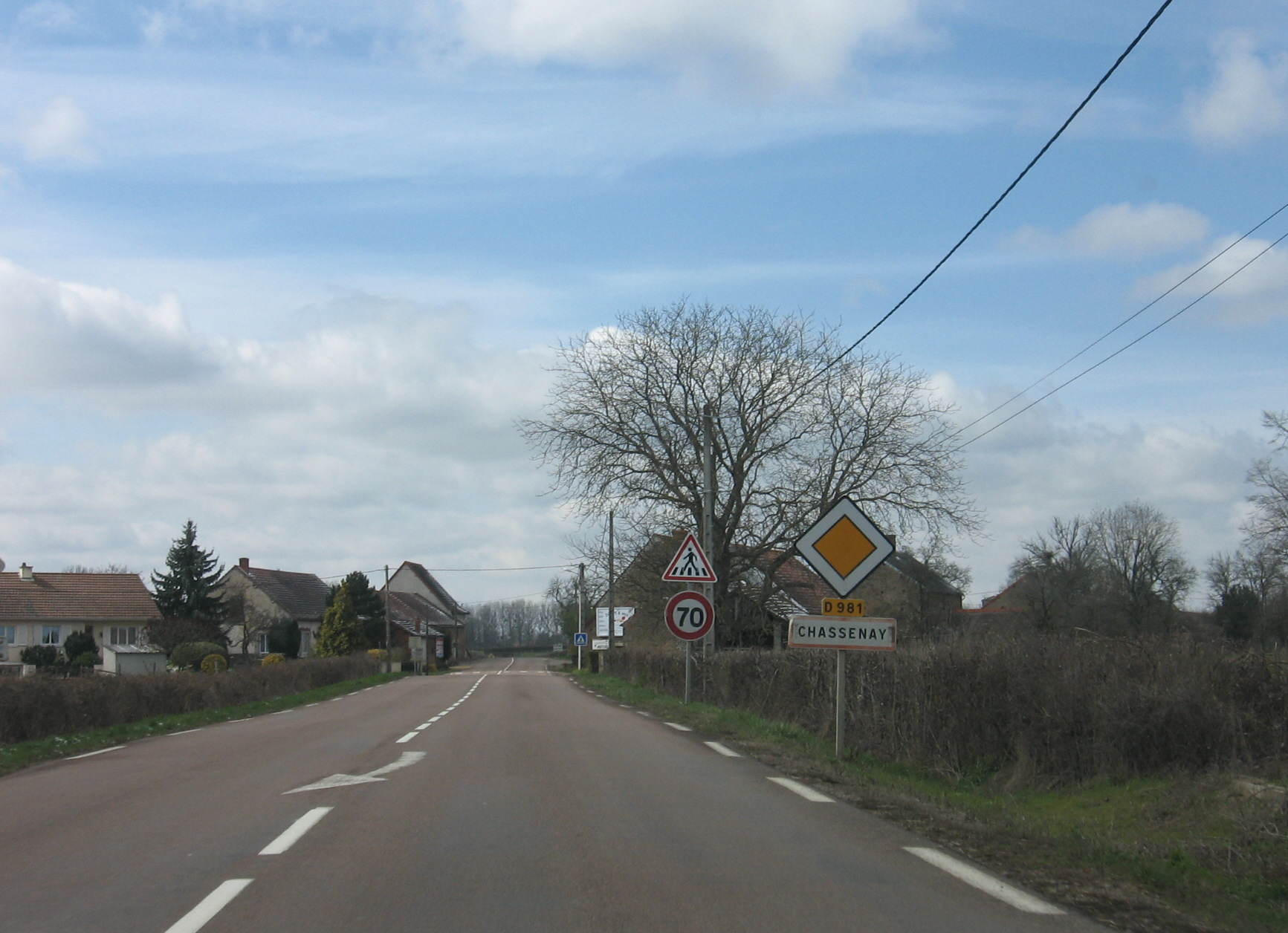
Chassenay Hamlet

=== Religious heritage ===
The commune has two religious buildings that are registered as historical monuments:

- The former Capuchin Convent (1776) The Convent, which is now the local hospital, contains four Paintings (16th-19th century) which are registered as historical objects.
- The former Priory of the Order of Saint-Benedict (15th century) is outside the walls in the Saint-Jacques district.
- The Church of Saint-Laurent was originally created as a fortified chapel for the Château de la Motte-Forte. In 1092 the chapel was donated to the town by the nobleman Gérard d'Arnay and from that time on served as the town's church. The church has particularly attractive stained glass windows. The church as it is known today was created during the 15th (nave) and 16th century (chancel and ten chapels). The loft and steeple were added during the 18th century. The Church contains many items that are registered as historical objects:
  - Statues (16th century)
  - A Group Sculpture: Virgin of Pity (16th century)
  - 6 Candlesticks and an Altar Cross (1860)
  - Paintings (15th-17th century)
  - The War Memorial (1924)
  - Monumental Paintings (19th century)
  - The Furniture in the Church
- The Convent of the Ursulines of Arnay-le-Duc was sold as national property on 7 December 1793 (17 Frimaire Year II) and is currently the Town Hall.

The Church of Saint-Laurent Picture Gallery

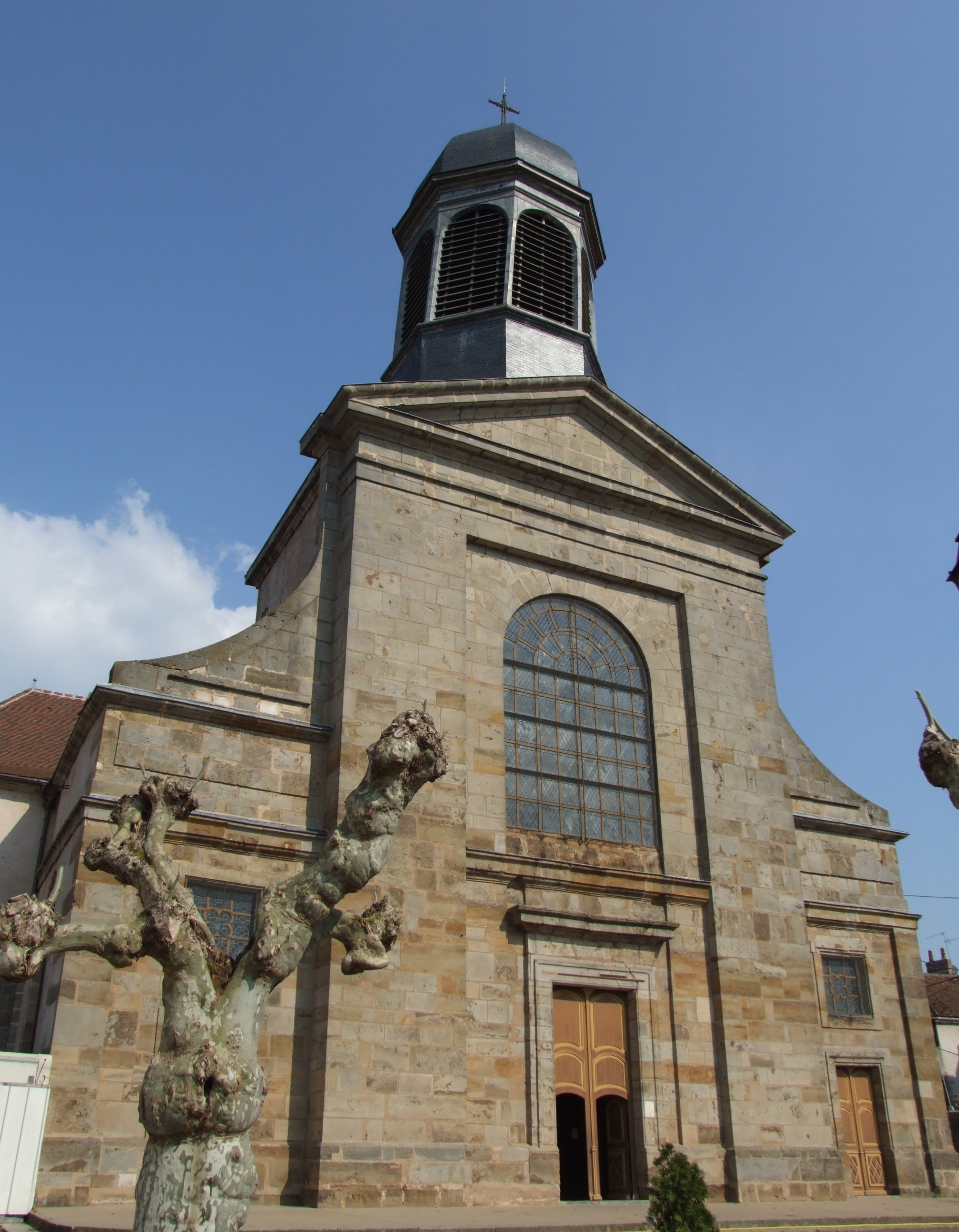
The Church

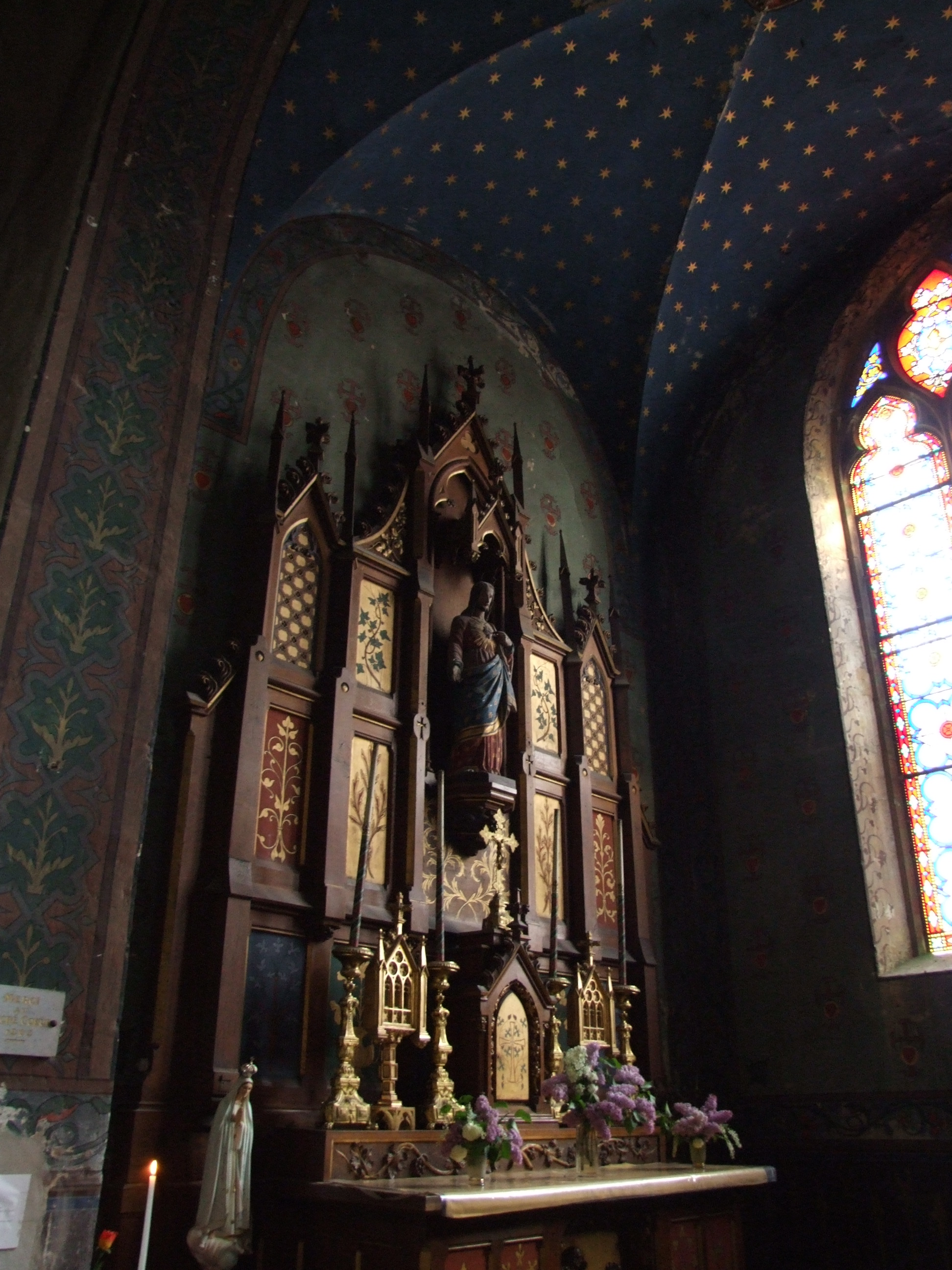
The altar

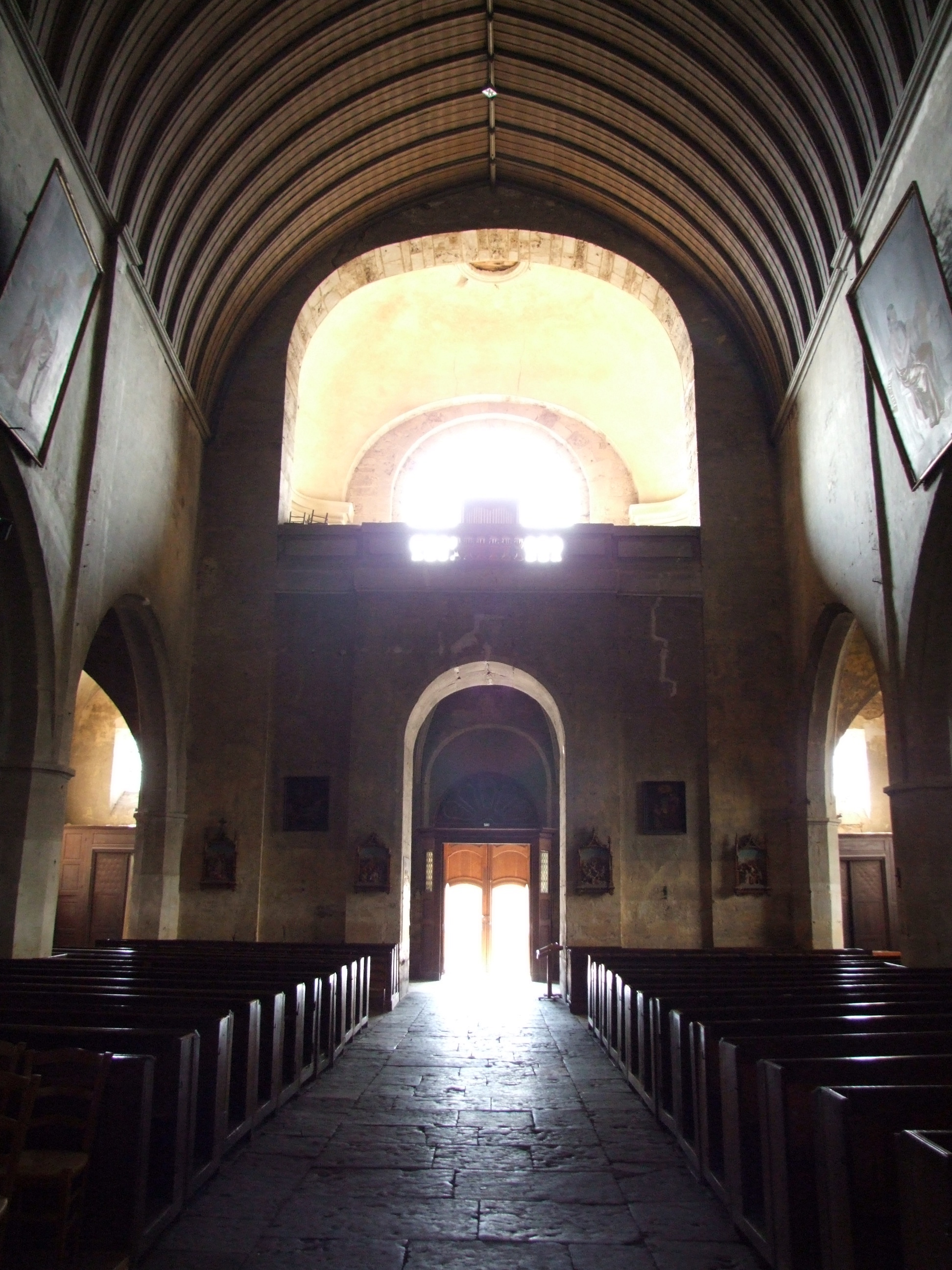
The nave

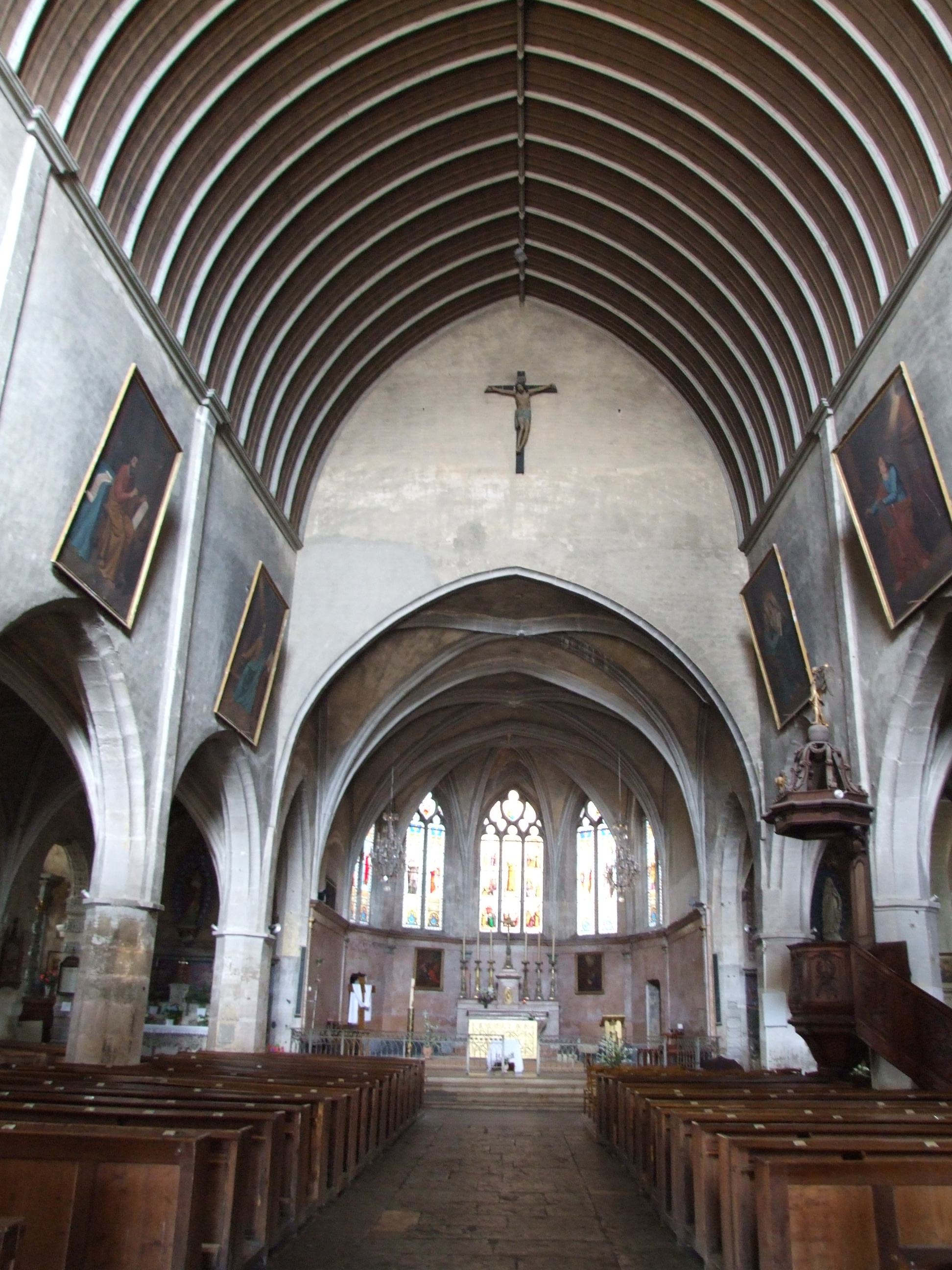
View of the altar

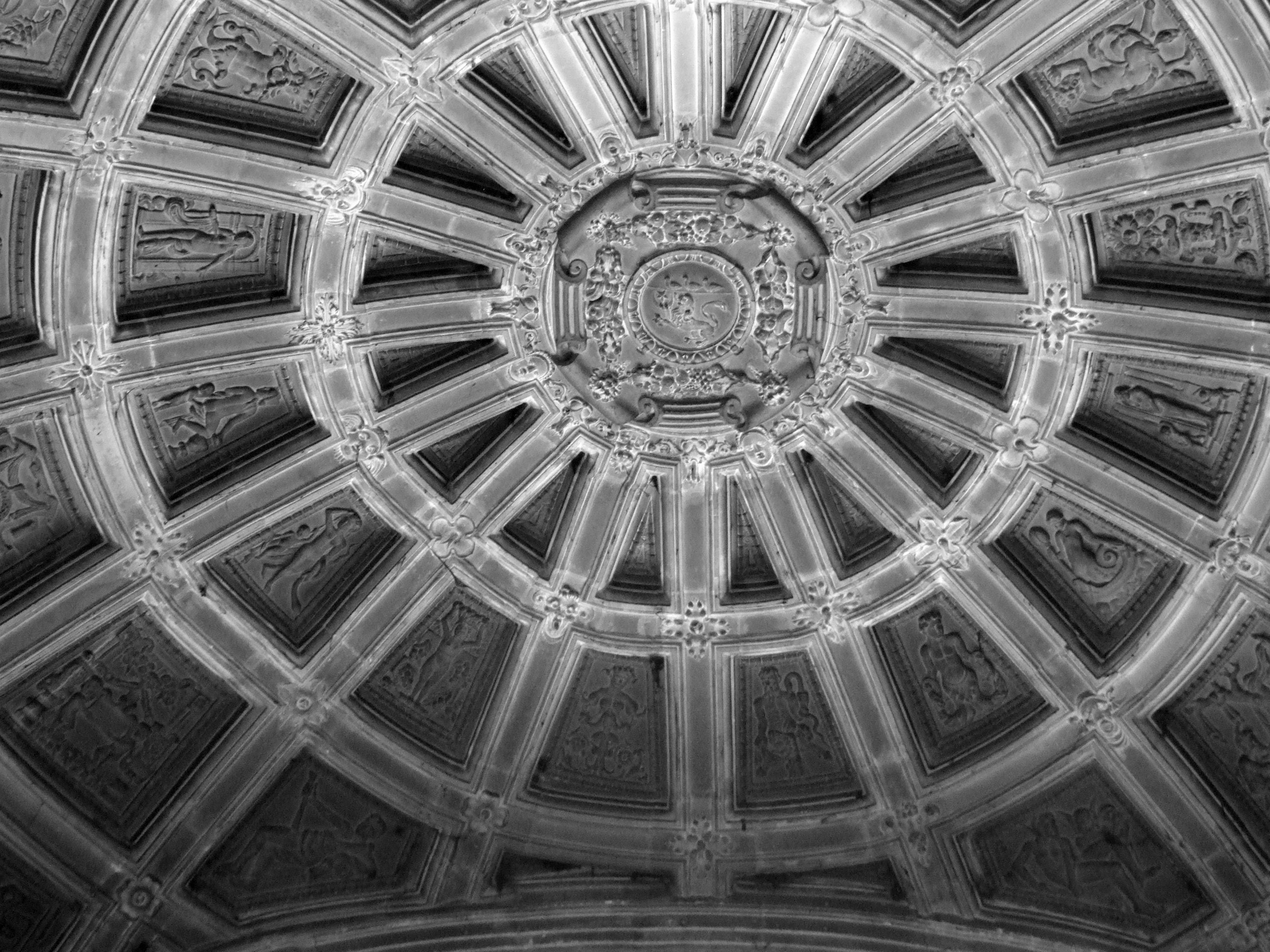
The ceiling

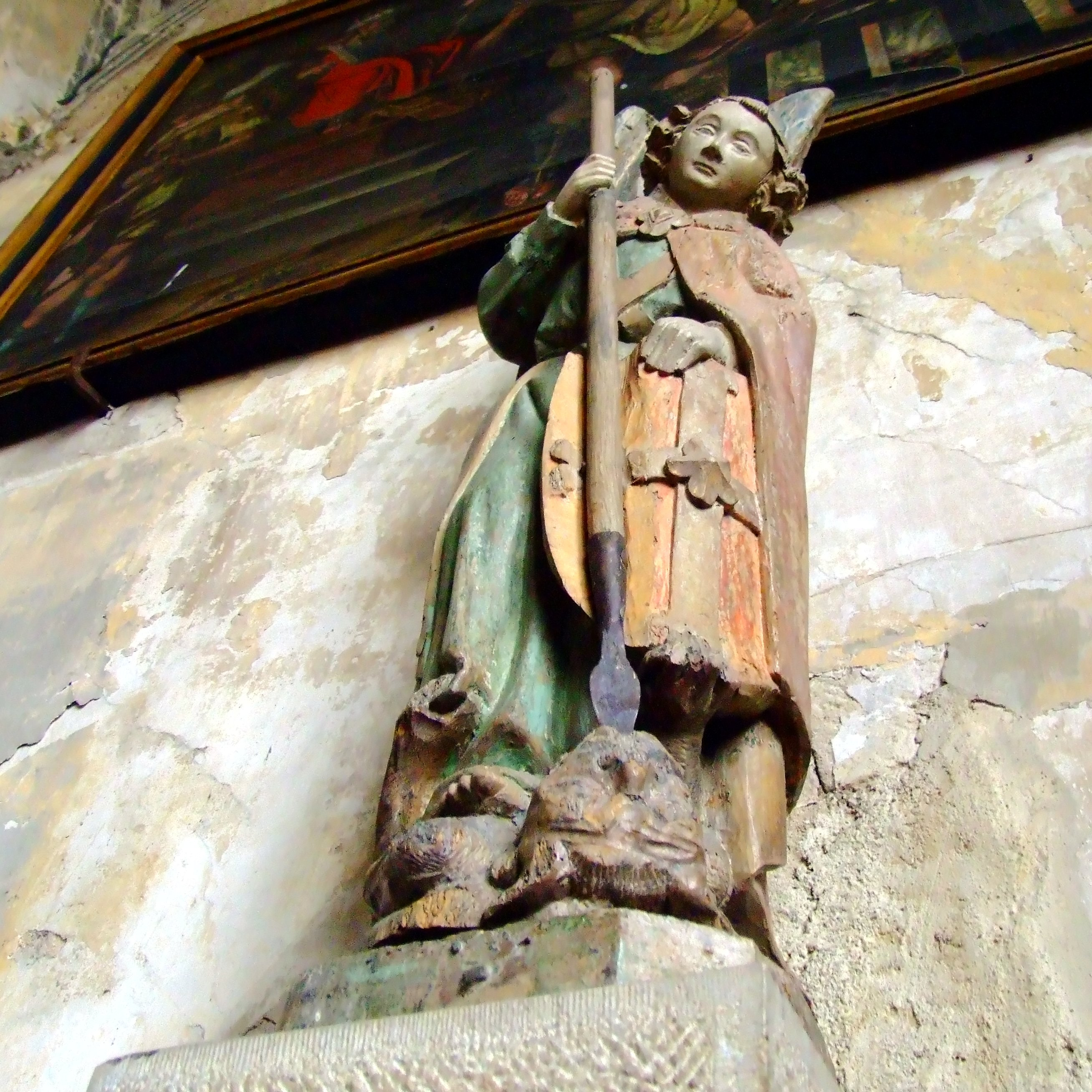
Saint-Michael in painted wood 16th century

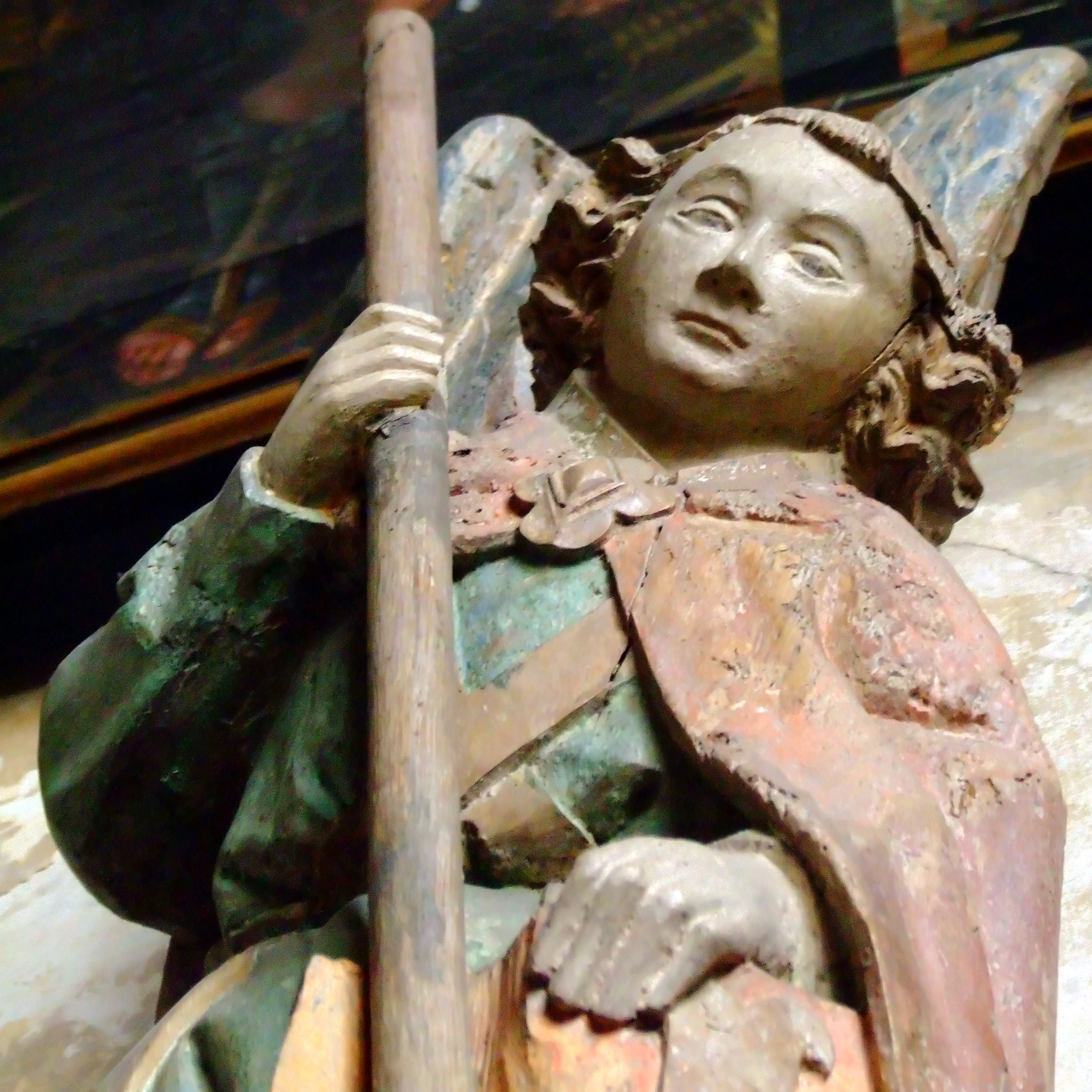
Saint-Michael in painted wood 16th century

=== Flowery Commune ===
Arnay-le-Duc has been awarded two flowers by the National Council of Towns and Villages in Bloom in the Competition of cities and villages in Bloom.

== Notable people linked to the commune ==
- Bonaventure des Périers, a French storyteller, may have been born in 1510 in Arnay-le-Duc and died there in 1543.
- Pierrette-Claudine Quarré d'Aligny de Jully (1727-), a nun in the convent of the Ursulines.
- Louise Thérèze Quarré d'Aligny de Jully (1729-), a nun in the convent of the Ursulines, sister of Pierette-Claudine.
- Jean Baptiste Fondard, born in Arnay-le-Duc on 31 October 1733 who, after a long career in the royal army, was elected on 3 September 1791 to be Lieutenant Colonel 2nd in command of the 2nd battalion of volunteers Côte-d'Or and died 11 June 1792 in the Battle of La Glisuelle.
- Charles Théveneau de Morande, pamphleteer, spy, controversial French journalist, born 9 November 1741 in Arnay-le-Duc and died there in 1805.
- General Baron Claude Testot-Ferry, veteran of the republican, Imperial, and Royal armies, Commander of the Legion of Honour, born in Arnay-le-Duc on 20 May 1773 and died in Châtillon-sur-Seine on 25 August 1856. A commemorative plaque was unveiled on 16 September 2007 at his birthplace (Rue des Trois Turelles) at a meeting organized in his memory by the town and the Napoleonic Remembrance chaired by Alain Pigeard.
- François Auguste Dubois, born in Arnay-le-Duc in 1814 and died in Paris in 1888, MP for Côte-d'Or between 1871 and 1888.
- Claude Guyot, born at Chassenay on 28 February 1890, his parents were farmers. He followed a sound education that made him a Bachelor of Arts and Associate of Grammar. A teacher of Latin and Greek at a high school in Dijon, he was promoted to be an Officer of the Legion of Honour for National Education. Married to Jeanne Vollot, daughter of a former mayor of Arnay-le-Duc, he had another link with the commune: his paternal grandfather was Republican mayor of Maligny. At its meeting of 27 December 1926, the municipal council of the city of Arnay-le-Duc elected Claude Guyot as Mayor and he remained until his death on 30 April 1965. Mobilized in 1939 then demobilised in 1940, he was dismissed in 1942 and the city council of Arnay-le-Duc was dissolved by ministerial order published in the Official Journal dated 8 March 1942. On 17 September 1944, Claude Guyot recovered his seat as mayor of Arnay-le-Duc and reappeared in the joy of liberation. During his absence Claude Guyot resisted the call from General de Gaulle and created, in November 1943, the first Departmental Committee for the Liberation of Côte d'Or which at Liberation earned him the Presidency of the Regional Committee and, in 1947, the Medal of the Resistance. A historian, he has published several books.
- Denis Barberet (1714-1770), physician, scientist.
- Jules Poillot, MP under the French Third Republic.
- Pierre Meunier, deputy mayor of the commune, born in Dijon on 15 August 1908, made a career in public finance and became financial controller of the Ministries of Public Health and of Labour. He made the acquaintance of Jean Moulin in the cabinet of Pierre Cot, the Air Minister in 1936. On 27 May 1943 he was appointed Secretary General of the National Council of the Resistance (CNR) chaired by Jean Moulin. After the arrest of Jean Moulin he continued the clandestine struggle alongside Georges Bidault who chaired the CNR. In 1945-46 Pierre Meunier Chief of Staff for Maurice Thorez, Minister of State in charge of public functions. In this capacity he developed the status of civil servants. Pierre Meunier filled many elective mandates: Member of the Consultative Assembly, he was elected General Counsel for Arnay-le-Duc in 1945, MP for Côte-d'Or from 1946 to 1958, vice-president of the National Assembly, regional adviser on Burgundy from 1976 to 1979. He was mayor of Arnay-le-Duc from 1971 to 1983.
- Jean Nasica, born in Prato in Corsica, the son of a soldier. He became a doctor and arrived by mistake in Arnay-le-Duc, where he settled as a general practitioner. In 1939 war broke out but Nasica, nicknamed "The Doc", continued to be the "doctor of the poor" but he incited hatred towards the German invaders. Later the Germans and Vichy Regime became interested in him and he participated in the creation of the maquis Rene Laforge. He eventually died during a shootout between resistance and German soldiers. Many monuments are dedicated to him. In 2008, a fictional documentary was made. It was the culmination of two years of work between students of the Pierre Meunier school and the Claude Guyot College.
- Albert Albrier, (1845-1878), writer.
- Tristan Maya, (1926-2000), writer, poet, literary critic, novelist, member of the Academy of Morvan.
- François Deroye (1884-1914), aviator
- Paul Lacoste (1920-1995), surgeon, professor of anatomy, and painter.

== Television ==
The town was the setting of the television show Coup de foudre au prochain village (Thunderbolt in the next village) broadcast on TF1 in February 2013.

== Bibliography ==
- Adkins, Lesley & Adkins, Roy A. (1996). Dictionary of Roman Religion. Facts on File, inc. ISBN 0-8160-3005-7.
- Albert Albrier, The Mayors of Arnay-le-Duc, J.-E. Rabutot, Dijon, 1868, 2nd edition by Tristan Maya, 1985 (in French)
- Ignacio Catalan, "Luna Lunera, of Arnay-le-Duc at Beaune, un parcours de jeunesse". (in French)
- Pierre Creusvaux. Roman Ways in Arnay Country. Les Amis du Pays d'Arnay, 2004. (in French)
- Didier Godard, The Châteaux of the Canton of Arnay-le-Duc, Editions d'Arnay, 37 rue César Lavirotte, 21230 Arnay-le-Duc, 2009. (in French)
- Didier Godard, Historical Guide to Arnay-le-Duc (éd. d'Arnay, 2009) (in French)
- Didier Godard, The Cemetery at Arnay (éd. d'Arnay, 2009). (in French)
- Didier Godard, The clog maker of Arnay, Editions d'Arnay, 2010. (in French)
- Didier Godard, The Lady's Way. Adelaide and Victoria of Versailles at Trieste by Arnay-le-Duc, Editions d'Arnay, 2012 (in French)
- J.P.C. Lavirotte, Annals of the town of Arnay-le-Duc in Burgundy. Preface by Jean Richard. Laffitte Reprints, 1980. (in French)
- Bernard Leblanc. Arnay-le-Duc and its canton through old postcards. Préface de Pierre Meunier. Les Amis du Pays d'Arnay, 1980. (in French)
- Bernard Leblanc. Churches and Chapels. Saints in the canton of Arnay-le-Duc. Les Amis du Pays d'Arnay, 2008. (in French)
- Jean Prudhon, The protestants of Arnay-le-Duc from its origins to the Edict of Nantes, Editions d'Arnay, 2012. (in French)
- Denis Roche. Arnay-le-Duc in torment 1939-1945. Chez l'auteur, 2011. (in French)

== See also ==
- Communes of the Côte-d'Or department
- Parc naturel régional du Morvan
