= Maligny =

Maligny may refer to:

- Maligny, Côte-d'Or, a commune in the French region of Bourgogne
- Maligny, Yonne, a commune in the French region of Bourgogne
