= Maligny, Côte-d'Or =

Maligny
- Commune
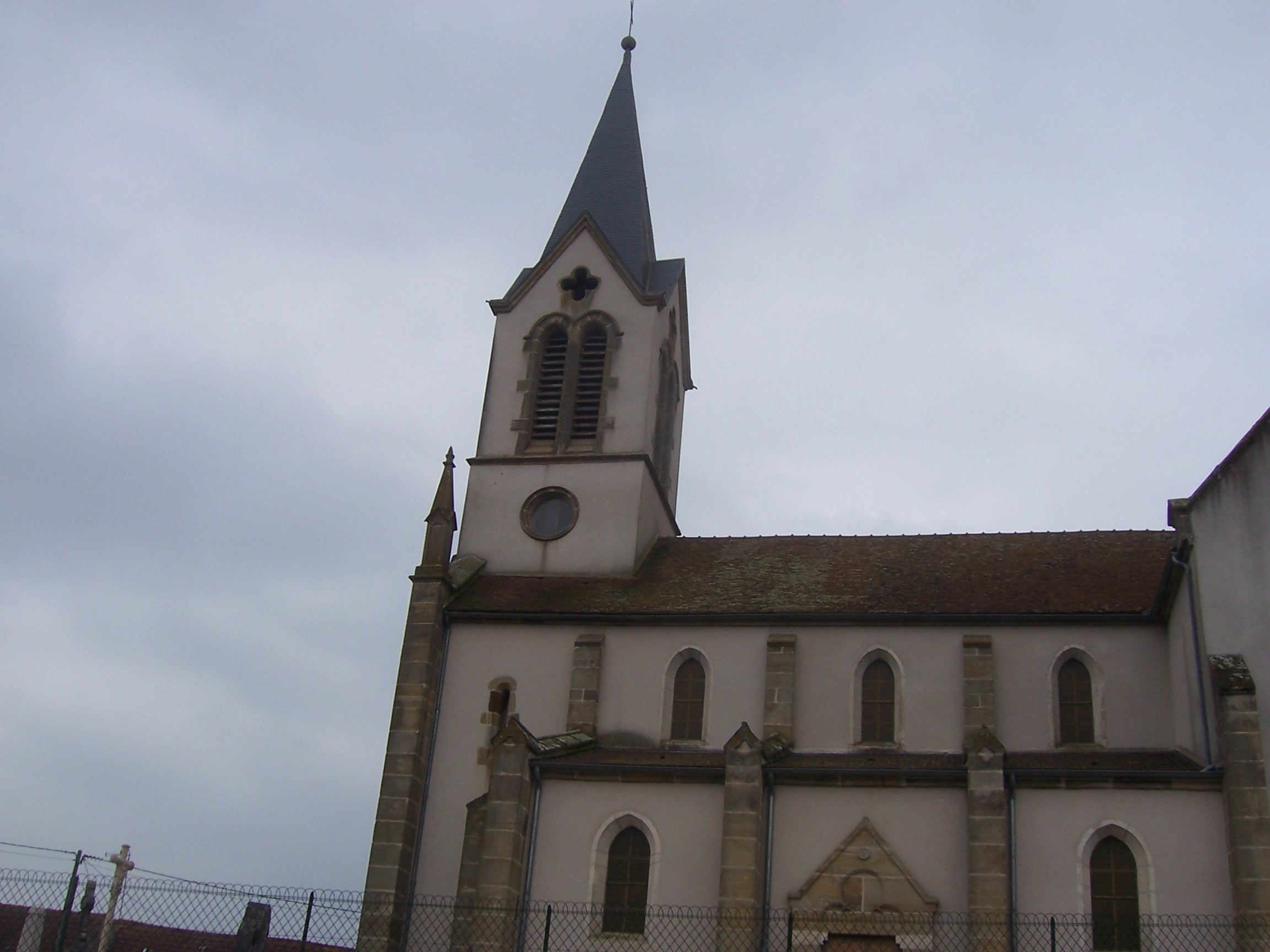
- The church in Maligny
- Location of Maligny
- Location within France Location within Bourgogne-Franche-Comté
- Coordinates: 47°05′10″N 4°30′36″E
- Country: France
- Region: Bourgogne-Franche-Comté
- Department: Côte-d'Or
- Arrondissement: Beaune
- Canton: Arnay-le-Duc
- Intercommunality: Pays Arnay Liernais

Government
  - Mayor (2020–2026): Martine Desbois
- Area^{1}: 16.72 km^{2} (6.46 sq mi)
- Highest elevation: 447 m (1,467 ft)
- Lowest elevation: 331 m (1,086 ft)
- Population (2023): 171
  - Density: 10.2/km^{2} (26.5/sq mi)
- Time zone: UTC+01:00 (CET)
  - Summer (DST): UTC+02:00 (CEST)
- INSEE/Postal code: 21374 /21230
- ^{1} French Land Register data, which excludes lakes, ponds, glaciers > 1 km^{2} (0.386 sq mi or 247 acres) and river estuaries.

Maligny (French pronunciation: [maliɲi]) is a commune in the Côte-d'Or department in eastern France.

== Population ==
Historical population
Year	Pop.	±% p.a.
1968	319	—
1975	282	−1.75%
1982	254	−1.48%
1990	202	−2.82%
1999	216	+0.75%
2007	199	−1.02%
2012	218	+1.84%
2017	212	−0.56%
2023	171	−3.52%
Source: INSEE

== See also ==
- Communes of the Côte-d'Or department
