= Arrans =

- Commune
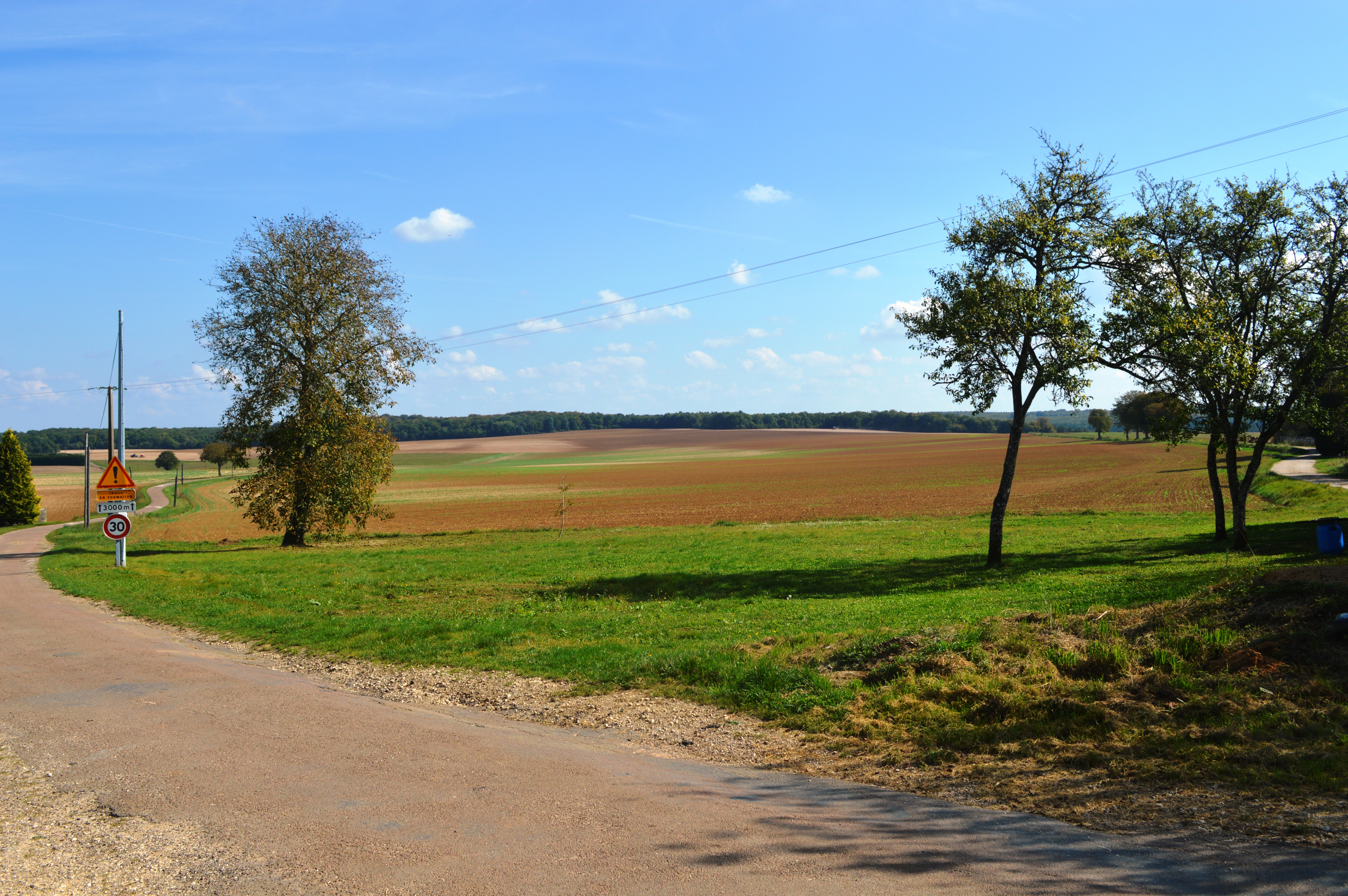
- The landscape of Arrans
- Location of Arrans
- Location within France Location within Bourgogne-Franche-Comté
- Coordinates: 47°41′48″N 4°19′10″E
- Country: France
- Region: Bourgogne-Franche-Comté
- Department: Côte-d'Or
- Arrondissement: Montbard
- Canton: Montbard
- Intercommunality: CC Montbardois

Government
  - Mayor (2020–2026): Françoise May
- Area^{1}: 10.52 km^{2} (4.06 sq mi)
- Elevation: 320 m (1,050 ft)
- Highest elevation: 332 m (1,089 ft)
- Lowest elevation: 249 m (817 ft)
- Population (2023): 65
  - Density: 6.2/km^{2} (16/sq mi)
- Time zone: UTC+01:00 (CET)
  - Summer (DST): UTC+02:00 (CEST)
- INSEE/Postal code: 21025 /21500
- ^{1} French Land Register data, which excludes lakes, ponds, glaciers > 1 km^{2} (0.386 sq mi or 247 acres) and river estuaries.

Arrans (French pronunciation: [aʁɑ̃]) is a commune in the Côte-d'Or department in the Bourgogne-Franche-Comté region of eastern France.

== Geography ==
Arrans is located some 6 km north of Montbard and 5 km south-east of Asnières-en-Montagne. Access to the commune is by the D5 road from Montbard in the south which passes through the heart of the commune and the village and continues north to Verdonnet. The D119 road also links the village to Asnières-en-Montagne in the north-west. The D5E branches off the D5 in the commune and goes south-west to Saint-Rémy. The commune is mostly forest with farmland around and east of the village.

== Administration ==
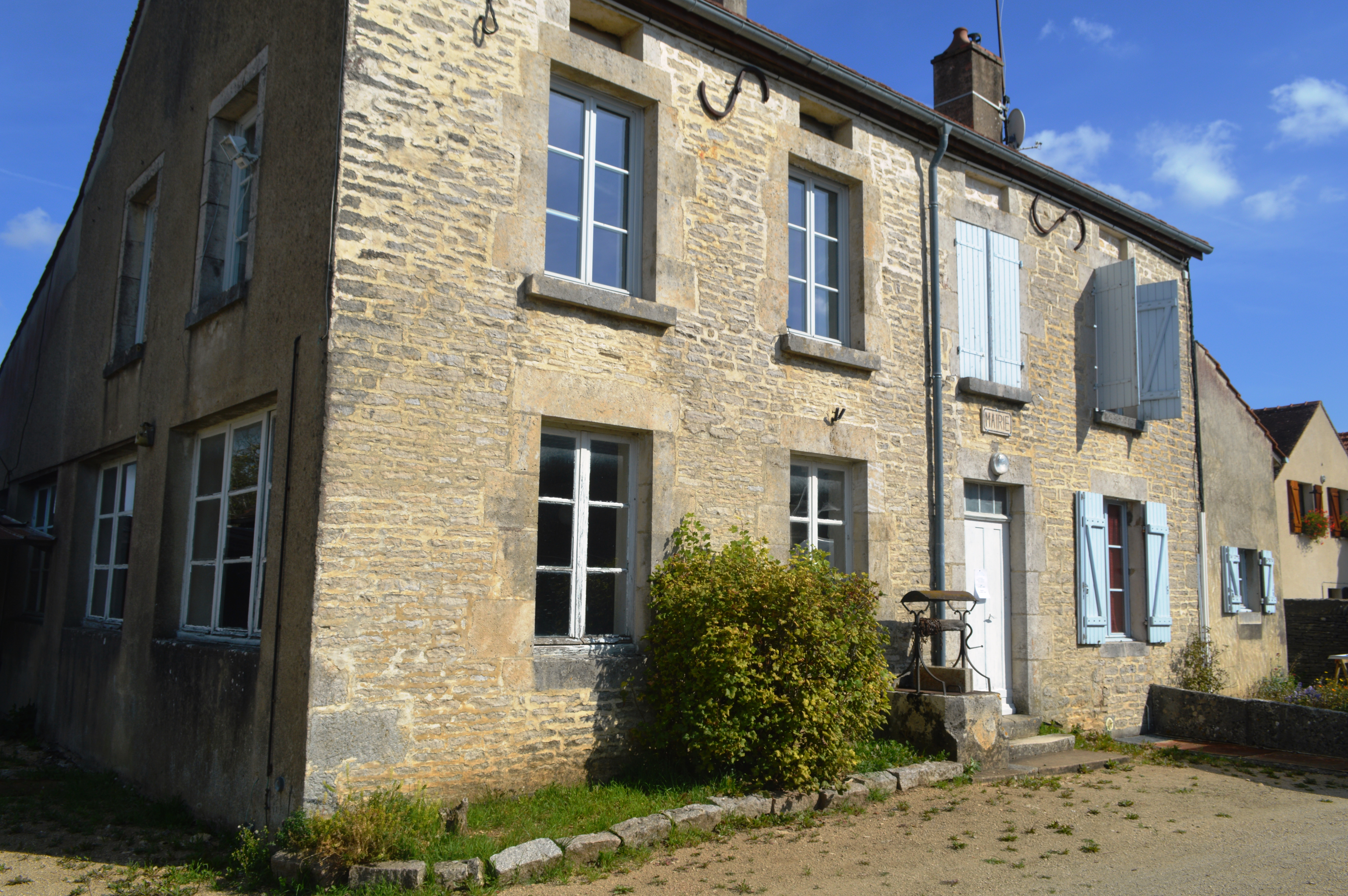
The Town Hall

List of Successive Mayors

From	To	Name
2001	2008	Jean-Pierre Vaillant
2008	2014	Thomas Vaillant
2014	2020	Yolaine de Courson
2020	2026	Françoise May

== Demography ==
Historical population

Year	Pop.	±% p.a.
1793	186	—
1821	179	−0.14%
1846	204	+0.52%
1872	184	−0.40%
1901	138	−0.99%
1926	104	−1.13%
1946	105	+0.05%
1962	95	−0.62%
1968	71	−4.74%

Year	Pop.	±% p.a.
1975	62	−1.92%
1982	85	+4.61%
1990	86	+0.15%
1999	82	−0.53%
2007	68	−2.31%
2012	68	+0.00%
2017	73	+1.43%
2023	65	−1.92%

Source: EHESS and INSEE

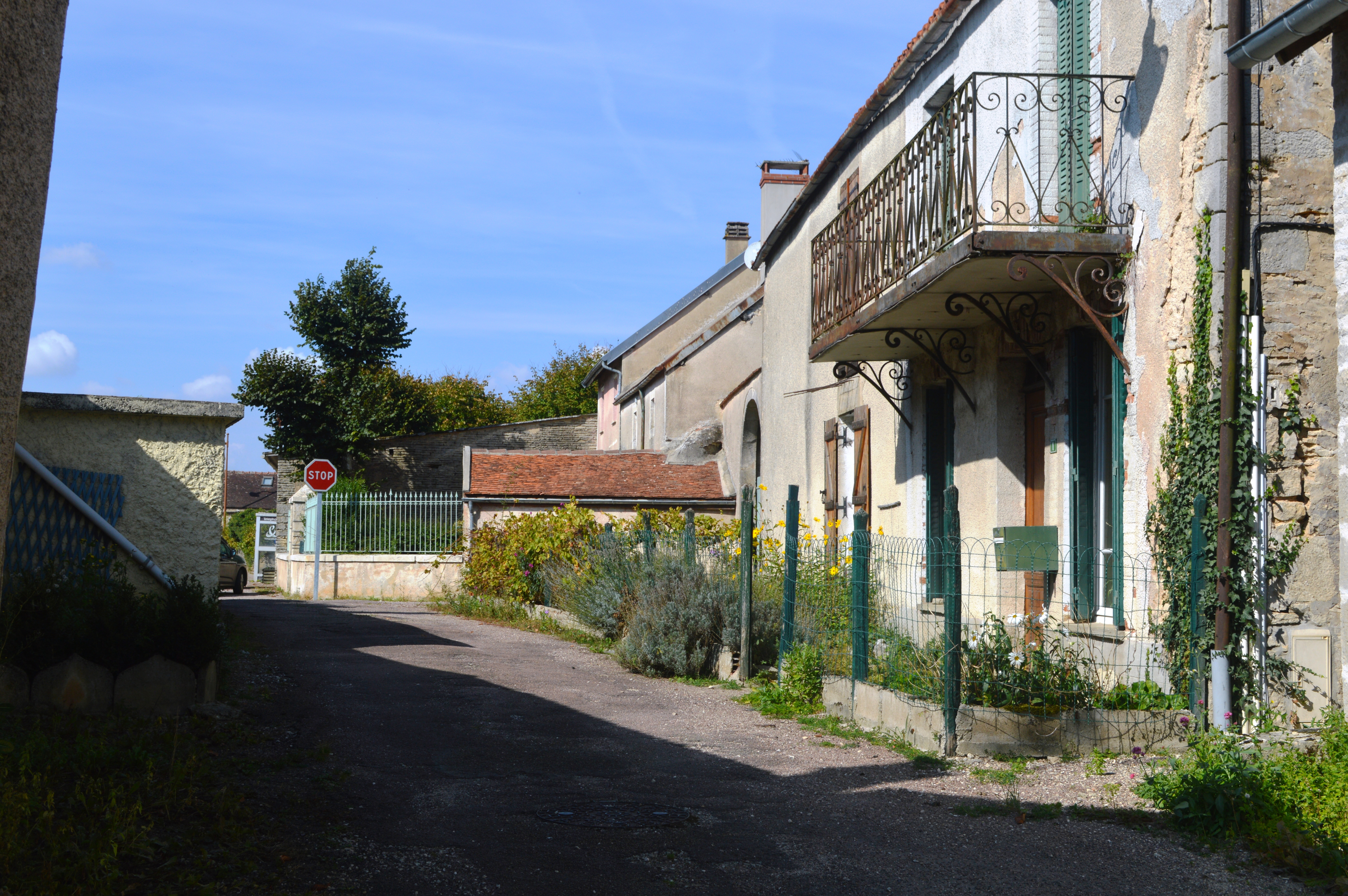
A street in Arrans

== Religious heritage ==
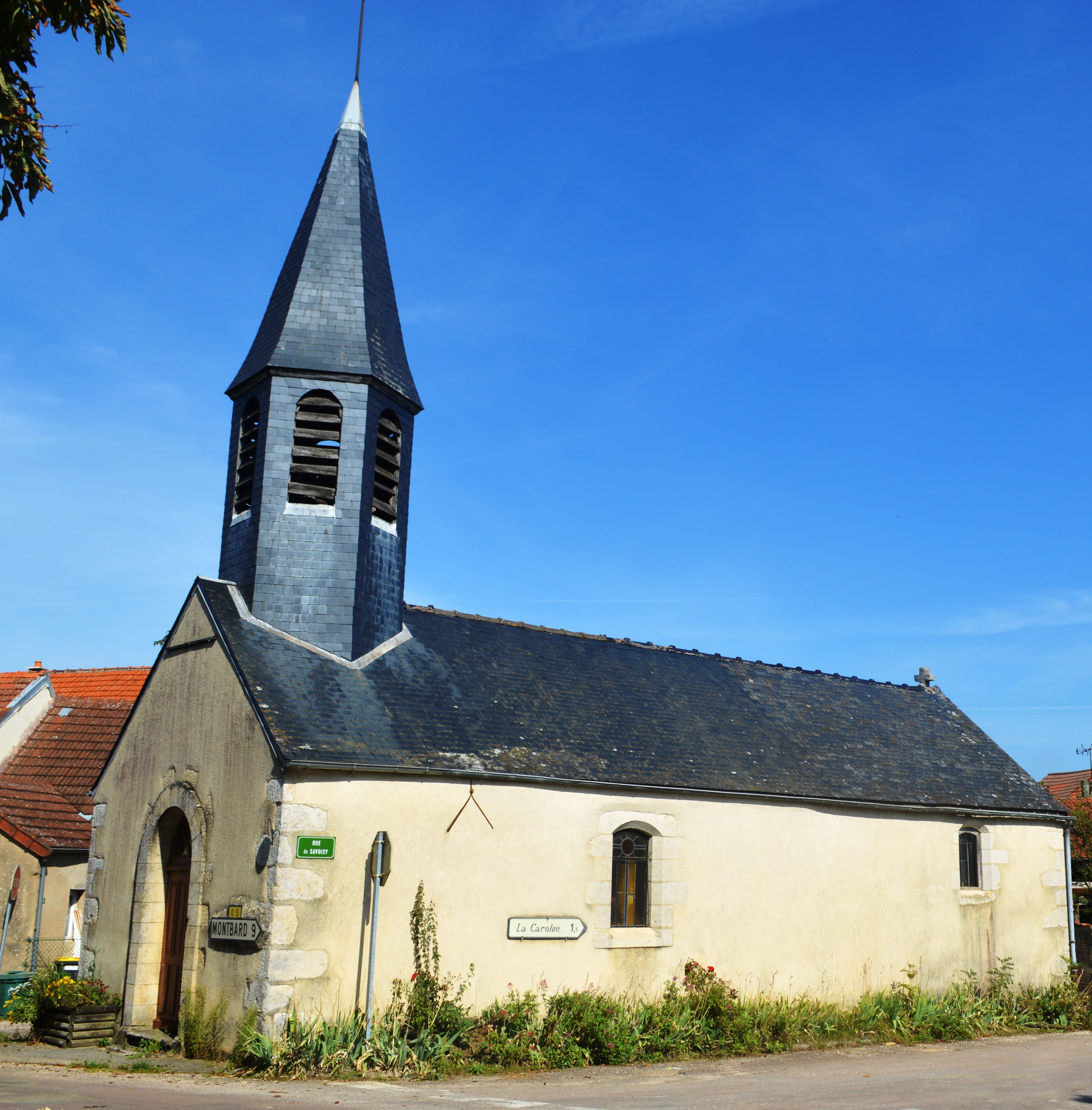
The Church of Saint-Pierre-Célestin

The Parish Church of Saint-Pierre-Célestin contains 2 Monumental Paintings of Saint Ambroise and Saint Nicolas (16th century) that are registered as an historical object.

== See also ==
- Communes of the Côte-d'Or department
