= Pierre Joigneaux =

French politician

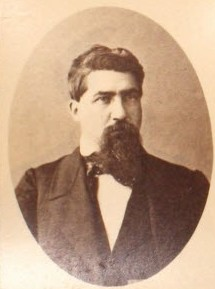

French Senator
- In office 4 January 1891 – 26 January 1892
- Constituency: Côte-d'Or

French Deputy
- In office 8 February 1871 – 11 November 1889
- Constituency: Côte-d'Or
- In office 4 May 1848 – 2 December 1851
- Constituency: Côte-d'Or

General Councilor of Côte-d'Or
- In office 1870–1882
- Preceded by: Gérard Chauvelot-Girard
- Succeeded by: Henri Welter
- Constituency: Beaune

Personal details
- Born: 23 December 1815 Ruffey-lès-Beaune
- Died: 26 January 1892 (76) Asnières
- Party: Far Left (1871–1876), Republican Union (1876–1889)
- Profession: Politician

Pierre Joigneaux (23 December 1815 in Ruffey-lès-Beaune – 26 January 1892 in Asnières) was a French journalist and politician of the far-left.

== Early life ==
Joigneaux studied at the Central School of Paris and entered into the democratic presse at the age of 25.

A collaborator of the Journal du Peuple, the Corsaire, the Charvari, and Feuille du Village he put up a strong opposition to the government of Louis Philippe d'Orleans, and was condemned in 1838 to 4 years in prison for articles published in The Free Man, a republican journal printed in secret.

During this time he published another journal, Les Prisons de Paris.

In Beaune, 1843, he published the journal, Chronique de Bourgogne then La Sentinelle beaunoise in 1845. In Dijon he published: le Courrier de la Côte d'Or, with others including Mathieu de la Drôme, le Vigneron des Deux-Bourgognes and la Revue Industrielle et agricole de la Bourgogne.

He continued publishing various journals, both republican and otherwise, mostly agronomy until the Springtime of the Peoples.

== Political career ==
His political life began in 1848, he was named vice commissioner of the Republic in the arrondissements of Châtillon-sur-Seine. He was elected representative of the people at the constituent assembly, where he sat on the far left. He was considered as a candidate for president in 1852.

As a republican, he was opposed to the coup of Louis-Napoleon Bonaparte, and subsequently exiled to Saint-Hubert, Belgium, where he became friends with Alexandre Dumas. He continued his studies of agronomy and publishes various works in Brussels. He did not return to France until 1859.

Deputised in 1871, he was consistently reëlected. In May 1877, he was a signatory of the Manifesto of the 363. He then became general councillor of the Canton of Southern Beaune and later a senator of Côte-d'Or.

== Publications ==
Joigneaux published many considerable works. Outside of periodical publications which he drafted and directed and many articles published in various journals, his full list of works is as follows:

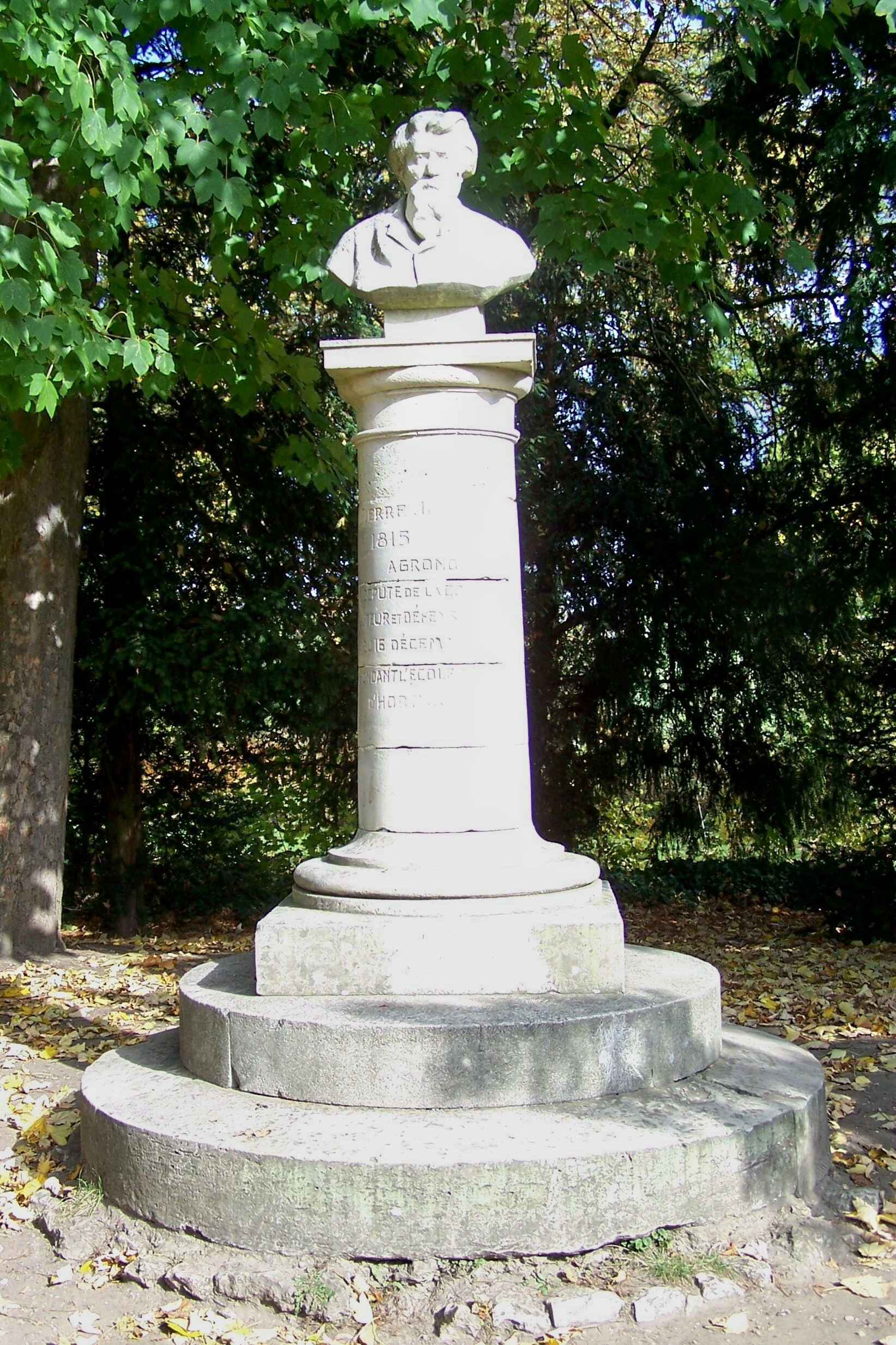
Memorial to Pierre Joigneaux in Balbi Park at Versailles.

- Fragments historiques sur la ville de Beaune et ses environs (1839) ;
- Les Prisons de Paris, par un ancien détenu (1842) ;
- Histoire anecdotique des professions en France (1843) ;
- Histoire des paysans sous la royauté (1850) ;
- La Chimie du cultivateur ;
- Lettres aux paysans ;
- Lettre trouvée à la porte d’une caserne ;
- Le Dictionnaire d’agriculture pratique, in collaboration with Charles Moreau (1854) ;
- Engrais et Amendements ;
- Instructions agricoles ;
- Les Arbres fruitiers (1860) ;
- Le Livre de la ferme et des maisons de campagne (1862) ;
- Conférences sur le jardinage et les arbres fruitiers (1870) ;
- Culture de la vigne en Belgique ;
- Petite École d’agriculture (1875) ;
- L’Art de produire de bonnes graines ;
- In 1891, he published the Souvenirs historiques. His archives are conserved at the municipal archives of Beaune where they were donated by his descendants in 2020.

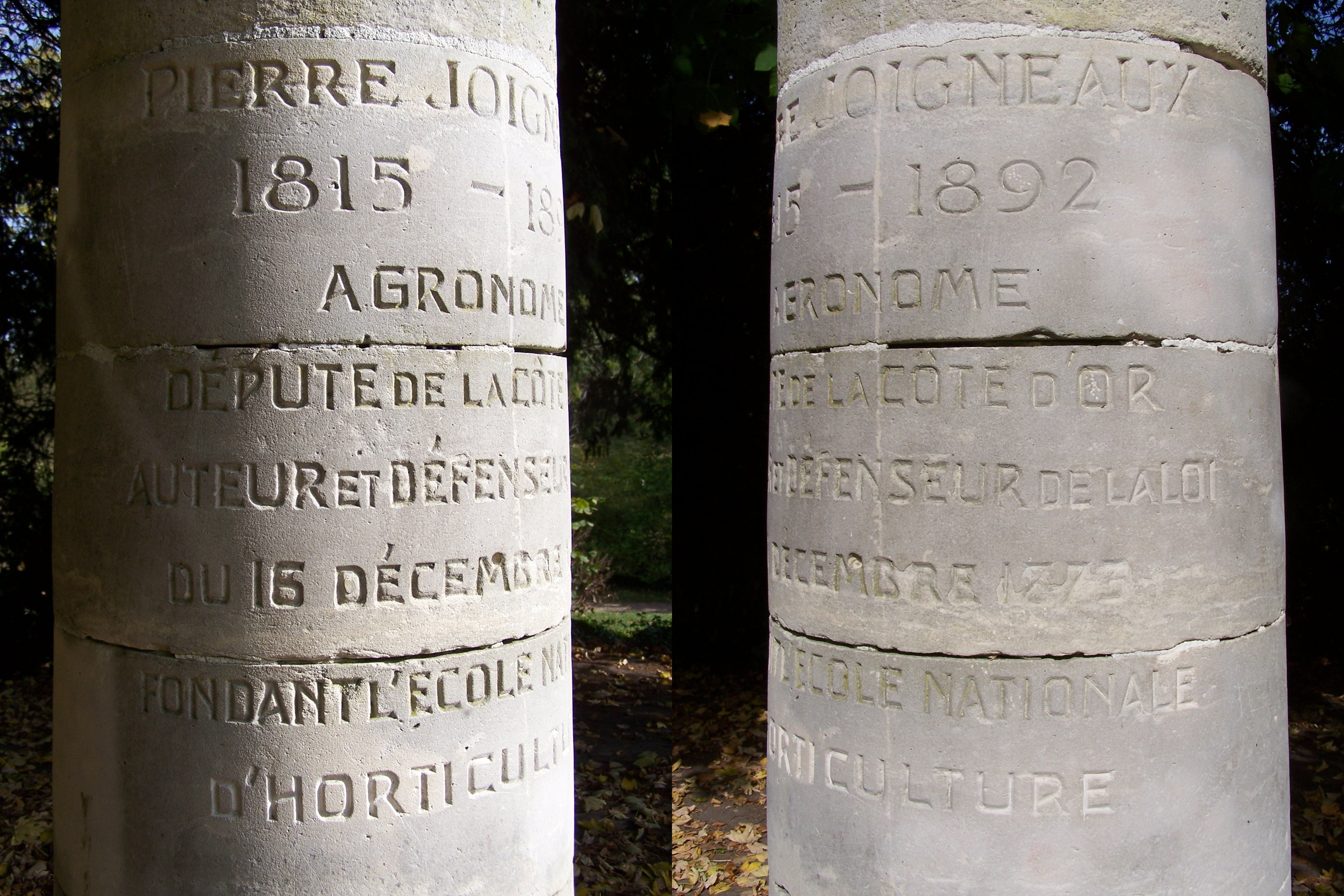
Memorial inscription
