= Rugiluclivina =

Scientific classification
- Kingdom: Animalia
- Phylum: Arthropoda
- Class: Insecta
- Order: Coleoptera
- Suborder: Adephaga
- Family: Carabidae
- Subtribe: Clivinina
- Genus: Rugiluclivina; Balkenohl, 1996

Genus of beetles

Rugiluclivina is a genus of beetles in the family Carabidae, containing the following species:

- Rugiluclivina alutacea (Lesne, 1896)
- Rugiluclivina julieni (Lesne, 1896)
- Rugiluclivina leonina Balkenohl, 1999
- Rugiluclivina promineoculata Balkenohl, 2015
- Rugiluclivina puncticollis Balkenohl, 1996
- Rugiluclivina reticulata Balkenohl, 1996
- Rugiluclivina rugicollis Balkenohl, 1996
- Rugiluclivina wrasei Balkenohl, 1996
