= Ferdinand Rochet =

French footballer (1889–1929)

Personal information
- Full name: Ferdinand Charles Rochet
- Date of birth: 6 April 1899
- Place of birth: 6th arrondissement of Paris, France
- Date of death: 29 September 1929 (aged 30)
- Place of death: Asnières, France
- Height: 1.66 m (5 ft 5 in)
- Position: Forward

Senior career*
Years	Team	Apps	(Gls)
1912–1914	CA Boulonnais		
1914–1916	Red Star AC		

International career
1913	France	1	(0)
- * Club domestic league appearances and goals

Ferdinand Charles Rochet (6 April 1889 – 29 September 1929) was a French footballer who played as a right winger for Red Star AC and the French national team in the mid-1910s.

== Career ==
Born in the 6th arrondissement of Paris on 6 April 1889, Rochet was a stocky player, measuring 1.66 meters and weighing 69 kilograms, being described as "fast, crosses perfectly, and heads wonderfully" in November 1912. Earlier that year, he had joined the ranks of CA Boulonnais, a club affiliated to the FCAF, and with whom he played for two years, until 1914.

On 22 December 1912, Rochet started for Team B in the "selection match", an annual test match for the French national team; the following day, the journalists of the French newspaper L'Auto (the forerunner of L'Équipe) stated that he was the only one who "played a very good game" and was "a player to keep an eye on". The following month, on 12 January 1913, he earned his first (and only) international cap for France, starting as a winker in a friendly match against Italy. As the main star of CAB's team, he was used with the attack constantly going through him, so he tried to make the difference on his own, making two brilliant plays, including a shot from distance, but this playing style ended up "distracting" his teammates and confusing the selectors, who had expected the winger to put himself at the service of the attacking trio; France won 1–0. Despite featuring in this match, Rochet was retrospectly not deemed to have "international class" by the weekly French newspaper Le Miroir des sports in November 1925.

In 1913, Rochet joined Red Star, with whom he played for three years, until 1916, when he was sent to the front, having previously served in the auxiliary services in Paris. In February 1916, he started for the LFA team in a friendly against foreigners.

== Death ==
Rochet died in Asnières on 29 September 1929, at the age of 40.
