= Parathlibops =

Scientific classification
- Kingdom: Animalia
- Phylum: Arthropoda
- Class: Insecta
- Order: Coleoptera
- Suborder: Adephaga
- Family: Carabidae
- Subfamily: Scaritinae
- Genus: Parathlibops; Basilewsky, 1958

Genus of beetles

Parathlibops is a genus of beetles in the family Carabidae, containing the following species:

- Parathlibops abbreviatus (K. B. M. J. Heller, 1923)
- Parathlibops abramovi Fedorenko, 2016
- Parathlibops alveolatus Fedorenko, 2016
- Parathlibops bakukong Bulirsch & Anichtchenko, 2018
- Parathlibops bulirschi Fedorenko, 2016
- Parathlibops cavipennis Fedorenko, 2016
- Parathlibops crenatus (Chaudoir, 1863)
- Parathlibops cylindronotus Fedorenko, 2016
- Parathlibops dohrni (Chaudoir, 1863)
- Parathlibops filiformis (Andrewes, 1929)
- Parathlibops glaber (Andrewes, 1929)
- Parathlibops inexpectatus Bulirsch & Anichtchenko, 2018
- Parathlibops integricollis (K. B. M. J. Heller, 1916)
- Parathlibops intermedius (K. B. M. J. Heller, 1921)
- Parathlibops minor (K. B. M. J. Heller, 1916)
- Parathlibops nepalensis Fedorenko, 2016
- Parathlibops omega (K. B. M. J. Heller, 1899)
- Parathlibops panayensis Bulirsch & Anichtchenko, 2018
- Parathlibops paviei (Lesne, 1896)
- Parathlibops puncticollis (Gestro, 1883)
- Parathlibops punctipennis Fedorenko, 2016
- Parathlibops wittmeri Casale, 1980
