= Rugiluclivina alutacea =

Scientific classification
- Domain: Eukaryota
- Kingdom: Animalia
- Phylum: Arthropoda
- Class: Insecta
- Order: Coleoptera
- Suborder: Adephaga
- Family: Carabidae
- Tribe: Clivinini
- Subtribe: Clivinina
- Genus: Rugiluclivina
- Species: R. alutacea

Binomial name
- Rugiluclivina alutacea (Lesne, 1896)

Synonyms
- Clivina alutacea Lesne, 1896

Species of beetle

Rugiluclivina alutacea is a species of ground beetle in the family Carabidae, found in China and Southeast Asia. It was formerly a member of the Clivina genus.
