= Mathieu de la Drôme =

19th century French member of parliament and meteorologist

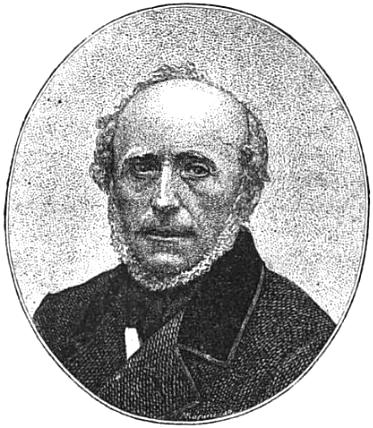
- Mathieu de la Drôme near the end of his life in 1863.

Deputy
- In office 1830–1851
- President: Napoleon III 1848–1851
- Prime Minister: Adolphe Thiers 1836
- Monarch: Louis-Philippe d'Orléans 1830–1848

Personal details
- Born: Philippe Antoine Mathieu; 7 June 1808 Saint-Christophe-et-le-Laris
- Died: 16 March 1865 Romans-sur-Isère
- Occupation: Politician

Philippe Antoine Mathieu (7 June 1808 – 16 March 1865), commonly referred to as Mathieu de la Drôme, was a French politician and intellectual active in the 1830s and 1840s.

== Life ==
Philippe Antoine Mathie is the son of Joseph Mathieu, a farmer, and his spouse, Rose Brun.His brother was Joseph-Romain Mathieu, who was a writer and grammarian.

Mathieu studied at the seminary of Valence. Then he moved to Lyon and started a private course, where he gave literary and scientific conferences. He played a part in the July Revolution in 1830. In 1846, he left Lyon for Romans-sur-Isère where he set up an Athenaeum, a type of library or place of higher-thinking called the Athenaeum of Fine Letters.

== Political Trajectory ==
In the year 1840, he engaged himself in political action, participated in reformist banquets, expressed favor in lowering the wealth criteria for voting. He played a key role in the adoption of male universal suffrage in France. However his activism worried the authorities, the Athenaeum, where he gave his economic and political course, was removed.

He was a modernized reformist, who saw the July Monarchy as a means of political and social emancipation, and while he himself did not believe that a monarchy was the best solution for French governance he accepted the liberal monarchy, unlike other republicans in his day. In 1847 he started a monthly journal titled "The Voice of One Man" (fr: La Voix d'un solitaire) Along with The Courier of the Gold Coast (fr: Le Courier de la Côte d'Or) by Pierre Joigneaux it was one of the dominant republican editorial productions under the July Monarchy in France.

Mathieu welcomed the springtime of the peoples with enthusiasm. As head of the republicans, he was elected to the National Constituent Assembly on 23 April, and it was then that he was first called "Mathieu de la Drôme" rather than "Philippe Antoine Mathieu". He was a member of the extreme left and at that time he attempted to include "The Right to Work" in the preamble to the French Constitution. In November 1848, he participated in the Solidarité Républicaine, a political association during the French Second Republic. He worked alongside Ledru-Rollin and Delescluze. He was reëlected to the electoral assembly in May 1848; he was opposed to Louis-Napoleon. In 1850 he was a lead figure in the Lyon Plot, an attempt to coup Louis-Napoleon; he faced no charges in the trial the following year. When Louis-Napoleon launched his own coup, Mathieu was exiled to Belgium, but he returned to France in the summer of 1852.

== Meteorology ==
Under the Second Empire, Mathieu de la Drôme began to focus on scientific works rather than his political career. In 1862 he published a work on the prediction of temperature and lunar phases titled On the Prediction of Temperature (fr:De la prédiction du temps, 1862). In which he addresses a number of predictions in a journal at the French Academy of Sciences.

In 1864 Mathieu published the first in a series of annual almanacs, each included predictions on weather patterns and temperatures for the following year. While Mathieu died shortly into the publication's history, his son-in-law, Louis Neyret continued it beginning in 1863, his son also continued it after Neyret's death, allowing the almanac to continue until 1939, when it ceased due to the Second World War.
