= Ruffey-lès-Beaune =

- Commune
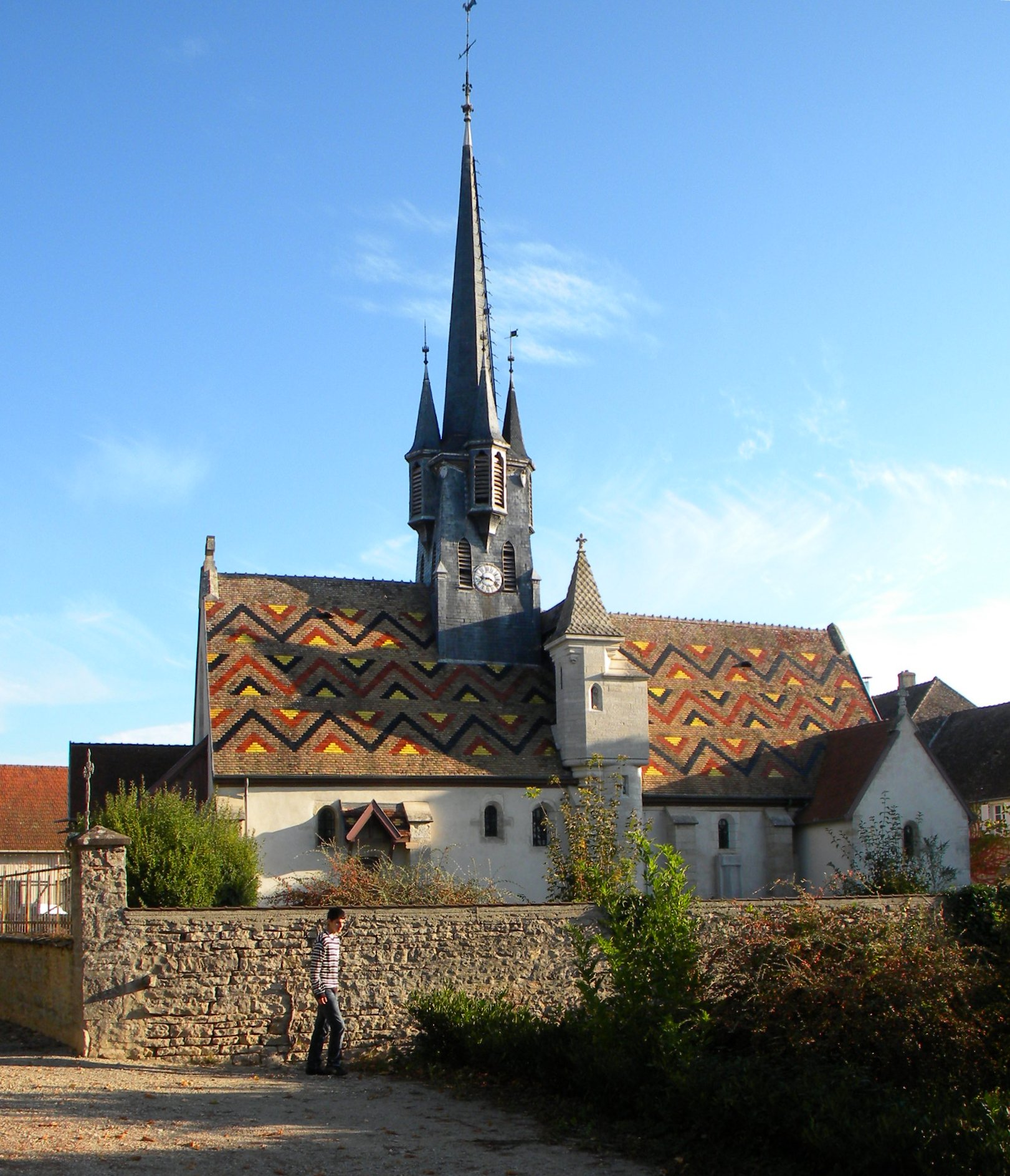
- The church in Ruffey-lès-Beaune

- Coat of arms
- Location of Ruffey-lès-Beaune
- Location within France Location within Bourgogne-Franche-Comté
- Coordinates: 47°01′11″N 4°54′53″E
- Country: France
- Region: Bourgogne-Franche-Comté
- Department: Côte-d'Or
- Arrondissement: Beaune
- Canton: Ladoix-Serrigny
- Intercommunality: CA Beaune Côte et Sud

Government
  - Mayor (2020–2026): Gérard Greffe
- Area^{1}: 15.44 km^{2} (5.96 sq mi)
- Highest elevation: 218 m (715 ft)
- Lowest elevation: 184 m (604 ft)
- Population (2023): 740
  - Density: 48/km^{2} (120/sq mi)
- Time zone: UTC+01:00 (CET)
  - Summer (DST): UTC+02:00 (CEST)
- INSEE/Postal code: 21534 /21200
- ^{1} French Land Register data, which excludes lakes, ponds, glaciers > 1 km^{2} (0.386 sq mi or 247 acres) and river estuaries.

Ruffey-lès-Beaune (French pronunciation: [ʁyfɛ lɛ bon], literally Ruffey near Beaune) is a commune in the Côte-d'Or department in eastern France.

== Population ==
Historical population
Year	Pop.	±% p.a.
1968	415	—
1975	389	−0.92%
1982	519	+4.20%
1990	622	+2.29%
1999	658	+0.63%
2007	677	+0.36%
2012	702	+0.73%
2017	714	+0.34%
2023	740	+0.60%
Source: INSEE

== See also ==
- Communes of the Côte-d'Or department
