= Saint-Rémy, Côte-d'Or =

Saint-Rémy
- Commune
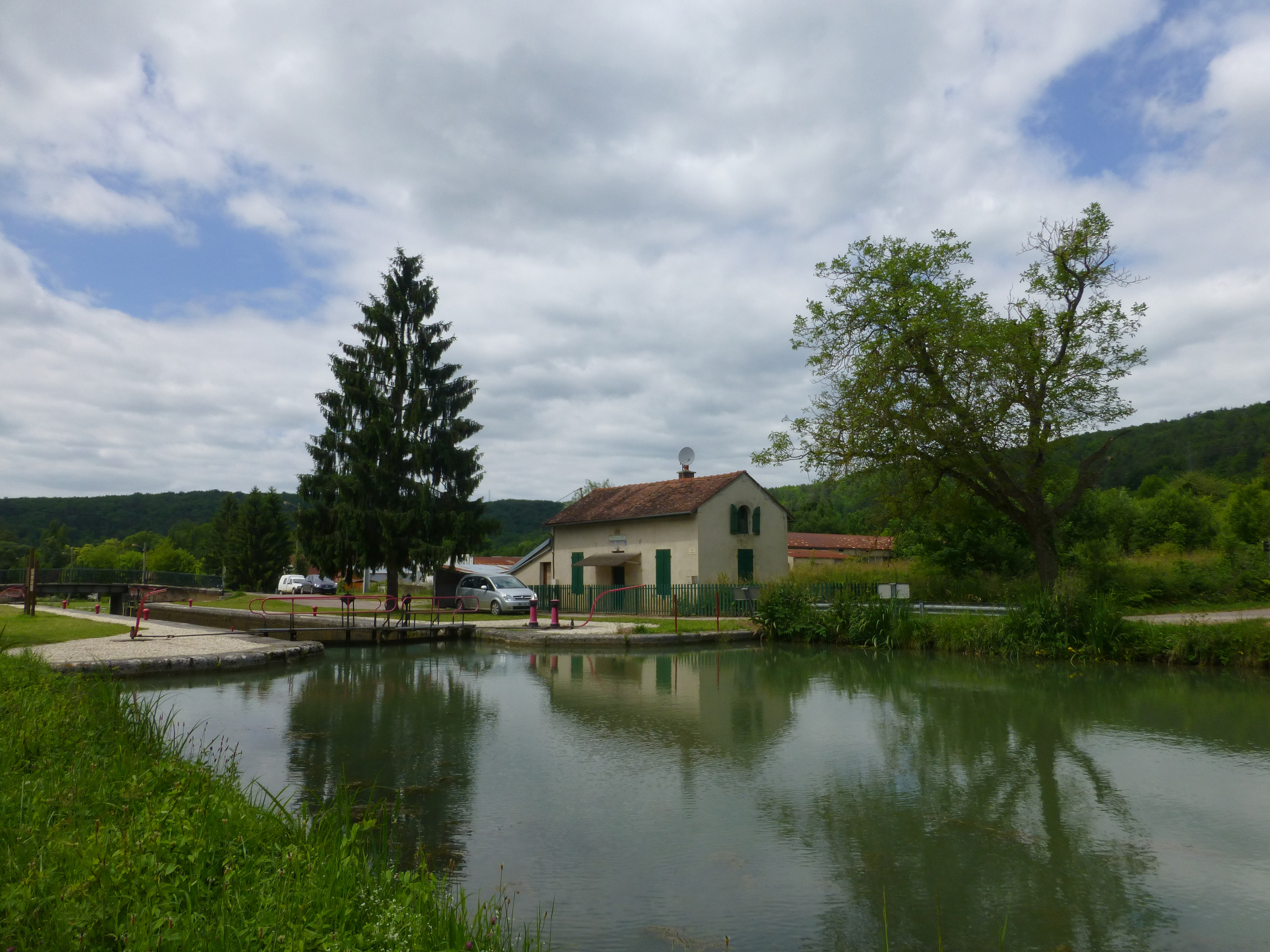
- The Saint-Rémy lock on the Bourgogne Canal

- Coat of arms
- Location of Saint-Rémy
- Location within France Location within Bourgogne-Franche-Comté
- Coordinates: 47°38′15″N 4°17′55″E
- Country: France
- Region: Bourgogne-Franche-Comté
- Department: Côte-d'Or
- Arrondissement: Montbard
- Canton: Montbard

Government
  - Mayor (2020–2026): Yves Bilbot
- Area^{1}: 13.82 km^{2} (5.34 sq mi)
- Elevation: 220 m (720 ft)
- Highest elevation: 346 m (1,135 ft)
- Lowest elevation: 201 m (659 ft)
- Population (2023): 673
  - Density: 48.7/km^{2} (126/sq mi)
- Time zone: UTC+01:00 (CET)
  - Summer (DST): UTC+02:00 (CEST)
- INSEE/Postal code: 21568 /21500
- ^{1} French Land Register data, which excludes lakes, ponds, glaciers > 1 km^{2} (0.386 sq mi or 247 acres) and river estuaries.

Saint-Rémy (French pronunciation: [sɛ̃ ʁemi]) is a commune in the Côte-d'Or department in eastern France.

== Population ==
Historical population
Year	Pop.	±% p.a.
1968	841	—
1975	766	−1.33%
1982	883	+2.05%
1990	884	+0.01%
1999	814	−0.91%
2007	811	−0.05%
2012	770	−1.03%
2017	702	−1.83%
2023	673	−0.70%
Source: INSEE

== See also ==
- Communes of the Côte-d'Or department
