= Asnières =

Asnières may refer to:

== Communes in France ==
- Asnières, Eure, in the Eure département
- Asnières-en-Bessin, in the Calvados département
- Asnières-en-Montagne, in the Côte-d'Or département
- Asnières-en-Poitou, in the Deux-Sèvres département
- Asnières-la-Giraud, in the Charente-Maritime département
- Asnières-lès-Dijon, in the Côte-d'Or département
- Asnières-sous-Bois, in the Yonne département
- Asnières-sur-Blour, in the Vienne département
- Asnières-sur-Nouère, in the Charente département
- Asnières-sur-Oise, in the Val-d'Oise département
- Asnières-sur-Saône, in the Ain département
- Asnières-sur-Seine, in the Hauts-de-Seine département
- Asnières-sur-Vègre, in the Sarthe département

== Other ==
- Porte d'Asnières, one of the city gates of Paris
- Asnières (Van Gogh series), paintings by Vincent van Gogh
