= Asnières-en-Montagne =

- Commune
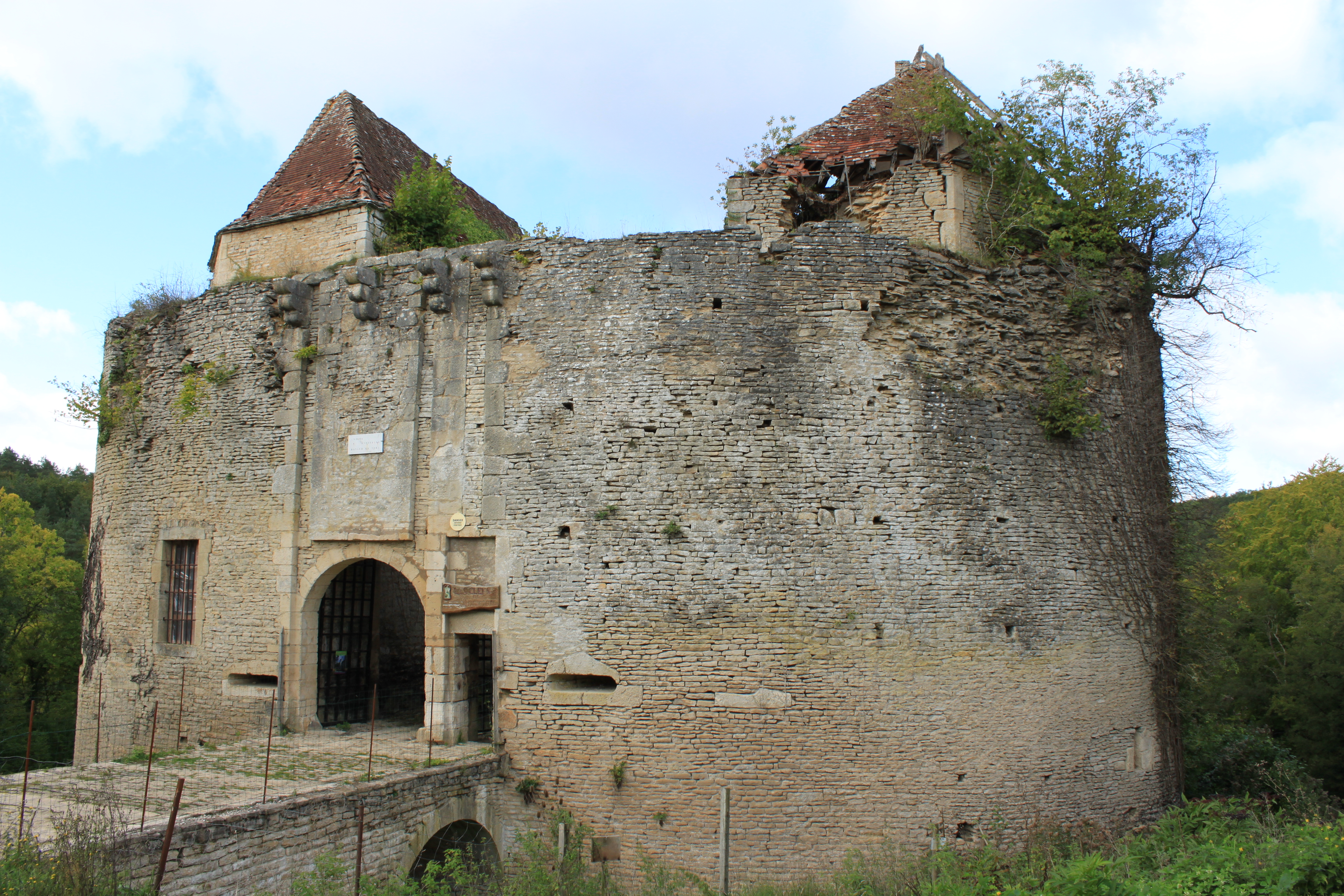
- The chateau of Rochefort

- Coat of arms
- Location of Asnières-en-Montagne
- Location within France Location within Bourgogne-Franche-Comté
- Coordinates: 47°43′09″N 4°16′32″E
- Country: France
- Region: Bourgogne-Franche-Comté
- Department: Côte-d'Or
- Arrondissement: Montbard
- Canton: Montbard
- Intercommunality: CC Montbardois

Government
  - Mayor (2020–2026): Carine Petry
- Area^{1}: 28.47 km^{2} (10.99 sq mi)
- Elevation: 288 m (945 ft)
- Highest elevation: 322 m (1,056 ft)
- Lowest elevation: 203 m (666 ft)
- Population (2023): 160
  - Density: 5.6/km^{2} (15/sq mi)
- Time zone: UTC+01:00 (CET)
  - Summer (DST): UTC+02:00 (CEST)
- INSEE/Postal code: 21026 /21500
- ^{1} French Land Register data, which excludes lakes, ponds, glaciers > 1 km^{2} (0.386 sq mi or 247 acres) and river estuaries.

Asnières-en-Montagne (French pronunciation: [ɑnjɛʁ ɑ̃ mɔ̃taɲ]) is a commune in the Côte-d'Or department in the Bourgogne-Franche-Comté region of eastern France.

== Geography ==
Asnières-en-Montagne is located some 25 km south-east of Tonnerre and 10 km north by north-west of Montbard. The western and northern borders of the commune are the boundaries between the departments of Côte-d'Or and Yonne. Access to the commune is by the D5 road from Montbard in the south passing through the east of the commune and continuing to Laignes in the north-east. Access to the village is by the D119 road from Ravières in the west passing through the village and continuing south-east to join the D5 near the commune border. The D5D also links the D5 at the northern border to the village then continues south-west to join the D905 between Perrigny-sur-Armançon and Nuits. The commune is almost surrounded on all sides by forests which cover about 60% of its area with the central area of the commune farmland.

== Administration ==
List of Successive Mayors

From	To	Name
2001	2014	Georges Gouot
2014	2026	Carine Petry

== Demography ==
The inhabitants of the commune are known as Asniérois or Asniéroises in French.

Historical population

Year	Pop.	±% p.a.
1793	455	—
1821	439	−0.13%
1846	450	+0.10%
1872	371	−0.74%
1901	283	−0.93%
1926	238	−0.69%
1946	243	+0.10%
1962	237	−0.16%
1968	214	−1.69%

Year	Pop.	±% p.a.
1975	175	−2.83%
1982	185	+0.80%
1990	180	−0.34%
1999	187	+0.42%
2007	180	−0.48%
2012	188	+0.87%
2017	191	+0.32%
2023	160	−2.91%

Source: EHESS and INSEE

== Culture and heritage ==
=== Civil heritage ===
- The Chateau de Rochefort (16th century), the ruins of the chateau were restored by Les Clefs de Rochefort. together with the REMPART Union.

Chateau de Rochefort Gallery

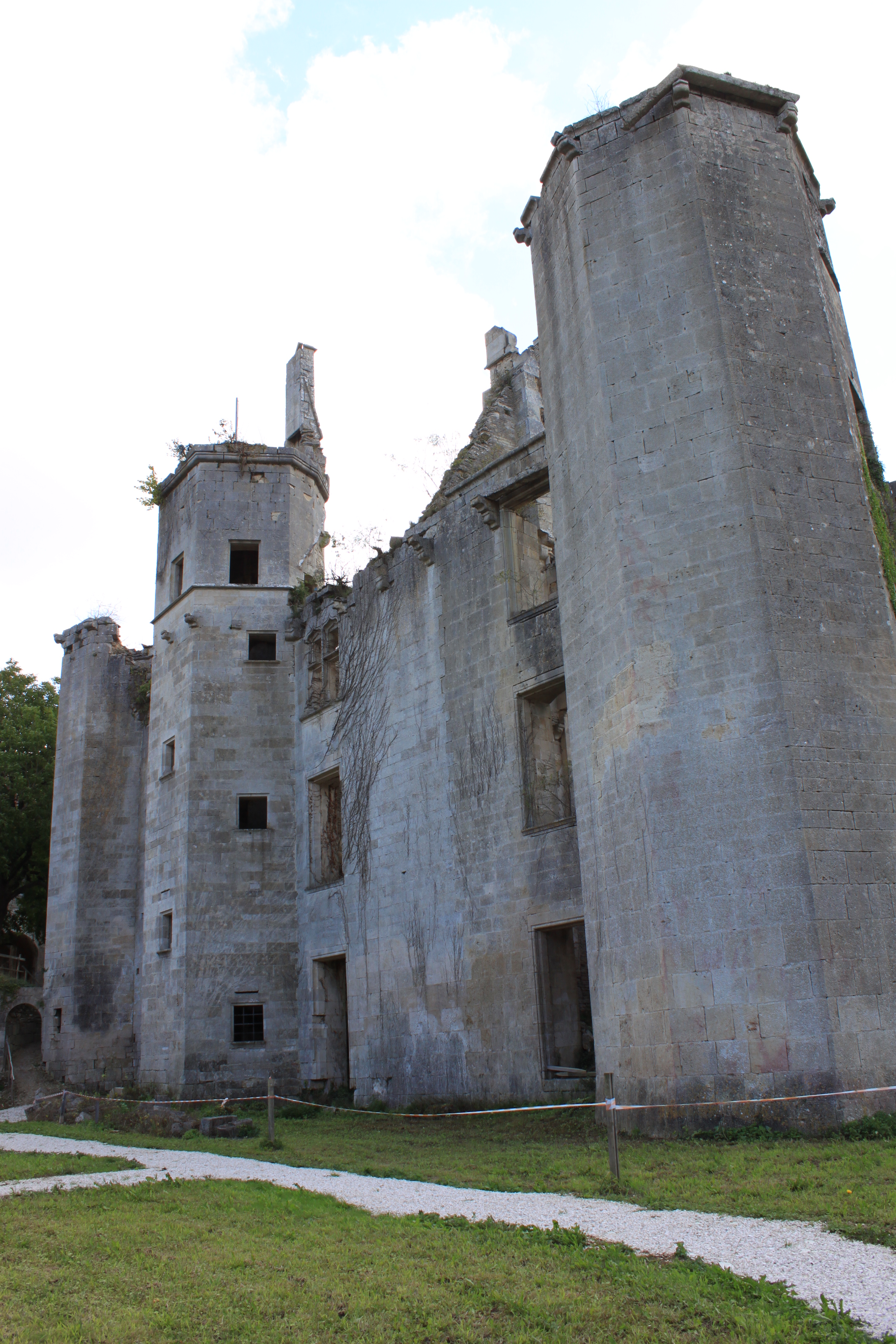

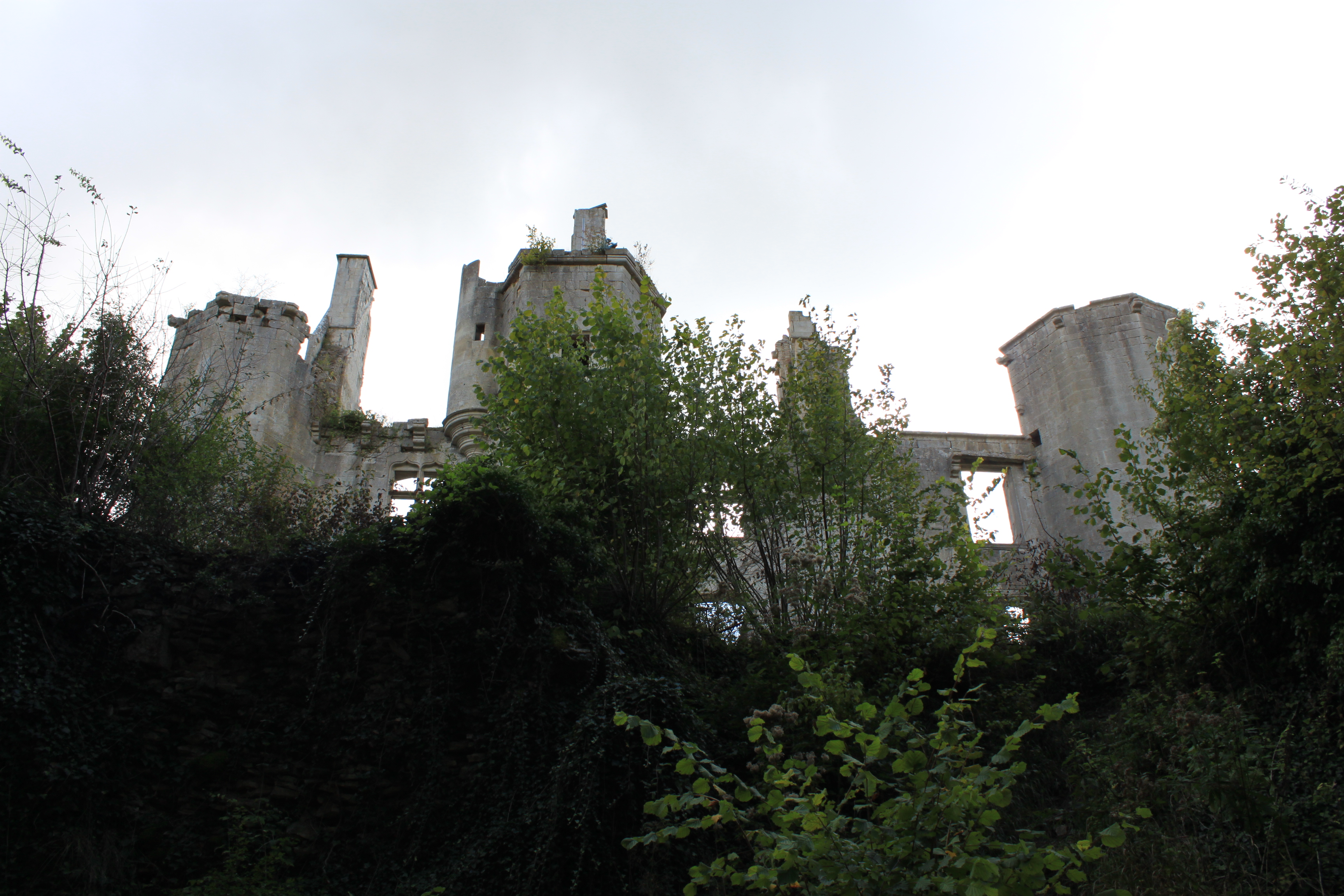

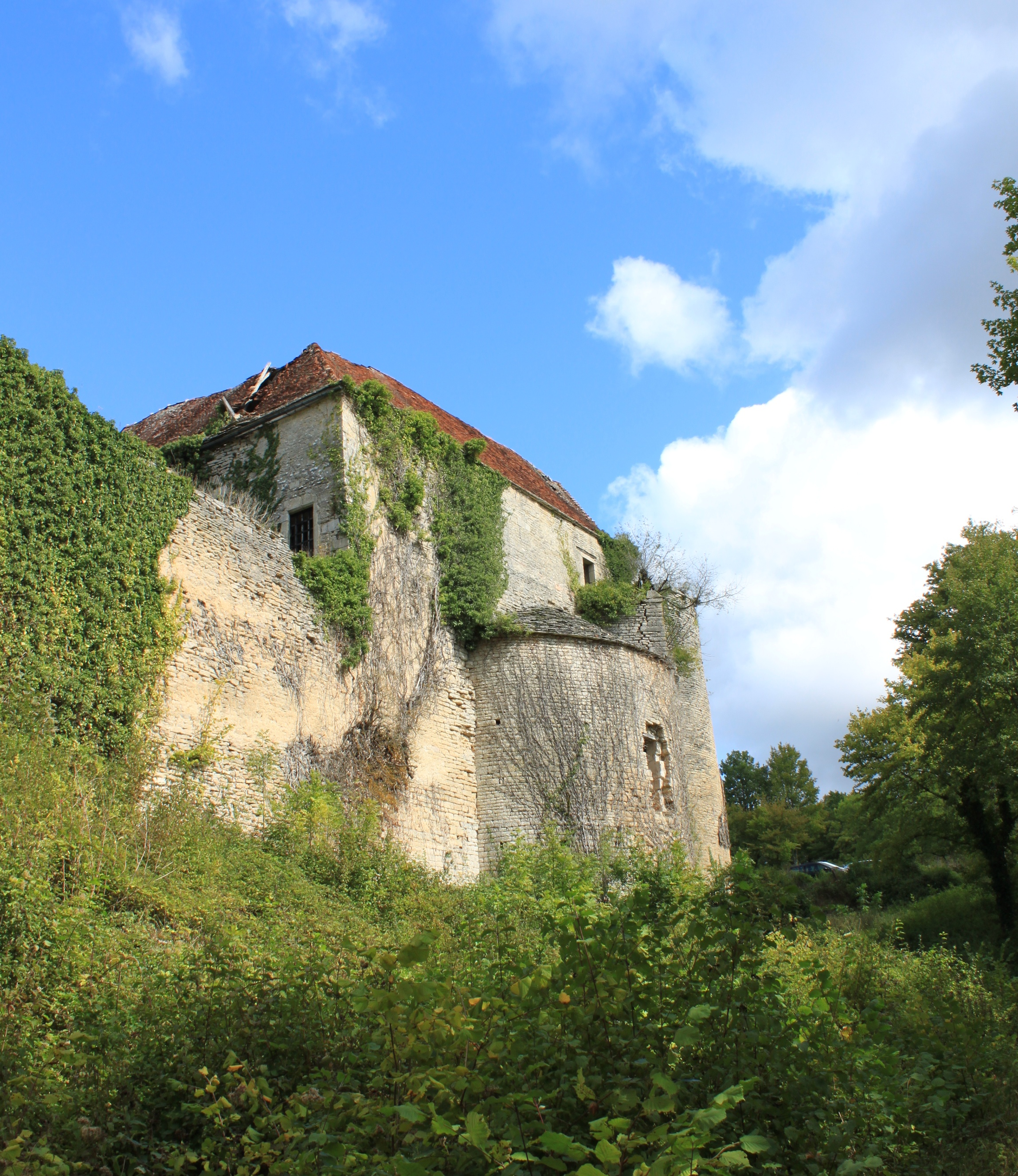

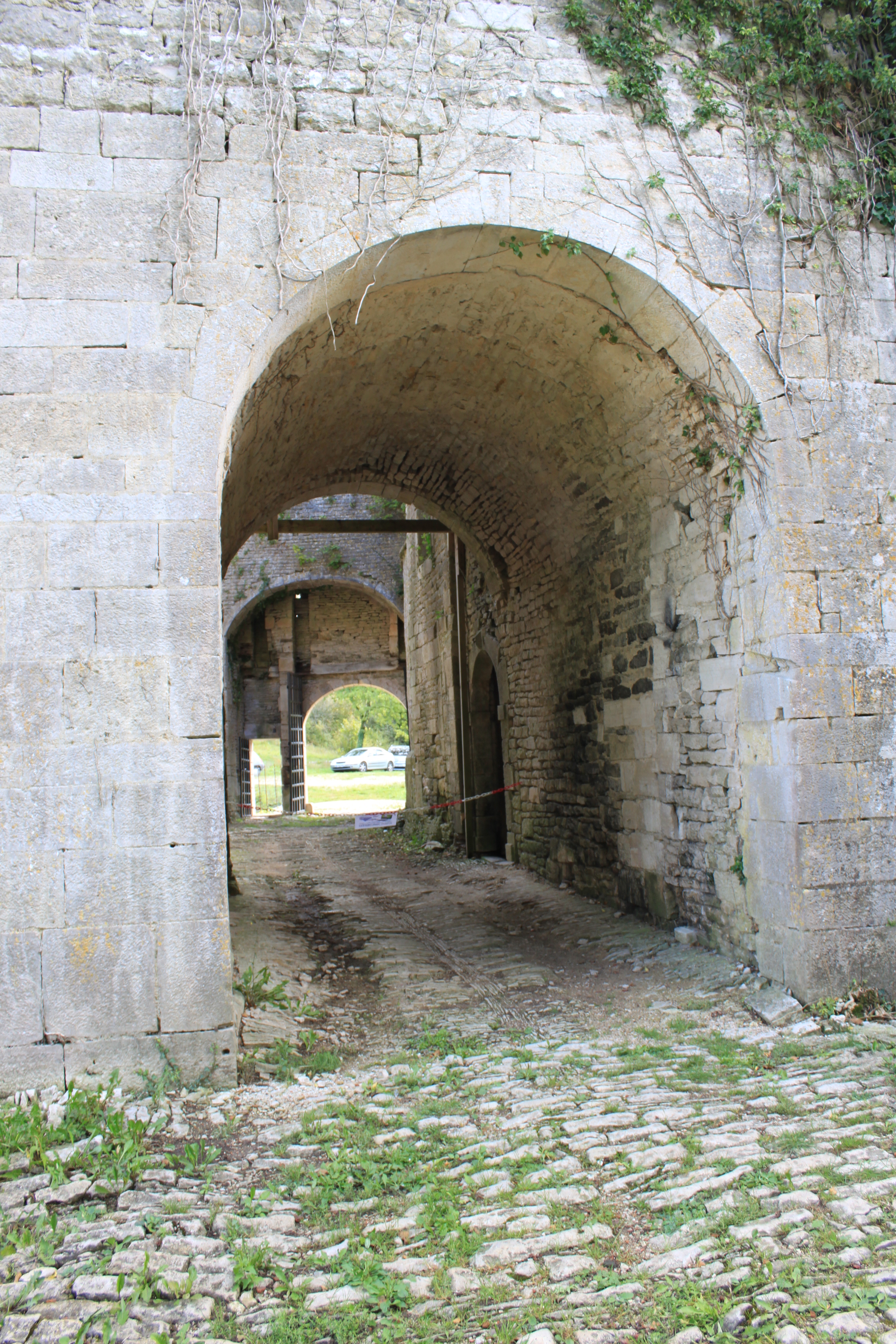

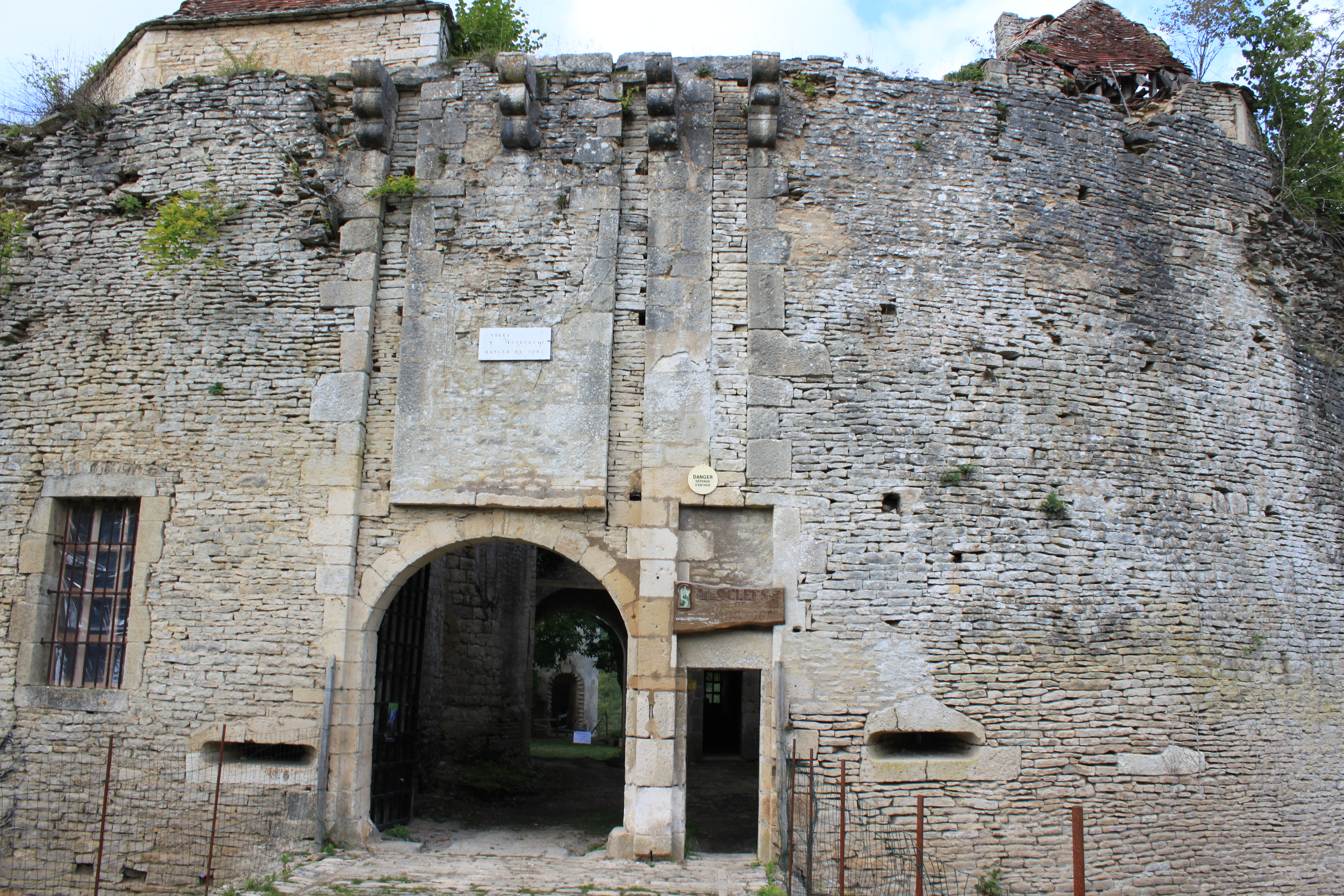

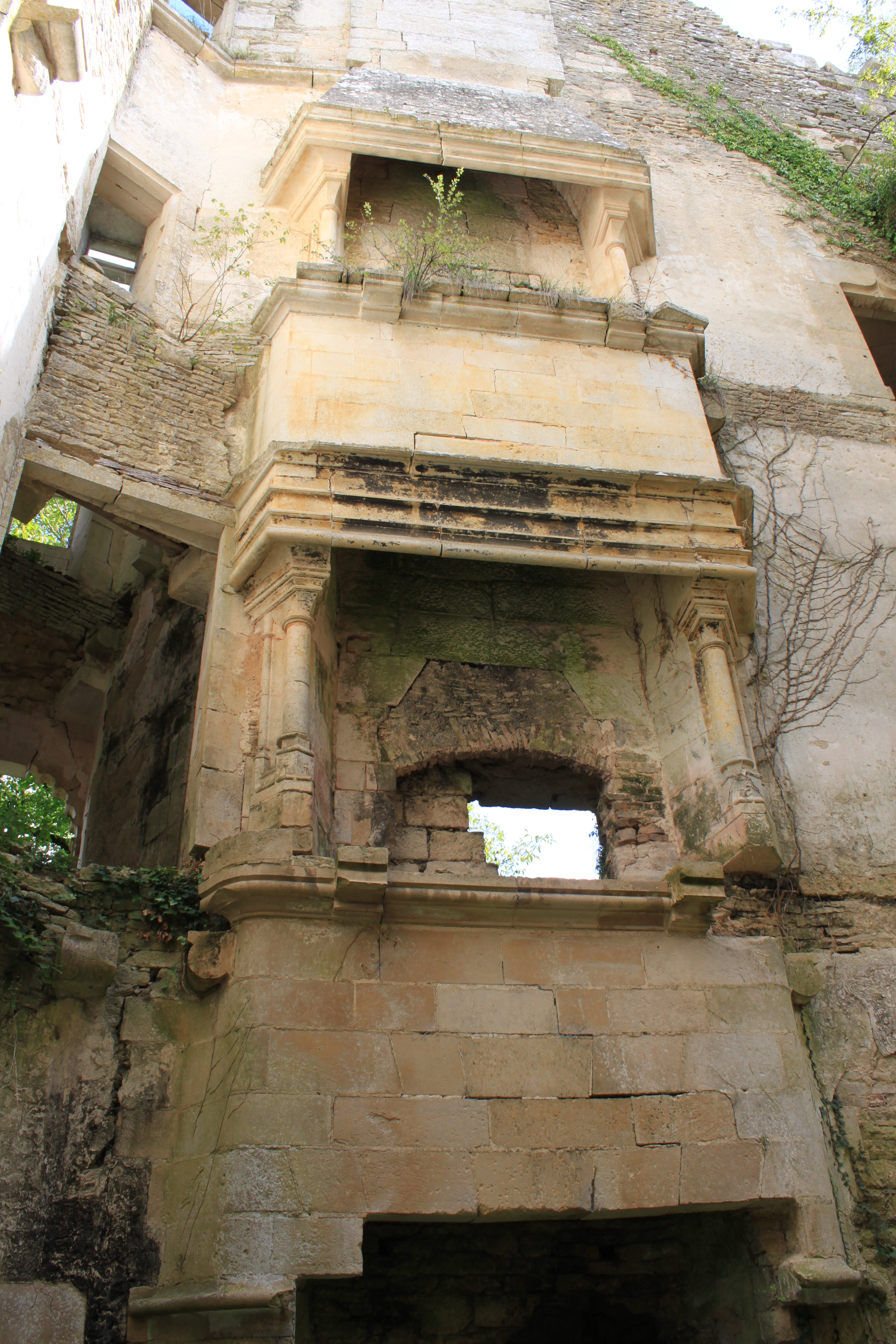

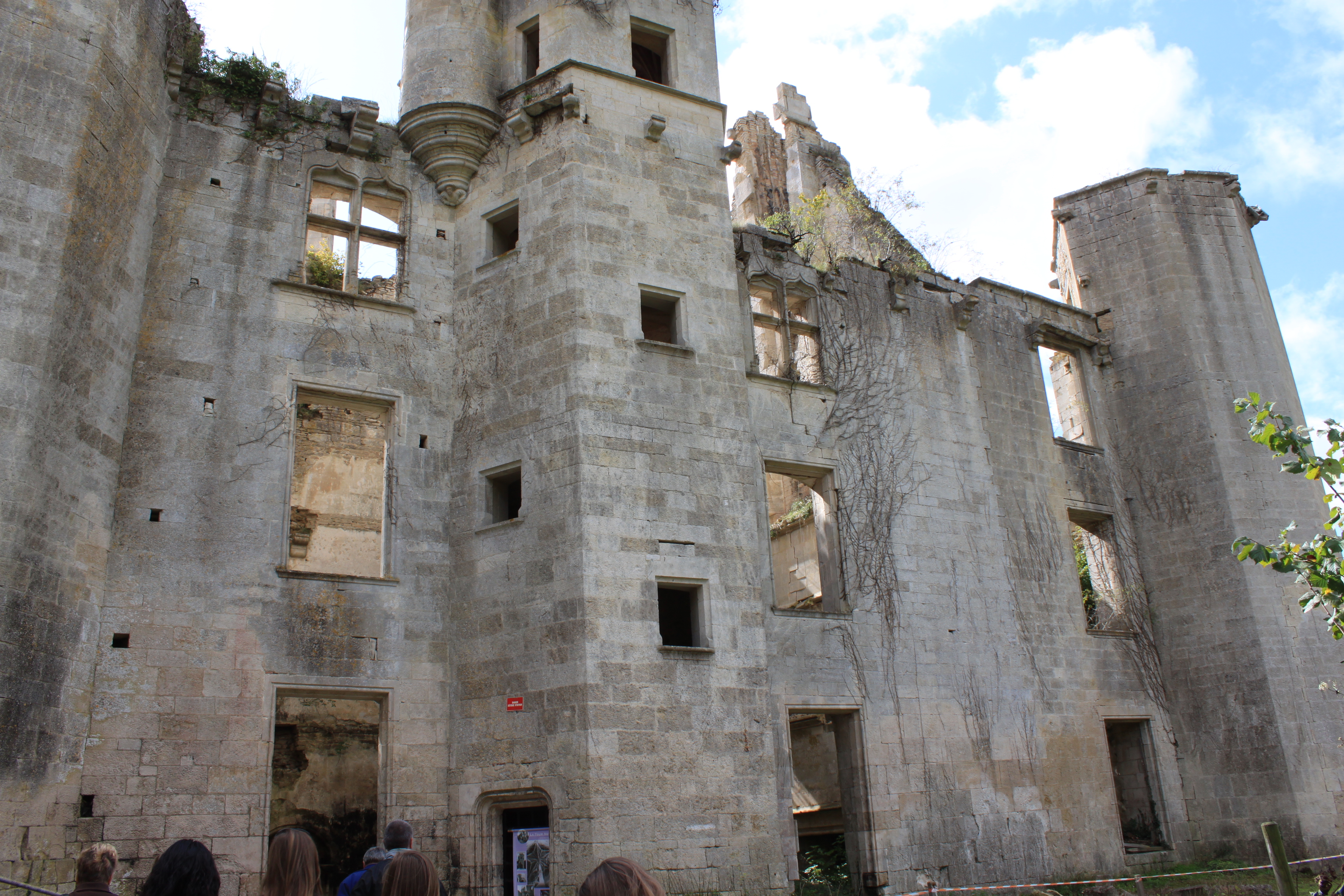

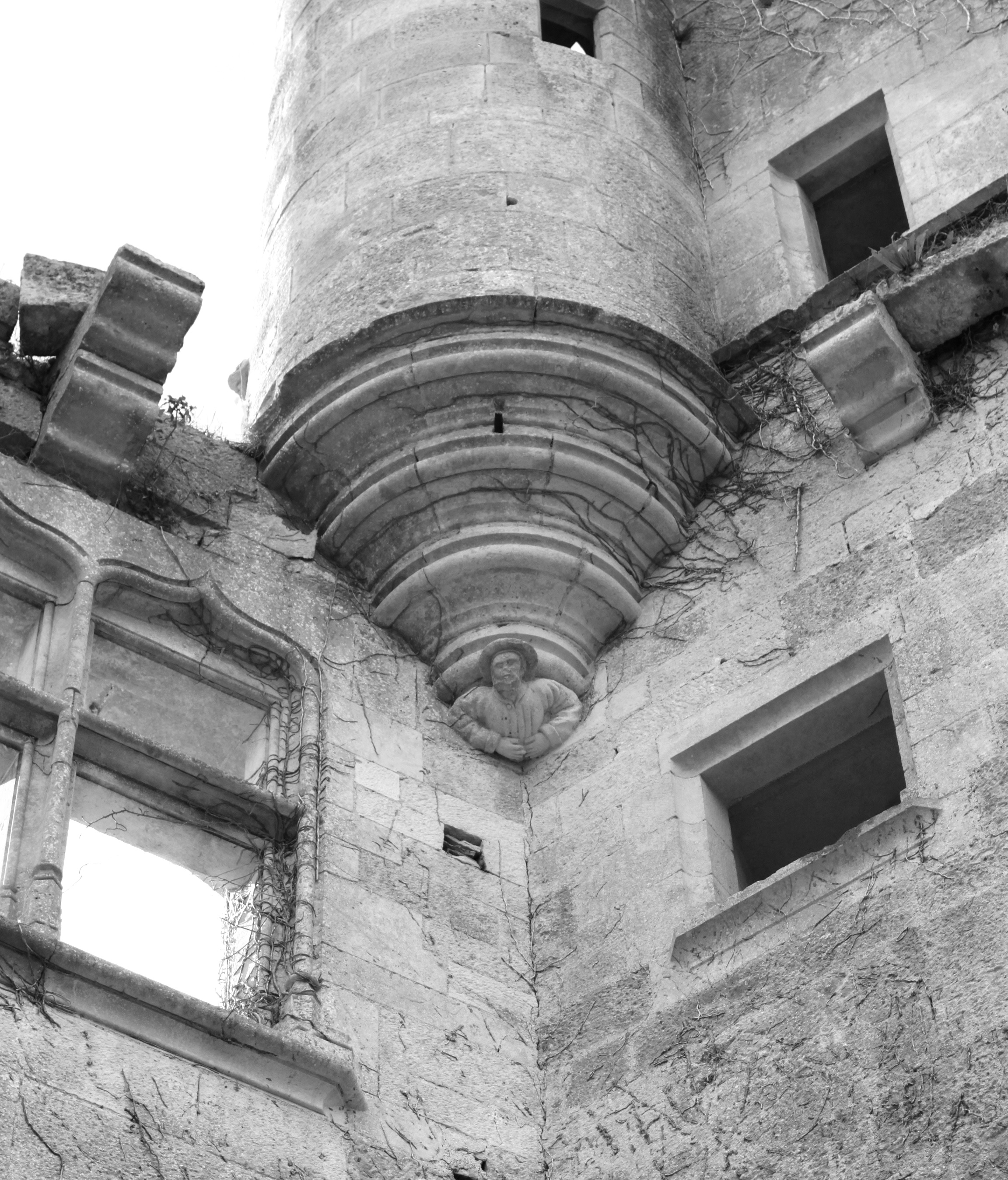

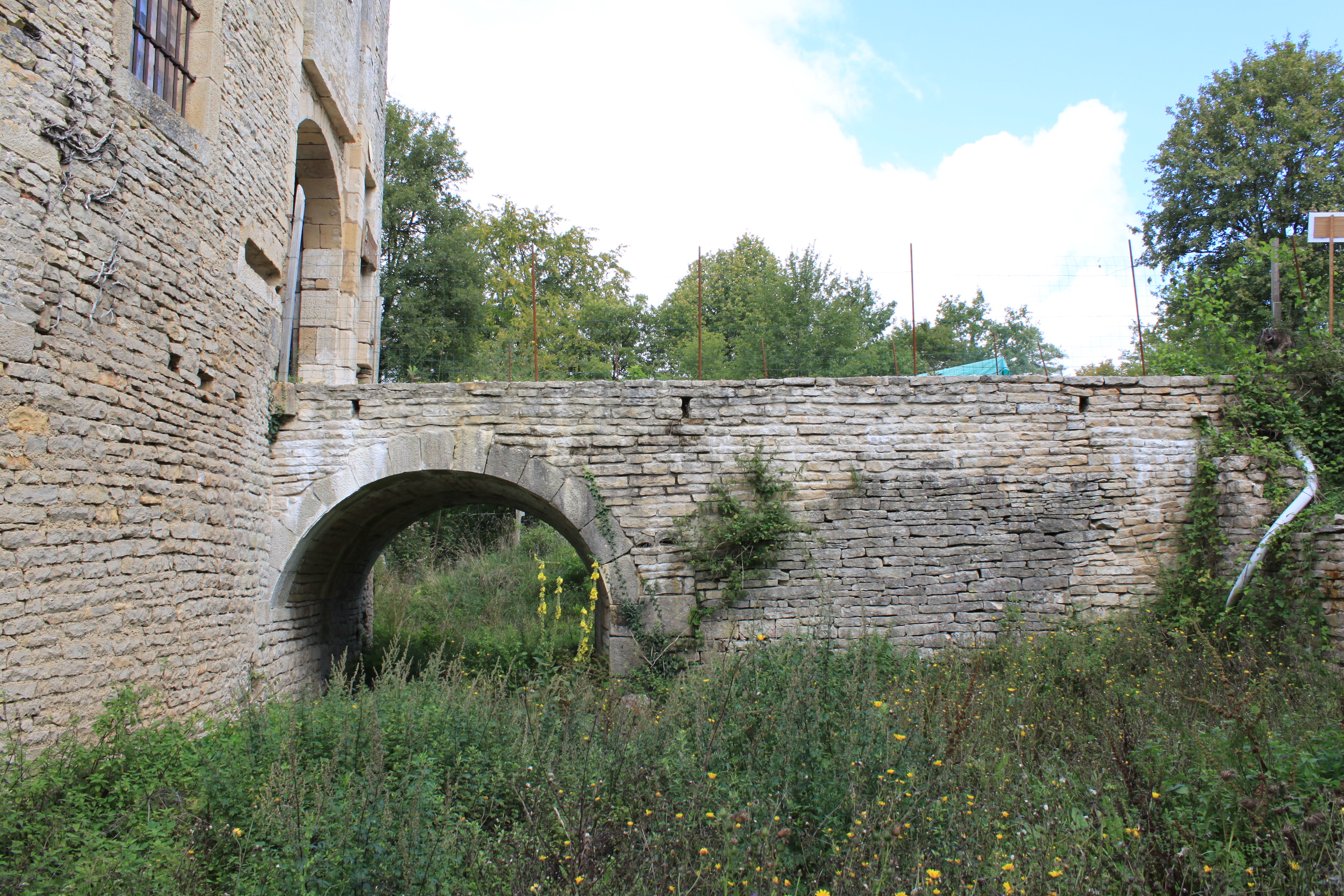

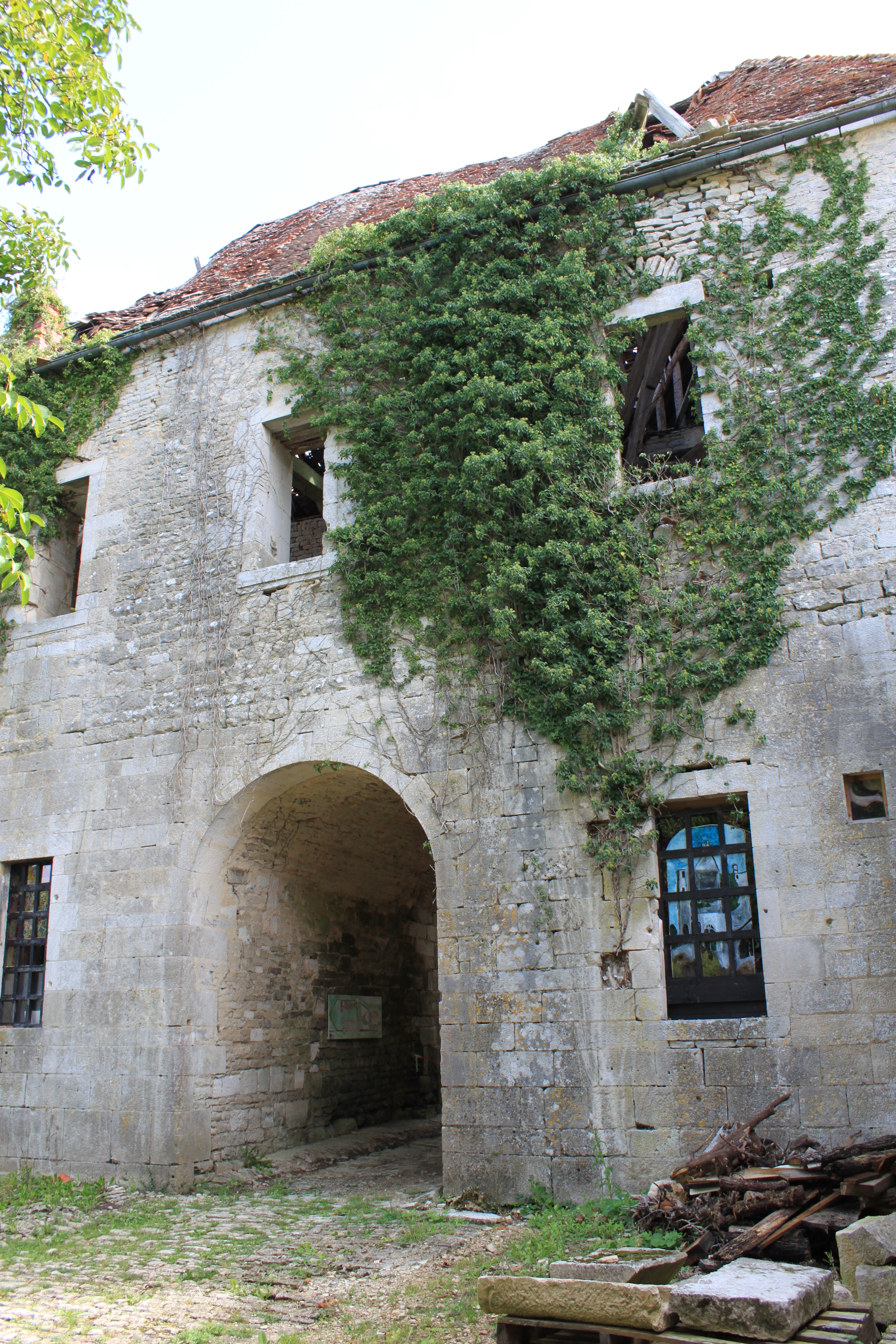

=== Religious heritage ===
Two religious structures are registered as historical monuments. These are:

- Parish Church of Saint Pierre (14th century)
- Cemetery Cross (16th century)

The church contains several items that are registered as historical objects. These are:

- Cemetery Cross (17th century)
- Statue: Christ on the cross (17th century)
- Statue: Saint Mammès (16th century)
- Statue: Saint Roch (16th century)
- Statue: Saint Sebastian (16th century)
- Statue: Saint Barbe (16th century)
- Statue: Saint Antoine (16th century)
- Statue: Saint Jean-Baptiste (15th century)
- Statue: Saint Jean de Réome (15th century)
- Statue: Saint Pierre (15th century)
- Statue: Virgin of mercy (15th century)
- Statue: Virgin of pity (15th century)
- Statue: Virgin and child (15th century)

== Notable people linked to the commune ==
- Guy de Rochefort
- Pierre Clairambault (1651-1740), Genealogist

== See also ==
- Communes of the Côte-d'Or department
