= Pierre Lesne =

French entomologist (1871–1949)

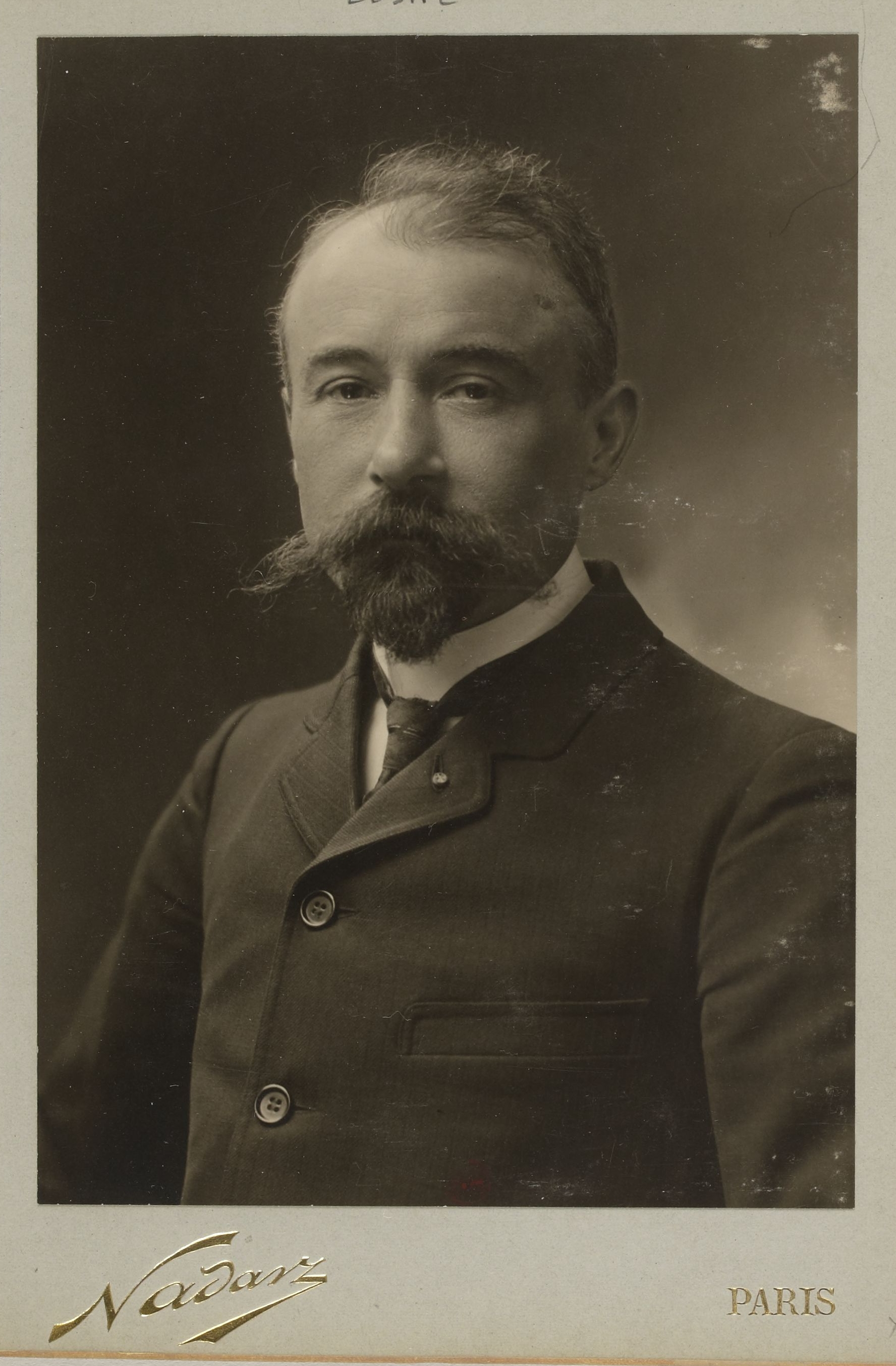

Pierre Lesne (9 April 1871 – 10 November 1949) was a French entomologist who specialized in the beetles, particularly the wood boring beetles of the family Bostrychidae. He also took an interest in parasitic Hymenoptera. The term "phoresy" was introduced by Lesne. He worked at the Museum of Natural History, Paris.

== Life and work ==
Lesne was born in Landrecies, Nord. His grandfather Pierre Joigneaux was an agronomist from the Côte-d'Or. He went to study at Collège Chaptal, and spent time with the insect collections at the museum where he met Émile Blanchard, then a blind teacher who needed his hand to be guided on a poster by a preparator while he gave his classes. He also was influenced by Hippolyte Lucas, E.-L. Bouvier, and Charles Brongniart. Lesne introduced the word "phoresy" in 1896. Lesne collected in Algeria and on the Canary Islands. In 1928-29 he collected in Mozambique, then a Portuguese colony. He published more than 240 papers. In 1931 he became a deputy director having lost the position of director to René Jeannel, and was in the position until his retirement.
