= Aubaine, Côte-d'Or =

Aubaine
- Commune
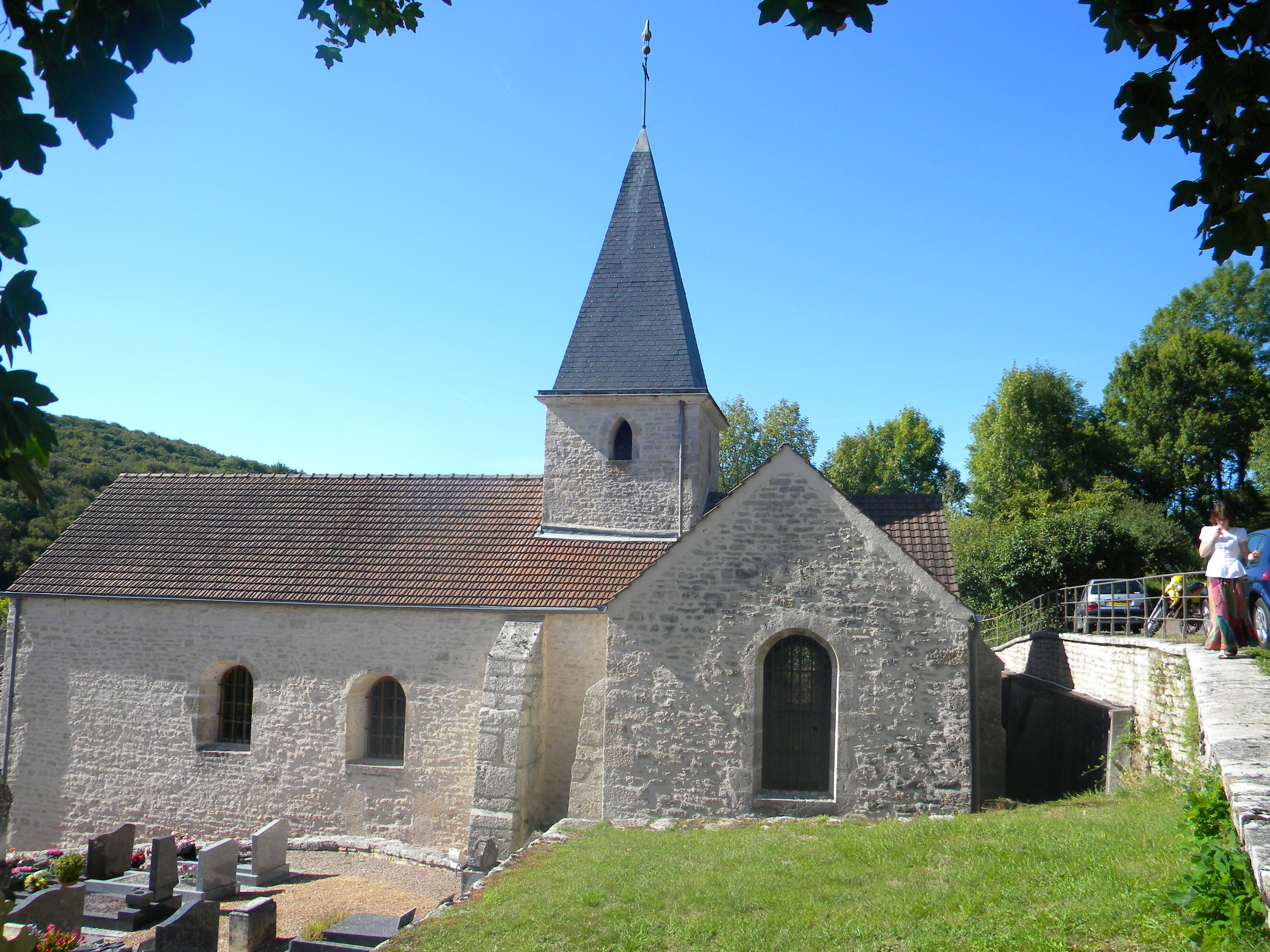
- The church in Aubaine

- Coat of arms
- Location of Aubaine
- Location within France Location within Bourgogne-Franche-Comté
- Coordinates: 47°08′16″N 4°43′06″E
- Country: France
- Region: Bourgogne-Franche-Comté
- Department: Côte-d'Or
- Arrondissement: Beaune
- Canton: Arnay-le-Duc
- Intercommunality: CC Pouilly-en-Auxois Bligny-sur-Ouche

Government
  - Mayor (2020–2026): Monique Febvre
- Area^{1}: 16.21 km^{2} (6.26 sq mi)
- Elevation: 611 m (2,005 ft)
- Highest elevation: 611 m (2,005 ft)
- Lowest elevation: 380 m (1,250 ft)
- Population (2023): 89
  - Density: 5.5/km^{2} (14/sq mi)
- Time zone: UTC+01:00 (CET)
  - Summer (DST): UTC+02:00 (CEST)
- INSEE/Postal code: 21030 /21360
- ^{1} French Land Register data, which excludes lakes, ponds, glaciers > 1 km^{2} (0.386 sq mi or 247 acres) and river estuaries.

Aubaine (French pronunciation: [obɛn]) is a commune in the Côte-d'Or department in the Bourgogne-Franche-Comté region of eastern France.

== Geography ==
Aubaine is located some 17 km west of Nuits-Saint-Georges and 20 km north-west of Beaune. Access to the commune is by the D18 road from Crugey in the north-west passing through the north of the commune and continuing east then south to Beaune. The D104A road branches from the D18 west of the commune and goes south to the village then continues south to join the D970. The D104 comes from Bligny-sur-Ouche in the south-west passing through the south of the commune and going to Bouilland in the east. The A6 autoroute (E60) passes through the south of the commune but the nearest exit is Exit 24 near Beaune. Apart from the village there is the hamlet of Becoup in the north and Crépey in the south. The commune is mostly rugged and heavily forested but the north of the commune lies in the Ouche Valley and incorporates part of the hamlet of Pont-d'Ouche.

The Ouche river forms the northern border of the north-western extension of the commune and the Canal de Bourgogne passes through the north of this extension.

Crépey is at the intersection of roads from Aubaine, Beaune, and Arcenant and there was once a refreshment stall there.

== Toponymy ==
The name Aubaine has appeared in the following forms:

- Albania (1004)
- Aubeyne (1470)
- Albano,
- Aubaigne,
- Aubaingne,
- Aubainne.

Berthoud and Matruchot wrote that "The Albani theme is so transparent that it can not give rise to any doubt that it is the feminine of the man's name Albanius". Aubaine (villa) was literally the "domain of Albanius". L. Taverdet had a similar view: "Albania (villa) is an adjective formed on the name of the person Albanus". Father Bredault thought, to the contrary, that Aubaine came from the word Alb meaning "mountain".

The name Bécoup has appeared in the forms:

- Bivagum (696)
- Bouvacoum (878)
- Bescou (1290)
- Bescoul (1391) and
- Bivago.

The name Crépey has appeared in the forms:

- Crispeis (878)
- Crispiacus (1119)
- Crespee (19th century)

The Beaugey farm has appeared in the forms:

- Bouagez (1644)
- Beaugé (19th century).

== History ==
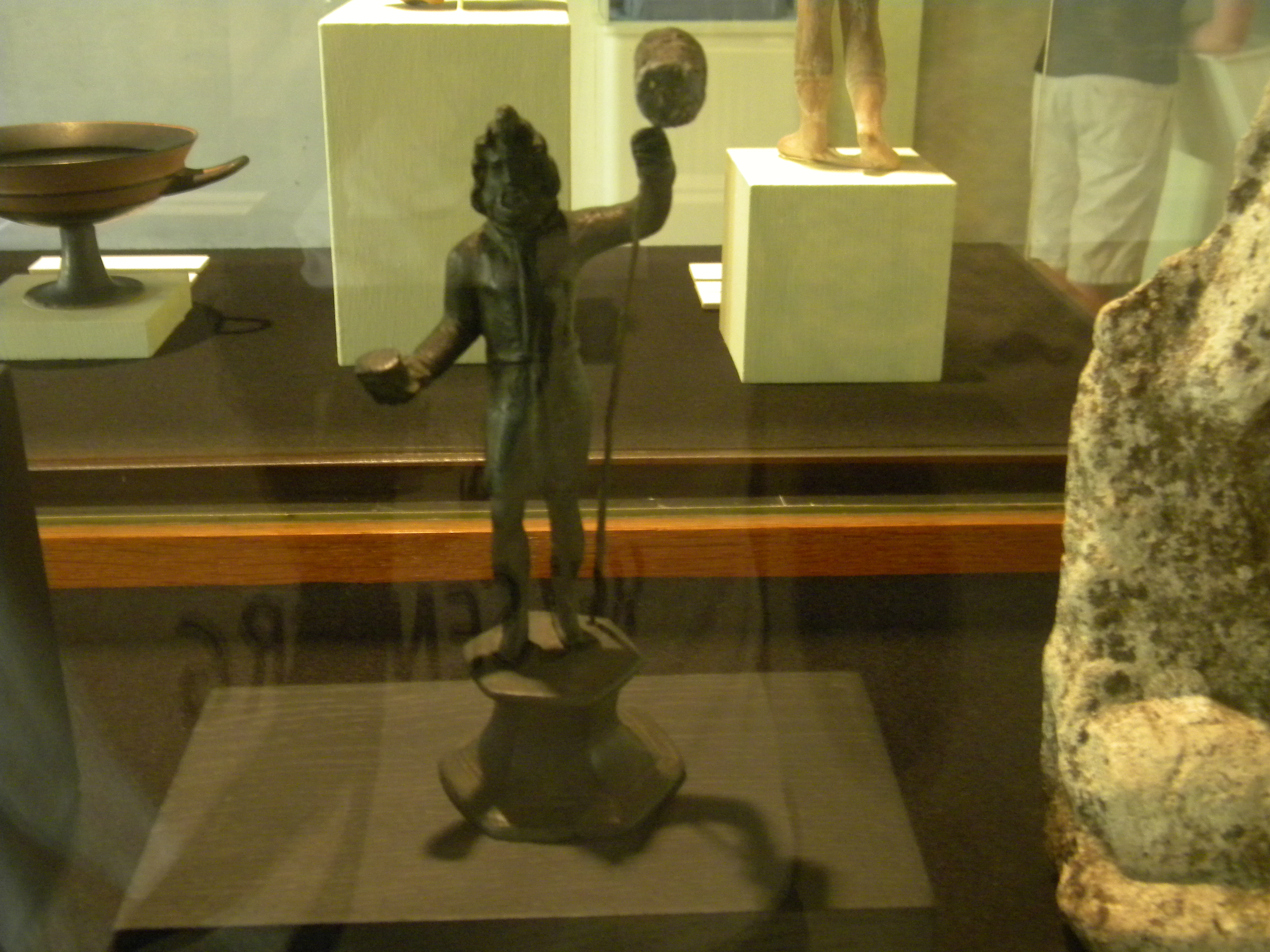
God with Mallet (2nd century)at the Wine Museum in Beaune

A bronze statuette of a god with a mallet was found in Crépey - a demonstration of the survival of Celtic polytheism in the Gallo-Roman era.

Around 1740, the priest at Aubaine responded to the engineer Antoine, who was developing a map of the province: "There is a tower with a very low spire. This is a simple lordship. It is located three leagues from Beaune to the south. The hamlets that dependent on my parish are: Bécoup to the north about a quarter of a league from my village, and Crespée located on top of a mountain between the east and the south. The village of Aubaine has in its immediate environment the wooded valleys of Aulne, Tilleul, Presme, and Oiseaux. At the bottom of the village is the source of the Saint-Quentin which releases water to join the Ouche at Pont-d'Ouche."

=== Heraldry ===
| Arms of Aubaine | Blazon: Party per fesse, at first party per pale: 1 of Argent, a cross pattée in Gules; 2 Azure, Semé-de-lis of Or with an inescutcheon bendy of Or and Azure bordure in Gules; at second Gules, a cross moline of Argent filled in with Sable. |

== Administration ==
List of Successive Mayors

| From | To | Name | Party |
|---|---|---|---|
| 2001 | 2008 | Gabriel Moulin | DVG |
| 2008 | 2014 | Jean-Louis-Royer | |
| 2014 | 2020 | Monique Renaudin | |
| 2020 | 2026 | Monique Febvre | |

== Demography ==
Historical population

| Year | Pop. | ±% p.a. |
|---|---|---|
| 1793 | 321 | — |
| 1821 | 385 | +0.65% |
| 1846 | 409 | +0.24% |
| 1872 | 357 | −0.52% |
| 1901 | 254 | −1.17% |
| 1926 | 147 | −2.16% |
| 1946 | 165 | +0.58% |
| 1962 | 103 | −2.90% |
| 1968 | 92 | −1.86% |

| Year | Pop. | ±% p.a. |
|---|---|---|
| 1975 | 57 | −6.61% |
| 1982 | 57 | +0.00% |
| 1990 | 67 | +2.04% |
| 1999 | 58 | −1.59% |
| 2007 | 84 | +4.74% |
| 2012 | 100 | +3.55% |
| 2017 | 95 | −1.02% |
| 2023 | 89 | −1.08% |

Source: EHESS and INSEE

== Sites and monuments ==
Aubaine has several Distance Markers (16th century) in the Forest of Crépey which are registered as historical monuments.

There are also the following places of interest in the commune:

- The Church of Aubaine has a Romanesque Apse and pre-choir.
- Lavoirs (Public laundries) in Aubaine, Bécoup, and Crépey.
- The source of the Saint-Quentin was formerly reputed to cure eye diseases.
- Two remarkable Wayside crosses are located in Aubaine. The first, at the entrance to the village, probably dates to the 18th century - it includes statues of Christ and the Virgin in Relief. The second is next to a rural field called Champ de la Croix and dates to the 14th century - it consists of a Greek cross with Christ in bas-relief.
- A Bread oven in the hamlet of Crépey was a communal oven built in the 19th century then restored.

== Cultural Events ==
The Festival of Bread is an event that has taken place since 1985 place around the communal oven every year on the 3rd Sunday in June with the participation of the Aubecray association (an association of law 1901, recreational, cultural, social, and conservation of local heritage activities).

== See also ==
- Communes of the Côte-d'Or department
