= Pont-d'Ouche =

Small french village in Côte-d'Or

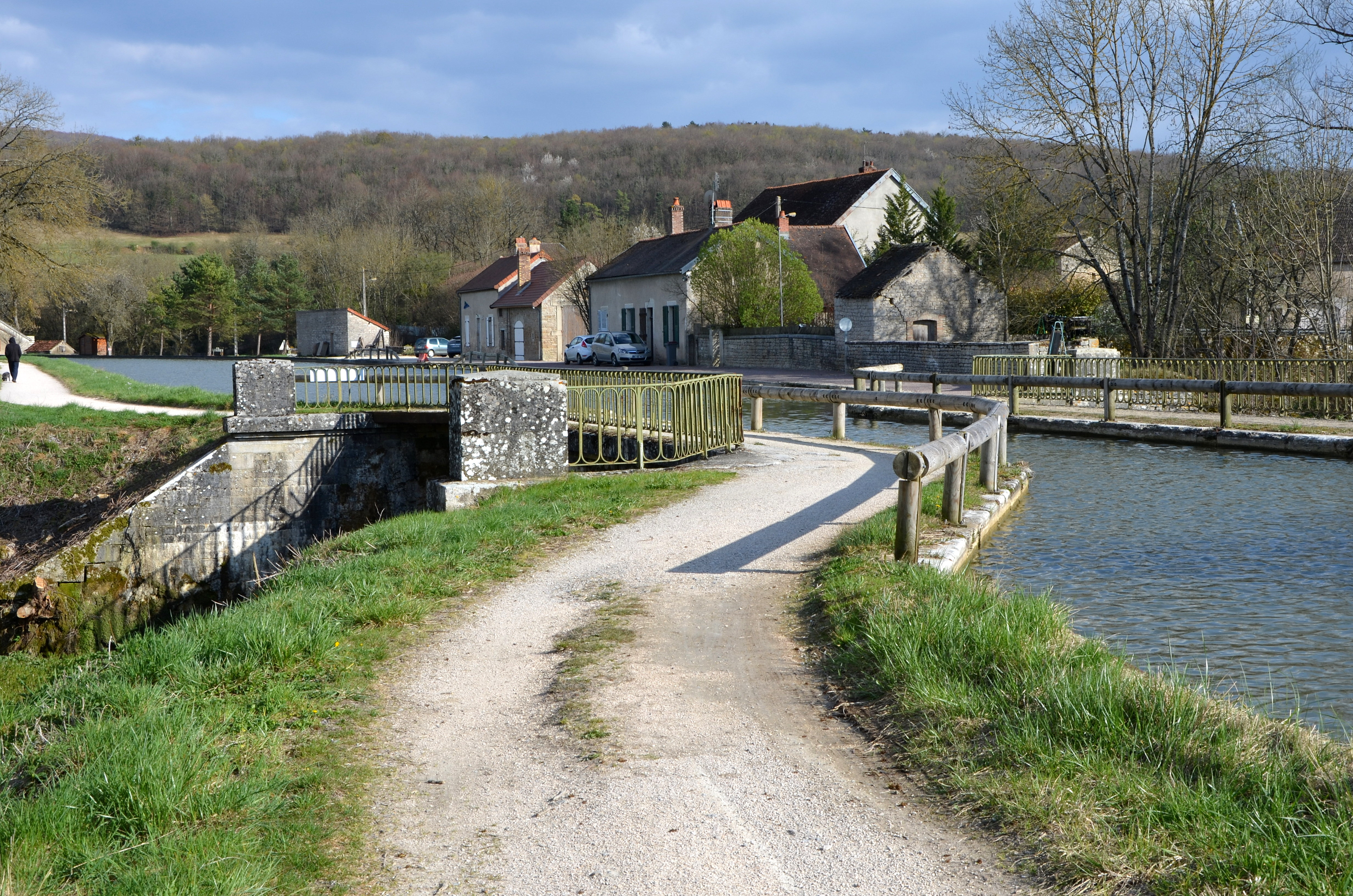
- Aqueduct bridge of the Canal de Bourgogne over the Ouche River in Pont-d'Ouche

- Location in Bourgogne-Franche-Comté
- Coordinates: 47°10′00″N 4°42′02″E
- Region: Bourgogne-Franche-Comté
- Department: Côte-d'Or
- Arrondissement: Arrondissement of Beaune
- Canton: Canton of Bligny-sur-Ouche
- Postal code: 21360

Pont-d'Ouche is a small village in the Côte-d'Or region of Burgundy-Franche-Comté. It is part of the commune of Thorey-sur-Ouche, 2 km to the south. Part of the hamlet's territory is attached to the commune of Aubaine.

Situated on the Saône side of the Burgundy canal, where it makes a 120° turn to head northwest, it was once an important port and is still well known to canal users.

== Atmosphere ==
This is the point at which the Ouche shares its valley with the Burgundy Canal, all the way to Dijon. The D33 road follows the same route to Veuvey-sur-Ouche.

The nearest lock, no. 20, is known as the “Pont-d'Ouche lock” (formerly known as the “Telegraphe lock”). It is 700 m from the nearest lock towards the Saône and 1.1 km from the nearest towards the Yonne. A restaurant/bistro is serving local produce. Boats can fill up with water, empty their garbage into appropriate containers, and have electricity, showers, and toilets at their disposal. Barges moor at stone quays, some of which are reserved for them; smaller boats can use the floating pontoons.

The Pont d'Ouche viaduct overhangs the town by more than 25 m. It is 504 m long and carries the A6 freeway. It was inaugurated on October 29, 1970.

== History ==
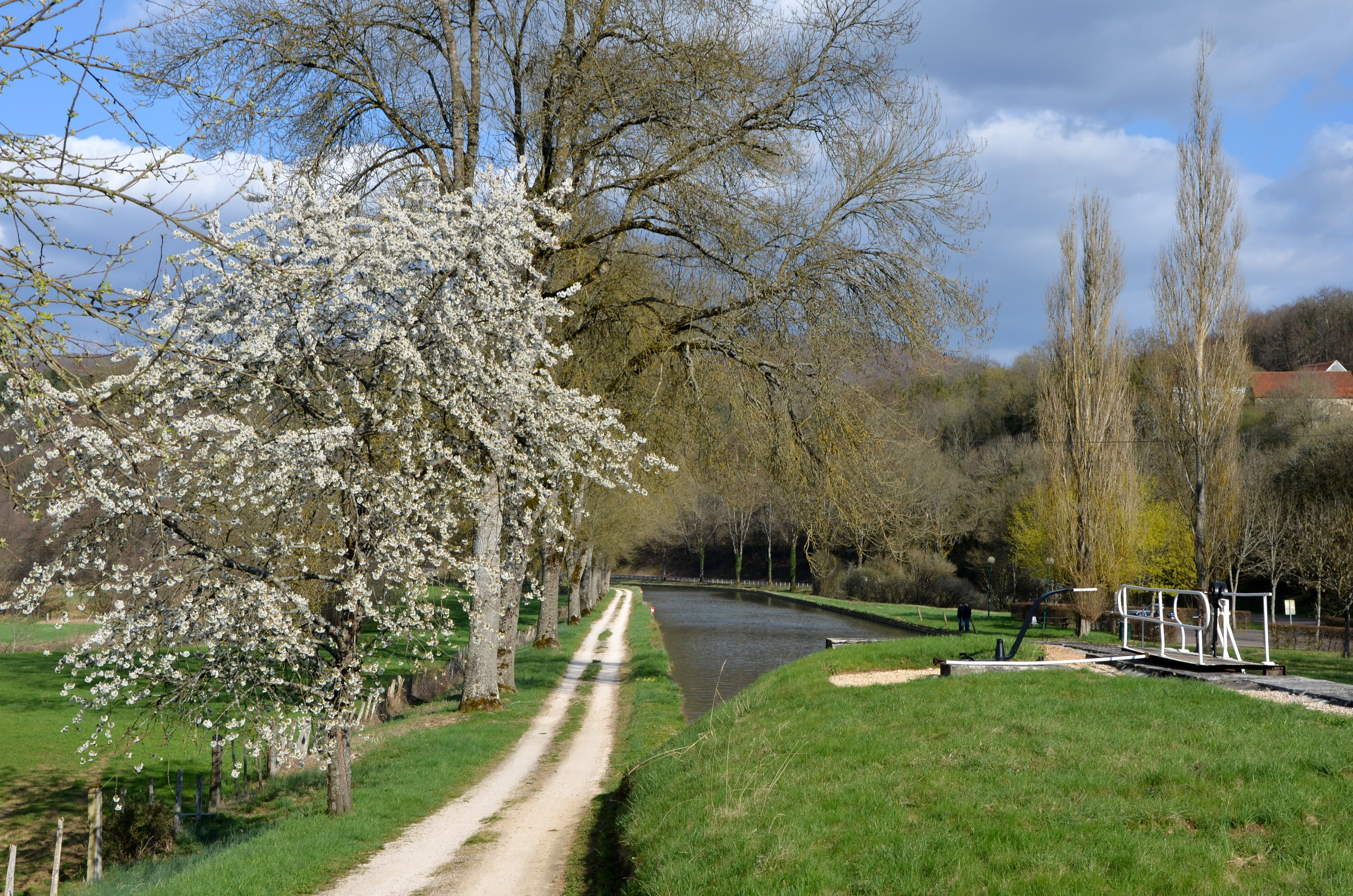
Upstream lock of Pont-d'Ouche on the Burgundy Canal.

Very early in the 19th century, the commune was served by rail, located on the route of the Épinac railroad, built between 1829 and 1835, which ran from Épinac to the Burgundy Canal. Coal from Épinac-les-Mines was brought here by train and loaded onto barges.

In the 19th century, there was a tile factory close to the harbor basin. This factory had its private dock, opening onto the canal. Today, the dock is separated from the canal by a brick wall and is used by ducks, frogs, and other water dwellers.

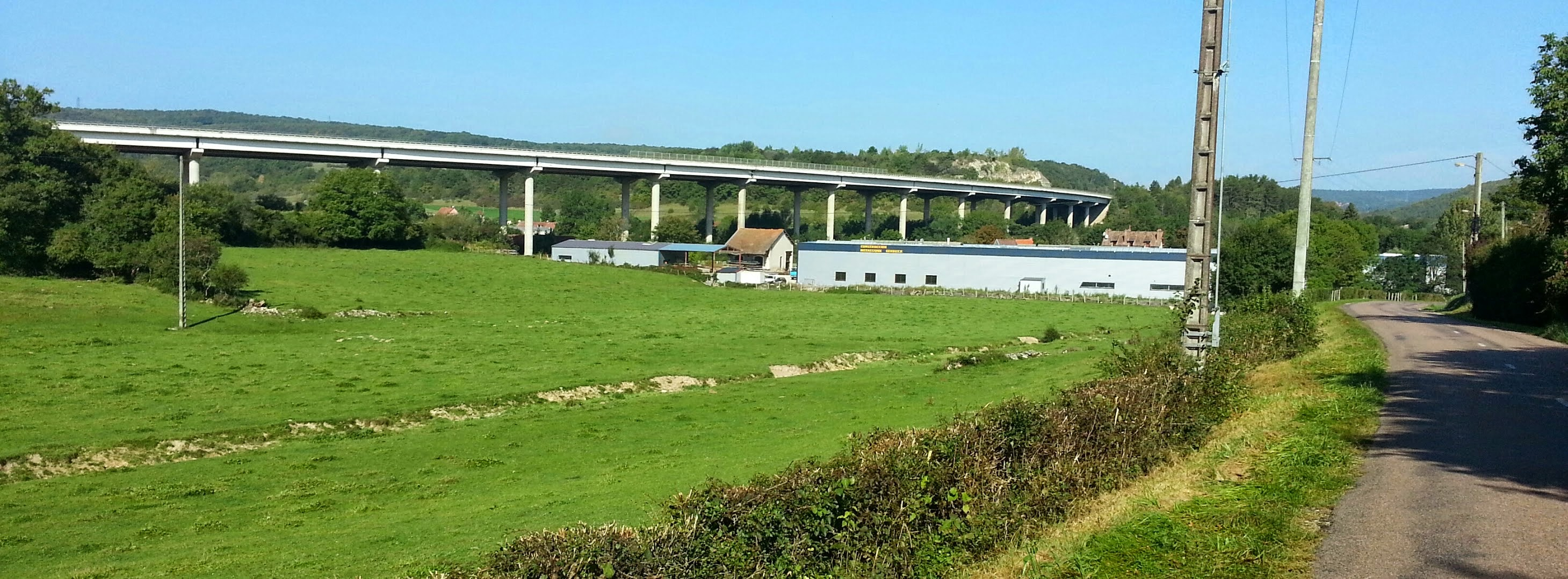
The viaduct.

== Monuments ==
The three-arch canal bridge carries the Burgundy Canal over the Ouche.

== Tourism ==
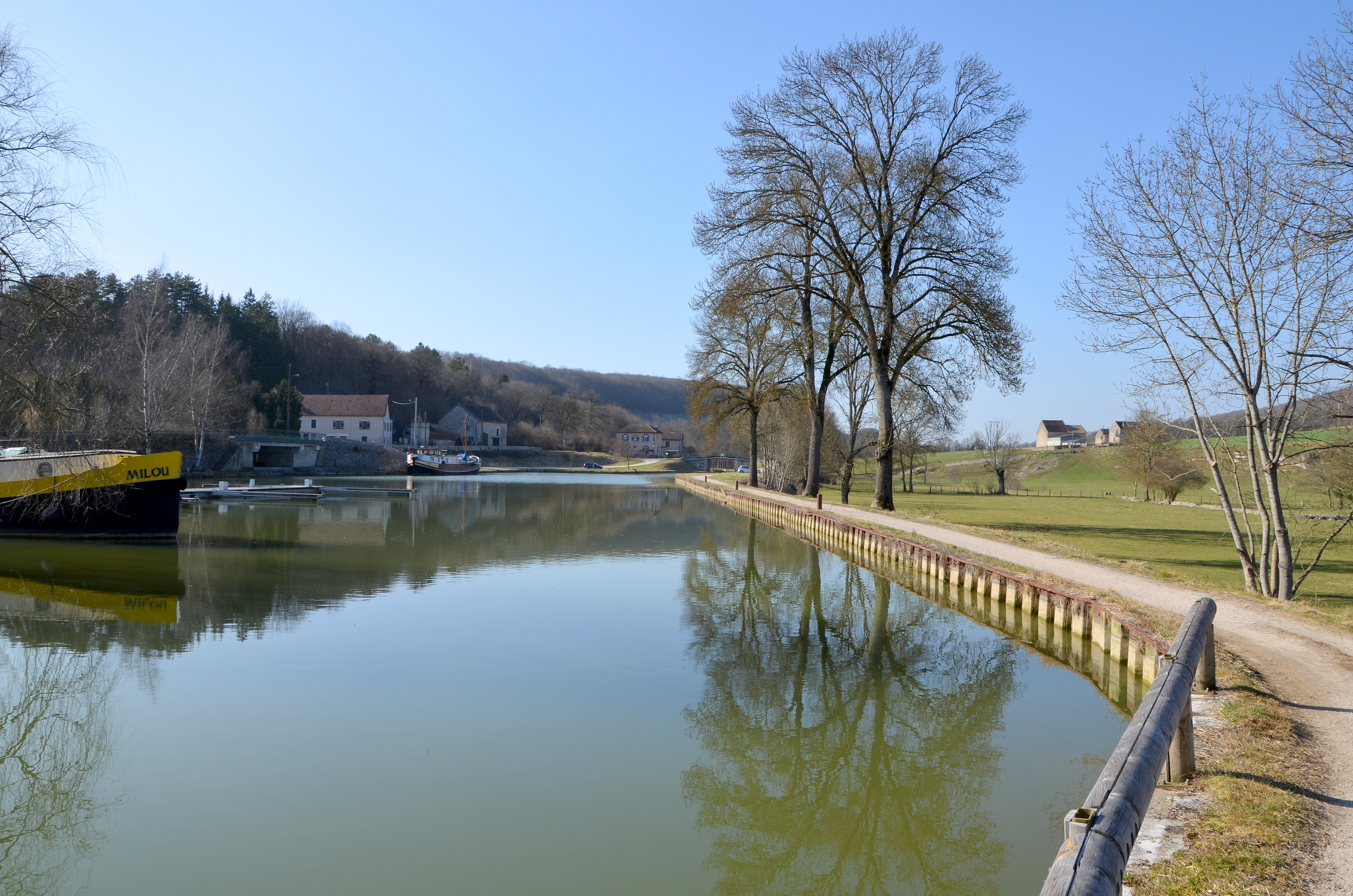
The Burgundy Canal at the Ouche Bridge.

The village is part of the “Pouilly-en-Auxois-Dijon” hiking trail. The Burgundy Canal cycle route also passes through the village.

There are numerous hiking trails. The part of the Burgundy Canal that passes through the Ouche Valley has an excellent reputation for its wild, calm beauty — some place it in the top positions of the entire French waterway network. Today, Pont-d'Ouche has become a popular tourist port, with a few connoisseurs using it as a base for much of the summer.

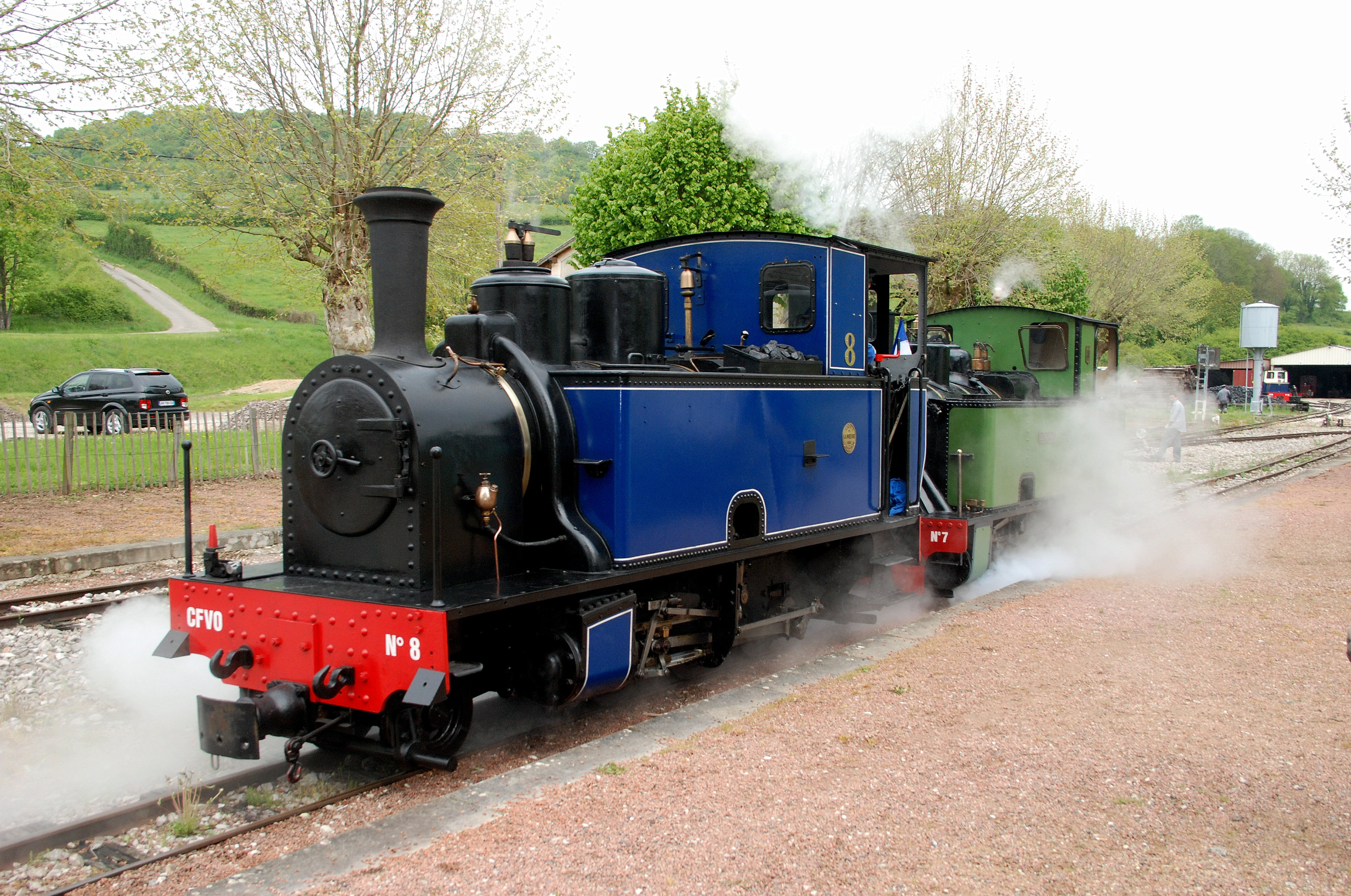
The Ouche Valley tourist train.

Pont-d'Ouche is the arrival point for the tourist train Ouche Valley Railway, which departs from Bligny-sur-Ouche, 7 km away, and follows the route of the old Épinac railroad: built from 1829 to 1835, it ran from Épinac to the Burgundy canal on a 60 cm-wide track. This narrow-gauge steam train has been in operation since 1978 and was awarded the 2010 family tourism trophy.

== Culture ==
In August 1973, Bertrand Blier filmed scenes for the movie Going Places in the lock keeper's house at Pont-d'Ouche.

== See also ==
- Ouche
- Communes of the Côte-d'Or department
