= La Bussière-sur-Ouche =

- Commune
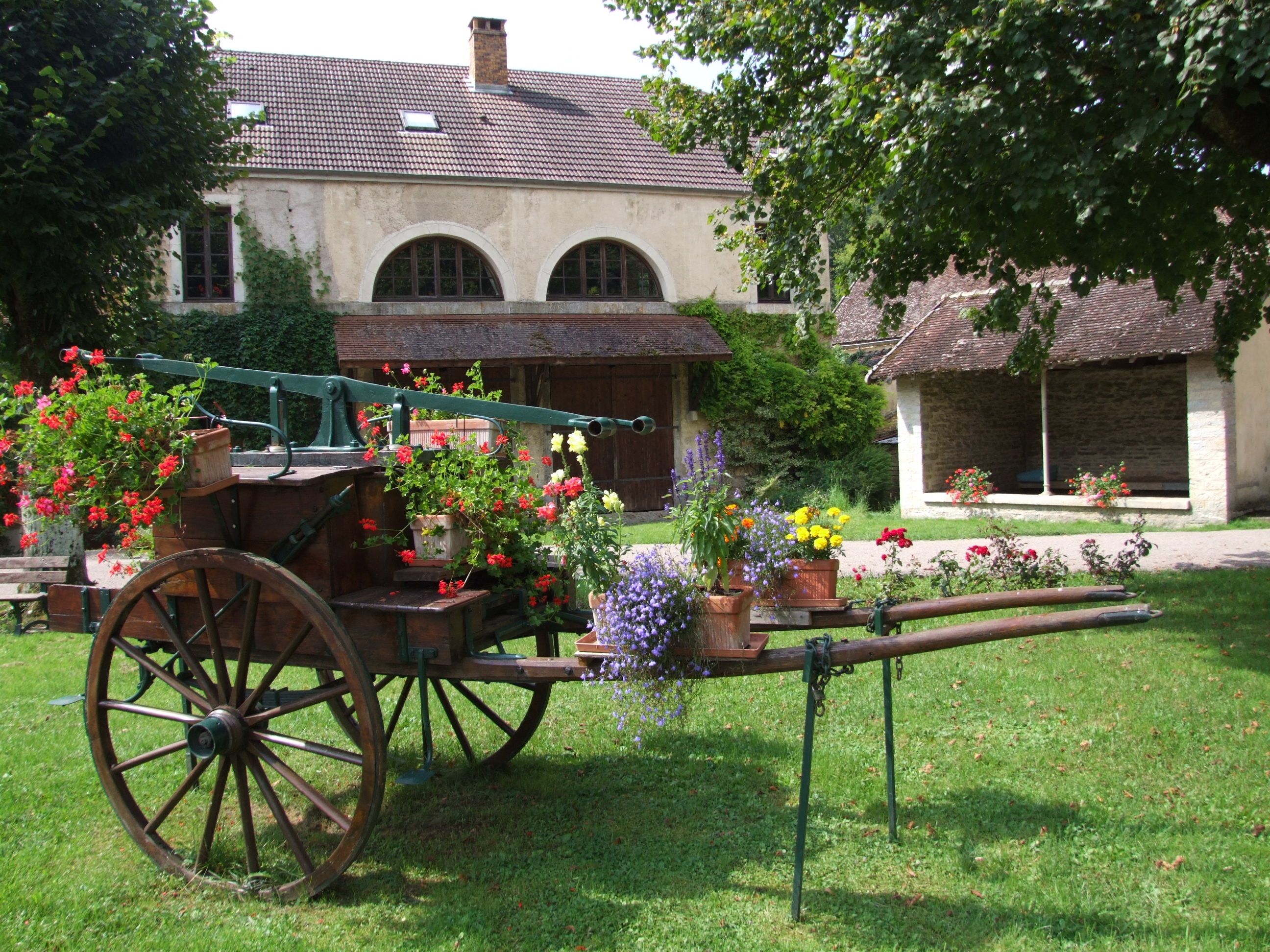
- The village square, with the washhouse in the background

- Coat of arms
- Location of La Bussière-sur-Ouche
- Location within France Location within Bourgogne-Franche-Comté
- Coordinates: 47°13′04″N 4°43′21″E
- Country: France
- Region: Bourgogne-Franche-Comté
- Department: Côte-d'Or
- Arrondissement: Beaune
- Canton: Arnay-le-Duc

Government
  - Mayor (2020–2026): Estelle Boniface
- Area^{1}: 20.65 km^{2} (7.97 sq mi)
- Elevation: 350 m (1,150 ft)
- Highest elevation: 569 m (1,867 ft)
- Lowest elevation: 306 m (1,004 ft)
- Population (2023): 197
  - Density: 9.54/km^{2} (24.7/sq mi)
- Time zone: UTC+01:00 (CET)
  - Summer (DST): UTC+02:00 (CEST)
- INSEE/Postal code: 21120 /21360
- ^{1} French Land Register data, which excludes lakes, ponds, glaciers > 1 km^{2} (0.386 sq mi or 247 acres) and river estuaries.

La Bussière-sur-Ouche (French pronunciation: [la bysjɛʁ syʁ uʃ], literally La Bussière on Ouche) is a commune in the Côte-d'Or department in eastern France.

== Population ==
Historical population
Year	Pop.	±% p.a.
1968	138	—
1975	148	+1.00%
1982	180	+2.84%
1990	220	+2.54%
1999	190	−1.62%
2007	159	−2.20%
2012	138	−2.79%
2017	159	+2.87%
2023	197	+3.64%
Source: INSEE

== See also ==
- Communes of the Côte-d'Or department
