= Albert Guillon =

French composer (1801–1854)

Albert Guillon (1801 – April 1854) was a French composer.

== Career ==
Born in Meaux, in 1801, Guillon had lessons at the school of the cathedral Notre Dame de Paris with Pierre Desvignes, before he joined the Conservatoire de Paris to study counterpoint with François-Joseph Fétis and musical composition with Henri Montan Berton. At the same time he was double bassist at the Opéra-Comique.

In 1824, he won the first Second Grand Prix de Rome with the cantata Agnès Sorel. After his stay in the Villa Medici in Rome, 1826–27, he settled in Venice. There he composed the opera Maria di Brabante, which was performed in 1830 at the Teatro La Fenice with great success.

Later he gave up his musical career and turned to agriculture and silkworm breeding. At Treviso he built a factory for processing caterpillar cocoons. His innovations found the attention of Italian agricultural societies and the Société impériale et centrale d'agriculture.

He died in Venice.
