= Velars-sur-Ouche =

- Commune
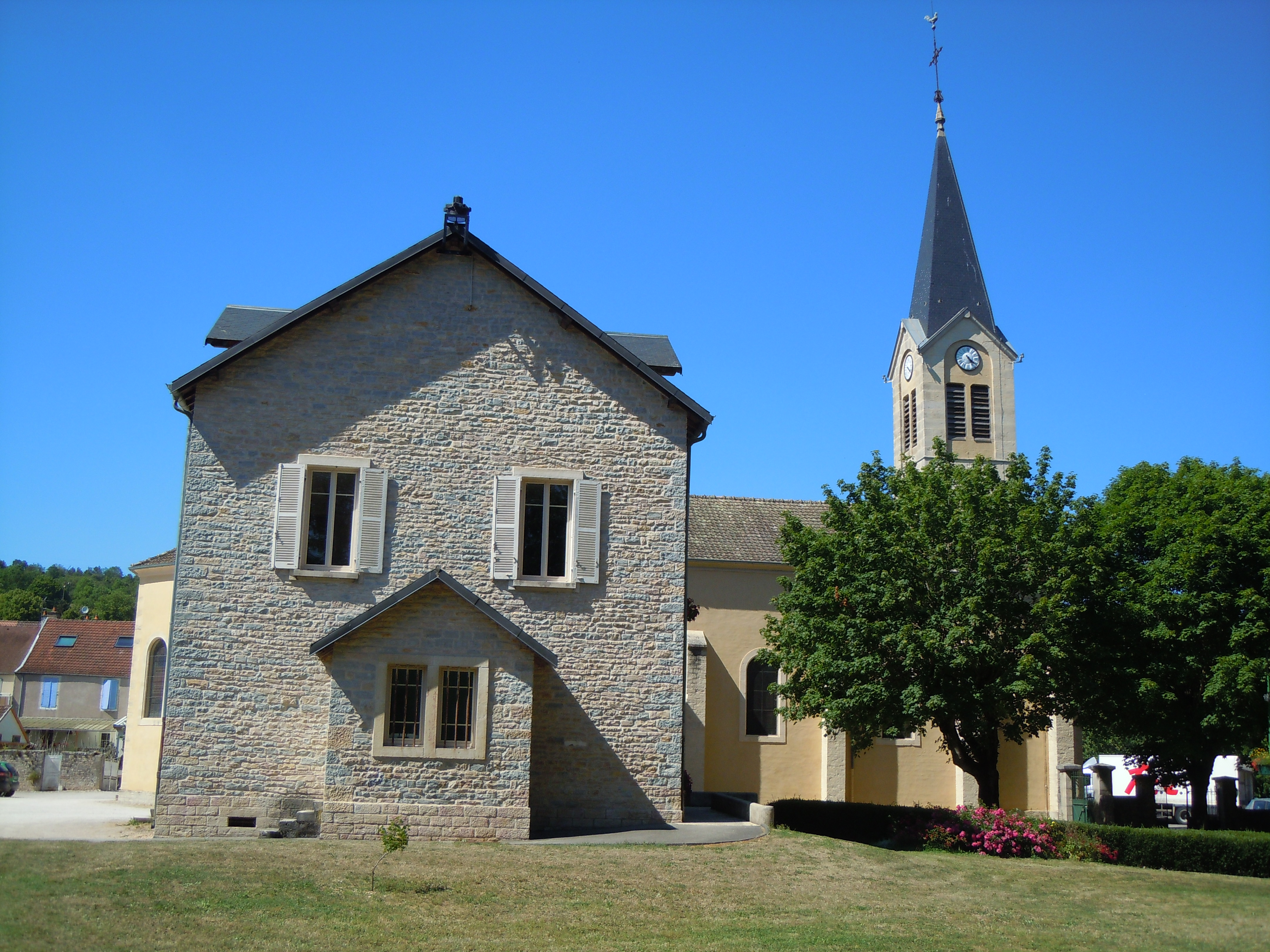
- The town hall and church in Velars-sur-Ouche

- Coat of arms
- Location of Velars-sur-Ouche
- Location within France Location within Bourgogne-Franche-Comté
- Coordinates: 47°19′16″N 4°54′20″E
- Country: France
- Region: Bourgogne-Franche-Comté
- Department: Côte-d'Or
- Arrondissement: Dijon
- Canton: Talant

Government
  - Mayor (2020–2026): Thierry Jean
- Area^{1}: 12.13 km^{2} (4.68 sq mi)
- Highest elevation: 586 m (1,923 ft)
- Lowest elevation: 254 m (833 ft)
- Population (2023): 1,798
  - Density: 148.2/km^{2} (383.9/sq mi)
- Time zone: UTC+01:00 (CET)
  - Summer (DST): UTC+02:00 (CEST)
- INSEE/Postal code: 21661 /21370
- ^{1} French Land Register data, which excludes lakes, ponds, glaciers > 1 km^{2} (0.386 sq mi or 247 acres) and river estuaries.

Velars-sur-Ouche (French pronunciation: [vəlaʁ syʁ uʃ], literally Velars on Ouche) is a commune in the Côte-d'Or department in eastern France. The composer Pierre Desvignes (1764 – 1827) was born in this village.

== Population ==
Historical population
Year	Pop.	±% p.a.
1968	792	—
1975	869	+1.33%
1982	1,313	+6.07%
1990	1,422	+1.00%
1999	1,666	+1.78%
2007	1,658	−0.06%
2012	1,734	+0.90%
2017	1,698	−0.42%
2023	1,798	+0.96%
Source: INSEE

== See also ==
- Communes of the Côte-d'Or department
