= Veuvey-sur-Ouche =

- Commune
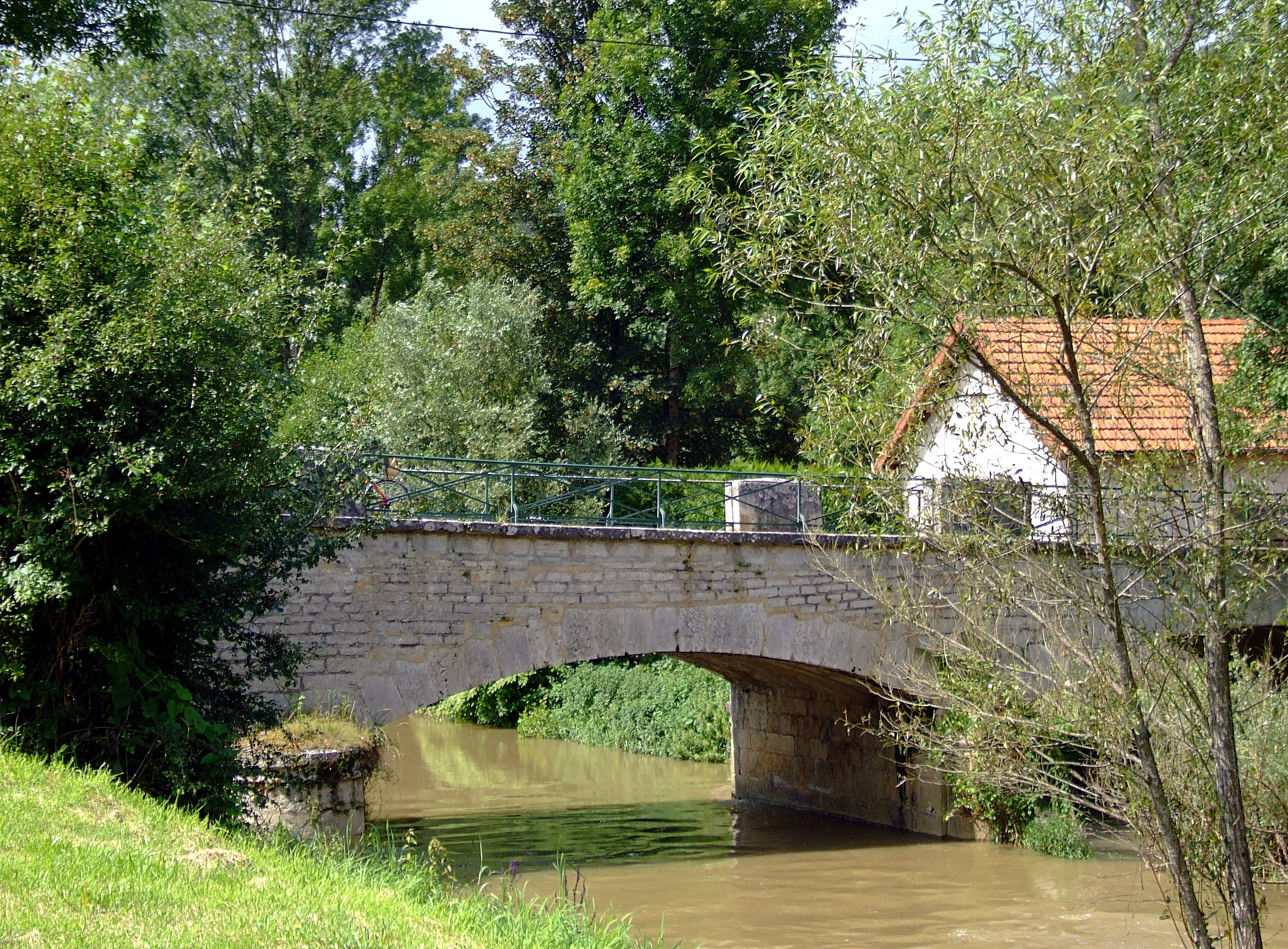
- Bridge on the Ouche
- Location of Veuvey-sur-Ouche
- Location within France Location within Bourgogne-Franche-Comté
- Coordinates: 47°11′08″N 4°42′59″E
- Country: France
- Region: Bourgogne-Franche-Comté
- Department: Côte-d'Or
- Arrondissement: Beaune
- Canton: Arnay-le-Duc

Government
  - Mayor (2020–2026): Anne-Marie Bazerolle
- Area^{1}: 10.04 km^{2} (3.88 sq mi)
- Elevation: 327 m (1,073 ft)
- Highest elevation: 570 m (1,870 ft)
- Lowest elevation: 312 m (1,024 ft)
- Population (2023): 204
  - Density: 20.3/km^{2} (52.6/sq mi)
- Time zone: UTC+01:00 (CET)
  - Summer (DST): UTC+02:00 (CEST)
- INSEE/Postal code: 21673 /21360
- ^{1} French Land Register data, which excludes lakes, ponds, glaciers > 1 km^{2} (0.386 sq mi or 247 acres) and river estuaries.

Veuvey-sur-Ouche (French pronunciation: [vøvɛ syʁ uʃ], literally Veuvey on Ouche) is a commune in the Côte-d'Or department in eastern France.

== Population ==
Historical population
Year	Pop.	±% p.a.
1968	211	—
1975	169	−3.12%
1982	188	+1.53%
1990	161	−1.92%
1999	154	−0.49%
2007	170	+1.24%
2012	210	+4.32%
2017	209	−0.10%
2023	204	−0.40%
Source: INSEE

== See also ==
- Communes of the Côte-d'Or department
