= Pierre Desvignes =

French composer (1764–1827)

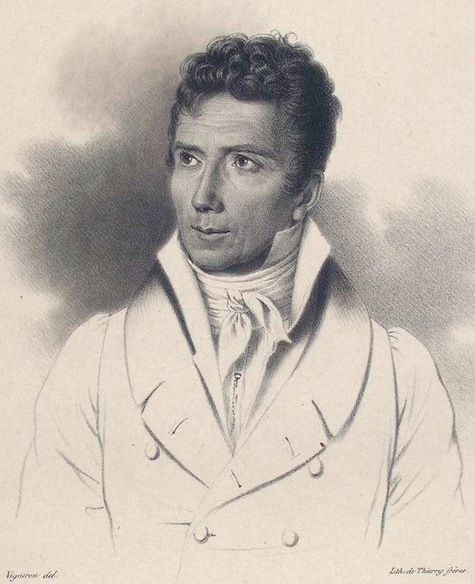
Pierre Desvignes by Thierry frères (XIXth) after Pierre-Roch Vigneron (1789–1872)

Pierre Desvignes (27 September 1764 – 27 January 1827) was a French composer.

== Life ==
Born in Velars-sur-Ouche (Burgundy) (modern department of Côte-d'Or), from a family of modest farmers, Desvignes was quickly noticed for his voice and admitted as Altar server (child singing in the choir) of the Église Saint-Étienne de Dijon. He received extensive training there, designed to turn these young singers into future professional performers. He then received further training at the musical school of the Dijon Cathedral where he had the chance to have as his teacher Jean-François Lesueur, who had himself been trained in chœurs d'église (in Picardy) before the French Revolution in 1789. It was there that Desvignes composed his first major work in 1780, a 4-part Mass. Resolutely modern in inspiration, this small piece (a four-part choir and four soloists, without instruments) requires high level performers: for centuries, all members of the church choirs were professional, until the brutal suppression of the ecclesiastical chapters in 1790.

Lesueur then had him appointed Kapellmeister to the Évreux Cathedral. He was 17 years old. Desvignes stayed only a few months in this position, which he left in 1782 to become chapel master at the Chartres Cathedral, an important place in the kingdom, where he made himself known as a composer of sacred music. The dispersal of the cathedral chapters and their staff by the Revolution in 1790, followed by the closure of the churches in 1793, ended this first career.

Desvignes then moved to Paris and converted to opera. He composed several patriotic tunes for the Théâtre de la Cité.

Appointed professor in 1793 at the newly founded Conservatoire de Paris, he became chapel master of the Notre-Dame de Paris cathedral in 1802, shortly after the signing of the Concordat between Bonaparte and the papacy, a treaty that allowed the churches to reopen, expected and initiated (informally or very limited) from 1795/1796. As had been the case before throughout France, the mission of the Notre-Dame music school was to train the young singers who were members of the choir (holding the soprano part), with the ambition of making them (once they have become adults) professional members of the choir of the Metropolitan Church of Paris, or of the other churches in France. Despite a cruel lack of financial resources (because the Ancien Regime had not been resurrected), Desvignes then worked to restore the educational establishment abolished by the Revolution (the Christian religion and all its manifestations had been banned in 1793, under the Reign of Terror, while the cathedral had been transformed into a Temple of Reason). In this position, Desvignes trained quite a few young people who played a role in the development of French music of that time. Some of them were the double bassist and professor at the Conservatoire, Armand Durier; the Grand prix de Rome Albert Guillon; the organist and composer Alphonse Gilbert, second Grand Prix de Rome; the librarian of the Conservatoire Auguste Bottée de Toulmon; the harpist François-Joseph Naderman and, of course, the composer Émile Bienaimé, also second Grand Prix of Rome, whom Desvignes appointed as music master, i. e. conductor and master of the choir of Notre-Dame de Paris.

In 1811, Desvignes became deputy head of the musical chapel of Napoléon Ier at the Tuileries Palace. He became a member of the Académie des Sciences, Arts et Belles-Lettres de Dijon in 1820.

Throughout his career, Desvignes has tried both sacred and secular music, especially lyrical music. Among his most striking creations, the Lamentations de Jérémie (text taken from the Bible is worth mentioning, quite often set to music), his Te Deum and, particularly, a Funeral March for 5-part choir and orchestra, curiously written from the liturgical Pie Jesu. It was composed on the occasion of the service celebrated at Notre-Dame-de-Paris in 1806 to commemorate the dead of the Battle of Austerlitz. His contemporary, the critic Albert Gilbert, considered it "as one of his most remarkable inspirations". The composer took it over in 1808 on the occasion of the death of cardinal de Belloy, the Archbishop of Paris. The audience was impressed and attributed it to Mozart, whose Mass of Requiem was performed during the same service.

Pierre Desvignes died in 1827 in Paris and it was his student Émile Bienaimé who was chosen to succeed him.

== Works ==
Desvigne's work was manifold. He composed four opéras comiques, two serious operas, eleven masses, ninety-five motets, eleven psalm settings and four cantatas, as well as two practice pieces.

- Messe à quatre parties, volume 91 of editions of the Centre de musique baroque de Versailles, Patrimoine musical bourguignon, 2005, 40 pages – in Latin.
- La Fête de l'égalité, pantomi-lyrical melodrama, in one act and in verse – First edition published in 1793 in French.
- Pie Jesu Domine, in the form of a Funeral March for choir and orchestra, composed in 1806 for the first anniversary service celebrated at Notre-Dame de Paris in memory of the dead of the Battle of Austerlitz and given again for the burial of His E. the Cardinal of Belloy, Archbishop of Paris (1808). By P. Desvignes, music master of the Notre-Dame Basilica. Reduced with organ or piano accompaniment. By Adrien de La Fage and Pierre Desvignes – 3 editions published in 1808 en Latin.
- Sigismond III. in Kraków. Heroic drama in two acts, mingled with songs and preceded by a prologue.
- Cantate en l'honneur de Napoléon 1er.
- Te Deum laudamus – in Latin. [Voice (3), 4-part choir, orchestra. D major.] Publication: [between 1782 and 1804] Imprimeur/fabricant: M. Perrier; François Marie Andrieu.
- Messe à Grand Chœur avec Symphonie (in F minor) – in Latin.
- Magnus Dominus, Motet à G[ran]d Orchestre – in Latin.
- De Profundis with harmony accompaniment – 2 editions published in 1806 in Latin.

== Sources ==
- A.-P.-M. Gilbert, in Revue et Gazette musicale de Paris, 7th year, 1840. N°38, 31 May 1840, pages. 322–23.
- Joseph Dietsch, Souvenirs musicaux de la Sainte-Chapelle du Roy à Dijon. Pierre Desvignes, Dijon, Impr. de l'Union typographique, Mersch, 1884.
- Messe à 4 parties on Centre de musique baroque de Versailles
