= Jules Turgan =

French chansonnier and physicist

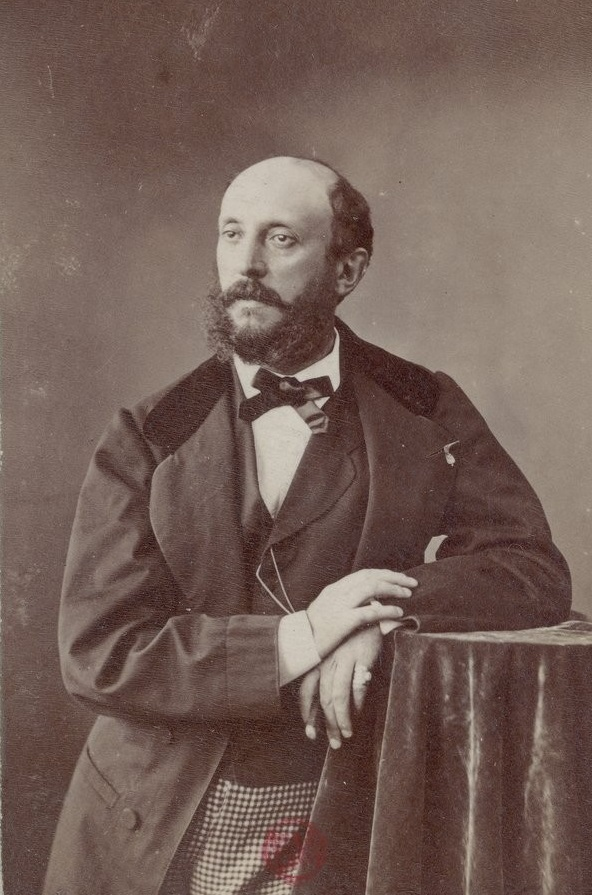
- Born: François Julien Turgan; 8 February 1824; Paris
- Died: 16 February 1887 (aged 63); Tours
- Occupations: Chansonnier; Journalist

François Julien (called Jules or Julien) Turgan (8 February 1824 – 16 February 1887) was a 19th-century French chansonnier, medical doctor and journalist.

== Biography ==
Turgan studied at the collège royal de Saint-Louis where he excelled in Latin version (1838). From 1842, he was a lyricist for Émile Bienaimé and became a physician. He stood out in 1848 by his acts of devotion during the days of June and during the cholera epidemic.

A scientific editor for L'Événement then at the Le Bien-être universel, he established La Fabrique, la ferme, l'atelier (1851–1853), a popular science newspaper. Assistant manager of the Journal officiel (1852–1858), a friend of Théophile Gautier, he became director of Le Moniteur universel in 1852. He was also a resident member of the Science section of the "Comité des travaux historiques et scientifiques" (1870–1877).

== Works ==
- 1842: Les Écoliers de Paris, nocturne, music by Émile Bienaimé
- 1842: Vole, ma noire gondole, melody, music by Émile Bienaimé
- 1851: Les Ballons, histoire de la locomotion aérienne depuis son origine jusqu'à nos jours, foreword by Gérard de Nerval
- 1860: Orfèvrerie Christofle
- 1860–1868 Les Grandes usines en France, 8 vols.
- 1867: Études sur l'Exposition universelle
- 1867: L'Artillerie moderne à grande puissance, études et renseignements
- 1880: L'Évolution légale
- 1880: Le Sénégal, sa colonisation par l'enseignement populaire
- 1882: Les Établissements Duval

== Bibliography ==
- Pierre Larousse, Le Grand dictionnaire universel du XIXe siècle, vol.7, 1898, (p. 1159)
- Gustave Vapereau, Dictionnaire universel des contemporains, 1880, (p. 1777)
- Notice nécrologique de Julien Turgan, La Nature, 1887
- René Martin, La vie d'un grand journaliste, 1948, (p. 106)
