= Émile Bienaimé =

French composer

- Born: Paul Émile Bienaimé; 6 July 1802; Paris
- Died: 17 January 1869 (aged 66); Paris
- Occupation: Composer

Paul Émile Bienaimé (6 July 1802 – 17 January 1869) was a 19th-century French composer.

== Biography ==
A pupil at the école cathédrale de Paris, he studied at the Conservatoire with Victor Dourlen and François-Joseph Fétis. In 1822 he won the prize in harmony and in 1825, was laureate of a competition of musical composition organised by the Conservatoire with a four-act fugue and finished in second place of the prix de Rome with his cantata Herminie in 1826.

In 1827, he succeeded Pierre Desvignes as kapellmeister at Notre-Dame de Paris where he would play most of his sacred works, such as the Requiem in 1830 with large orchestra in honour of Louis XVI and Marie Antoinette.

With François-Antoine Habeneck he founded the "Société des concerts du Conservatoire" in 1828. His position at Notre-Dame was abolished after the July Revolution. He then devoted himself to teaching at the Conservatory in the classes of harmony and accompaniment, which he left in 1864 to retire.

== Works ==
He wrote sacred music, works for salon, an orchestral overture and books on music education (Cinquante études d'harmonie pratique, Paris, 1844).

- 1842: Les Écoliers de Paris, nocturne, lyrics by Jules Turgan
- 1842: Vole, ma noire gondole, melody, lyrics by Jules Turgan
- 1846: Théodie, songbook with several voices on Sacred History
- 1850: Les Papillons d'or, valse for piano four-hands, op.11
- 1855: Nérina !, polka-mazurka for piano
- 1856: Le Gâteau des Rois, ballade for barytone, lyrics by Edmond de Faulques
- 1857: Le Petit ange, romance, lyrics by Eugène Mahon
- 1858: Fleur de Bohême, polka for piano
- 1859: Ave Regina coelorum. Antienne à la Vierge. À quatre voix
- 1866: Éloge de la paresse, ditty, lyrics by Antignac
- 1869: L'Enfant et le passereau, arranged by par F. Morand, lyrics by Spenner
- 1869: Mai, couplets à trois voix égales, 1857, later arranged with accompaniment with piano by F. Morand, lyrics by Spenner
- undated: Chant français à l'occasion du Sacre de Charles X, lyrics by Octave Uzanne
- undated: Le Départ de la goélette, ditty, lyrics by Poisson
- undated: Fugue à huit voix réelles
- undated: Priez Dieu, romance, lyrics by Poisson

== Bibliography ==
- Louis Gustave Vapereau, Dictionnaire universel des contemporains, vol. 1, 1858, (p. 199)
- Théodore Lassabathie, Histoire du Conservatoire impérial de musique, 1860, (p. 426)
