= Bligny-sur-Ouche =

- Commune
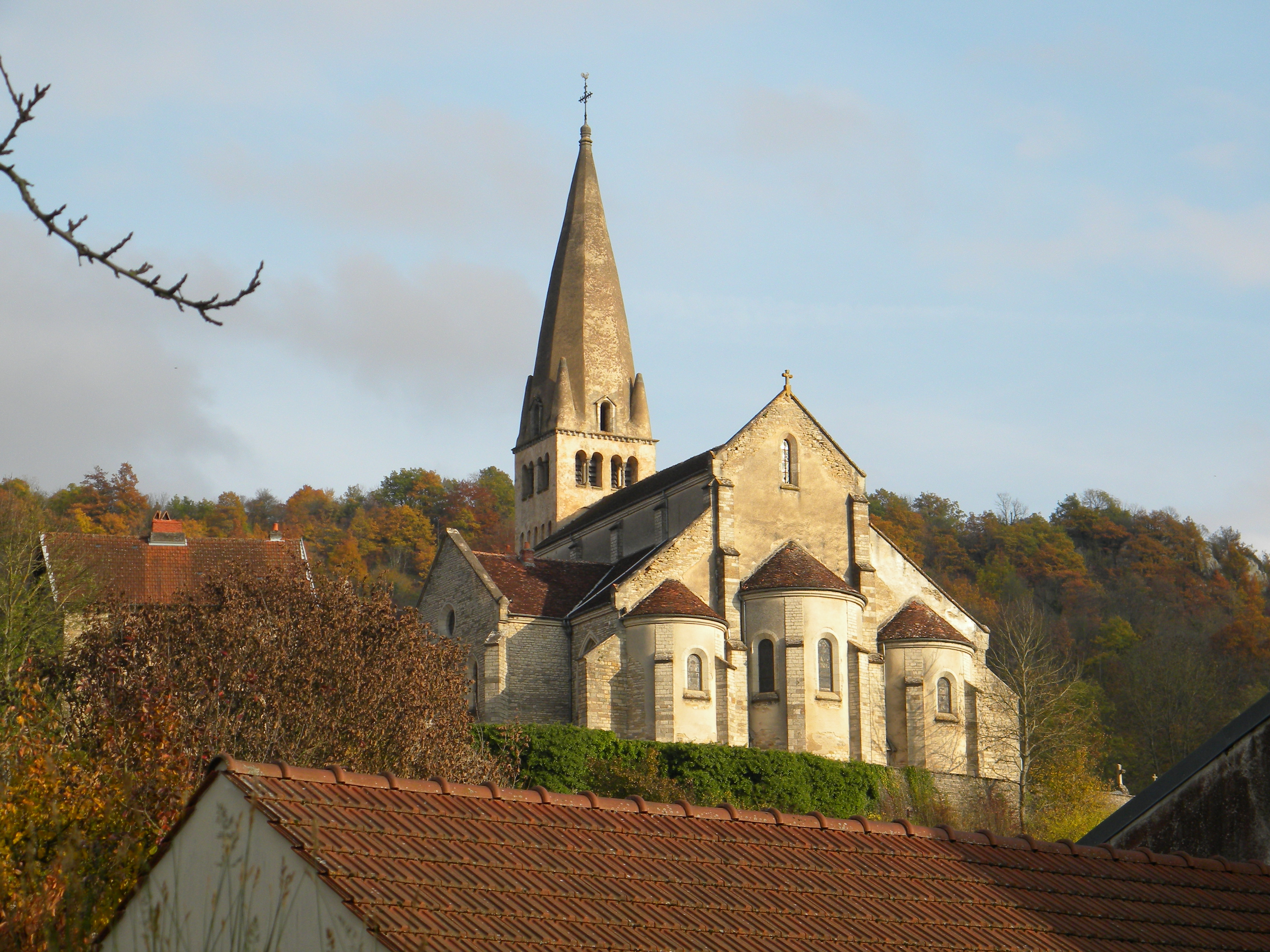
- The church in Bligny-sur-Ouche

- Coat of arms
- Location of Bligny-sur-Ouche
- Location within France Location within Bourgogne-Franche-Comté
- Coordinates: 47°06′25″N 4°40′14″E
- Country: France
- Region: Bourgogne-Franche-Comté
- Department: Côte-d'Or
- Arrondissement: Beaune
- Canton: Arnay-le-Duc
- Intercommunality: Pouilly-en-Auxois/Bligny-sur-Ouche

Government
  - Mayor (2020–2026): Denis Myotte
- Area^{1}: 27.99 km^{2} (10.81 sq mi)
- Elevation: 363 m (1,191 ft)
- Highest elevation: 549 m (1,801 ft)
- Lowest elevation: 337 m (1,106 ft)
- Population (2023): 814
  - Density: 29.1/km^{2} (75.3/sq mi)
- Time zone: UTC+01:00 (CET)
  - Summer (DST): UTC+02:00 (CEST)
- INSEE/Postal code: 21087 /21360
- ^{1} French Land Register data, which excludes lakes, ponds, glaciers > 1 km^{2} (0.386 sq mi or 247 acres) and river estuaries.

Bligny-sur-Ouche (French pronunciation: [bliɲi syʁ uʃ], literally Bligny on Ouche) is a commune in the Côte-d'Or department in eastern France.

== History ==
The history of Bligny is ancient. Its church is an interesting monument to visit (constructed within an old medieval castle) and is dedicated to Saint Germain l'Auxerrois.

The history of the rural community of Bligny is characterized by a specific political organisation to the extent it was under the dual jurisdiction of the Bishop of Autun and the Duke of Burgundy. As a result, it was self-organised from the medieval times and ruled by a local mayor (the position was kept in the same family Le Maire).

Since the 12th century, the village was protected by a regiment of archers which was constituted by all the valid men of the community (the regiment remained faithful to the Duke of Burgundy and was therefore dissolved).

To a certain extent, this regiment still remains through the existence of the Confrérie Saint Sébastien which is a Catholic organisation running charities and involved in the local parish and the local hospital (the Confrérie is composed of around 300 members and has a "batonnier"). The coat of arms of Bligny is a bow by reference to this regiment and the Confrérie de la Saint Sébastien.

The famous writer Michel Tournier has spent much time in Bligny in his childhood (his grandfather held a chemistry) and has written about Bligny-sur-Ouche and Lusigny-sur-Ouche in his book Le vent Paraclet translated in English as The Wind Spirit (his most unsuccessful book!). He notably narrates the intrusion of the Prussians in the 1870s (more anecdotical) and the Germans in the 1940s (notably the dramatic events which occurred in Lusigny at the end of the war).

The history of Bligny-sur-Ouche was written in the early 20th century (well-written and complete book). A few monographs were also published and even a detective story was published recently embarrassing all the various historical and geographical elements of Bligny. However, a real academic history of Bligny still needs to be written. All the references are published on the French version of the article Wikipedia.

== Population ==
Historical population
Year	Pop.	±% p.a.
1968	750	—
1975	719	−0.60%
1982	765	+0.89%
1990	745	−0.33%
1999	750	+0.07%
2007	832	+1.31%
2012	846	+0.33%
2017	831	−0.36%
2023	814	−0.34%
Source: INSEE

== See also ==
- Communes of the Côte-d'Or department
