= Ouche =

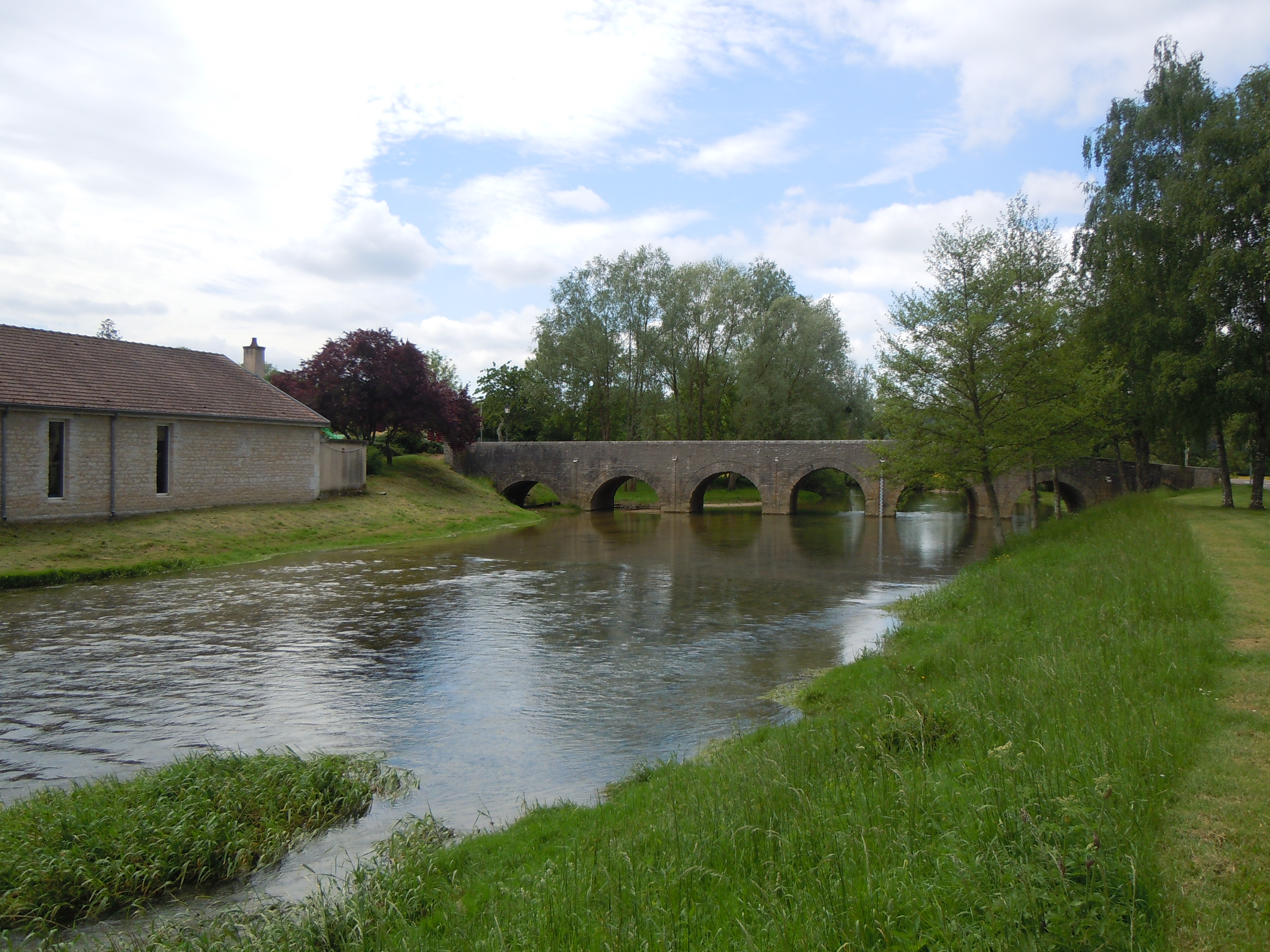
- Bridge over Ouche river in Fleurey-sur-Ouche

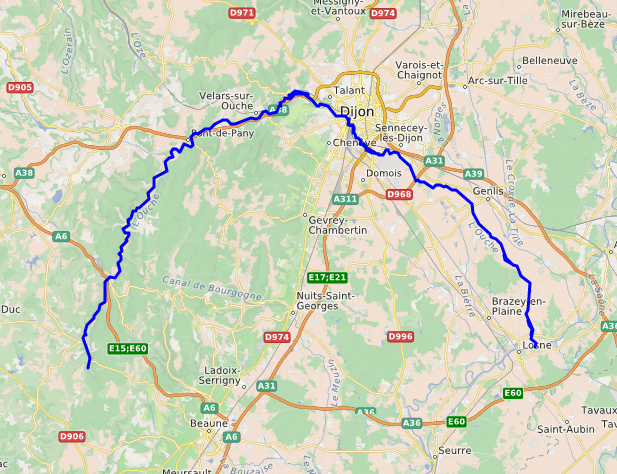

Location
- Country: France

Physical characteristics
- Mouth
  - location: Saône
  - coordinates: 47°6′11″N 5°17′3″E
- Length: 95 km (59 mi)

Basin features
- Progression: Saône→ Rhône→ Mediterranean Sea

The Ouche (French pronunciation: [uʃ]) is a river in the Côte-d'Or department in eastern France. It is a right tributary of the Saône, which it joins in Échenon. It is 95.4 km (59.3 mi) long. Its source is in Lusigny-sur-Ouche. The Ouche flows through the towns of Bligny-sur-Ouche, La Bussière-sur-Ouche, Fleurey-sur-Ouche, Velars-sur-Ouche, Dijon, Longvic and Varanges. Part of the Canal de Bourgogne runs through the Ouche valley.

== See also ==
- Pont-d'Ouche
