= Chaudenay =

Chaudenay may refer to the following places in France:

- Chaudenay, Haute-Marne, a commune in the Haute-Marne department
- Chaudenay, Saône-et-Loire, a commune in the Saône-et-Loire department
- Chaudenay-la-Ville, a commune in the Côte-d'Or department
- Chaudenay-le-Château, a commune in the Côte-d'Or department

== Other uses ==
- An alternative name for the wine grape Chardonnay
