= Auxant =

- Commune
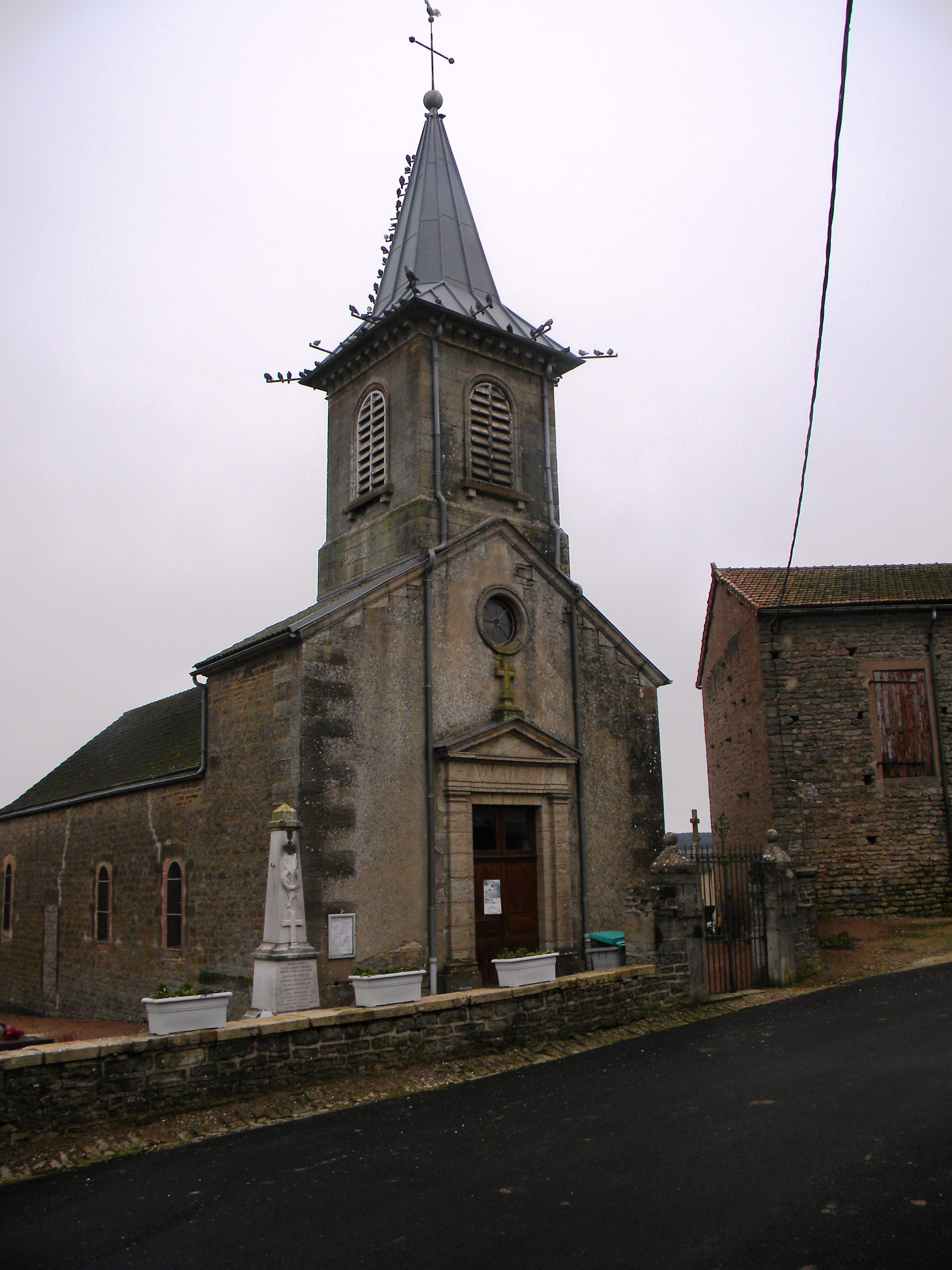
- The church in Auxant
- Location of Auxant
- Location within France Location within Bourgogne-Franche-Comté
- Coordinates: 47°07′28″N 4°37′31″E
- Country: France
- Region: Bourgogne-Franche-Comté
- Department: Côte-d'Or
- Arrondissement: Beaune
- Canton: Arnay-le-Duc
- Intercommunality: CC Pouilly-en-Auxois Bligny-sur-Ouche

Government
  - Mayor (2020–2026): Jean-Paul Giboulot
- Area^{1}: 5.56 km^{2} (2.15 sq mi)
- Elevation: 395 m (1,296 ft)
- Highest elevation: 470 m (1,540 ft)
- Lowest elevation: 365 m (1,198 ft)
- Population (2023): 80
  - Density: 14/km^{2} (37/sq mi)
- Time zone: UTC+01:00 (CET)
  - Summer (DST): UTC+02:00 (CEST)
- INSEE/Postal code: 21036 /21360
- ^{1} French Land Register data, which excludes lakes, ponds, glaciers > 1 km^{2} (0.386 sq mi or 247 acres) and river estuaries.

Auxant (French pronunciation: [oksɑ̃]) is a commune in the Côte-d'Or department in the Bourgogne-Franche-Comté region of central-eastern France.

== Geography ==
Auxant is located some 20 km north-west of Beaune and 12 km east of Arnay-le-Duc. Access to the commune is by the D 970 road from Sainte-Sabine in the north which passes through the centre of the commune east of the village and continues south-east to Bligny-sur-Ouche. The D 17 road from Antigny-le-Château in the west passes through the south of the commune and joins the D 970 to the south-east. Access to the village is by local roads from the D 970 and from the south. There are large forests in the north-west of the commune (the Forêt d'Auxant and the Bois Fein) with the rest of the commune farmland.

The Eclin river flows through the commune from north-west to south-east and continues to join the Ouche at Bligny-sur-Ouche. The Ruisseau de Navelan rises in the north-east of the commune and flows south-west to join the Eclin near the village.

== History ==
The church dates to 1830, the same year as three Wayside Crosses and a Cemetery Cross.

== Administration ==
List of Successive Mayors

From	To	Name
2001	2026	Jean-Paul Giboulot

== Demography ==
Historical population

Year	Pop.	±% p.a.
1793	433	—
1821	231	−2.22%
1846	262	+0.50%
1872	211	−0.83%
1901	170	−0.74%
1926	135	−0.92%
1946	101	−1.44%
1962	84	−1.15%
1968	68	−3.46%

Year	Pop.	±% p.a.
1975	57	−2.49%
1982	54	−0.77%
1990	44	−2.53%
1999	39	−1.33%
2007	59	+5.31%
2012	72	+4.06%
2017	74	+0.55%
2023	80	+1.31%

Source: EHESS and INSEE

== See also ==
- Communes of the Côte-d'Or department
