= Cussy-la-Colonne =

- Commune
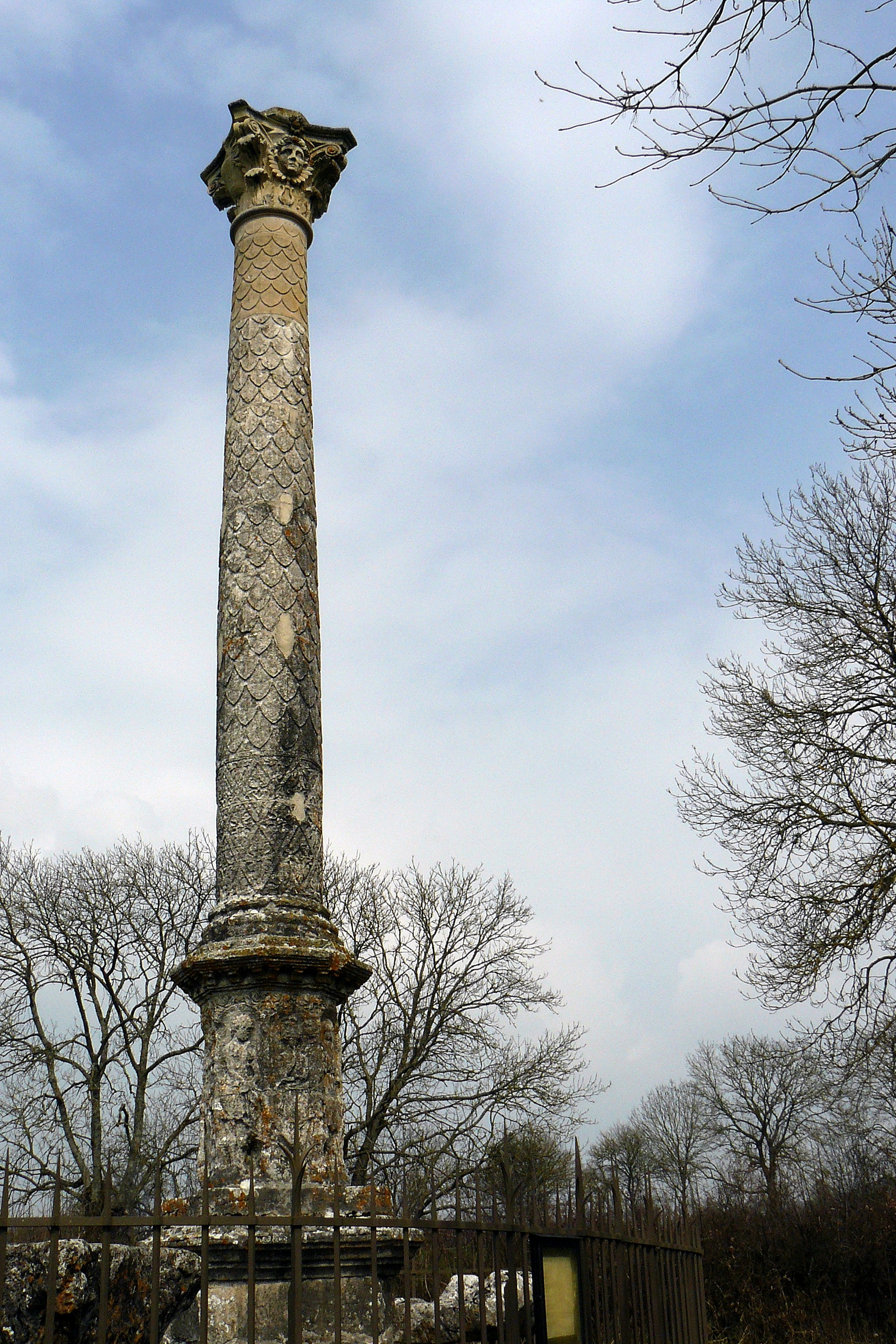
- Roman column in Cussy
- Location of Cussy-la-Colonne
- Location within France Location within Bourgogne-Franche-Comté
- Coordinates: 47°02′30″N 4°38′31″E
- Country: France
- Region: Bourgogne-Franche-Comté
- Department: Côte-d'Or
- Arrondissement: Beaune
- Canton: Arnay-le-Duc

Government
  - Mayor (2020–2026): Nathalie Voidey Terrand
- Area^{1}: 6.09 km^{2} (2.35 sq mi)
- Elevation: 480 m (1,570 ft)
- Highest elevation: 563 m (1,847 ft)
- Lowest elevation: 428 m (1,404 ft)
- Population (2023): 46
  - Density: 7.6/km^{2} (20/sq mi)
- Time zone: UTC+01:00 (CET)
  - Summer (DST): UTC+02:00 (CEST)
- INSEE/Postal code: 21221 /21360
- ^{1} French Land Register data, which excludes lakes, ponds, glaciers > 1 km^{2} (0.386 sq mi or 247 acres) and river estuaries.

Cussy-la-Colonne (French pronunciation: [kysi la kɔlɔn]) is a commune in the Côte-d'Or department in eastern France.

== Population ==
Historical population
| Year | Pop. | ±% p.a. |
|---|---|---|
| 1968 | 43 | — |
| 1975 | 43 | +0.00% |
| 1982 | 52 | +2.75% |
| 1990 | 47 | −1.26% |
| 1999 | 41 | −1.51% |
| 2007 | 53 | +3.26% |
| 2012 | 54 | +0.37% |
| 2017 | 42 | −4.90% |
| 2023 | 46 | +1.53% |
Source: INSEE

== See also ==
- Communes of the Côte-d'Or department
