= Lusigny-sur-Ouche =

- Commune
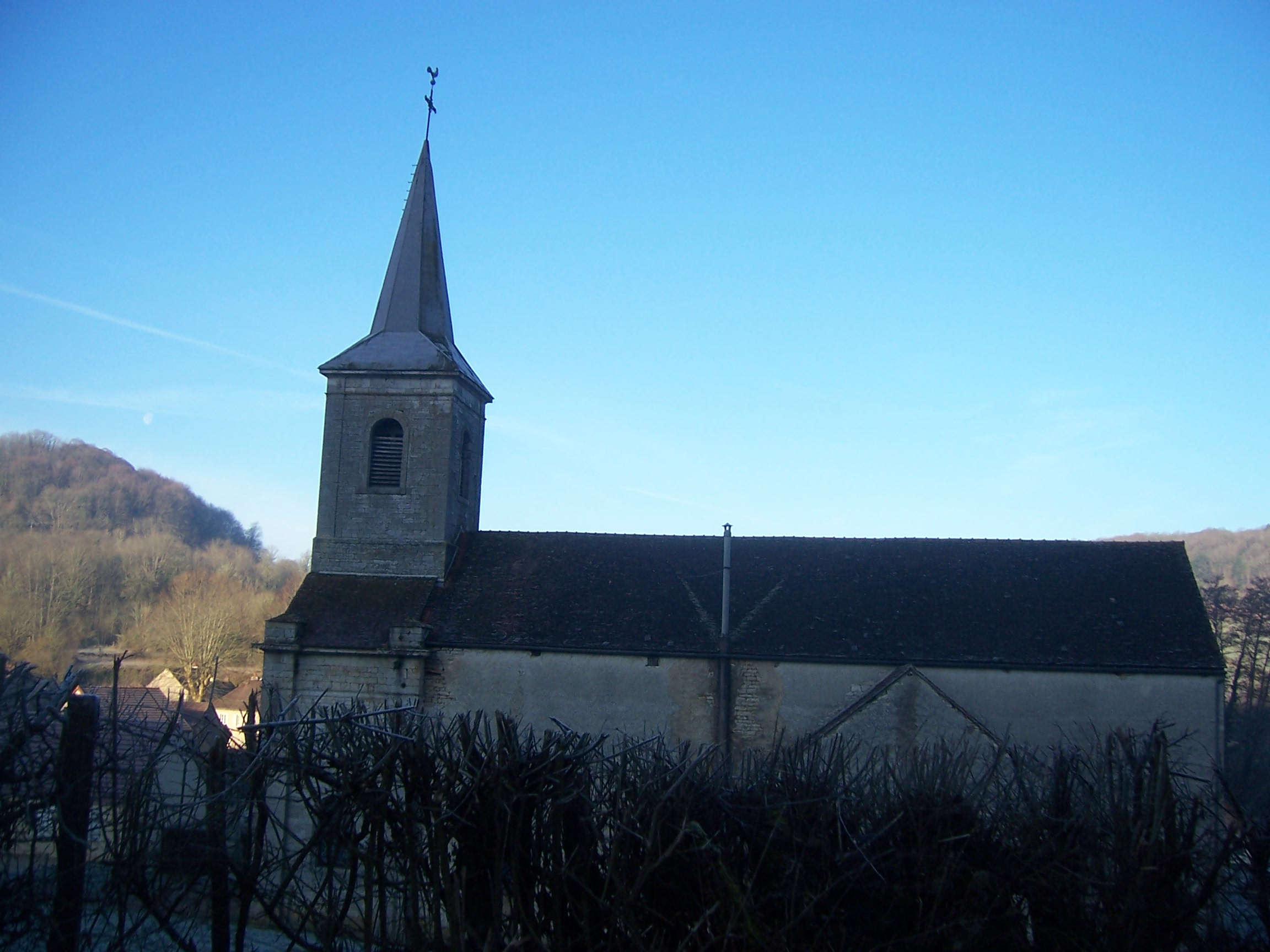
- The church in Lusigny-sur-Ouche
- Location of Lusigny-sur-Ouche
- Location within France Location within Bourgogne-Franche-Comté
- Coordinates: 47°05′31″N 4°40′27″E
- Country: France
- Region: Bourgogne-Franche-Comté
- Department: Côte-d'Or
- Arrondissement: Beaune
- Canton: Arnay-le-Duc

Government
  - Mayor (2020–2026): Éric Béraud
- Area^{1}: 10.07 km^{2} (3.89 sq mi)
- Elevation: 379 m (1,243 ft)
- Highest elevation: 513 m (1,683 ft)
- Lowest elevation: 363 m (1,191 ft)
- Population (2023): 115
  - Density: 11.4/km^{2} (29.6/sq mi)
- Time zone: UTC+01:00 (CET)
  - Summer (DST): UTC+02:00 (CEST)
- INSEE/Postal code: 21360 /21360
- ^{1} French Land Register data, which excludes lakes, ponds, glaciers > 1 km^{2} (0.386 sq mi or 247 acres) and river estuaries.

Lusigny-sur-Ouche (French pronunciation: [lyziɲi syʁ uʃ]) is a commune in the Côte-d'Or department in the region of Bourgogne-Franche-Comté in eastern France.

== Population ==
Historical population
Year	Pop.	±% p.a.
1968	120	—
1975	101	−2.43%
1982	94	−1.02%
1990	93	−0.13%
1999	74	−2.51%
2007	80	+0.98%
2012	113	+7.15%
2017	111	−0.36%
2023	115	+0.59%
Source: INSEE

== See also ==
- Communes of the Côte-d'Or department
