= Culètre =

- Commune
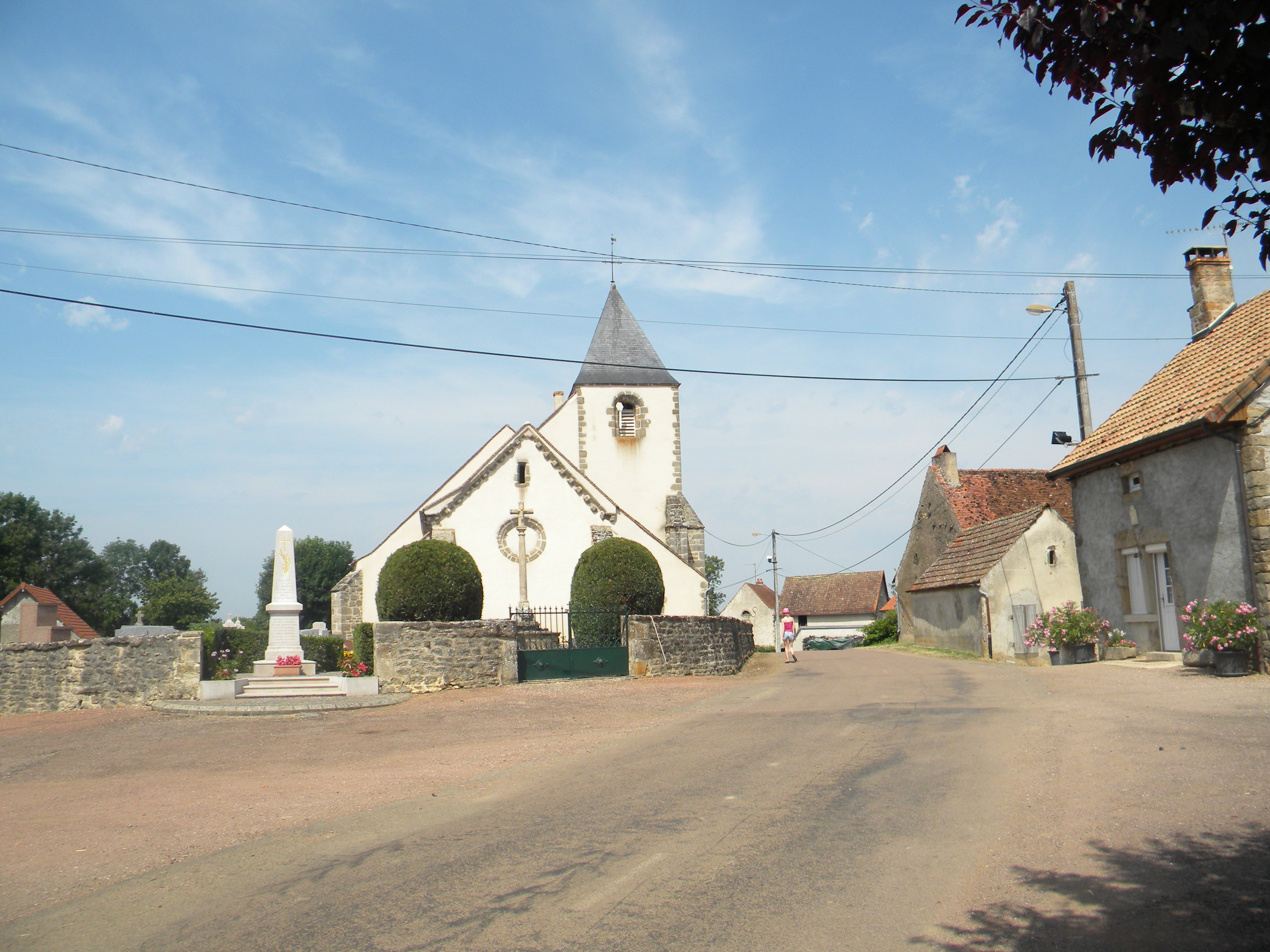
- The church in Culètre
- Location of Culètre
- Location within France Location within Bourgogne-Franche-Comté
- Coordinates: 47°08′52″N 4°34′37″E
- Country: France
- Region: Bourgogne-Franche-Comté
- Department: Côte-d'Or
- Arrondissement: Beaune
- Canton: Arnay-le-Duc
- Intercommunality: Pays Arnay Liernais

Government
  - Mayor (2020–2026): Elisabeth Jeannin
- Area^{1}: 5.59 km^{2} (2.16 sq mi)
- Highest elevation: 476 m (1,562 ft)
- Lowest elevation: 384 m (1,260 ft)
- Population (2023): 93
  - Density: 17/km^{2} (43/sq mi)
- Time zone: UTC+01:00 (CET)
  - Summer (DST): UTC+02:00 (CEST)
- INSEE/Postal code: 21216 /21230
- ^{1} French Land Register data, which excludes lakes, ponds, glaciers > 1 km^{2} (0.386 sq mi or 247 acres) and river estuaries.

Culètre (French pronunciation: [kylɛtʁ]) is a commune in the Côte-d'Or department in eastern France.

== Population ==
Historical population
| Year | Pop. | ±% p.a. |
|---|---|---|
| 1968 | 108 | — |
| 1975 | 85 | −3.36% |
| 1982 | 70 | −2.74% |
| 1990 | 67 | −0.55% |
| 1999 | 51 | −2.99% |
| 2007 | 71 | +4.22% |
| 2012 | 86 | +3.91% |
| 2017 | 99 | +2.86% |
| 2023 | 93 | −1.04% |
Source: INSEE

== See also ==
- Communes of the Côte-d'Or department
