= Colombier, Côte-d'Or =

Colombier
- Commune
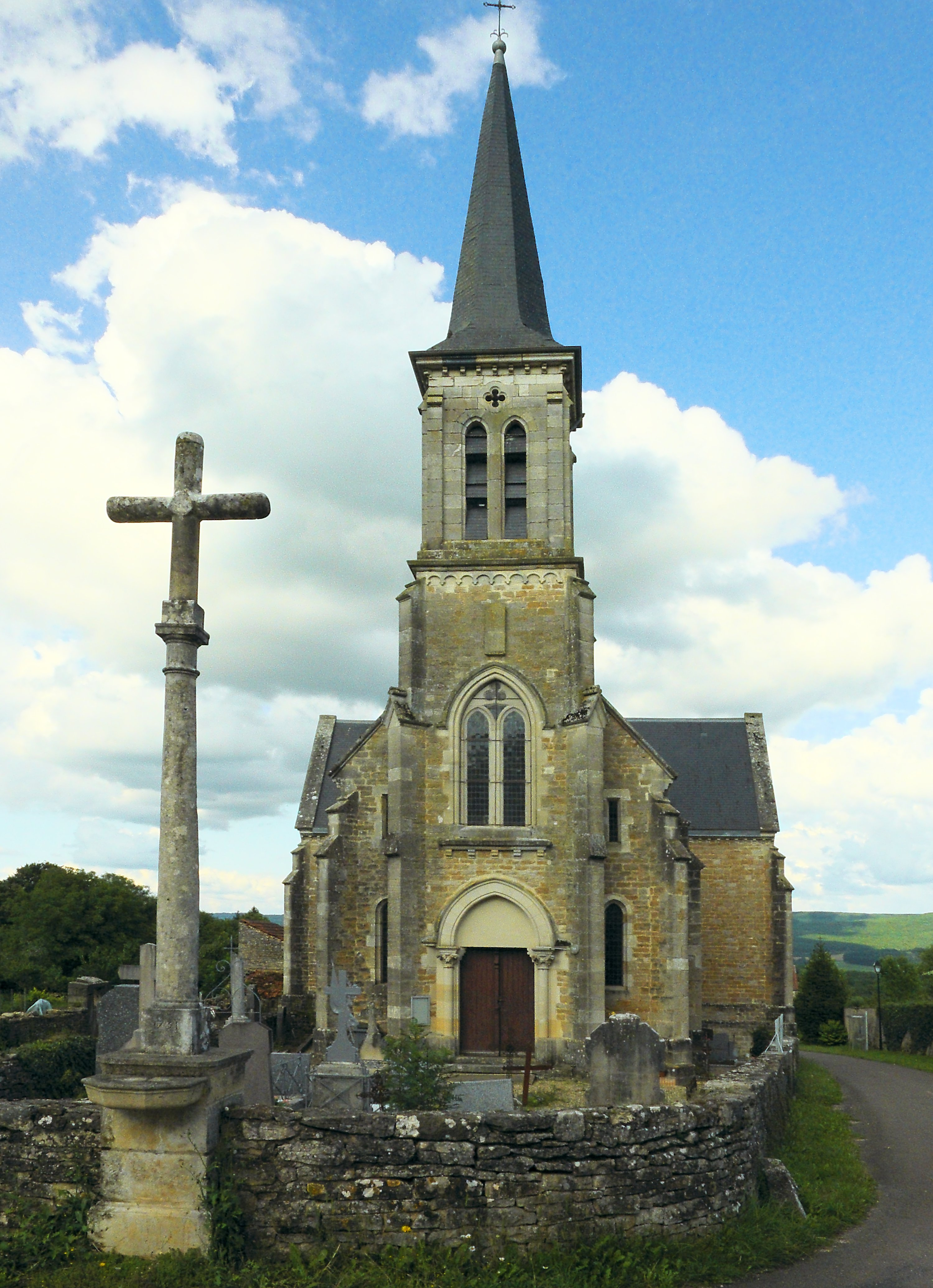
- The church in Colombier

- Coat of arms
- Location of Colombier
- Location within France Location within Bourgogne-Franche-Comté
- Coordinates: 47°10′07″N 4°40′29″E
- Country: France
- Region: Bourgogne-Franche-Comté
- Department: Côte-d'Or
- Arrondissement: Beaune
- Canton: Arnay-le-Duc

Government
  - Mayor (2020–2026): Françoise Maufay
- Area^{1}: 3.9 km^{2} (1.5 sq mi)
- Elevation: 520 m (1,710 ft)
- Highest elevation: 544 m (1,785 ft)
- Lowest elevation: 325 m (1,066 ft)
- Population (2023): 66
  - Density: 17/km^{2} (44/sq mi)
- Time zone: UTC+01:00 (CET)
  - Summer (DST): UTC+02:00 (CEST)
- INSEE/Postal code: 21184 /21360
- ^{1} French Land Register data, which excludes lakes, ponds, glaciers > 1 km^{2} (0.386 sq mi or 247 acres) and river estuaries.

Colombier (French pronunciation: [kɔlɔ̃bje]) is a commune in the Côte-d'Or department in eastern France.

== Population ==
Historical population
Year	Pop.	±% p.a.
1968	64	—
1975	44	−5.21%
1982	45	+0.32%
1990	45	+0.00%
1999	51	+1.40%
2007	53	+0.48%
2012	47	−2.37%
2017	64	+6.37%
2023	66	+0.51%
Source: INSEE

== See also ==
- Communes of the Côte-d'Or department
