= Mont-Saint-Jean, Côte-d'Or =

Mont-Saint-Jean
- Commune
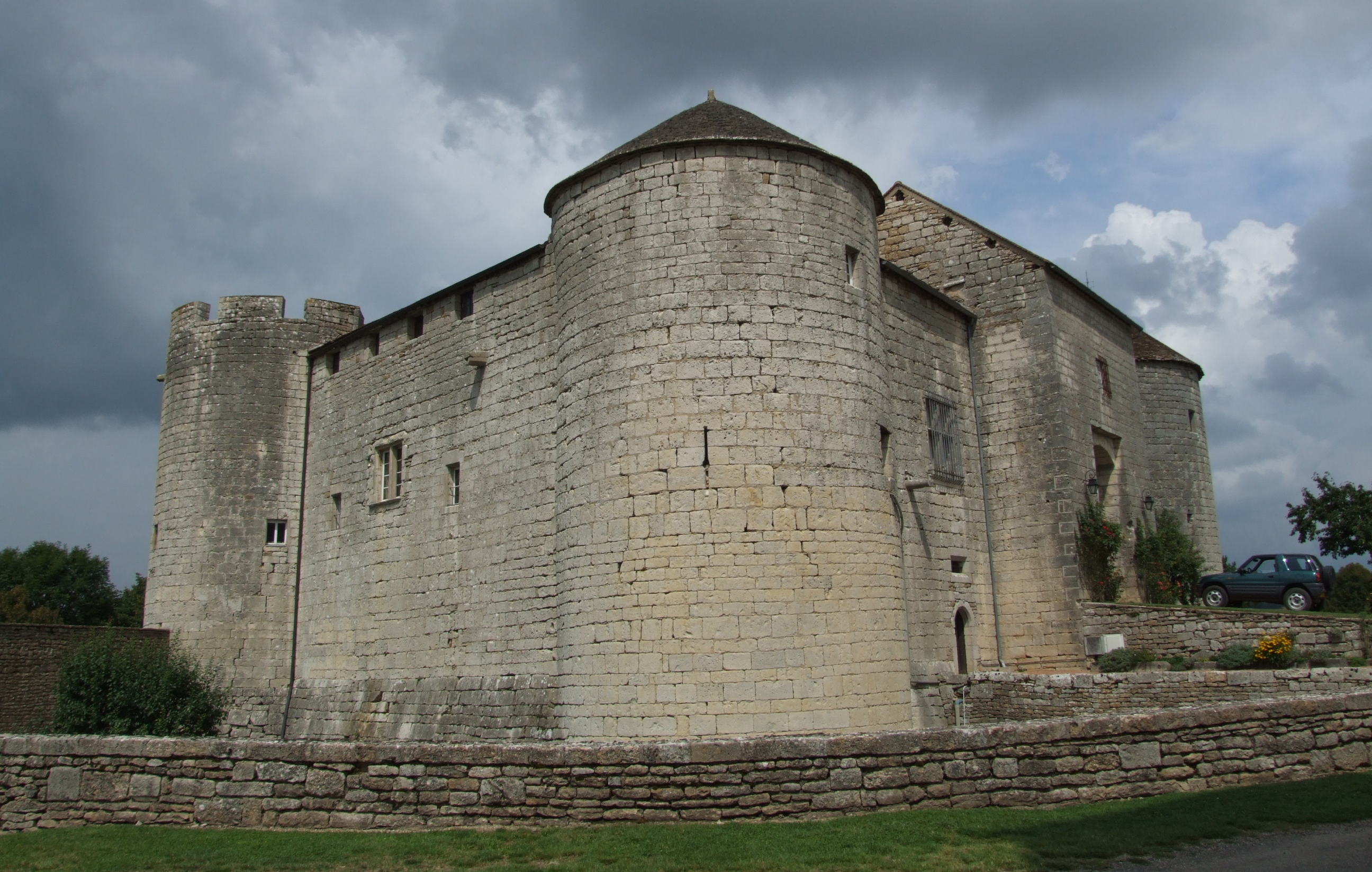
- Chateau

- Coat of arms
- Location of Mont-Saint-Jean
- Location within France Location within Bourgogne-Franche-Comté
- Coordinates: 47°17′36″N 4°24′10″E
- Country: France
- Region: Bourgogne-Franche-Comté
- Department: Côte-d'Or
- Arrondissement: Beaune
- Canton: Arnay-le-Duc

Government
  - Mayor (2020–2026): Patrick Mercuzot
- Area^{1}: 27.66 km^{2} (10.68 sq mi)
- Elevation: 478 m (1,568 ft)
- Highest elevation: 577 m (1,893 ft)
- Lowest elevation: 355 m (1,165 ft)
- Population (2023): 267
  - Density: 9.65/km^{2} (25.0/sq mi)
- Time zone: UTC+01:00 (CET)
  - Summer (DST): UTC+02:00 (CEST)
- INSEE/Postal code: 21441 /21320
- ^{1} French Land Register data, which excludes lakes, ponds, glaciers > 1 km^{2} (0.386 sq mi or 247 acres) and river estuaries.

Mont-Saint-Jean (French pronunciation: [mɔ̃ sɛ̃ ʒɑ̃]) is a commune in the Côte-d'Or department in eastern France.

== Population ==
Historical population
Year	Pop.	±% p.a.
1968	335	—
1975	283	−2.38%
1982	271	−0.62%
1990	270	−0.05%
1999	262	−0.33%
2007	255	−0.34%
2012	254	−0.08%
2017	241	−1.05%
2023	267	+1.72%
Source: INSEE

== See also ==
- Communes of the Côte-d'Or department
