= Saint-Pierre-en-Vaux =

- Commune
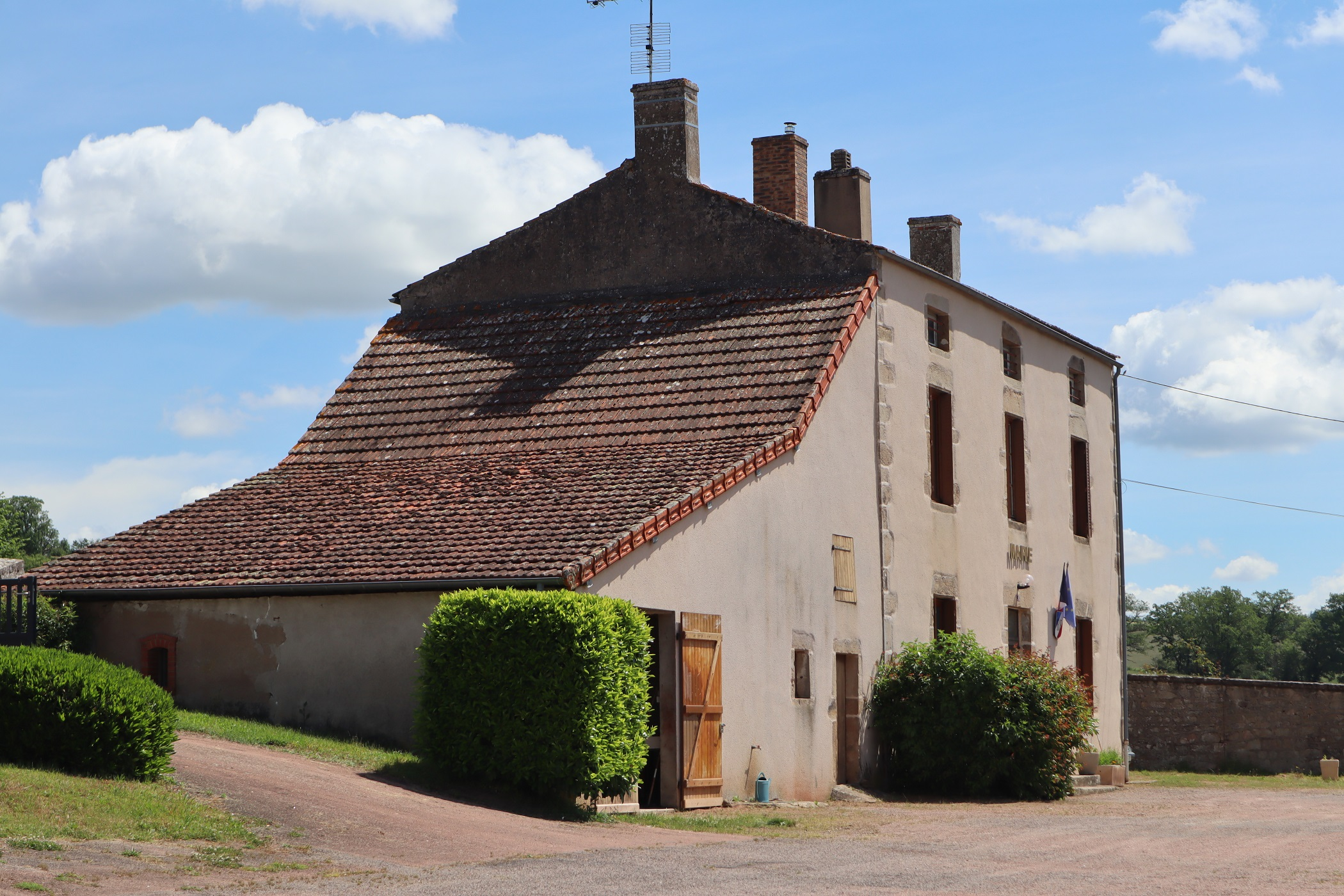
- Town hall
- Location of Saint-Pierre-en-Vaux
- Location within France Location within Bourgogne-Franche-Comté
- Coordinates: 47°03′27″N 4°31′37″E
- Country: France
- Region: Bourgogne-Franche-Comté
- Department: Côte-d'Or
- Arrondissement: Beaune
- Canton: Arnay-le-Duc

Government
  - Mayor (2020–2026): Christian Nief
- Area^{1}: 10.86 km^{2} (4.19 sq mi)
- Elevation: 360 m (1,180 ft)
- Highest elevation: 438 m (1,437 ft)
- Lowest elevation: 331 m (1,086 ft)
- Population (2023): 138
  - Density: 12.7/km^{2} (32.9/sq mi)
- Demonym: Saint-Peter-Vallois
- Time zone: UTC+01:00 (CET)
  - Summer (DST): UTC+02:00 (CEST)
- INSEE/Postal code: 21566 /21230
- ^{1} French Land Register data, which excludes lakes, ponds, glaciers > 1 km^{2} (0.386 sq mi or 247 acres) and river estuaries.

Saint-Pierre-en-Vaux (French pronunciation: [sɛ̃ pjɛʁ ɑ̃ vo]) is a commune in the Côte-d'Or department in eastern France.

== Population ==
Historical population
Year	Pop.	±% p.a.
1968	189	—
1975	199	+0.74%
1982	170	−2.22%
1990	155	−1.15%
1999	140	−1.12%
2007	132	−0.73%
2012	133	+0.15%
2017	148	+2.16%
2023	138	−1.16%
Source: INSEE

== See also ==
- Communes of the Côte-d'Or department
