= Semarey =

- Commune
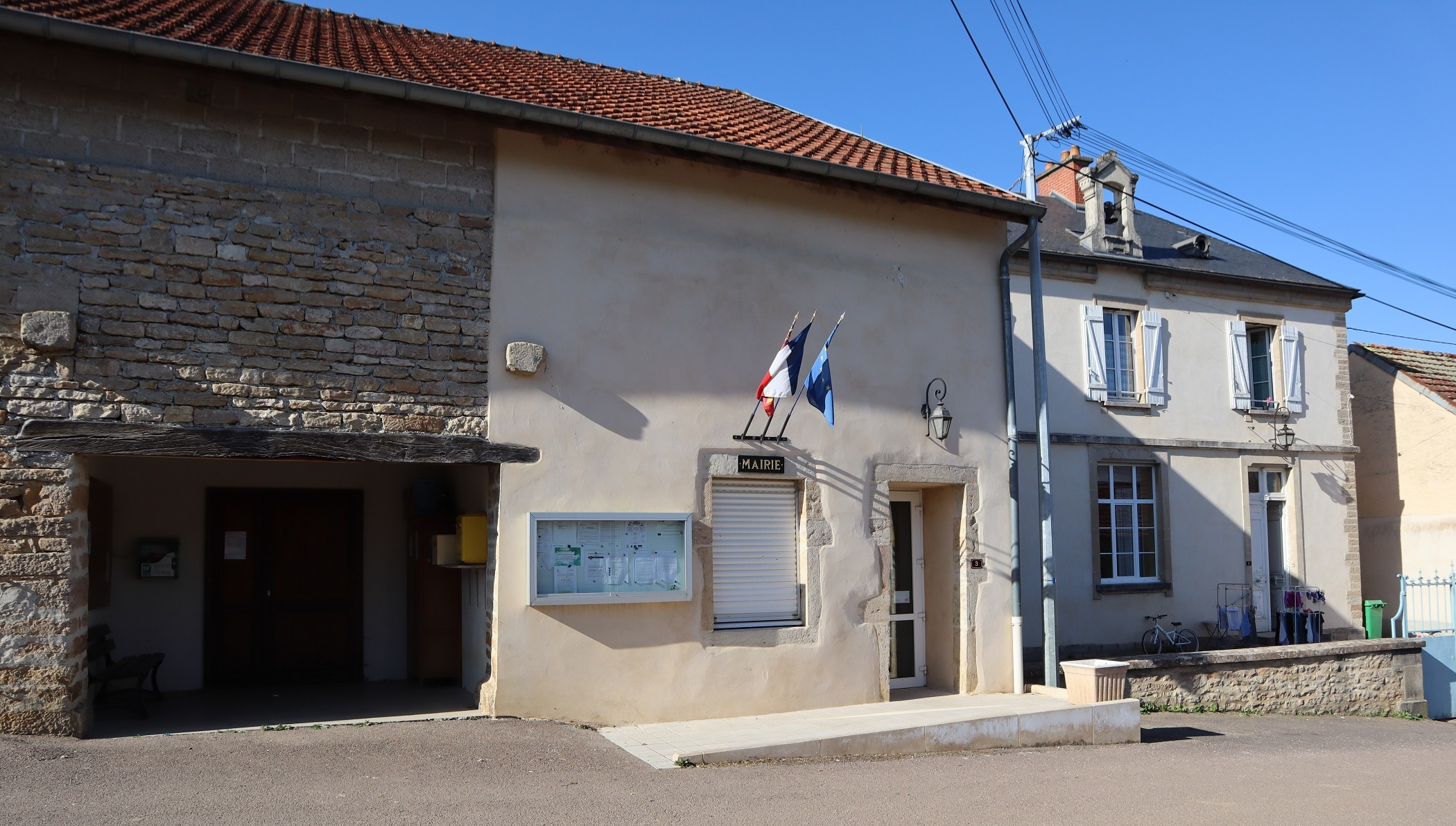
- Town hall

- Coat of arms
- Location of Semarey
- Location within France Location within Bourgogne-Franche-Comté
- Coordinates: 47°16′08″N 4°38′04″E
- Country: France
- Region: Bourgogne-Franche-Comté
- Department: Côte-d'Or
- Arrondissement: Beaune
- Canton: Arnay-le-Duc

Government
  - Mayor (2020–2026): Fabrice Baudot
- Area^{1}: 7.32 km^{2} (2.83 sq mi)
- Elevation: 382 m (1,253 ft)
- Highest elevation: 548 m (1,798 ft)
- Lowest elevation: 374 m (1,227 ft)
- Population (2023): 133
  - Density: 18.2/km^{2} (47.1/sq mi)
- Time zone: UTC+01:00 (CET)
  - Summer (DST): UTC+02:00 (CEST)
- INSEE/Postal code: 21600 /21320
- ^{1} French Land Register data, which excludes lakes, ponds, glaciers > 1 km^{2} (0.386 sq mi or 247 acres) and river estuaries.

Semarey (French pronunciation: [səmaʁɛ]) is a commune in the Côte-d'Or department in eastern France.

== Population ==
Historical population
Year	Pop.	±% p.a.
1968	97	—
1975	105	+1.14%
1982	94	−1.57%
1990	112	+2.21%
1999	111	−0.10%
2007	109	−0.23%
2012	119	+1.77%
2017	122	+0.50%
2023	133	+1.45%
Source: INSEE

== See also ==
- Communes of the Côte-d'Or department
