= Thoisy-le-Désert =

- Commune
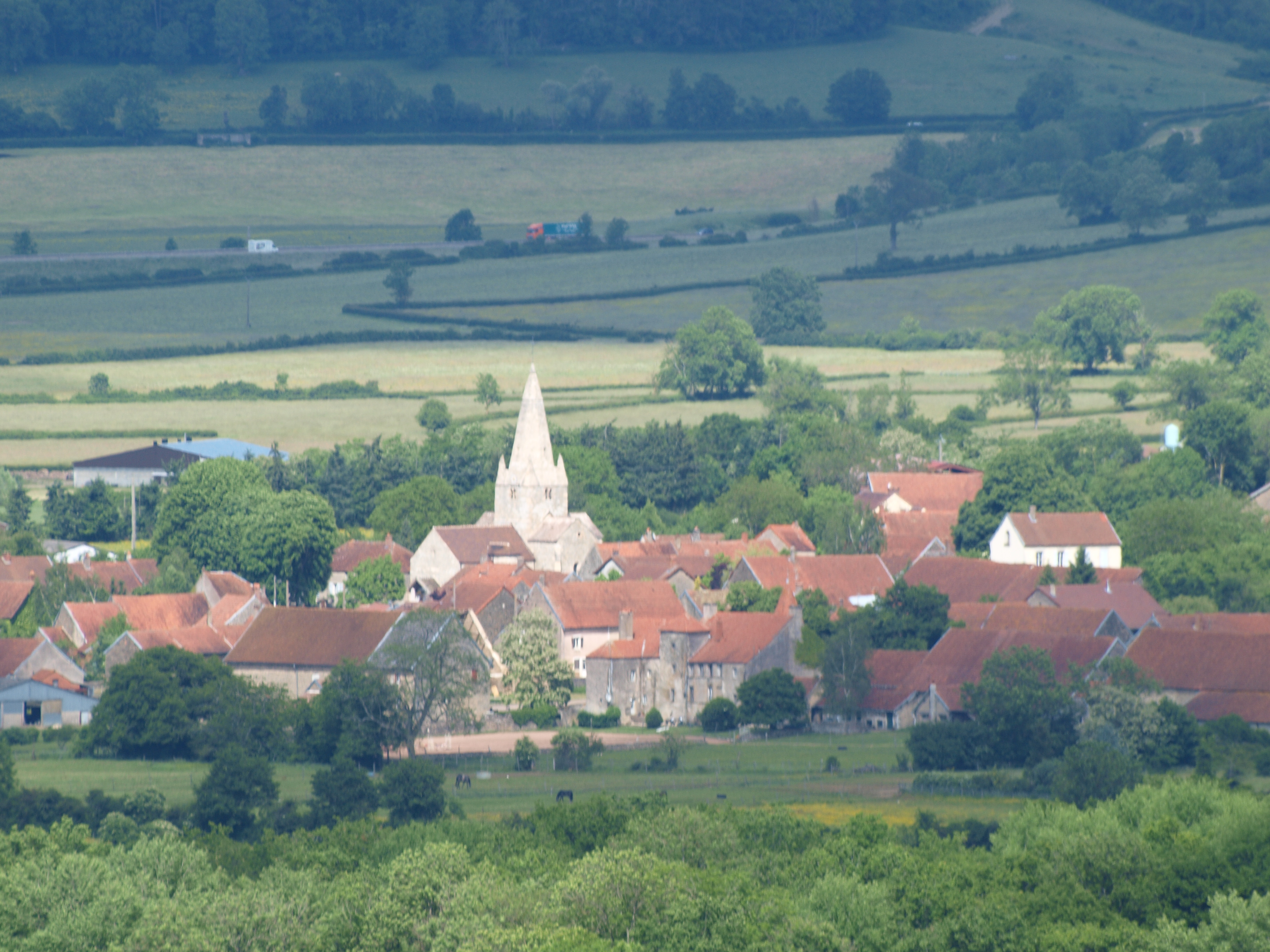
- A general view of Thoisy-le-Désert
- Location of Thoisy-le-Désert
- Location within France Location within Bourgogne-Franche-Comté
- Coordinates: 47°14′51″N 4°31′32″E
- Country: France
- Region: Bourgogne-Franche-Comté
- Department: Côte-d'Or
- Arrondissement: Beaune
- Canton: Arnay-le-Duc

Government
  - Mayor (2020–2026): André Renard
- Area^{1}: 13.06 km^{2} (5.04 sq mi)
- Elevation: 380 m (1,250 ft)
- Highest elevation: 456 m (1,496 ft)
- Lowest elevation: 359 m (1,178 ft)
- Population (2023): 217
  - Density: 16.6/km^{2} (43.0/sq mi)
- Time zone: UTC+01:00 (CET)
  - Summer (DST): UTC+02:00 (CEST)
- INSEE/Postal code: 21630 /21320
- ^{1} French Land Register data, which excludes lakes, ponds, glaciers > 1 km^{2} (0.386 sq mi or 247 acres) and river estuaries.

Thoisy-le-Désert (French pronunciation: [twazi lə dezɛʁ]) is a commune in the Côte-d'Or department in eastern France.

== Population ==
Historical population
| Year | Pop. | ±% p.a. |
|---|---|---|
| 1968 | 193 | — |
| 1975 | 157 | −2.91% |
| 1982 | 149 | −0.74% |
| 1990 | 147 | −0.17% |
| 1999 | 163 | +1.15% |
| 2007 | 191 | +2.00% |
| 2012 | 209 | +1.82% |
| 2017 | 207 | −0.19% |
| 2023 | 217 | +0.79% |
Source: INSEE

== See also ==
- Communes of the Côte-d'Or department
