= Crugey =

- Commune
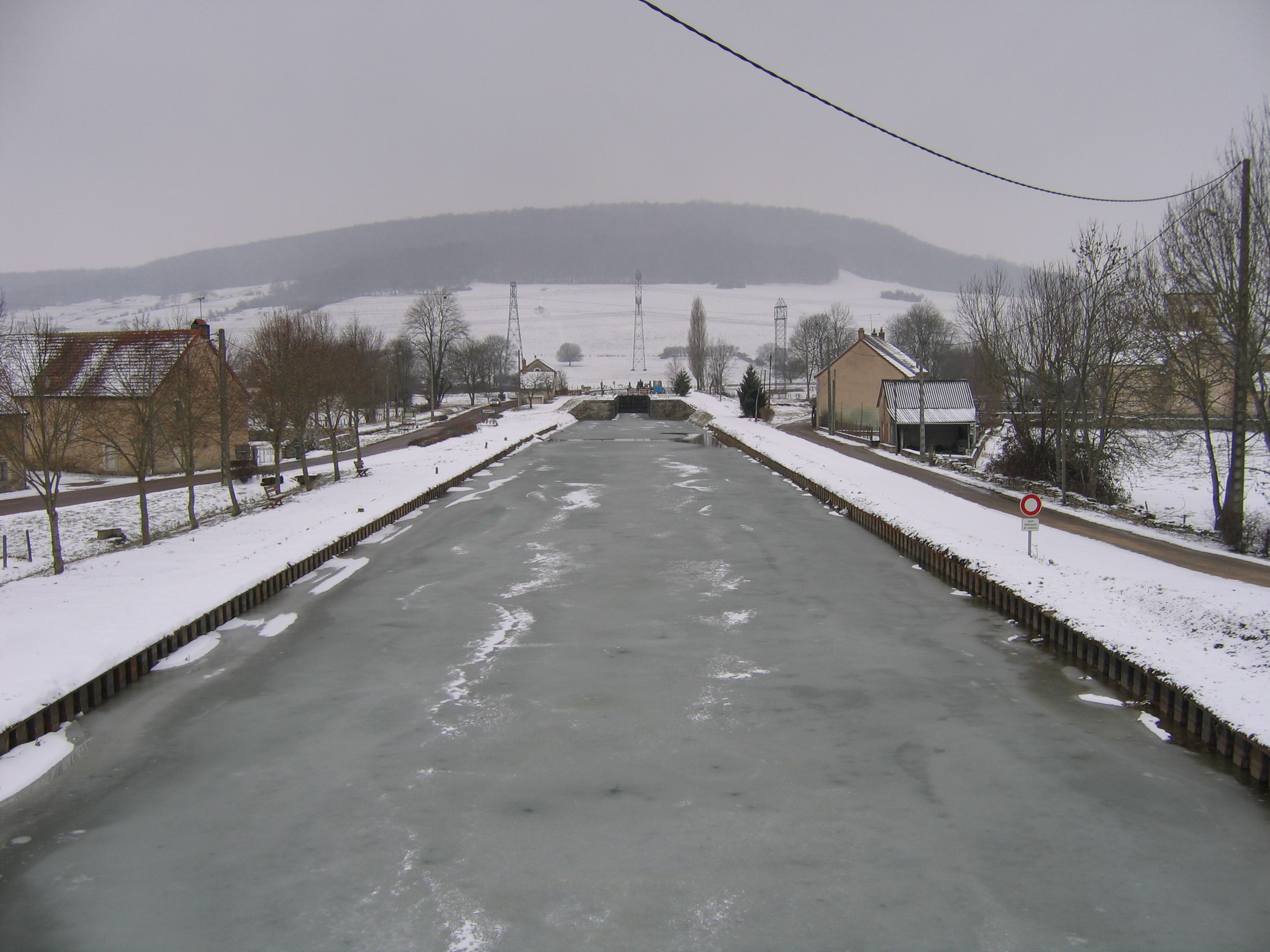
- Lock on the Canal de Bourgogne
- Location of Crugey
- Location within France Location within Bourgogne-Franche-Comté
- Coordinates: 47°11′07″N 4°40′29″E
- Country: France
- Region: Bourgogne-Franche-Comté
- Department: Côte-d'Or
- Arrondissement: Beaune
- Canton: Arnay-le-Duc

Government
  - Mayor (2020–2026): Guy Dupuis
- Area^{1}: 6.3 km^{2} (2.4 sq mi)
- Elevation: 337 m (1,106 ft)
- Highest elevation: 490 m (1,610 ft)
- Lowest elevation: 322 m (1,056 ft)
- Population (2023): 166
  - Density: 26/km^{2} (68/sq mi)
- Time zone: UTC+01:00 (CET)
  - Summer (DST): UTC+02:00 (CEST)
- INSEE/Postal code: 21214 /21360
- ^{1} French Land Register data, which excludes lakes, ponds, glaciers > 1 km^{2} (0.386 sq mi or 247 acres) and river estuaries.

Crugey (French pronunciation: [kʁyʒɛ]) is a commune in the Côte-d'Or department in eastern France.

== Population ==
Historical population
Year	Pop.	±% p.a.
1968	290	—
1975	268	−1.12%
1982	222	−2.65%
1990	188	−2.06%
1999	213	+1.40%
2007	173	−2.57%
2012	189	+1.78%
2017	175	−1.53%
2023	166	−0.88%
Source: INSEE

== See also ==
- Communes of the Côte-d'Or department
