= Arrondissement of Beaune =

Coordinates: 47°01′30″N 4°50′23″E

Beaune
- Arrondissement
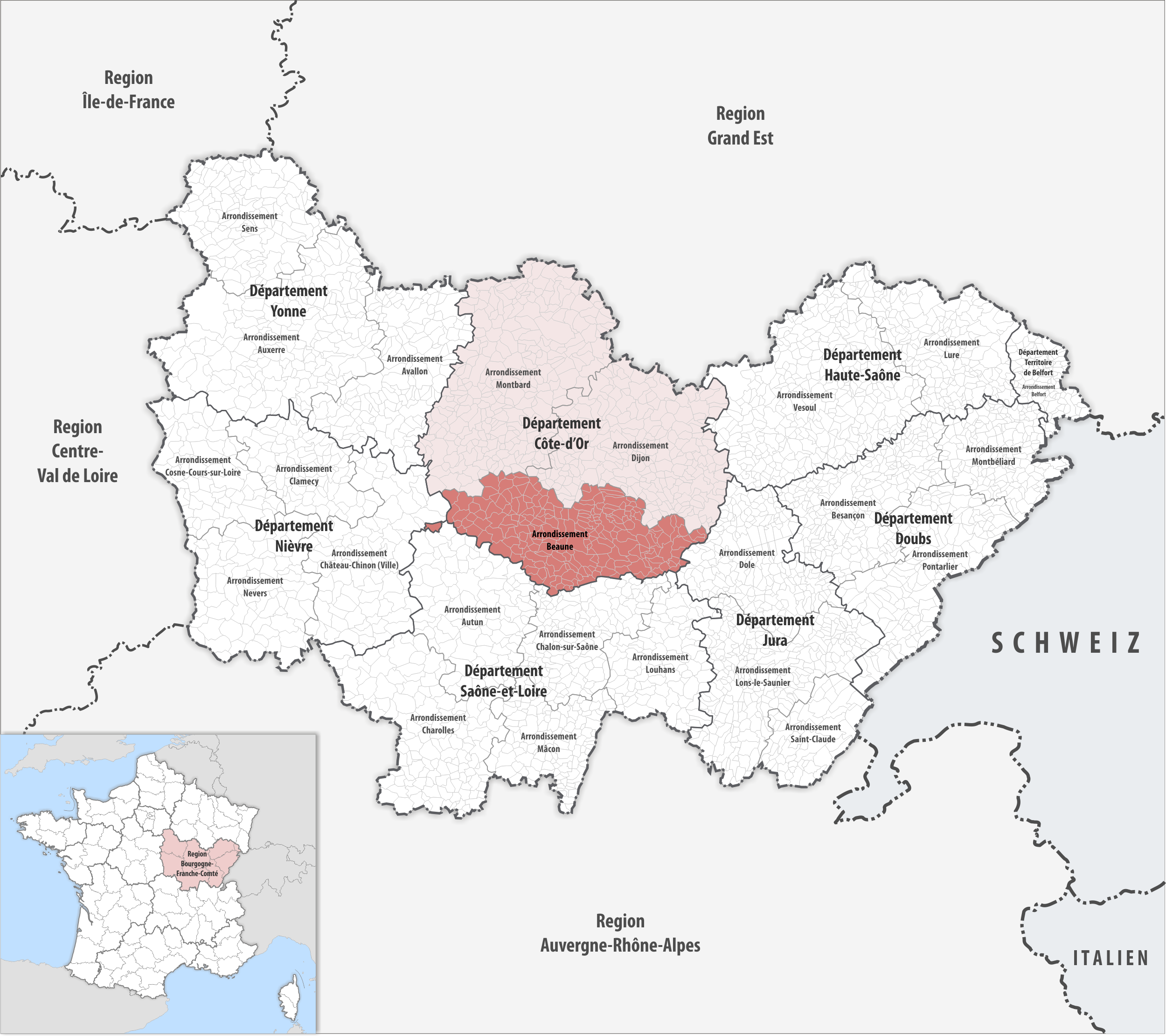
- Location within the region Bourgogne-Franche-Comté
- Country: France
- Region: Bourgogne-Franche-Comté
- Department: Côte-d'Or
- No. of communes: {{{nbcomm}}}
- Area: 2,359.1 km^{2} (910.9 sq mi)
- Population (2023): 109,203
  - Density: 46.290/km^{2} (119.89/sq mi)
- INSEE code: 211

The arrondissement of Beaune is an arrondissement of France in the Côte-d'Or department in the Bourgogne-Franche-Comté region. It has 222 communes. Its population is 109,089 (2021), and its area is 2,359.1 km^{2} (910.9 sq mi).

== Composition ==
The communes of the arrondissement of Beaune, and their INSEE codes, are:

1. Agencourt (21001)
2. Allerey (21009)
3. Aloxe-Corton (21010)
4. Antheuil (21014)
5. Antigny-la-Ville (21015)
6. Arcenant (21017)
7. Arconcey (21020)
8. Argilly (21022)
9. Arnay-le-Duc (21023)
10. Aubaine (21030)
11. Aubigny-en-Plaine (21031)
12. Aubigny-la-Ronce (21032)
13. Auvillars-sur-Saône (21035)
14. Auxant (21036)
15. Auxey-Duresses (21037)
16. Bagnot (21042)
17. Bard-le-Régulier (21046)
18. Barges (21048)
19. Baubigny (21050)
20. Beaune (21054)
21. Bellenot-sous-Pouilly (21062)
22. Bessey-en-Chaume (21065)
23. Bessey-la-Cour (21066)
24. Beurey-Bauguay (21068)
25. Bévy (21070)
26. Blancey (21082)
27. Blanot (21083)
28. Bligny-lès-Beaune (21086)
29. Bligny-sur-Ouche (21087)
30. Boncourt-le-Bois (21088)
31. Bonnencontre (21089)
32. Bouhey (21091)
33. Bouilland (21092)
34. Bousselange (21095)
35. Bouze-lès-Beaune (21099)
36. Brazey-en-Morvan (21102)
37. Brazey-en-Plaine (21103)
38. Brochon (21110)
39. Broin (21112)
40. Broindon (21113)
41. La Bussière-sur-Ouche (21120)
42. Censerey (21124)
43. Chailly-sur-Armançon (21128)
44. Chamblanc (21131)
45. Chambœuf (21132)
46. Chambolle-Musigny (21133)
47. Champignolles (21140)
48. Charrey-sur-Saône (21148)
49. Chassagne-Montrachet (21150)
50. Châteauneuf (21152)
51. Châtellenot (21153)
52. Chaudenay-la-Ville (21155)
53. Chaudenay-le-Château (21156)
54. Chaux (21162)
55. Chazilly (21164)
56. Chevannes (21169)
57. Chevigny-en-Valière (21170)
58. Chivres (21172)
59. Chorey-les-Beaune (21173)
60. Civry-en-Montagne (21176)
61. Clomot (21181)
62. Collonges-lès-Bévy (21182)
63. Colombier (21184)
64. Combertault (21185)
65. Comblanchien (21186)
66. Commarin (21187)
67. Corberon (21189)
68. Corcelles-les-Arts (21190)
69. Corcelles-lès-Cîteaux (21191)
70. Corgengoux (21193)
71. Corgoloin (21194)
72. Cormot-Vauchignon (21195)
73. Corpeau (21196)
74. Couchey (21200)
75. Créancey (21210)
76. Crugey (21214)
77. Culètre (21216)
78. Curley (21217)
79. Curtil-Vergy (21219)
80. Cussy-la-Colonne (21221)
81. Cussy-le-Châtel (21222)
82. Détain-et-Bruant (21228)
83. Diancey (21229)
84. Ébaty (21236)
85. Échenon (21239)
86. Échevronne (21241)
87. Écutigny (21243)
88. Éguilly (21244)
89. Épernay-sous-Gevrey (21246)
90. Esbarres (21249)
91. Essey (21251)
92. L'Étang-Vergy (21254)
93. Le Fête (21264)
94. Fixin (21265)
95. Flagey-Echézeaux (21267)
96. Foissy (21274)
97. Franxault (21285)
98. Fussey (21289)
99. Gerland (21294)
100. Gevrey-Chambertin (21295)
101. Gilly-lès-Cîteaux (21297)
102. Glanon (21301)
103. Grosbois-lès-Tichey (21311)
104. Jallanges (21322)
105. Jouey (21325)
106. Labergement-lès-Seurre (21332)
107. Labruyère (21333)
108. Lacanche (21334)
109. Ladoix-Serrigny (21606)
110. Lanthes (21340)
111. Laperrière-sur-Saône (21342)
112. Lechâtelet (21344)
113. Levernois (21347)
114. Liernais (21349)
115. Longecourt-lès-Culêtre (21354)
116. Losne (21356)
117. Lusigny-sur-Ouche (21360)
118. Maconge (21362)
119. Magnien (21363)
120. Magny-lès-Aubigny (21366)
121. Magny-lès-Villers (21368)
122. Maligny (21374)
123. Manlay (21375)
124. Marcheseuil (21379)
125. Marcilly-Ogny (21382)
126. Marey-lès-Fussey (21384)
127. Marigny-lès-Reullée (21387)
128. Martrois (21392)
129. Mavilly-Mandelot (21397)
130. Meilly-sur-Rouvres (21399)
131. Meloisey (21401)
132. Ménessaire (21403)
133. Merceuil (21405)
134. Messanges (21407)
135. Meuilley (21409)
136. Meursanges (21411)
137. Meursault (21412)
138. Mimeure (21414)
139. Molinot (21420)
140. Mont-Saint-Jean (21441)
141. Montagny-lès-Beaune (21423)
142. Montagny-lès-Seurre (21424)
143. Montceau-et-Écharnant (21427)
144. Monthelie (21428)
145. Montmain (21436)
146. Montot (21440)
147. Morey-Saint-Denis (21442)
148. Musigny (21447)
149. Nantoux (21450)
150. Noiron-sous-Gevrey (21458)
151. Nolay (21461)
152. Nuits-Saint-Georges (21464)
153. Pagny-la-Ville (21474)
154. Pagny-le-Château (21475)
155. Painblanc (21476)
156. Pernand-Vergelesses (21480)
157. Pommard (21492)
158. Pouilly-en-Auxois (21501)
159. Pouilly-sur-Saône (21502)
160. Premeaux-Prissey (21506)
161. Puligny-Montrachet (21512)
162. Quincey (21517)
163. Reulle-Vergy (21523)
164. La Rochepot (21527)
165. Rouvres-sous-Meilly (21533)
166. Ruffey-lès-Beaune (21534)
167. Saint-Aubin (21541)
168. Saint-Bernard (21542)
169. Sainte-Marie-la-Blanche (21558)
170. Sainte-Sabine (21570)
171. Saint-Jean-de-Losne (21554)
172. Saint-Martin-de-la-Mer (21560)
173. Saint-Nicolas-lès-Cîteaux (21564)
174. Saint-Philibert (21565)
175. Saint-Pierre-en-Vaux (21566)
176. Saint-Prix-lès-Arnay (21567)
177. Saint-Romain (21569)
178. Saint-Seine-en-Bâche (21572)
179. Saint-Symphorien-sur-Saône (21575)
180. Saint-Usage (21577)
181. Samerey (21581)
182. Santenay (21582)
183. Santosse (21583)
184. Saulon-la-Chapelle (21585)
185. Saulon-la-Rue (21586)
186. Saussey (21588)
187. Savigny-lès-Beaune (21590)
188. Savilly (21593)
189. Savouges (21596)
190. Segrois (21597)
191. Semarey (21600)
192. Semezanges (21601)
193. Seurre (21607)
194. Sussey (21615)
195. Tailly (21616)
196. Ternant (21625)
197. Thoisy-le-Désert (21630)
198. Thomirey (21631)
199. Thorey-sur-Ouche (21634)
200. Thury (21636)
201. Tichey (21637)
202. Trouhans (21645)
203. Trugny (21647)
204. Urcy (21650)
205. Valforêt (21178)
206. Val-Mont (21327)
207. Vandenesse-en-Auxois (21652)
208. Veilly (21660)
209. Veuvey-sur-Ouche (21673)
210. Vianges (21675)
211. Vic-des-Prés (21677)
212. Viévy (21683)
213. Vignoles (21684)
214. Villars-Fontaine (21688)
215. Villebichot (21691)
216. Villers-la-Faye (21698)
217. Villiers-en-Morvan (21703)
218. Villy-le-Moutier (21708)
219. Volnay (21712)
220. Vosne-Romanée (21714)
221. Voudenay (21715)
222. Vougeot (21716)

== History ==
The arrondissement of Beaune was created in 1800. At the January 2017 reorganisation of the arrondissements of Côte-d'Or, it gained 31 communes from the arrondissement of Dijon.

As a result of the reorganisation of the cantons of France which came into effect in 2015, the borders of the cantons are no longer related to the borders of the arrondissements. The cantons of the arrondissement of Beaune were, as of January 2015:

1. Arnay-le-Duc
2. Beaune-Nord
3. Beaune-Sud
4. Bligny-sur-Ouche
5. Liernais
6. Nolay
7. Nuits-Saint-Georges
8. Pouilly-en-Auxois
9. Saint-Jean-de-Losne
10. Seurre
