= Manlay =

- Commune
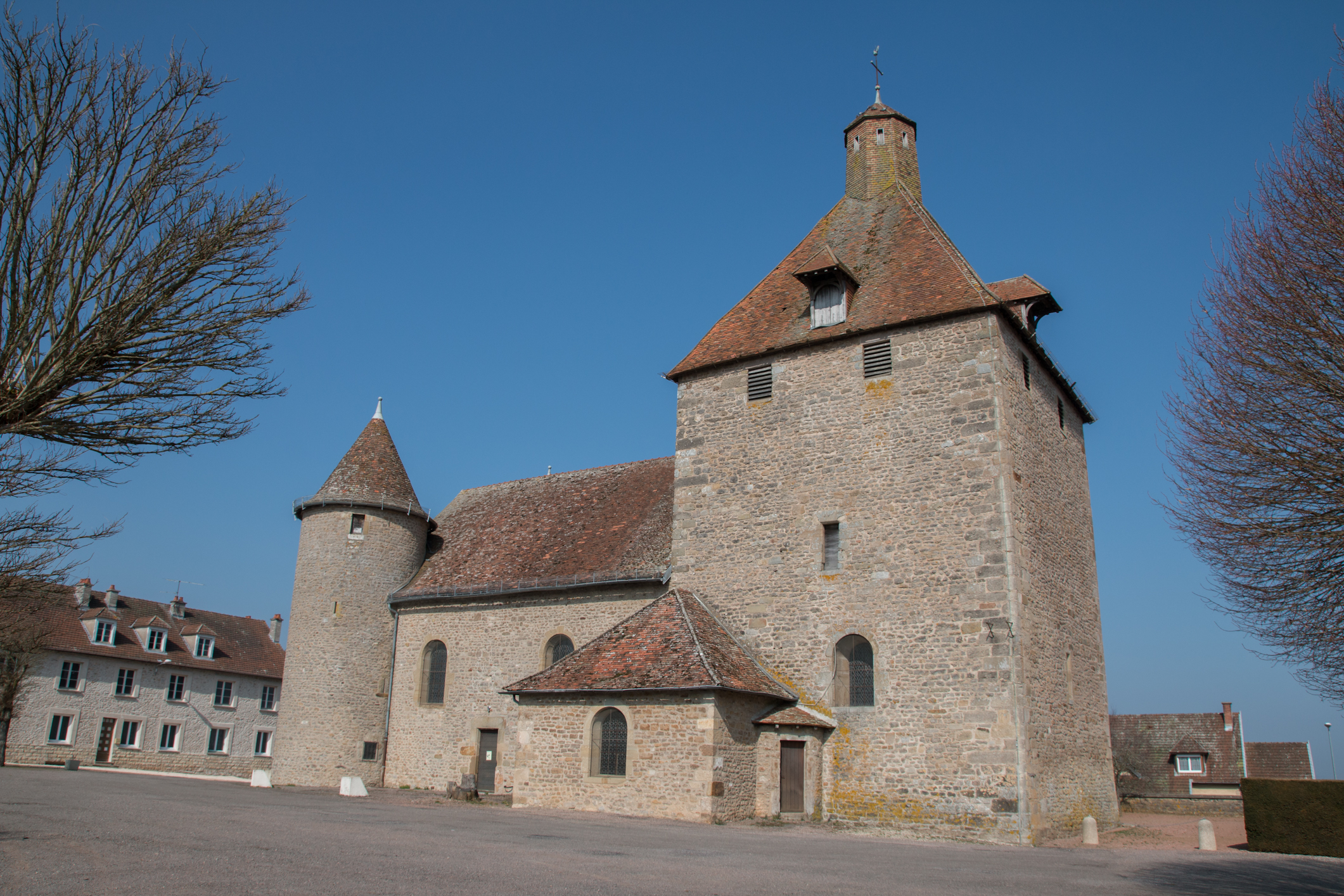
- The church in Manlay

- Coat of arms
- Location of Manlay
- Location within France Location within Bourgogne-Franche-Comté
- Coordinates: 47°07′47″N 4°20′32″E
- Country: France
- Region: Bourgogne-Franche-Comté
- Department: Côte-d'Or
- Arrondissement: Beaune
- Canton: Arnay-le-Duc
- Intercommunality: CC du Pays d'Arnay Liernais

Government
  - Mayor (2020–2026): Graziella Guerre
- Area^{1}: 19.03 km^{2} (7.35 sq mi)
- Elevation: 431 m (1,414 ft)
- Highest elevation: 550 m (1,800 ft)
- Lowest elevation: 340 m (1,120 ft)
- Population (2023): 199
  - Density: 10.5/km^{2} (27.1/sq mi)
- Demonym: Manléens
- Time zone: UTC+01:00 (CET)
  - Summer (DST): UTC+02:00 (CEST)
- INSEE/Postal code: 21375 /21430
- ^{1} French Land Register data, which excludes lakes, ponds, glaciers > 1 km^{2} (0.386 sq mi or 247 acres) and river estuaries.

Manlay (French pronunciation: [mɑ̃lɛ]) is a rural commune in the Côte-d'Or department in the Bourgogne-Franche-Comté region of central-east France. It is on the departmental border with Saône-et-Loire.

== History ==
On 31 July 1944, amid the Liberation of France during World War II and ahead of the general retreat of the occupying forces towards Germany, they bombed and burnt down the town as retaliation for French Resistance Maquis activities:

Of the 80 houses inhabited by 105 families, 62 were completely destroyed and 18 damaged. There was no longer any town hall, school, or post office.

== Population ==
Historical population
Year	Pop.	±% p.a.
1968	319	—
1975	286	−1.55%
1982	237	−2.65%
1990	221	−0.87%
1999	223	+0.10%
2007	204	−1.11%
2012	207	+0.29%
2017	170	−3.86%
2023	199	+2.66%
Source: INSEE

== See also ==
- Communes of the Côte-d'Or department
