= Éguilly =

- Commune
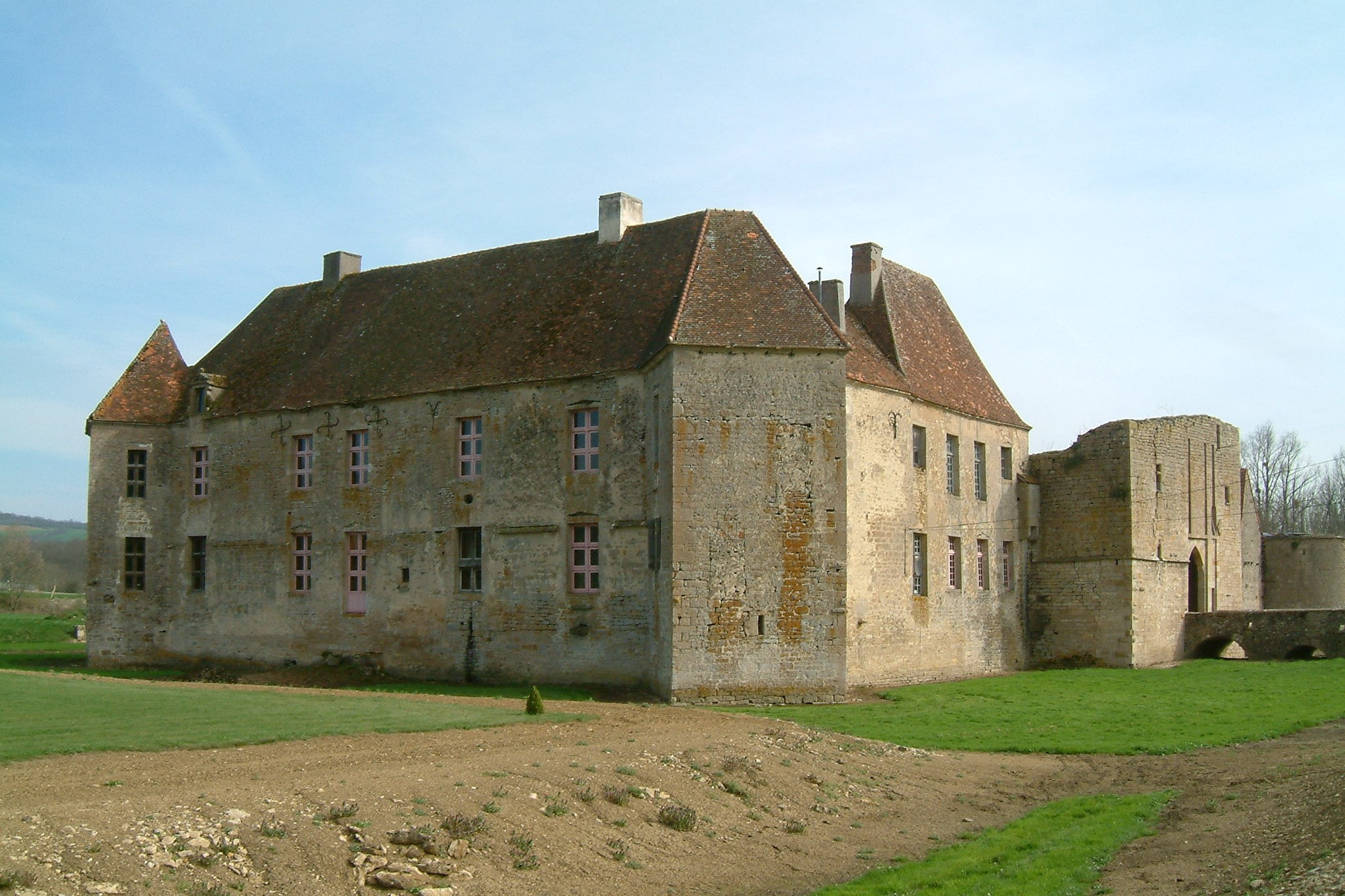
- Chateau
- Location of Éguilly
- Location within France Location within Bourgogne-Franche-Comté
- Coordinates: 47°18′16″N 4°30′04″E
- Country: France
- Region: Bourgogne-Franche-Comté
- Department: Côte-d'Or
- Arrondissement: Beaune
- Canton: Arnay-le-Duc

Government
  - Mayor (2020–2026): Jean-Marie Faivret
- Area^{1}: 5.69 km^{2} (2.20 sq mi)
- Elevation: 353 m (1,158 ft)
- Highest elevation: 506 m (1,660 ft)
- Lowest elevation: 344 m (1,129 ft)
- Population (2023): 72
  - Density: 13/km^{2} (33/sq mi)
- Time zone: UTC+01:00 (CET)
  - Summer (DST): UTC+02:00 (CEST)
- INSEE/Postal code: 21244 /21320
- ^{1} French Land Register data, which excludes lakes, ponds, glaciers > 1 km^{2} (0.386 sq mi or 247 acres) and river estuaries.

Éguilly (French pronunciation: [eɡiji]) is a commune in the Côte-d'Or department in eastern France.

== Population ==
Historical population
Year	Pop.	±% p.a.
1968	64	—
1975	61	−0.68%
1982	53	−1.99%
1990	38	−4.07%
1999	40	+0.57%
2007	64	+6.05%
2012	63	−0.31%
2017	62	−0.32%
2023	72	+2.52%
Source: INSEE

== See also ==
- Communes of the Côte-d'Or department
