= Montagny-lès-Seurre =

- Commune
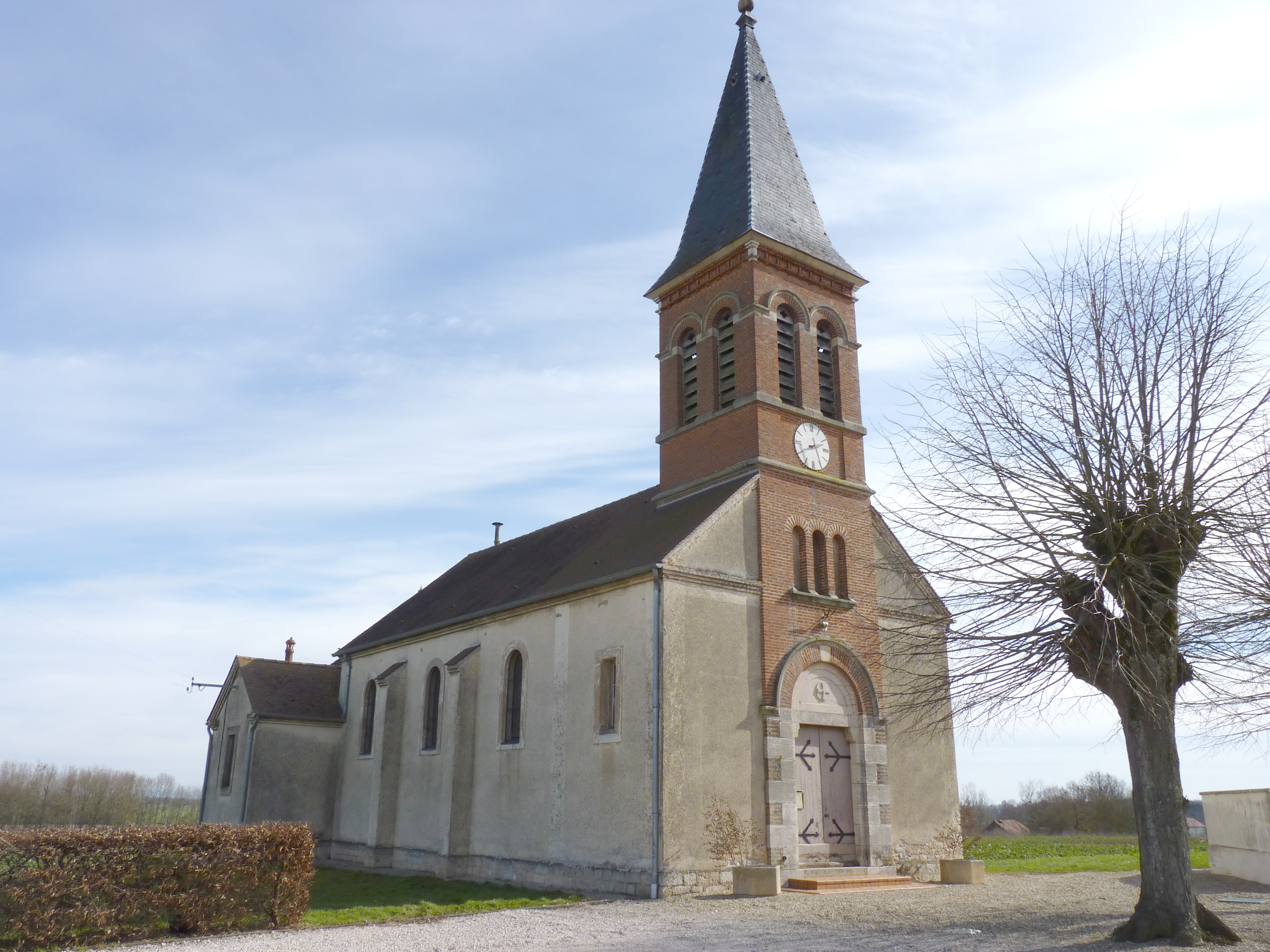
- The church in Montagny-lès-Seurre
- Location of Montagny-lès-Seurre
- Location within France Location within Bourgogne-Franche-Comté
- Coordinates: 47°01′27″N 5°15′16″E
- Country: France
- Region: Bourgogne-Franche-Comté
- Department: Côte-d'Or
- Arrondissement: Beaune
- Canton: Brazey-en-Plaine
- Intercommunality: Rives de Saône

Government
  - Mayor (2020–2026): Lucie Bonnin
- Area^{1}: 7.16 km^{2} (2.76 sq mi)
- Elevation: 187 m (614 ft)
- Highest elevation: 193 m (633 ft)
- Lowest elevation: 181 m (594 ft)
- Population (2023): 117
  - Density: 16.3/km^{2} (42.3/sq mi)
- Time zone: UTC+01:00 (CET)
  - Summer (DST): UTC+02:00 (CEST)
- INSEE/Postal code: 21424 /21250
- ^{1} French Land Register data, which excludes lakes, ponds, glaciers > 1 km^{2} (0.386 sq mi or 247 acres) and river estuaries.

Montagny-lès-Seurre (French pronunciation: [mɔ̃taɲi lɛ sœʁ], literally Montagny near Seurre) is a commune in the Côte-d'Or department in eastern France.

== Population ==
Historical population
Year	Pop.	±% p.a.
1968	111	—
1975	112	+0.13%
1982	107	−0.65%
1990	119	+1.34%
1999	112	−0.67%
2007	105	−0.80%
2012	109	+0.75%
2017	104	−0.93%
2023	117	+1.98%
Source: INSEE

== See also ==
- Communes of the Côte-d'Or department

== Gallery ==
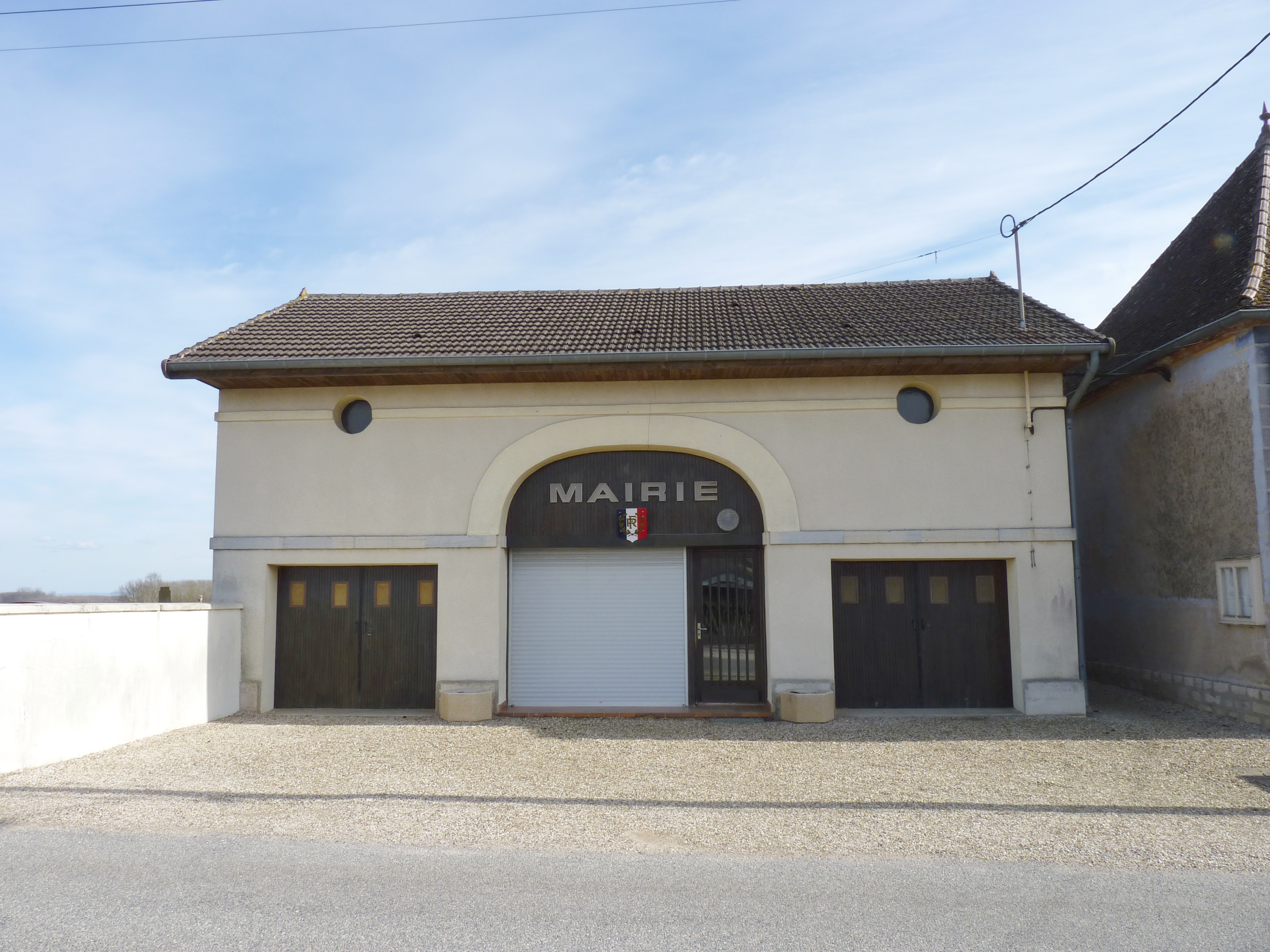
City Council

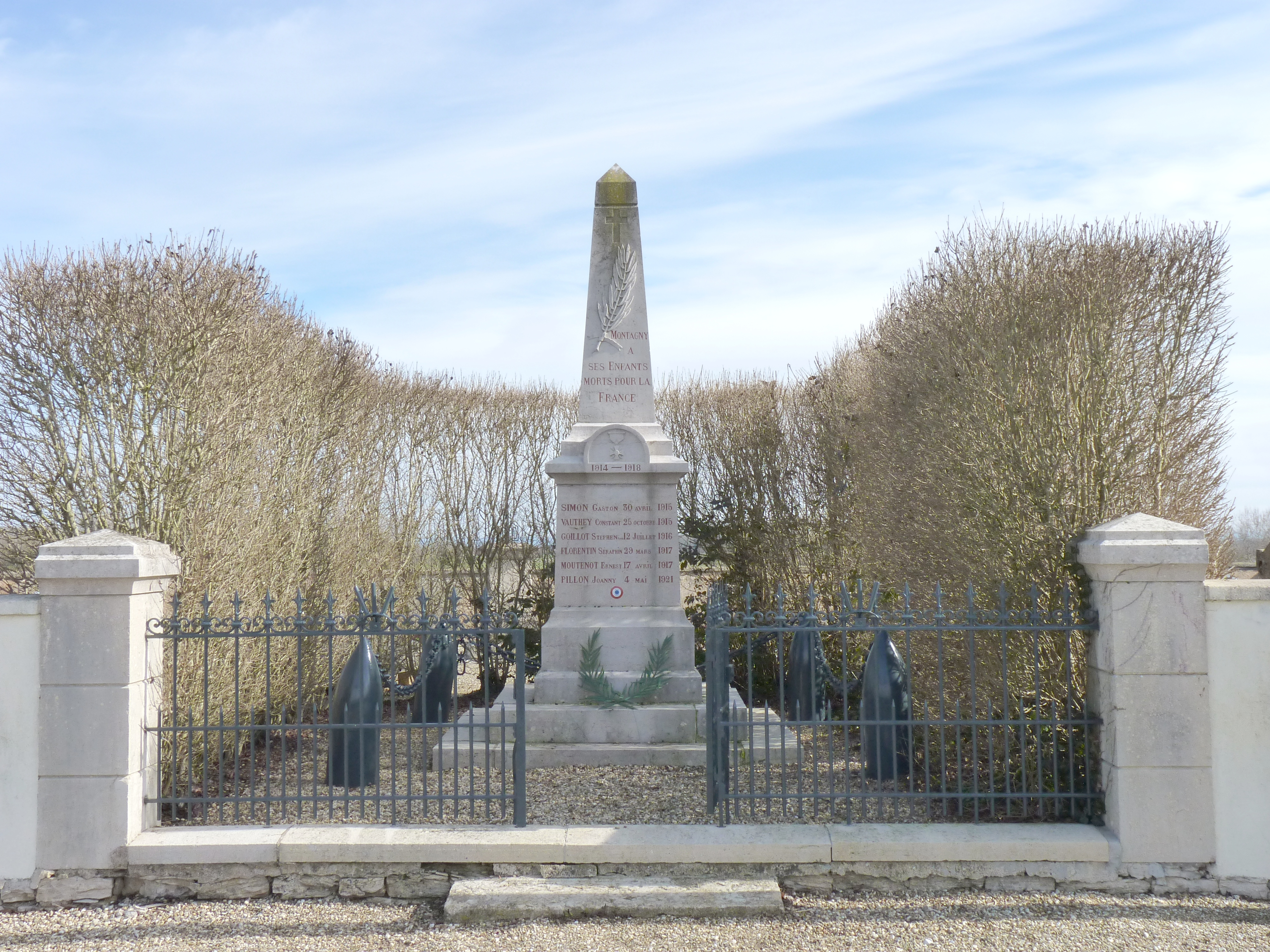
First World War Memorial

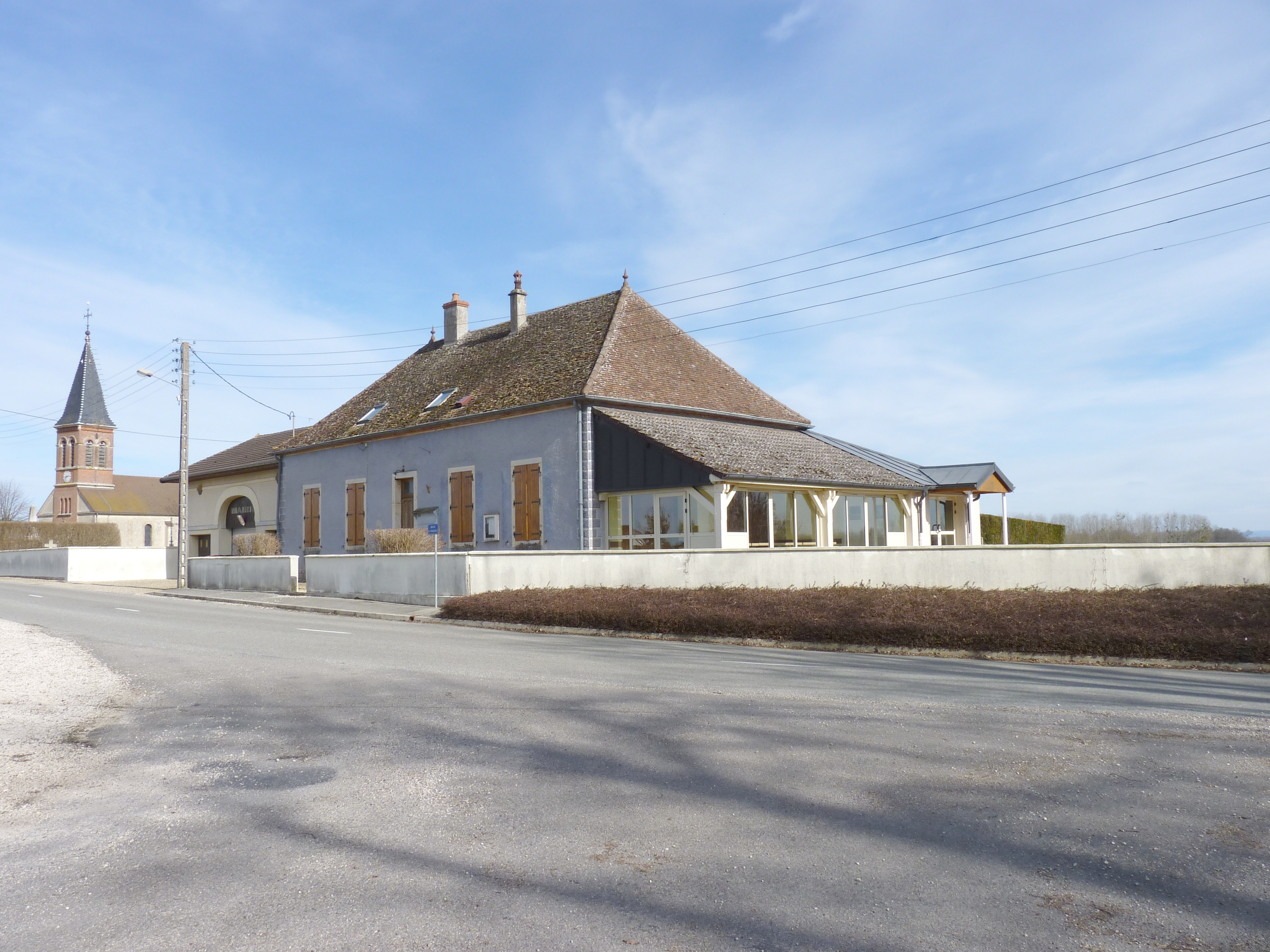
The old school

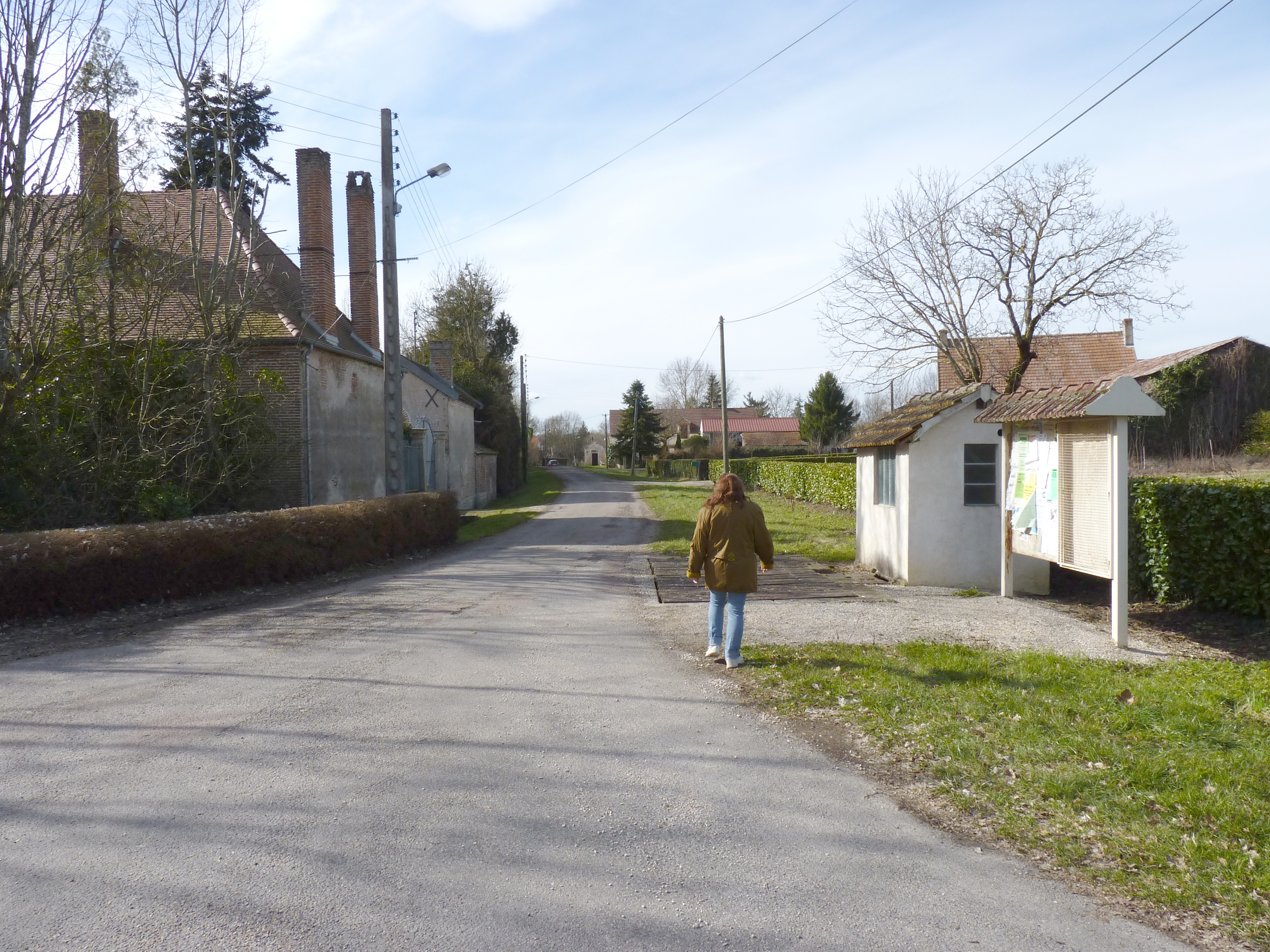
Rue de l'Église
