= Antheuil =

- Commune
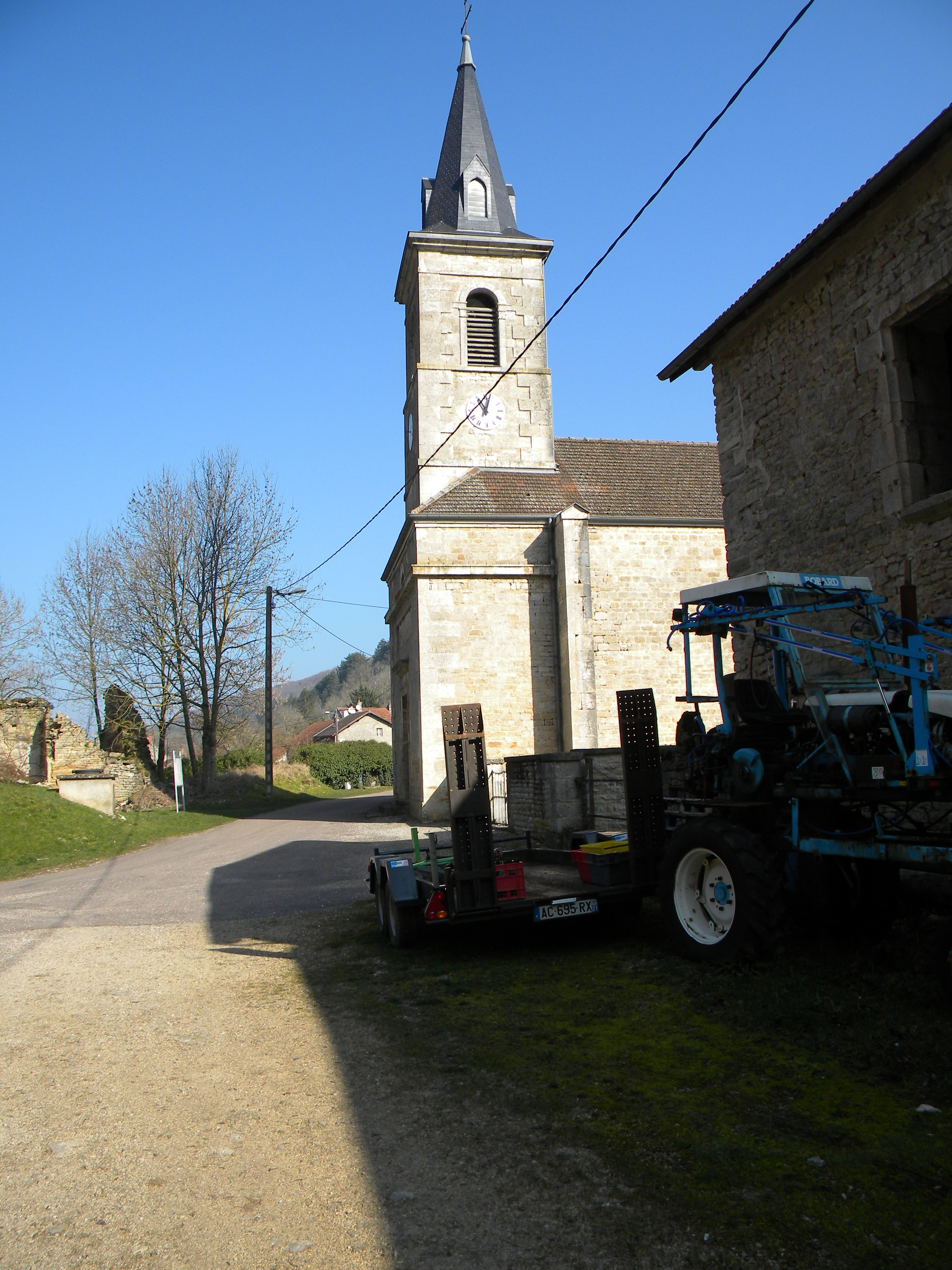
- San Antide Church

- Coat of arms
- Location of Antheuil
- Location within France Location within Bourgogne-Franche-Comté
- Coordinates: 47°10′24″N 4°44′47″E
- Country: France
- Region: Bourgogne-Franche-Comté
- Department: Côte-d'Or
- Arrondissement: Beaune
- Canton: Arnay-le-Duc
- Intercommunality: Pouilly-en-Auxois/Bligny-sur-Ouche

Government
  - Mayor (2024–2026): Aurélie Seguin
- Area^{1}: 10.28 km^{2} (3.97 sq mi)
- Elevation: 510 m (1,670 ft)
- Highest elevation: 613 m (2,011 ft)
- Lowest elevation: 345 m (1,132 ft)
- Population (2023): 63
  - Density: 6.1/km^{2} (16/sq mi)
- Time zone: UTC+01:00 (CET)
  - Summer (DST): UTC+02:00 (CEST)
- INSEE/Postal code: 21014 /21360
- ^{1} French Land Register data, which excludes lakes, ponds, glaciers > 1 km^{2} (0.386 sq mi or 247 acres) and river estuaries.

Antheuil (French pronunciation: [ɑ̃tœj]) is a commune in the Côte-d'Or department in the Bourgogne-Franche-Comté region of eastern France.

== Geography ==
Antheuil is located some 40 km south-west of Dijon and 25 km north-west of Beaune. It can be accessed by the minor D115 road running north from the D18 road passing through the village and continuing north-west to join the D33. The commune is hilly and heavily forested.

The Antheuil river rises south of the village and flows north-west to join the Ouche near Veuvey-sur-Ouche.

=== Heraldry ===
Arms of Antheuil	Blazon: Gules, two lances of Or saltirewise debruised by a stone tablet in Argent charged with lines in sable; in chief wavy of Azure soutenu in Argent charged with three daisies of Or.

== Administration ==
List of Successive Mayors

From	To	Name
1945	1965	Théophile Maurice Gauthier
?	2001	Jean Anus
2001	2008	Jean-Claude Lebreuil
2008	2014	Michel Lefort
2014	2024	Martine Seguin
2024	2026	Aurélie Seguin

== Demography ==
Historical population

Year	Pop.	±% p.a.
1793	224	—
1821	304	+1.10%
1846	326	+0.28%
1872	320	−0.07%
1901	211	−1.43%
1926	126	−2.04%
1946	85	−1.95%
1962	63	−1.85%
1968	51	−3.46%

Year	Pop.	±% p.a.
1975	44	−2.09%
1982	46	+0.64%
1990	53	+1.79%
1999	65	+2.29%
2007	66	+0.19%
2012	63	−0.93%
2017	60	−0.97%
2023	63	+0.82%

Source: EHESS and INSEE

== Sites and monuments ==
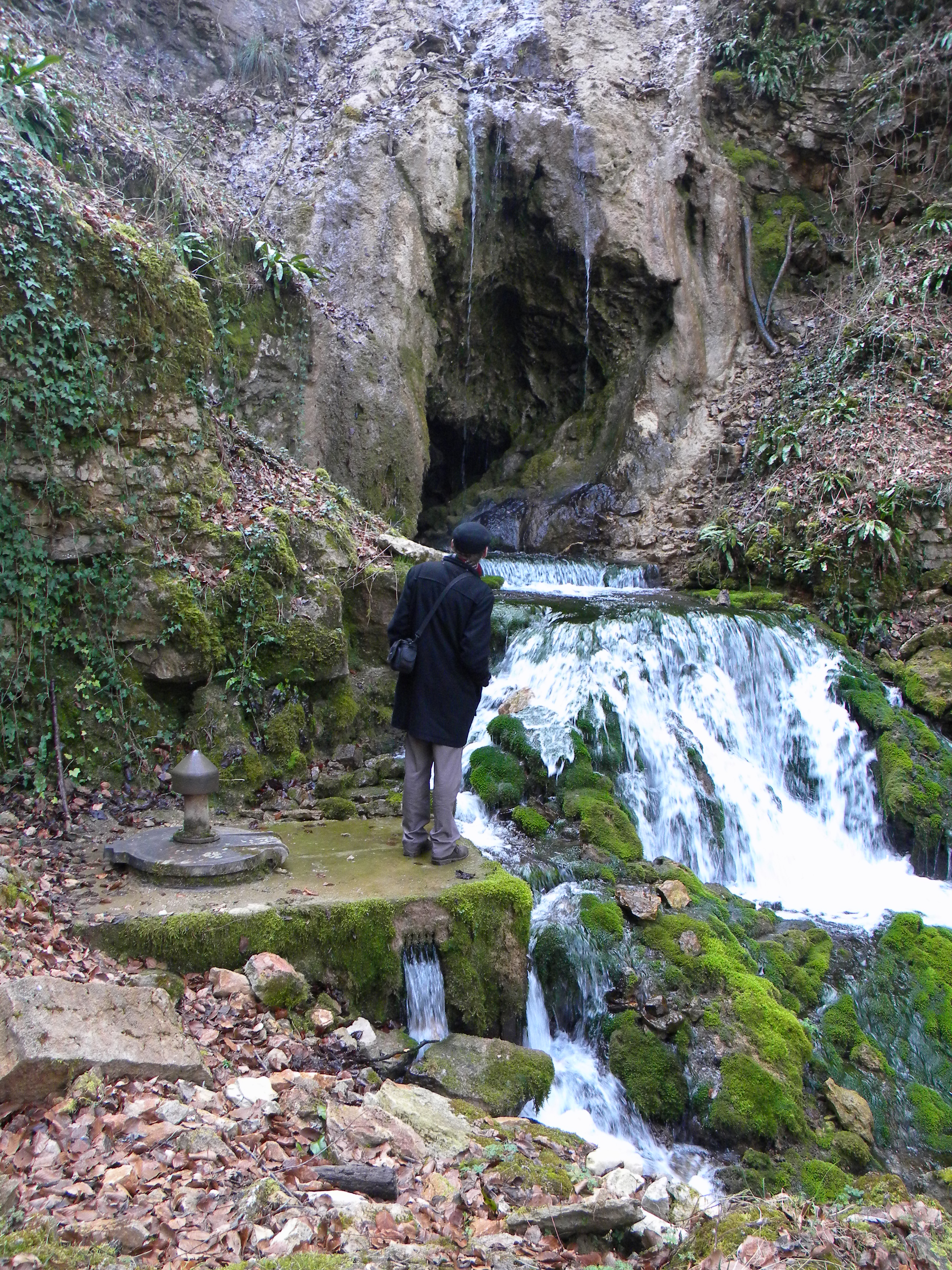
Antheuil Grotto

- Le Bel Affeux, a picturesque stream
- La Roche percée (Pierced rock), a hill in the east
- La Roche des Demoiselles (Young ladies' rock), a hill in the west
- La Roche plate (Flat rock)
- The Château Mignon
- The Parish Church of Saint-Antide contains two items t5hat are registered as historical objects:
  - A Statue: Virgin and child (16th century)
  - A Stoup (12th century)

== See also ==
- Communes of the Côte-d'Or department
