= Clomot =

- Commune
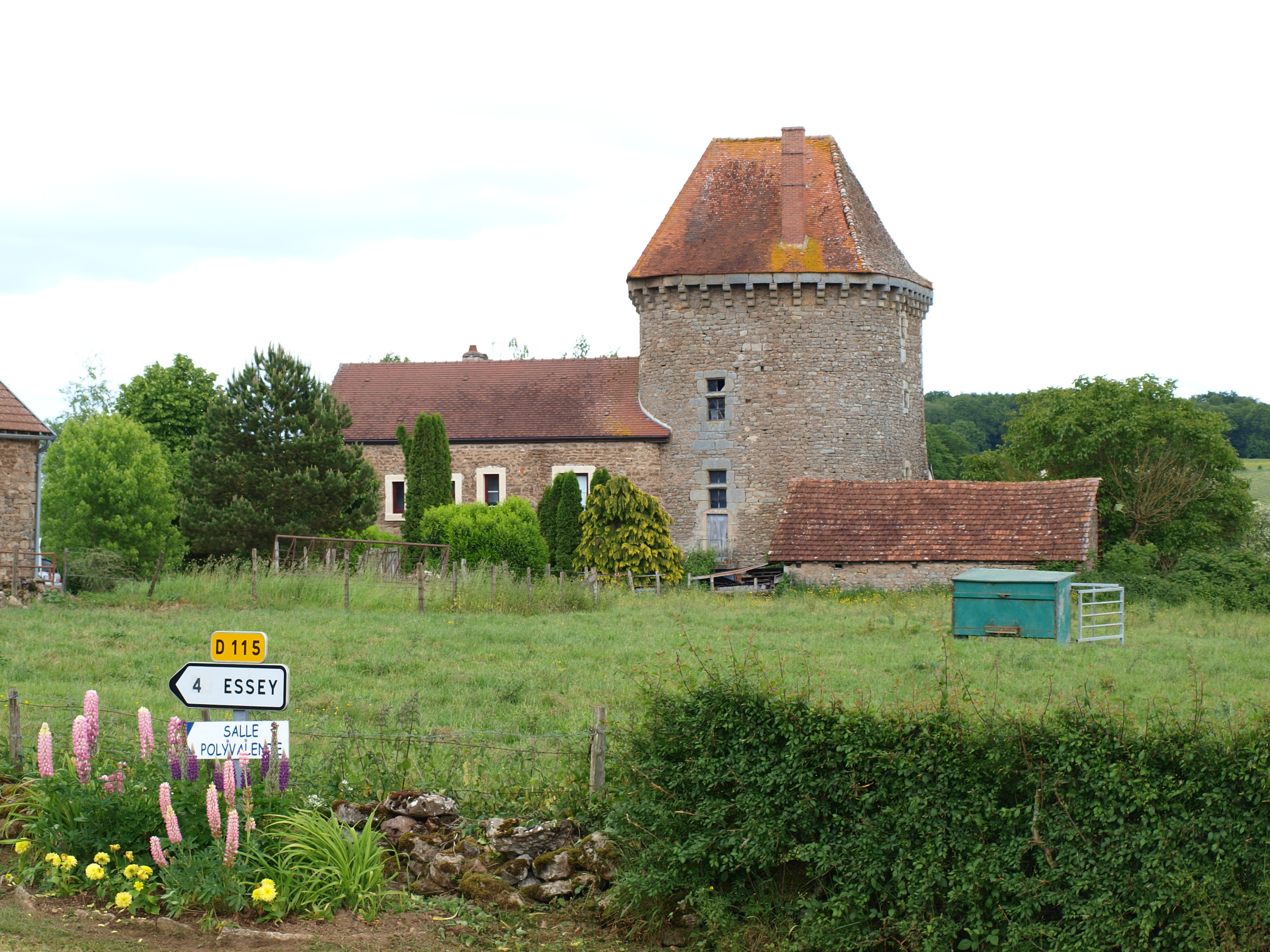
- Tower of the chateau
- Location of Clomot
- Location within France Location within Bourgogne-Franche-Comté
- Coordinates: 47°11′30″N 4°29′11″E
- Country: France
- Region: Bourgogne-Franche-Comté
- Department: Côte-d'Or
- Arrondissement: Beaune
- Canton: Arnay-le-Duc
- Intercommunality: Pays Arnay Liernais

Government
  - Mayor (2020–2026): Patrice Ledoux
- Area^{1}: 8.49 km^{2} (3.28 sq mi)
- Highest elevation: 411 m (1,348 ft)
- Lowest elevation: 353 m (1,158 ft)
- Population (2023): 121
  - Density: 14.3/km^{2} (36.9/sq mi)
- Time zone: UTC+01:00 (CET)
  - Summer (DST): UTC+02:00 (CEST)
- INSEE/Postal code: 21181 /21230
- ^{1} French Land Register data, which excludes lakes, ponds, glaciers > 1 km^{2} (0.386 sq mi or 247 acres) and river estuaries.

Clomot (French pronunciation: [klɔmo]) is a commune in the Côte-d'Or department in eastern France.

== Population ==
Historical population
Year	Pop.	±% p.a.
1968	152	—
1975	141	−1.07%
1982	130	−1.15%
1990	122	−0.79%
1999	123	+0.09%
2007	102	−2.31%
2012	126	+4.32%
2017	137	+1.69%
2023	121	−2.05%
Source: INSEE

== See also ==
- Communes of the Côte-d'Or department
