= Essey, Côte-d'Or =

Essey
- Commune
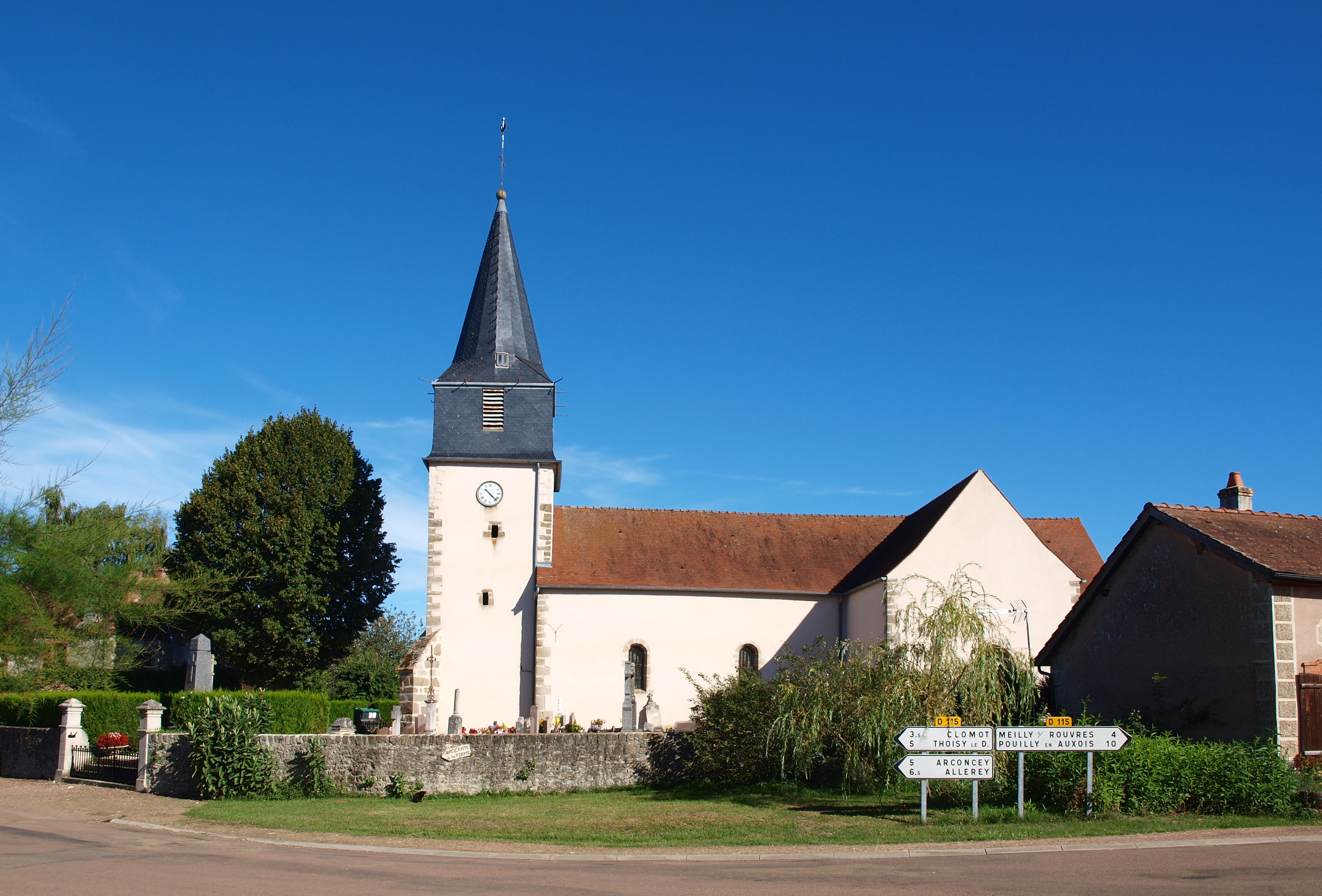
- The church in Essey

- Coat of arms
- Location of Essey
- Location within France Location within Bourgogne-Franche-Comté
- Coordinates: 47°12′21″N 4°31′36″E
- Country: France
- Region: Bourgogne-Franche-Comté
- Department: Côte-d'Or
- Arrondissement: Beaune
- Canton: Arnay-le-Duc

Government
  - Mayor (2020–2026): Monique Casamayor
- Area^{1}: 12.61 km^{2} (4.87 sq mi)
- Elevation: 404 m (1,325 ft)
- Highest elevation: 435 m (1,427 ft)
- Lowest elevation: 373 m (1,224 ft)
- Population (2023): 315
  - Density: 25.0/km^{2} (64.7/sq mi)
- Time zone: UTC+01:00 (CET)
  - Summer (DST): UTC+02:00 (CEST)
- INSEE/Postal code: 21251 /21320
- ^{1} French Land Register data, which excludes lakes, ponds, glaciers > 1 km^{2} (0.386 sq mi or 247 acres) and river estuaries.

Essey (French pronunciation: [esɛ]) is a commune in the Côte-d'Or department in eastern France.

== Population ==
Historical population
Year	Pop.	±% p.a.
1968	166	—
1975	183	+1.40%
1982	172	−0.88%
1990	122	−4.20%
1999	140	+1.54%
2007	182	+3.33%
2012	256	+7.06%
2017	275	+1.44%
2023	315	+2.29%
Source: INSEE

== See also ==
- Communes of the Côte-d'Or department
