= Lacanche =

- Commune
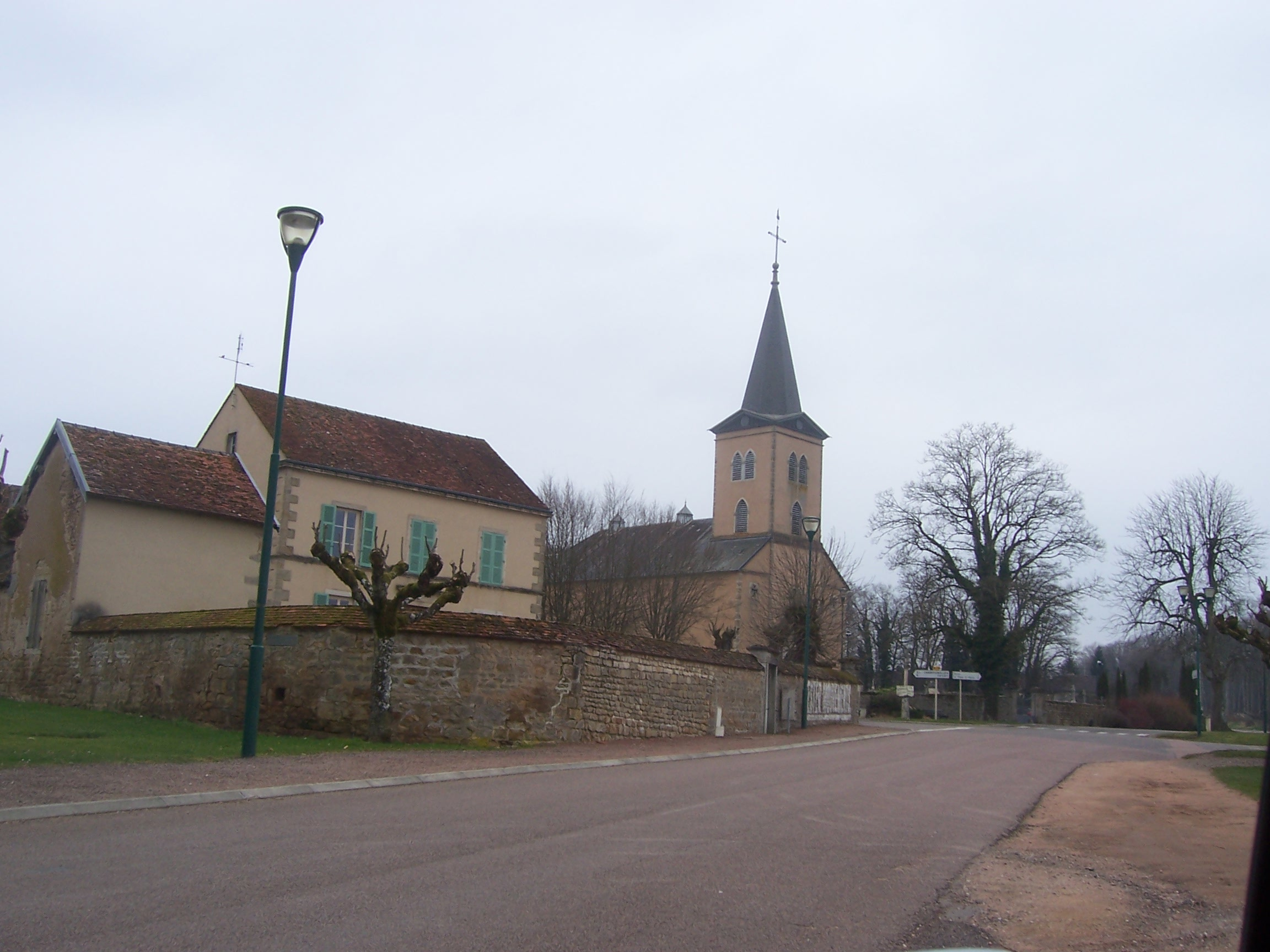
- The church in Lacanche
- Location of Lacanche
- Location within France Location within Bourgogne-Franche-Comté
- Coordinates: 47°04′33″N 4°33′37″E
- Country: France
- Region: Bourgogne-Franche-Comté
- Department: Côte-d'Or
- Arrondissement: Beaune
- Canton: Arnay-le-Duc
- Intercommunality: Pays Arnay Liernais

Government
  - Mayor (2020–2026): Michel Libre
- Area^{1}: 7.16 km^{2} (2.76 sq mi)
- Highest elevation: 447 m (1,467 ft)
- Lowest elevation: 350 m (1,150 ft)
- Population (2023): 476
  - Density: 66.5/km^{2} (172/sq mi)
- Time zone: UTC+01:00 (CET)
  - Summer (DST): UTC+02:00 (CEST)
- INSEE/Postal code: 21334 /21230
- ^{1} French Land Register data, which excludes lakes, ponds, glaciers > 1 km^{2} (0.386 sq mi or 247 acres) and river estuaries.

Lacanche (French pronunciation: [lakɑ̃ʃ]) is a commune in the Côte-d'Or department in eastern France.

== Population ==
Historical population
Year	Pop.	±% p.a.
1968	943	—
1975	972	+0.43%
1982	808	−2.61%
1990	626	−3.14%
1999	629	+0.05%
2007	613	−0.32%
2012	594	−0.63%
2017	561	−1.14%
2023	476	−2.70%
Source: INSEE

== See also ==
- Communes of the Côte-d'Or department
