= Musigny =

- Commune
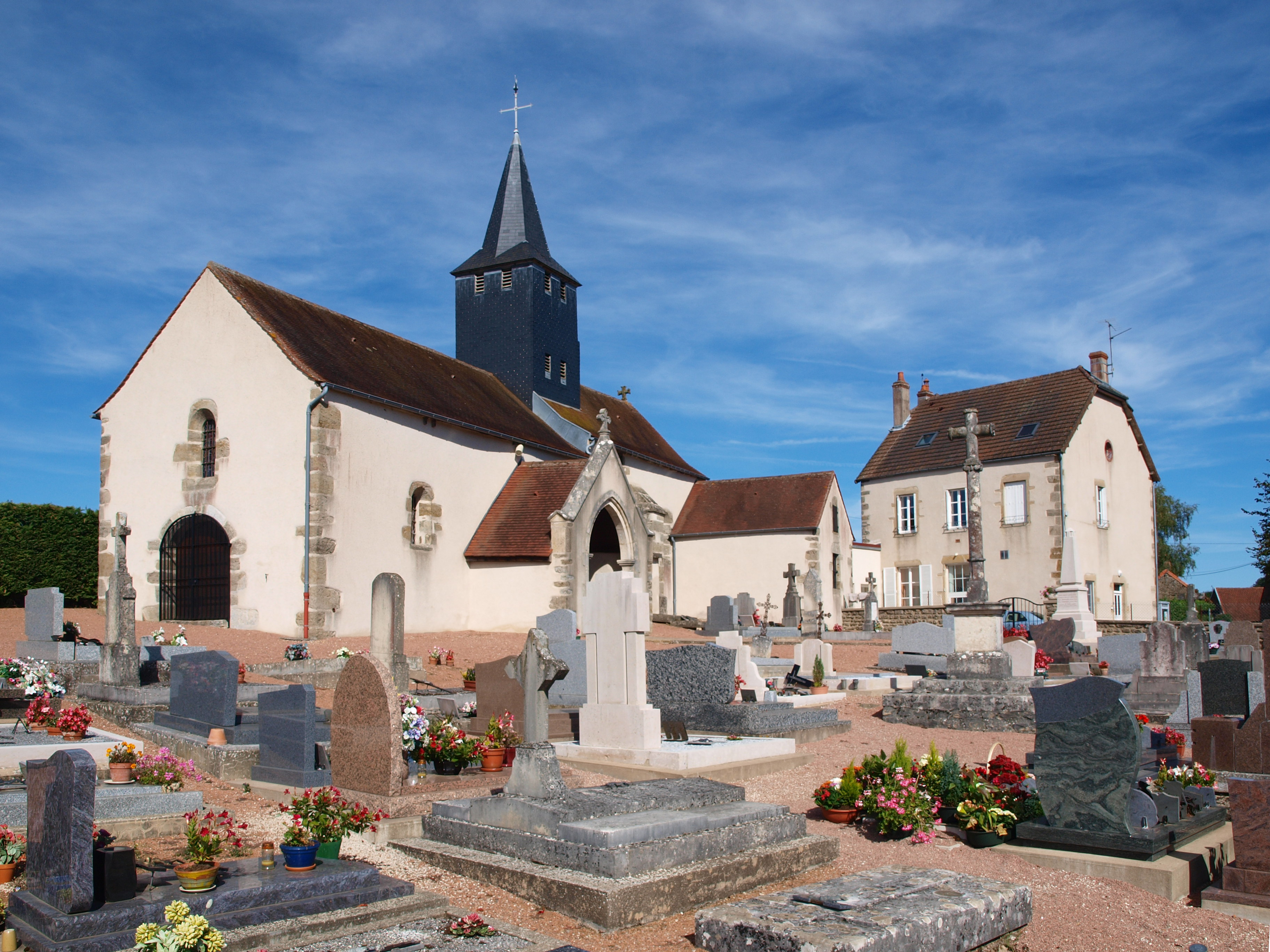
- The church and town hall in Musigny
- Location of Musigny
- Location within France Location within Bourgogne-Franche-Comté
- Coordinates: 47°09′47″N 4°31′12″E
- Country: France
- Region: Bourgogne-Franche-Comté
- Department: Côte-d'Or
- Arrondissement: Beaune
- Canton: Arnay-le-Duc

Government
  - Mayor (2020–2026): Alain Bigeard
- Area^{1}: 6.11 km^{2} (2.36 sq mi)
- Elevation: 390 m (1,280 ft)
- Highest elevation: 442 m (1,450 ft)
- Lowest elevation: 360 m (1,180 ft)
- Population (2023): 87
  - Density: 14/km^{2} (37/sq mi)
- Time zone: UTC+01:00 (CET)
  - Summer (DST): UTC+02:00 (CEST)
- INSEE/Postal code: 21447 /21230
- ^{1} French Land Register data, which excludes lakes, ponds, glaciers > 1 km^{2} (0.386 sq mi or 247 acres) and river estuaries.

Musigny (French pronunciation: [myziɲi]) is a commune in the Côte-d'Or department in eastern France.

== Population ==
Historical population
Year	Pop.	±% p.a.
1968	154	—
1975	125	−2.94%
1982	100	−3.14%
1990	122	+2.52%
1999	115	−0.65%
2007	90	−3.02%
2012	84	−1.37%
2017	83	−0.24%
2023	87	+0.79%
Source: INSEE

== See also ==
- Communes of the Côte-d'Or department
