= Vandenesse-en-Auxois =

- Commune
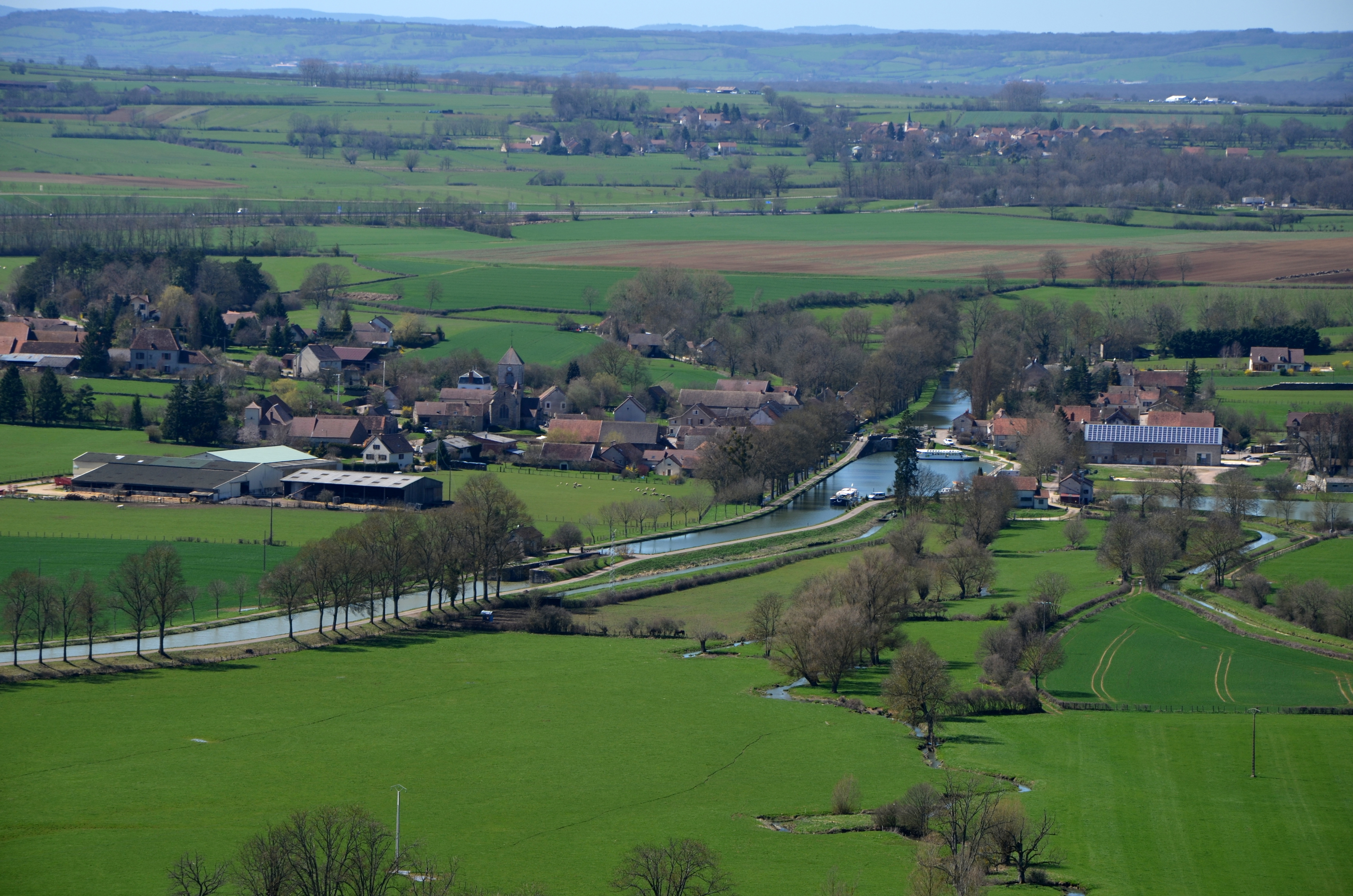
- Bourgogne Canal

- Coat of arms
- Location of Vandenesse-en-Auxois
- Location within France Location within Bourgogne-Franche-Comté
- Coordinates: 47°13′14″N 4°36′59″E
- Country: France
- Region: Bourgogne-Franche-Comté
- Department: Côte-d'Or
- Arrondissement: Beaune
- Canton: Arnay-le-Duc

Government
  - Mayor (2020–2026): Michel Poillot
- Area^{1}: 11.25 km^{2} (4.34 sq mi)
- Elevation: 360 m (1,180 ft)
- Highest elevation: 480 m (1,570 ft)
- Lowest elevation: 342 m (1,122 ft)
- Population (2023): 298
  - Density: 26.5/km^{2} (68.6/sq mi)
- Time zone: UTC+01:00 (CET)
  - Summer (DST): UTC+02:00 (CEST)
- INSEE/Postal code: 21652 /21320
- ^{1} French Land Register data, which excludes lakes, ponds, glaciers > 1 km^{2} (0.386 sq mi or 247 acres) and river estuaries.

Vandenesse-en-Auxois (French pronunciation: [vɑ̃dnɛs ɑ̃.n‿o(k)swa], lit. 'Vandenesse in Auxois') is a commune in the Côte-d'Or department in eastern France.

== Population ==
Historical population
Year	Pop.	±% p.a.
1968	217	—
1975	190	−1.88%
1982	189	−0.08%
1990	220	+1.92%
1999	216	−0.20%
2007	271	+2.88%
2012	275	+0.29%
2017	302	+1.89%
2023	298	−0.22%
Source: INSEE

== See also ==
- Communes of the Côte-d'Or department
