= Molinot =

- Commune
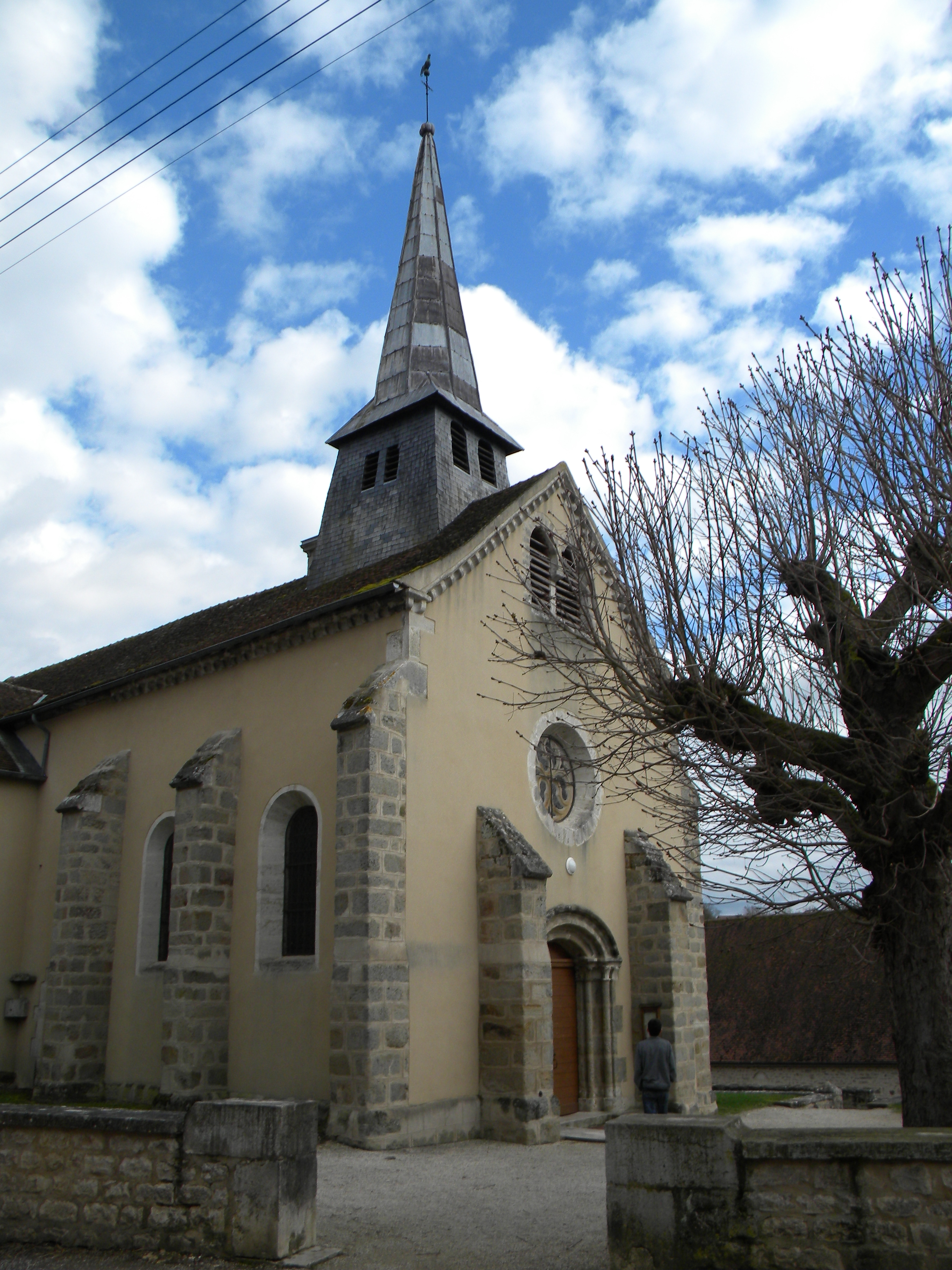
- The church in Molinot
- Location of Molinot
- Location within France Location within Bourgogne-Franche-Comté
- Coordinates: 47°00′54″N 4°35′21″E
- Country: France
- Region: Bourgogne-Franche-Comté
- Department: Côte-d'Or
- Arrondissement: Beaune
- Canton: Arnay-le-Duc
- Intercommunality: CA Beaune Côte et Sud

Government
  - Mayor (2020–2026): Christian Poulleau
- Area^{1}: 12.68 km^{2} (4.90 sq mi)
- Highest elevation: 495 m (1,624 ft)
- Lowest elevation: 339 m (1,112 ft)
- Population (2023): 175
  - Density: 13.8/km^{2} (35.7/sq mi)
- Time zone: UTC+01:00 (CET)
  - Summer (DST): UTC+02:00 (CEST)
- INSEE/Postal code: 21420 /21340
- ^{1} French Land Register data, which excludes lakes, ponds, glaciers > 1 km^{2} (0.386 sq mi or 247 acres) and river estuaries.

Molinot (French pronunciation: [mɔlino]) is a commune in the Côte-d'Or department in eastern France.

== Population ==
Historical population
Year	Pop.	±% p.a.
1968	242	—
1975	245	+0.18%
1982	186	−3.86%
1990	153	−2.41%
1999	157	+0.29%
2007	151	−0.49%
2012	149	−0.27%
2017	158	+1.18%
2023	175	+1.72%
Source: INSEE

== See also ==
- Communes of the Côte-d'Or department
