= Chaudenay-la-Ville =

- Commune
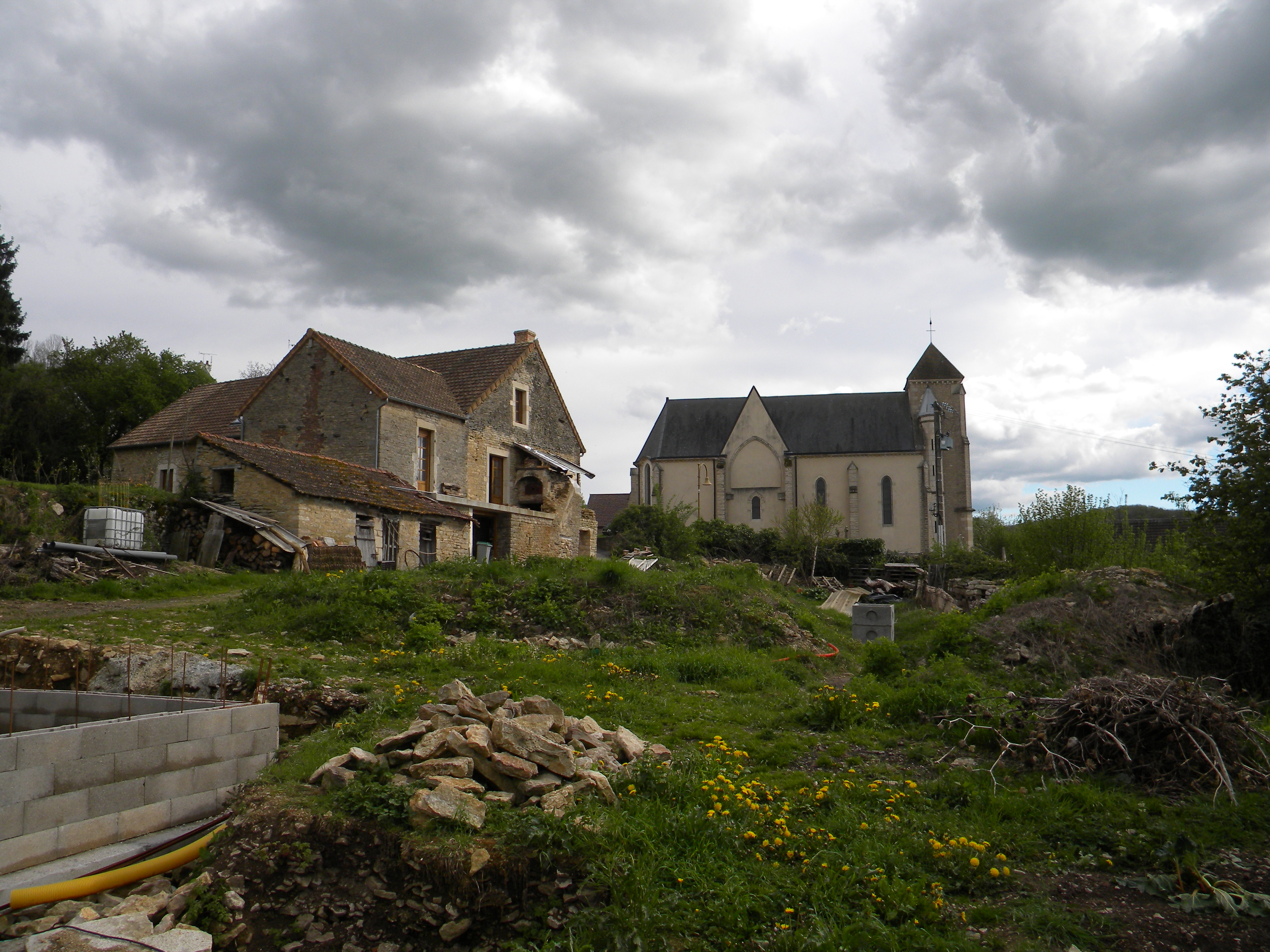
- A general view of Chaudenay-la-Ville
- Location of Chaudenay-la-Ville
- Location within France Location within Bourgogne-Franche-Comté
- Coordinates: 47°09′53″N 4°39′01″E
- Country: France
- Region: Bourgogne-Franche-Comté
- Department: Côte-d'Or
- Arrondissement: Beaune
- Canton: Arnay-le-Duc

Government
  - Mayor (2020–2026): Bernard Humbert
- Area^{1}: 5.18 km^{2} (2.00 sq mi)
- Elevation: 400 m (1,300 ft)
- Highest elevation: 551 m (1,808 ft)
- Lowest elevation: 365 m (1,198 ft)
- Population (2023): 37
  - Density: 7.1/km^{2} (18/sq mi)
- Time zone: UTC+01:00 (CET)
  - Summer (DST): UTC+02:00 (CEST)
- INSEE/Postal code: 21155 /21360
- ^{1} French Land Register data, which excludes lakes, ponds, glaciers > 1 km^{2} (0.386 sq mi or 247 acres) and river estuaries.

Chaudenay-la-Ville (French pronunciation: [ʃodnɛ la vil]) is a commune in the Côte-d'Or department in eastern France.

== Population ==
Historical population
Year	Pop.	±% p.a.
1968	47	—
1975	29	−6.67%
1982	23	−3.26%
1990	23	+0.00%
1999	21	−1.01%
2007	33	+5.81%
2012	41	+4.44%
2017	44	+1.42%
2023	37	−2.85%
Source: INSEE

== See also ==
- Communes of the Côte-d'Or department
