= Sainte-Sabine =

- Commune
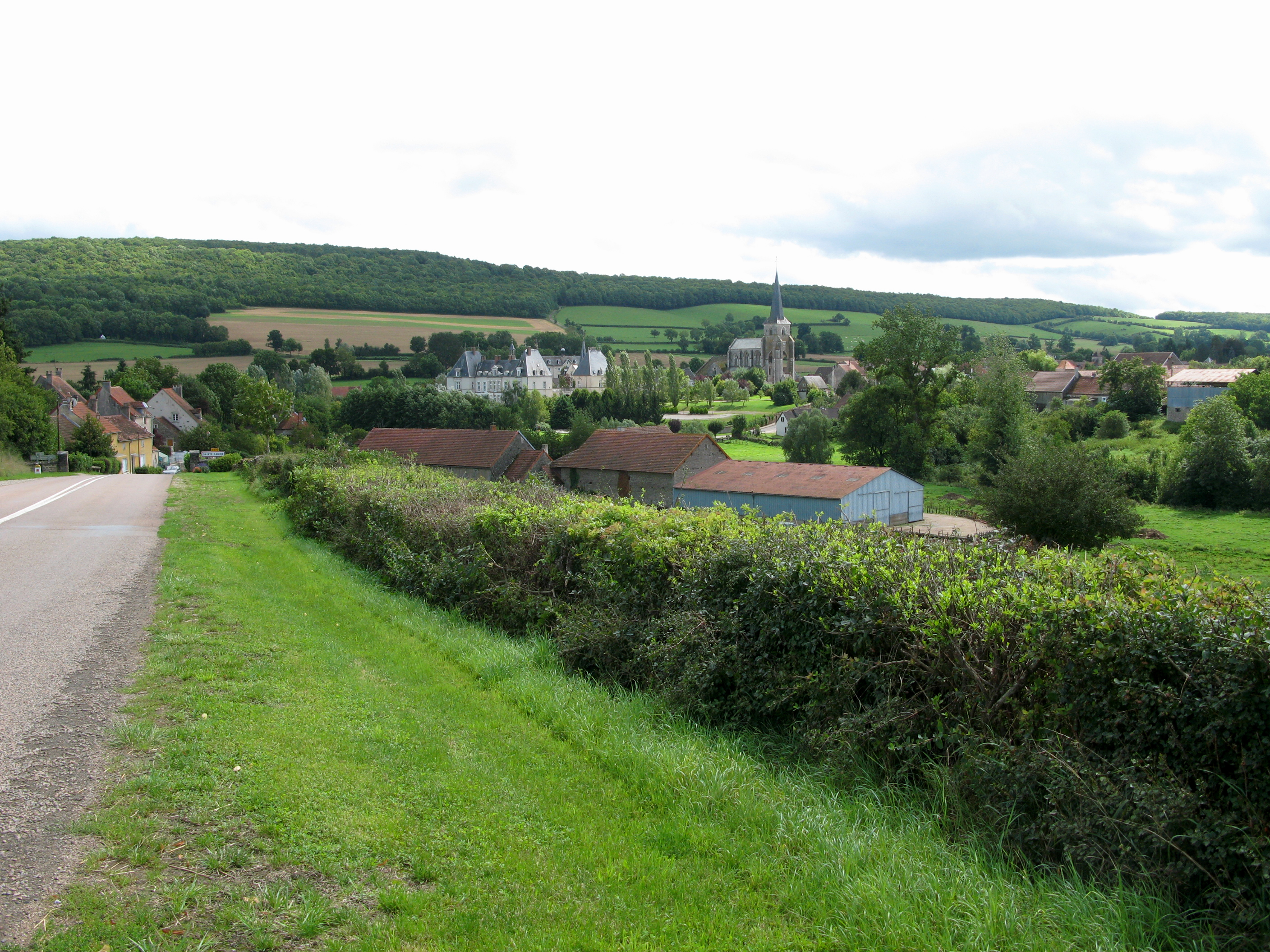
- A general view of Sainte-Sabine from the north
- Location of Sainte-Sabine
- Location within France Location within Bourgogne-Franche-Comté
- Coordinates: 47°11′32″N 4°37′32″E
- Country: France
- Region: Bourgogne-Franche-Comté
- Department: Côte-d'Or
- Arrondissement: Beaune
- Canton: Arnay-le-Duc

Government
  - Mayor (2020–2026): Véronique Godot
- Area^{1}: 8.41 km^{2} (3.25 sq mi)
- Elevation: 380 m (1,250 ft)
- Highest elevation: 500 m (1,600 ft)
- Lowest elevation: 343 m (1,125 ft)
- Population (2023): 172
  - Density: 20.5/km^{2} (53.0/sq mi)
- Time zone: UTC+01:00 (CET)
  - Summer (DST): UTC+02:00 (CEST)
- INSEE/Postal code: 21570 /21320
- ^{1} French Land Register data, which excludes lakes, ponds, glaciers > 1 km^{2} (0.386 sq mi or 247 acres) and river estuaries.

Sainte-Sabine (French pronunciation: [sɛ̃t sabin]) is a commune in the Côte-d'Or department in eastern France.

== Population ==
Historical population
| Year | Pop. | ±% p.a. |
|---|---|---|
| 1968 | 190 | — |
| 1975 | 216 | +1.85% |
| 1982 | 193 | −1.60% |
| 1990 | 183 | −0.66% |
| 1999 | 172 | −0.69% |
| 2007 | 188 | +1.12% |
| 2012 | 190 | +0.21% |
| 2017 | 174 | −1.74% |
| 2023 | 172 | −0.19% |
Source: INSEE

== See also ==
- Communes of the Côte-d'Or department
