= Montmain =

Montmain is the name of two communes in France:

- Montmain, Côte-d'Or
- Montmain, Seine-Maritime

== Other ==
- Montmains, a Premier cru vineyard in Chablis
