= Grosbois-lès-Tichey =

- Commune
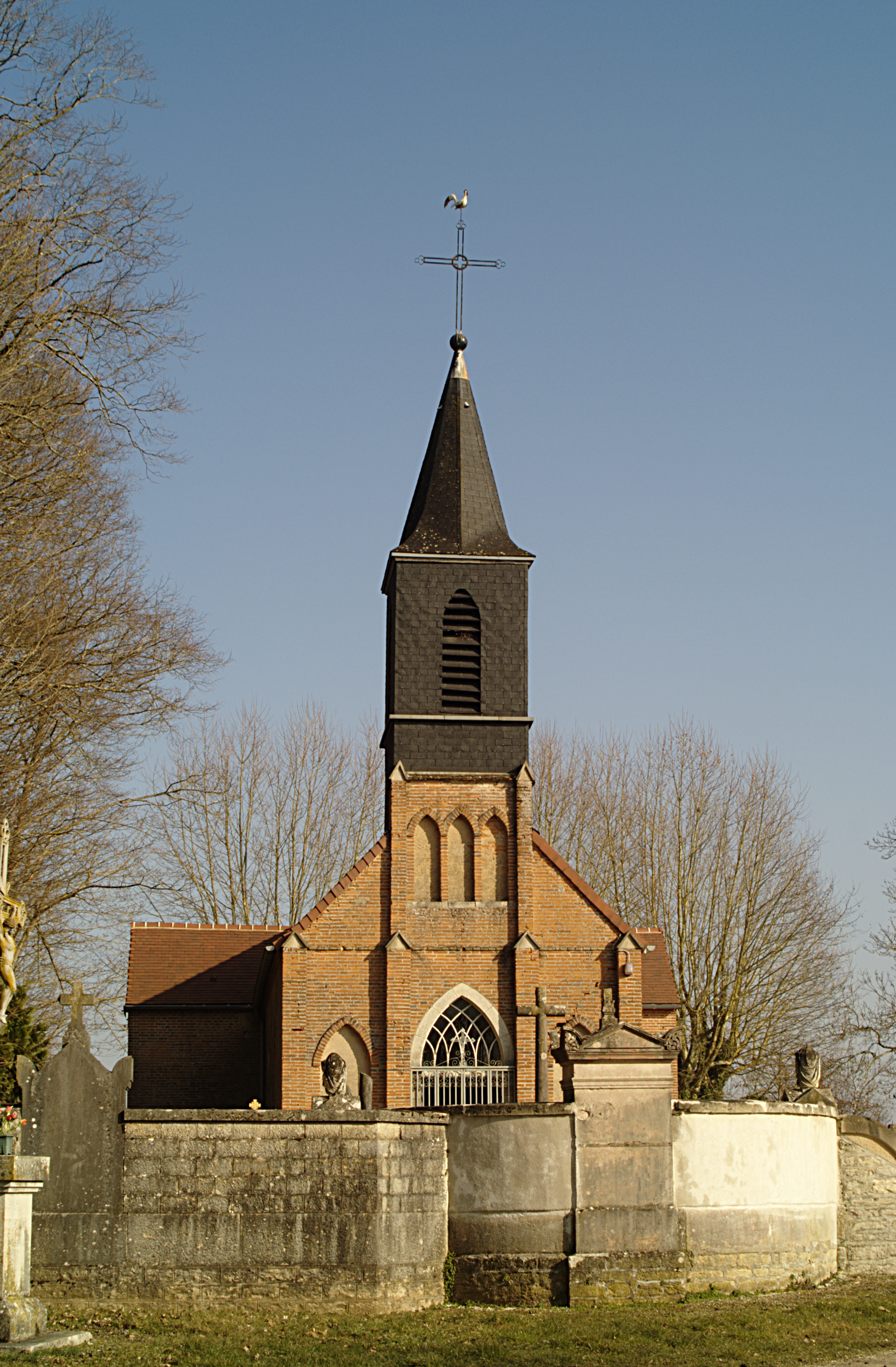
- The church in Grosbois-lès-Tichey
- Location of Grosbois-lès-Tichey
- Location within France Location within Bourgogne-Franche-Comté
- Coordinates: 47°00′27″N 5°14′26″E
- Country: France
- Region: Bourgogne-Franche-Comté
- Department: Côte-d'Or
- Arrondissement: Beaune
- Canton: Brazey-en-Plaine
- Intercommunality: Rives de Saône

Government
  - Mayor (2020–2026): Fabrice Bracquemond
- Area^{1}: 4.85 km^{2} (1.87 sq mi)
- Elevation: 182 m (597 ft)
- Highest elevation: 193 m (633 ft)
- Lowest elevation: 182 m (597 ft)
- Population (2023): 67
  - Density: 14/km^{2} (36/sq mi)
- Time zone: UTC+01:00 (CET)
  - Summer (DST): UTC+02:00 (CEST)
- INSEE/Postal code: 21311 /21250
- ^{1} French Land Register data, which excludes lakes, ponds, glaciers > 1 km^{2} (0.386 sq mi or 247 acres) and river estuaries.

Grosbois-lès-Tichey (French pronunciation: [ɡʁobwa lɛ tiʃɛ], literally Grosbois near Tichey) is a commune in the Côte-d'Or department in eastern France.

== Population ==
Historical population
Year	Pop.	±% p.a.
1968	57	—
1975	46	−3.02%
1982	47	+0.31%
1990	50	+0.78%
1999	42	−1.92%
2007	60	+4.56%
2012	76	+4.84%
2017	77	+0.26%
2023	67	−2.29%
Source: INSEE

== See also ==
- Communes of the Côte-d'Or department
