= Saint-Usage =

Saint-Usage may refer to the following places in France:

- Saint-Usage, Aube, a commune
- Saint-Usage, Côte-d'Or, a commune
