= Brazey-en-Plaine =

- Commune
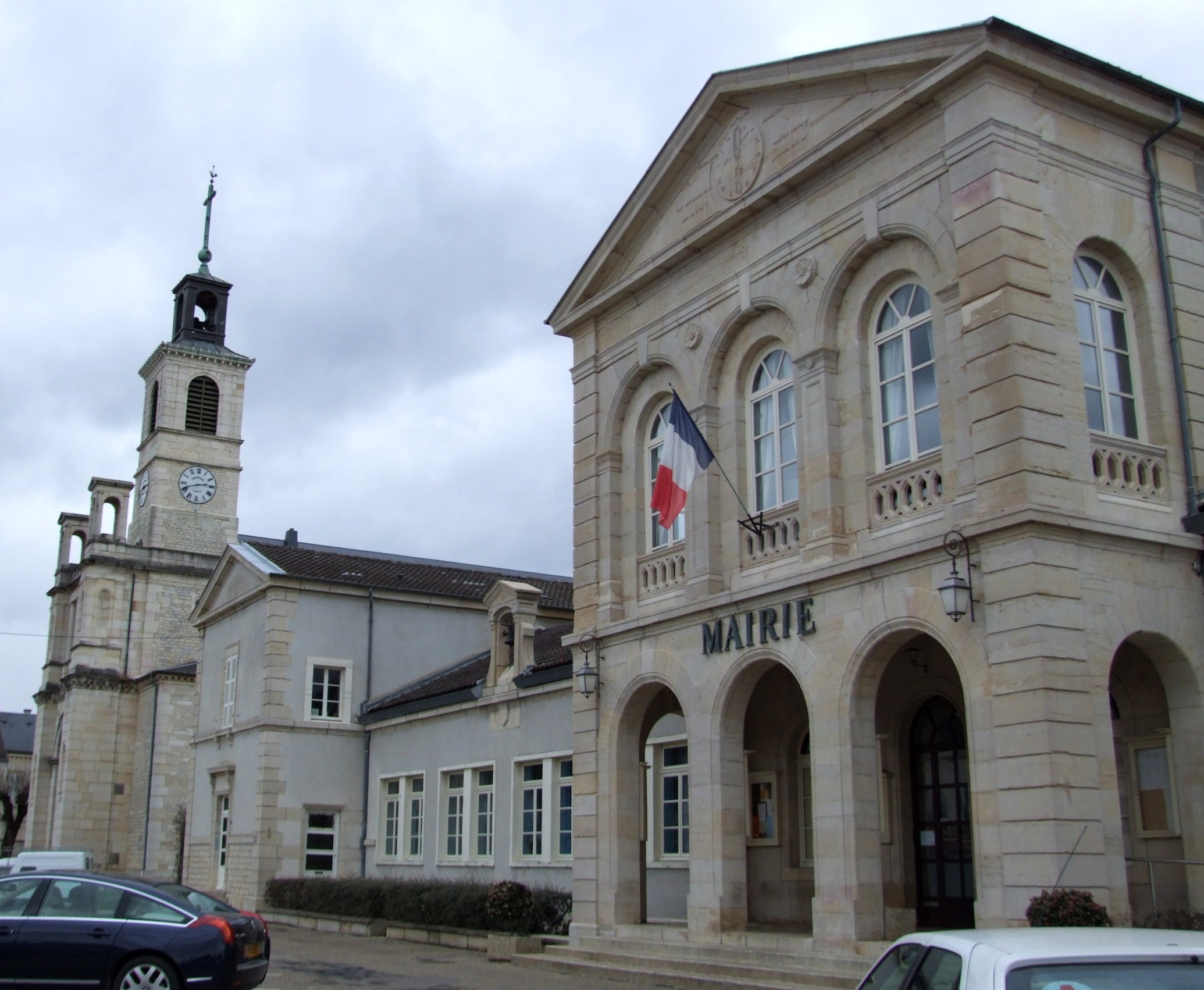
- The town hall in Brazey-en-Plaine

- Coat of arms
- Location of Brazey-en-Plaine
- Location within France Location within Bourgogne-Franche-Comté
- Coordinates: 47°08′09″N 5°13′04″E
- Country: France
- Region: Bourgogne-Franche-Comté
- Department: Côte-d'Or
- Arrondissement: Beaune
- Canton: Brazey-en-Plaine
- Intercommunality: Rives de Saône

Government
  - Mayor (2020–2026): Gilles Delepau
- Area^{1}: 25.55 km^{2} (9.86 sq mi)
- Highest elevation: 202 m (663 ft)
- Lowest elevation: 179 m (587 ft)
- Population (2023): 2,425
  - Density: 94.91/km^{2} (245.8/sq mi)
- Time zone: UTC+01:00 (CET)
  - Summer (DST): UTC+02:00 (CEST)
- INSEE/Postal code: 21103 /21470
- ^{1} French Land Register data, which excludes lakes, ponds, glaciers > 1 km^{2} (0.386 sq mi or 247 acres) and river estuaries.

Brazey-en-Plaine (French pronunciation: [bʁazɛ ɑ̃ plɛn]) is a commune in the Côte-d'Or department in eastern France.

== Population ==
Historical population
Year	Pop.	±% p.a.
1968	1,721	—
1975	2,181	+3.44%
1982	2,415	+1.47%
1990	2,499	+0.43%
1999	2,457	−0.19%
2007	2,565	+0.54%
2012	2,469	−0.76%
2017	2,379	−0.74%
2023	2,425	+0.32%
Source: INSEE

== See also ==
- Communes of the Côte-d'Or department
