= Montot, Côte-d'Or =

Montot
- Commune
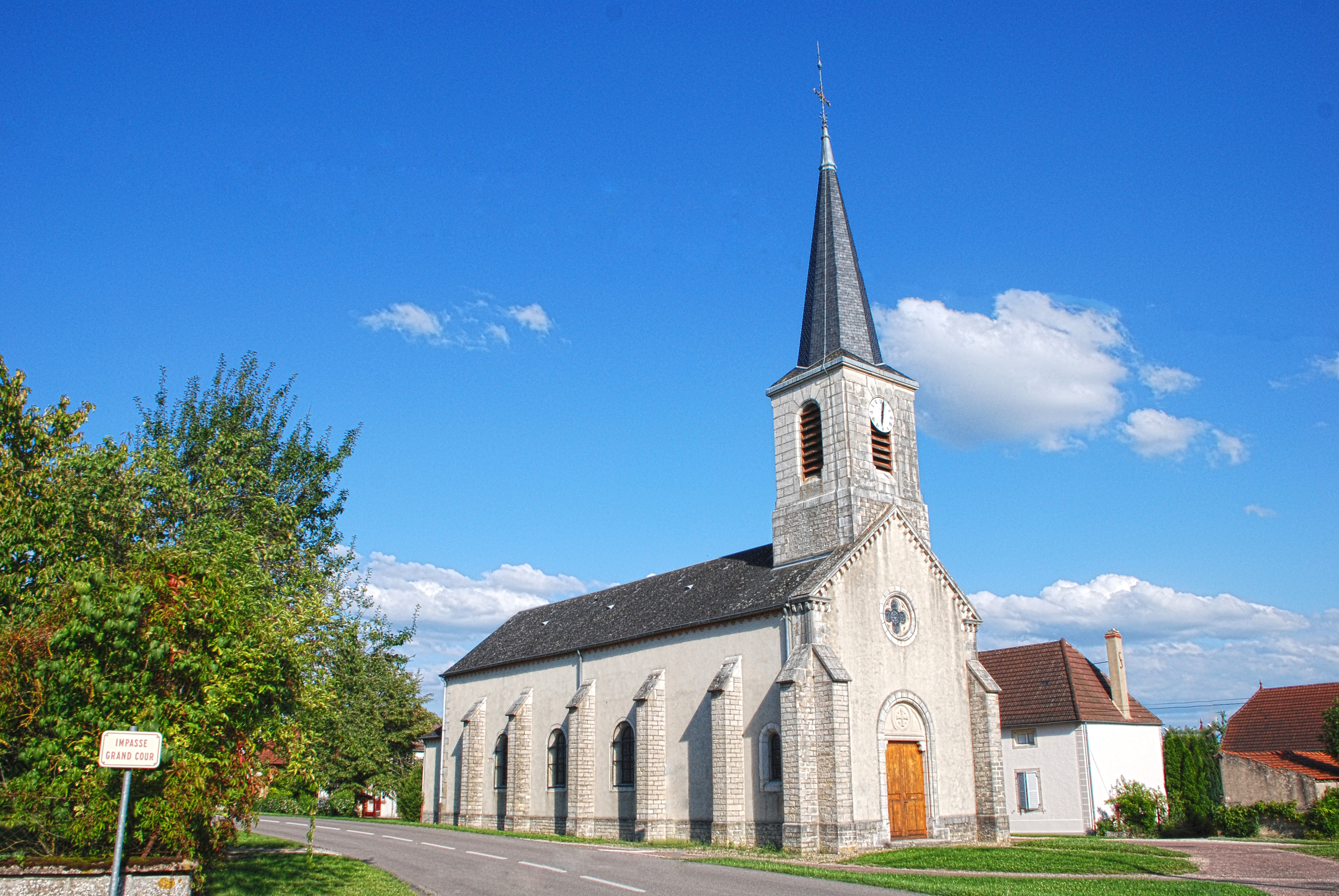
- The church in Montot

- Coat of arms
- Location of Montot
- Location within France Location within Bourgogne-Franche-Comté
- Coordinates: 47°08′31″N 5°14′48″E
- Country: France
- Region: Bourgogne-Franche-Comté
- Department: Côte-d'Or
- Arrondissement: Beaune
- Canton: Brazey-en-Plaine
- Intercommunality: Rives de Saône

Government
  - Mayor (2020–2026): Jocelyne Beaunée
- Area^{1}: 7.51 km^{2} (2.90 sq mi)
- Elevation: 200 m (660 ft)
- Highest elevation: 204 m (669 ft)
- Lowest elevation: 183 m (600 ft)
- Population (2023): 206
  - Density: 27.4/km^{2} (71.0/sq mi)
- Time zone: UTC+01:00 (CET)
  - Summer (DST): UTC+02:00 (CEST)
- INSEE/Postal code: 21440 /21170
- ^{1} French Land Register data, which excludes lakes, ponds, glaciers > 1 km^{2} (0.386 sq mi or 247 acres) and river estuaries.

Montot (French pronunciation: [mɔ̃to]) is a commune in the Côte-d'Or department in eastern France.

== Population ==
Historical population
Year	Pop.	±% p.a.
1968	164	—
1975	140	−2.23%
1982	153	+1.28%
1990	199	+3.34%
1999	203	+0.22%
2007	200	−0.19%
2012	199	−0.10%
2017	197	−0.20%
2023	206	+0.75%
Source: INSEE

== See also ==
- Communes of the Côte-d'Or department
