= Bousselange =

- Commune
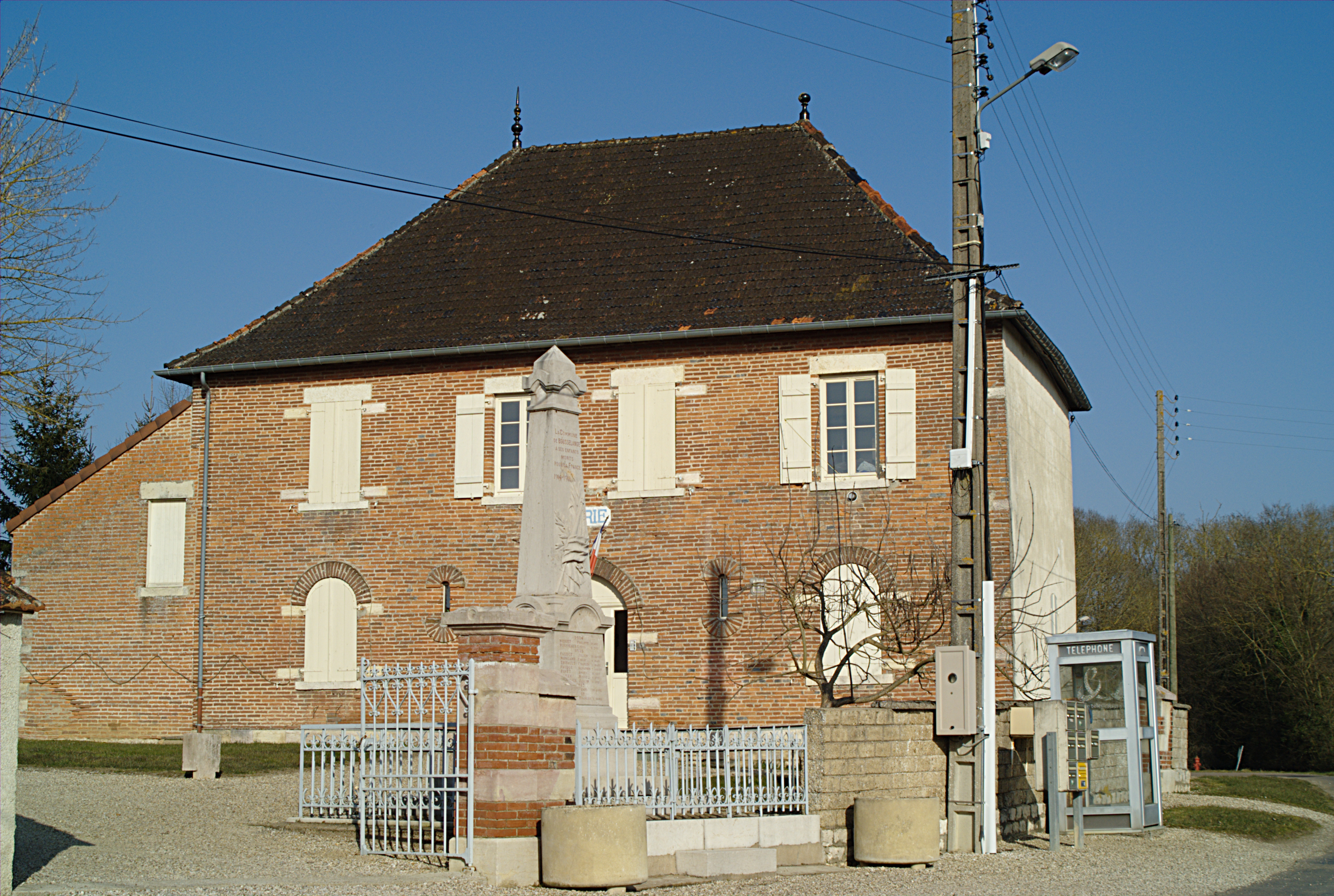
- The town hall in Bousselange
- Location of Bousselange
- Location within France Location within Bourgogne-Franche-Comté
- Coordinates: 46°59′23″N 5°15′39″E
- Country: France
- Region: Bourgogne-Franche-Comté
- Department: Côte-d'Or
- Arrondissement: Beaune
- Canton: Brazey-en-Plaine
- Intercommunality: Rives de Saône

Government
  - Mayor (2020–2026): Jean Luc Faudot
- Area^{1}: 7.2 km^{2} (2.8 sq mi)
- Elevation: 184 m (604 ft)
- Highest elevation: 195 m (640 ft)
- Lowest elevation: 181 m (594 ft)
- Population (2023): 58
  - Density: 8.1/km^{2} (21/sq mi)
- Time zone: UTC+01:00 (CET)
  - Summer (DST): UTC+02:00 (CEST)
- INSEE/Postal code: 21095 /21250
- ^{1} French Land Register data, which excludes lakes, ponds, glaciers > 1 km^{2} (0.386 sq mi or 247 acres) and river estuaries.

Bousselange (French pronunciation: [buslɑ̃ʒ]) is a commune in the Côte-d'Or department in eastern France.

== Population ==
Historical population
Year	Pop.	±% p.a.
1968	88	—
1975	82	−1.00%
1982	76	−1.08%
1990	69	−1.20%
1999	66	−0.49%
2007	56	−2.03%
2012	53	−1.10%
2017	51	−0.77%
2023	58	+2.17%
Source: INSEE

== See also ==
- Communes of the Côte-d'Or department
