= Lanthes =

- Commune
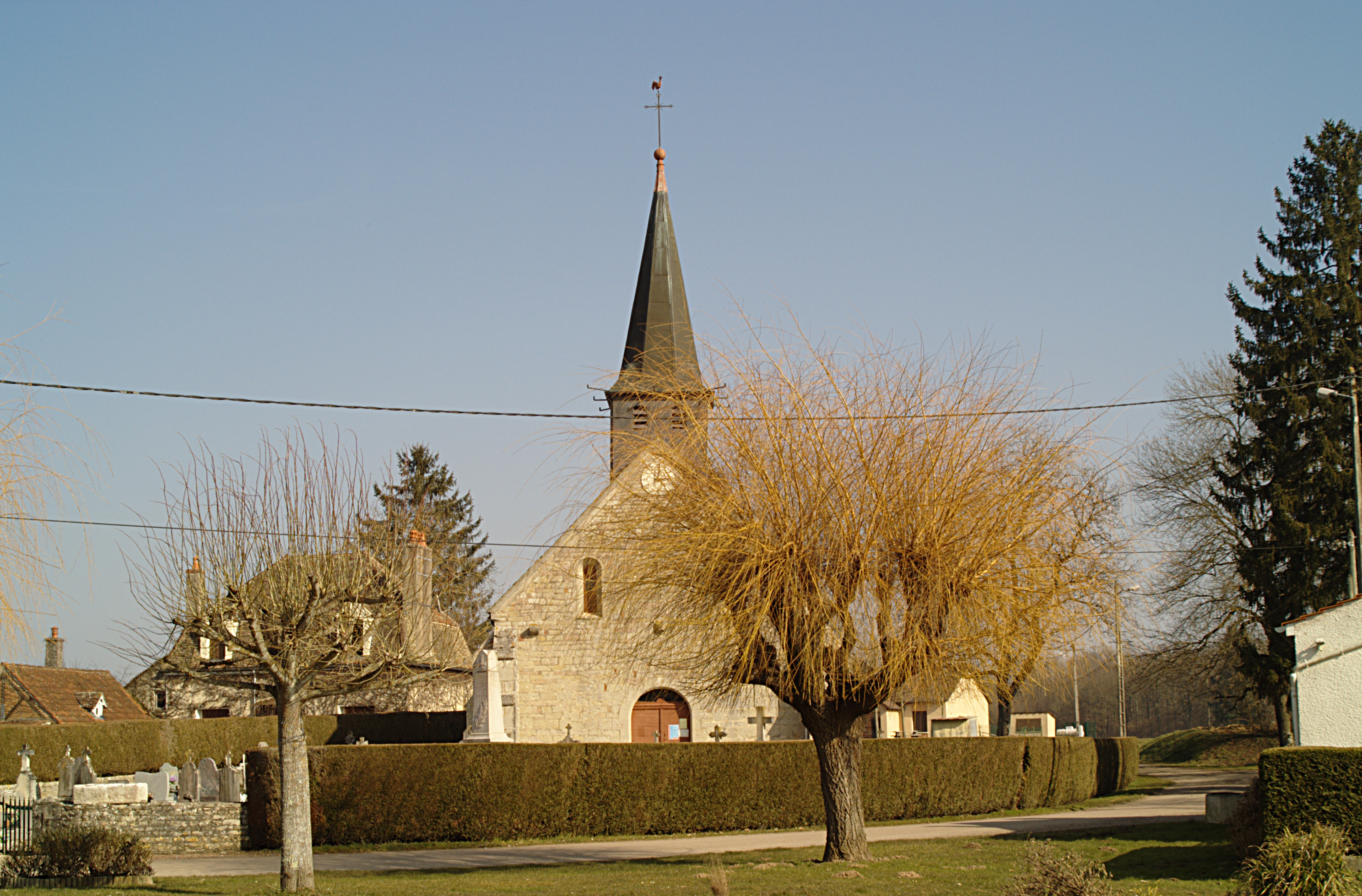
- The church in Lanthes

- Coat of arms
- Location of Lanthes
- Location within France Location within Bourgogne-Franche-Comté
- Coordinates: 46°59′40″N 5°12′16″E
- Country: France
- Region: Bourgogne-Franche-Comté
- Department: Côte-d'Or
- Arrondissement: Beaune
- Canton: Brazey-en-Plaine
- Intercommunality: Rives de Saône

Government
  - Mayor (2020–2026): Anne Rosenblatt-Petitjean
- Area^{1}: 9.79 km^{2} (3.78 sq mi)
- Elevation: 180 m (590 ft)
- Highest elevation: 194 m (636 ft)
- Lowest elevation: 184 m (604 ft)
- Population (2023): 256
  - Density: 26.1/km^{2} (67.7/sq mi)
- Time zone: UTC+01:00 (CET)
  - Summer (DST): UTC+02:00 (CEST)
- INSEE/Postal code: 21340 /21250
- ^{1} French Land Register data, which excludes lakes, ponds, glaciers > 1 km^{2} (0.386 sq mi or 247 acres) and river estuaries.

Lanthes (French pronunciation: [lɑ̃t]) is a commune in the Côte-d'Or department in eastern France.

== Population ==
Historical population
Year	Pop.	±% p.a.
1968	134	—
1975	110	−2.78%
1982	188	+7.96%
1990	204	+1.03%
1999	180	−1.38%
2007	238	+3.55%
2012	253	+1.23%
2017	264	+0.85%
2023	256	−0.51%
Source: INSEE

== See also ==
- Communes of the Côte-d'Or department
