= Trouhans =

- Commune
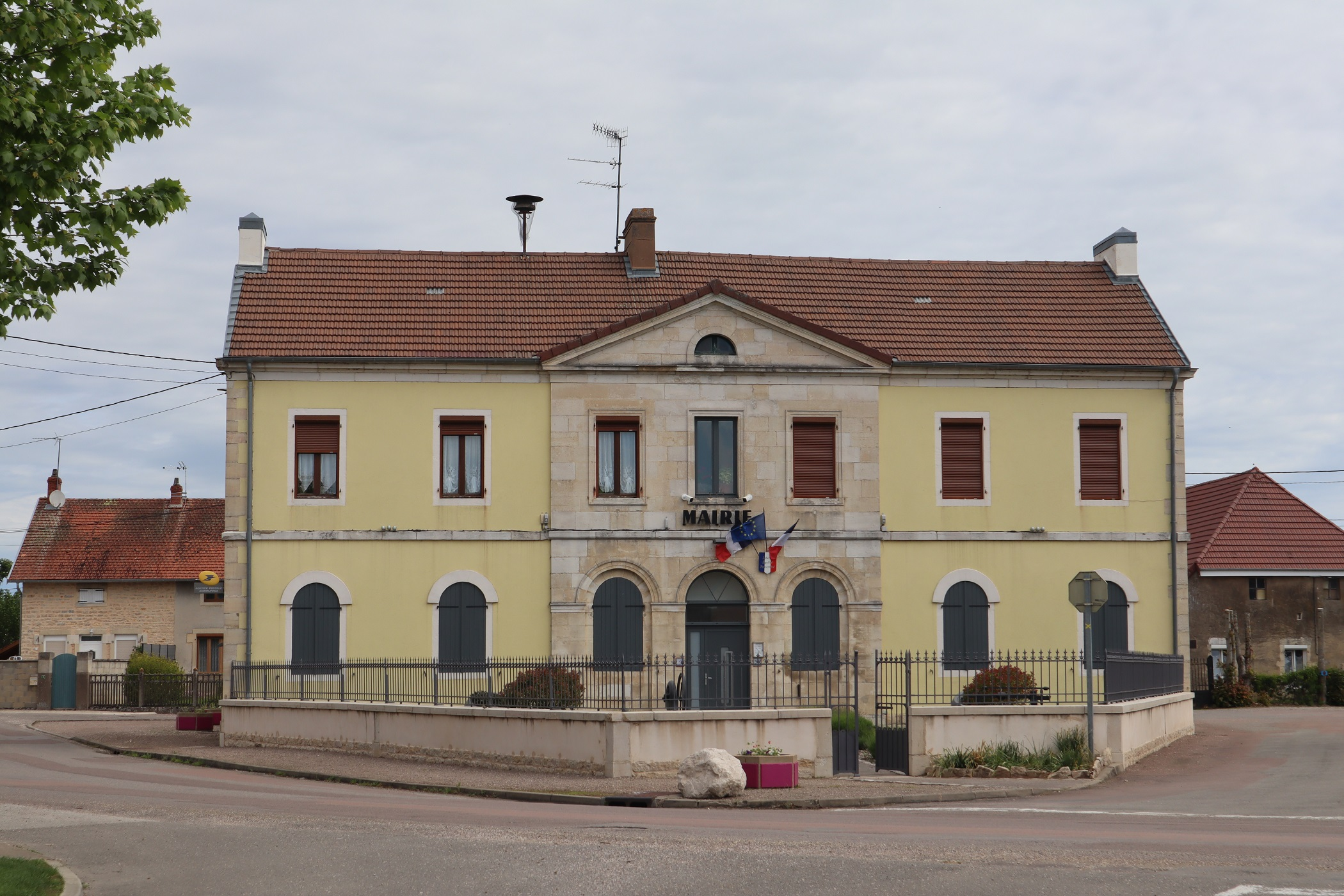
- Town hall
- Location of Trouhans
- Location within France Location within Bourgogne-Franche-Comté
- Coordinates: 47°09′00″N 5°16′30″E
- Country: France
- Region: Bourgogne-Franche-Comté
- Department: Côte-d'Or
- Arrondissement: Beaune
- Canton: Brazey-en-Plaine
- Intercommunality: Rives de Saône

Government
  - Mayor (2022–2026): Jean-François Schwab
- Area^{1}: 10.6 km^{2} (4.1 sq mi)
- Elevation: 187 m (614 ft)
- Highest elevation: 204 m (669 ft)
- Lowest elevation: 182 m (597 ft)
- Population (2023): 621
  - Density: 58.6/km^{2} (152/sq mi)
- Time zone: UTC+01:00 (CET)
  - Summer (DST): UTC+02:00 (CEST)
- INSEE/Postal code: 21645 /21170
- ^{1} French Land Register data, which excludes lakes, ponds, glaciers > 1 km^{2} (0.386 sq mi or 247 acres) and river estuaries.

Trouhans (French pronunciation: [tʁu.ɑ̃]) is a commune in the Côte-d'Or department in eastern France. It is located on the Ouche river, about 35 km south east of Dijon.

== Population ==
Historical population
Year	Pop.	±% p.a.
1968	540	—
1975	508	−0.87%
1982	604	+2.50%
1990	674	+1.38%
1999	628	−0.78%
2007	634	+0.12%
2012	635	+0.03%
2017	606	−0.93%
2023	621	+0.41%
Source: INSEE

== See also ==
- Communes of the Côte-d'Or department
