= Jallanges =

- Commune
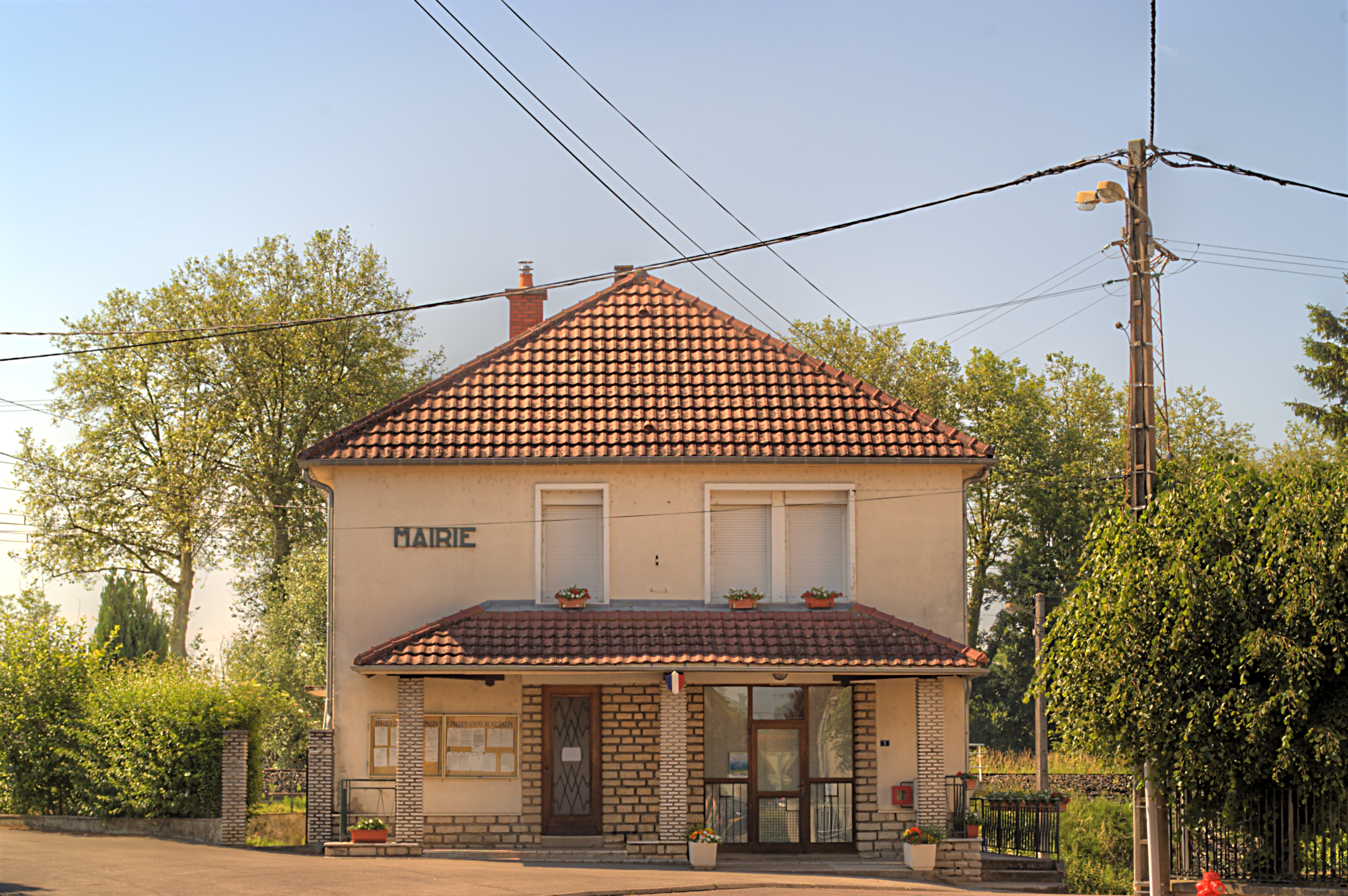
- The town hall in Jallanges
- Location of Jallanges
- Location within France Location within Bourgogne-Franche-Comté
- Coordinates: 46°59′21″N 5°09′03″E
- Country: France
- Region: Bourgogne-Franche-Comté
- Department: Côte-d'Or
- Arrondissement: Beaune
- Canton: Brazey-en-Plaine
- Intercommunality: Rives de Saône

Government
  - Mayor (2020–2026): Gilbert Valentin
- Area^{1}: 7.48 km^{2} (2.89 sq mi)
- Elevation: 188 m (617 ft)
- Highest elevation: 193 m (633 ft)
- Lowest elevation: 175 m (574 ft)
- Population (2023): 310
  - Density: 41/km^{2} (110/sq mi)
- Time zone: UTC+01:00 (CET)
  - Summer (DST): UTC+02:00 (CEST)
- INSEE/Postal code: 21322 /21250
- ^{1} French Land Register data, which excludes lakes, ponds, glaciers > 1 km^{2} (0.386 sq mi or 247 acres) and river estuaries.

Jallanges (French pronunciation: [ʒalɑ̃ʒ]) is a commune in the Côte-d'Or department in eastern France.

== Population ==
Historical population
Year	Pop.	±% p.a.
1968	262	—
1975	306	+2.24%
1982	322	+0.73%
1990	285	−1.51%
1999	261	−0.97%
2007	318	+2.50%
2012	338	+1.23%
2017	323	−0.90%
2023	310	−0.68%
Source: INSEE

== See also ==
- Communes of the Côte-d'Or department
