= Échenon =

- Commune
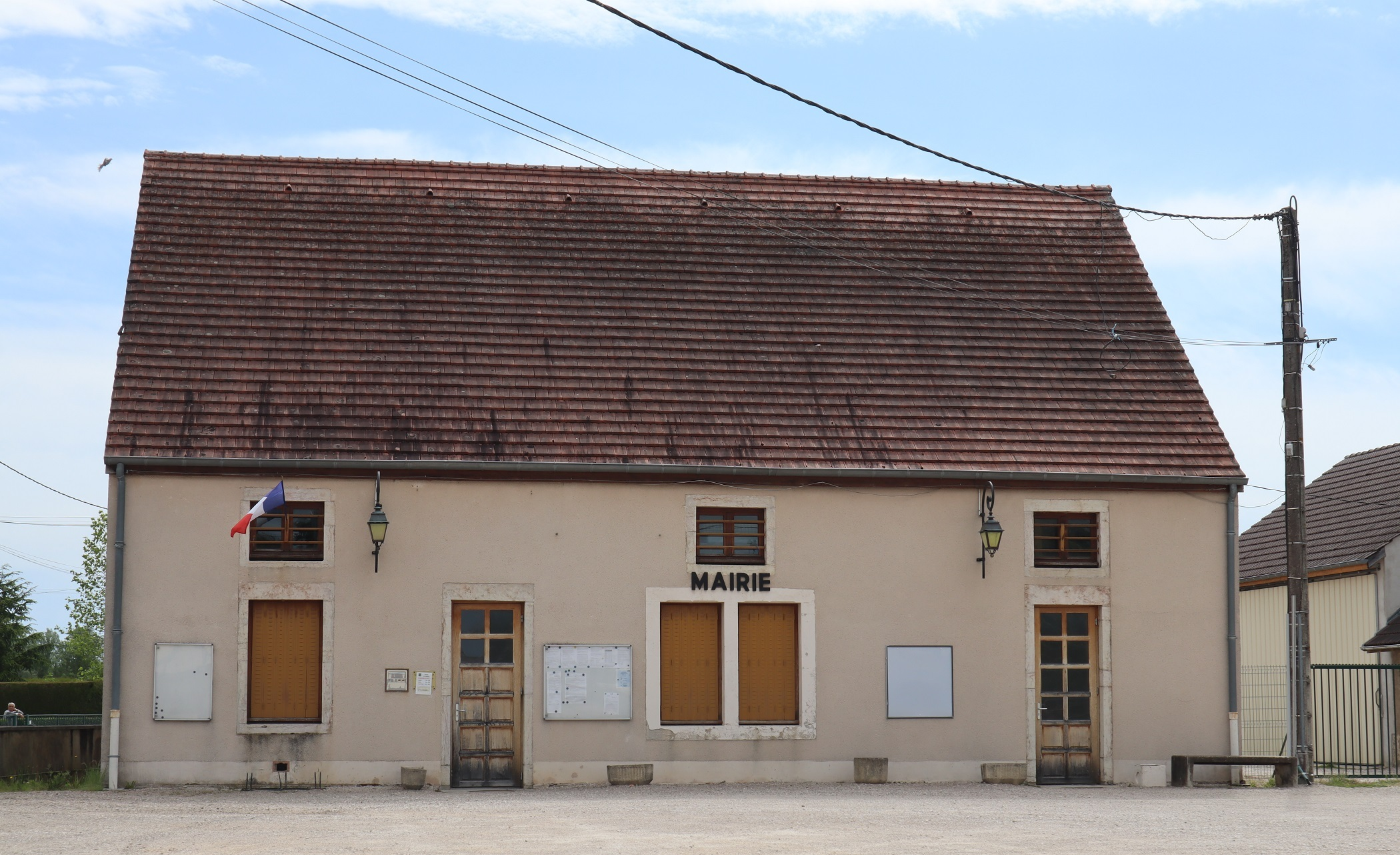
- Town hall

- Coat of arms
- Location of Échenon
- Location within France Location within Bourgogne-Franche-Comté
- Coordinates: 47°06′53″N 5°17′04″E
- Country: France
- Region: Bourgogne-Franche-Comté
- Department: Côte-d'Or
- Arrondissement: Beaune
- Canton: Brazey-en-Plaine
- Intercommunality: Rives de Saône

Government
  - Mayor (2023–2026): Sylvain Antoine
- Area^{1}: 10.62 km^{2} (4.10 sq mi)
- Elevation: 187 m (614 ft)
- Highest elevation: 187 m (614 ft)
- Lowest elevation: 179 m (587 ft)
- Population (2023): 763
  - Density: 71.8/km^{2} (186/sq mi)
- Time zone: UTC+01:00 (CET)
  - Summer (DST): UTC+02:00 (CEST)
- INSEE/Postal code: 21239 /21170
- ^{1} French Land Register data, which excludes lakes, ponds, glaciers > 1 km^{2} (0.386 sq mi or 247 acres) and river estuaries.

Échenon (French pronunciation: [eʃ(ə)nɔ̃]) is a commune in the Côte-d'Or department in eastern France.

== Population ==
Historical population
Year	Pop.	±% p.a.
1968	531	—
1975	700	+4.03%
1982	717	+0.34%
1990	707	−0.18%
1999	652	−0.90%
2007	673	+0.40%
2012	742	+1.97%
2017	775	+0.87%
2023	763	−0.26%
Source: INSEE

== See also ==
- Communes of the Côte-d'Or department
