= Esbarres =

- Commune
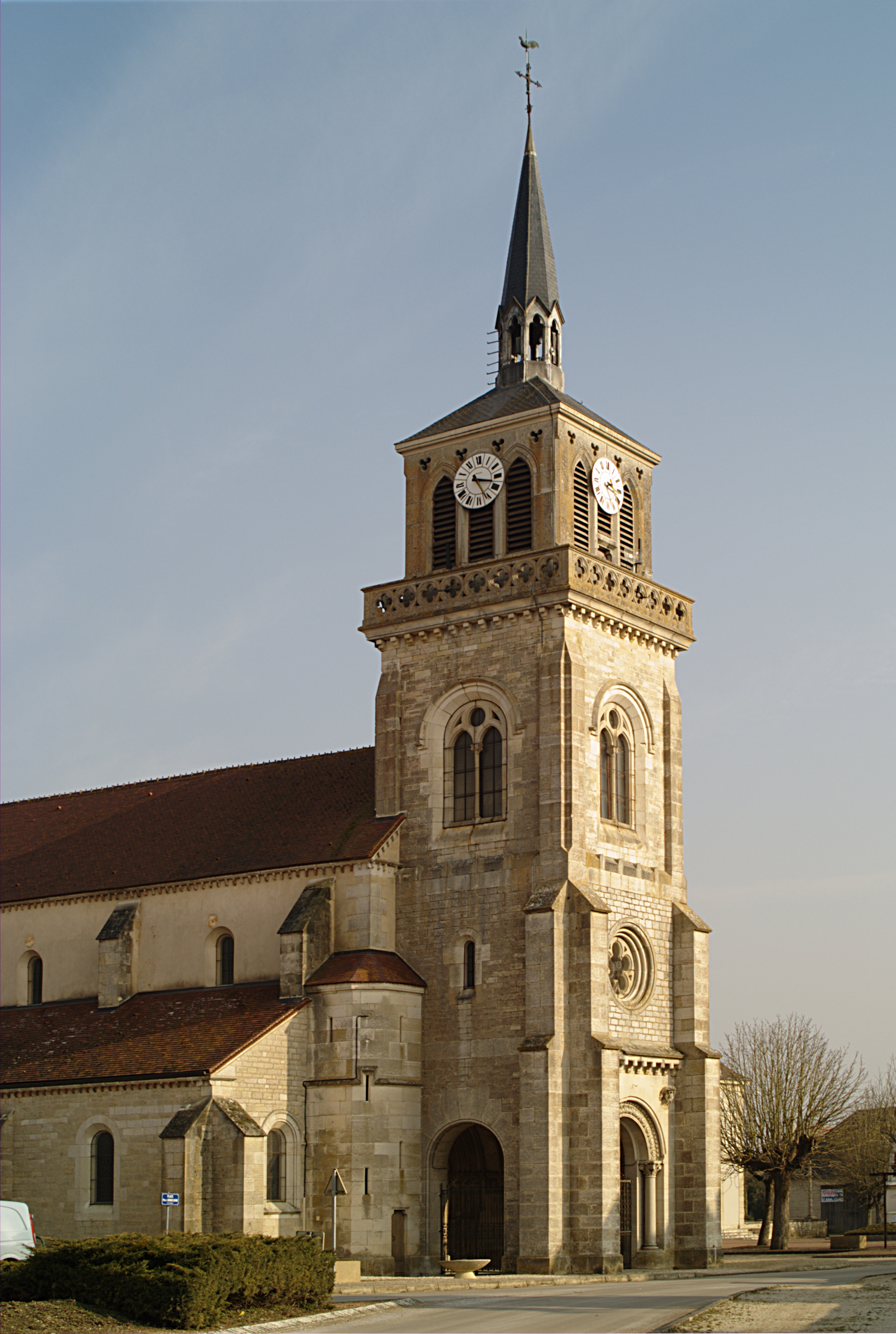
- The church in Esbarres

- Coat of arms
- Location of Esbarres
- Location within France Location within Bourgogne-Franche-Comté
- Coordinates: 47°05′43″N 5°12′56″E
- Country: France
- Region: Bourgogne-Franche-Comté
- Department: Côte-d'Or
- Arrondissement: Beaune
- Canton: Brazey-en-Plaine
- Intercommunality: Rives de Saône

Government
  - Mayor (2020–2026): Stéphanie Mevolhon
- Area^{1}: 15.86 km^{2} (6.12 sq mi)
- Elevation: 190 m (620 ft)
- Highest elevation: 197 m (646 ft)
- Lowest elevation: 177 m (581 ft)
- Population (2023): 689
  - Density: 43.4/km^{2} (113/sq mi)
- Time zone: UTC+01:00 (CET)
  - Summer (DST): UTC+02:00 (CEST)
- INSEE/Postal code: 21249 /21170
- ^{1} French Land Register data, which excludes lakes, ponds, glaciers > 1 km^{2} (0.386 sq mi or 247 acres) and river estuaries.

Esbarres (French pronunciation: [ebaʁ]) is a commune in the Côte-d'Or department in eastern France.

== Population ==
Historical population
Year	Pop.	±% p.a.
1968	653	—
1975	621	−0.72%
1982	633	+0.27%
1990	646	+0.25%
1999	621	−0.44%
2007	748	+2.35%
2012	734	−0.38%
2017	690	−1.23%
2023	689	−0.02%
Source: INSEE

== See also ==
- Communes of the Côte-d'Or department
