= Broin =

- Commune
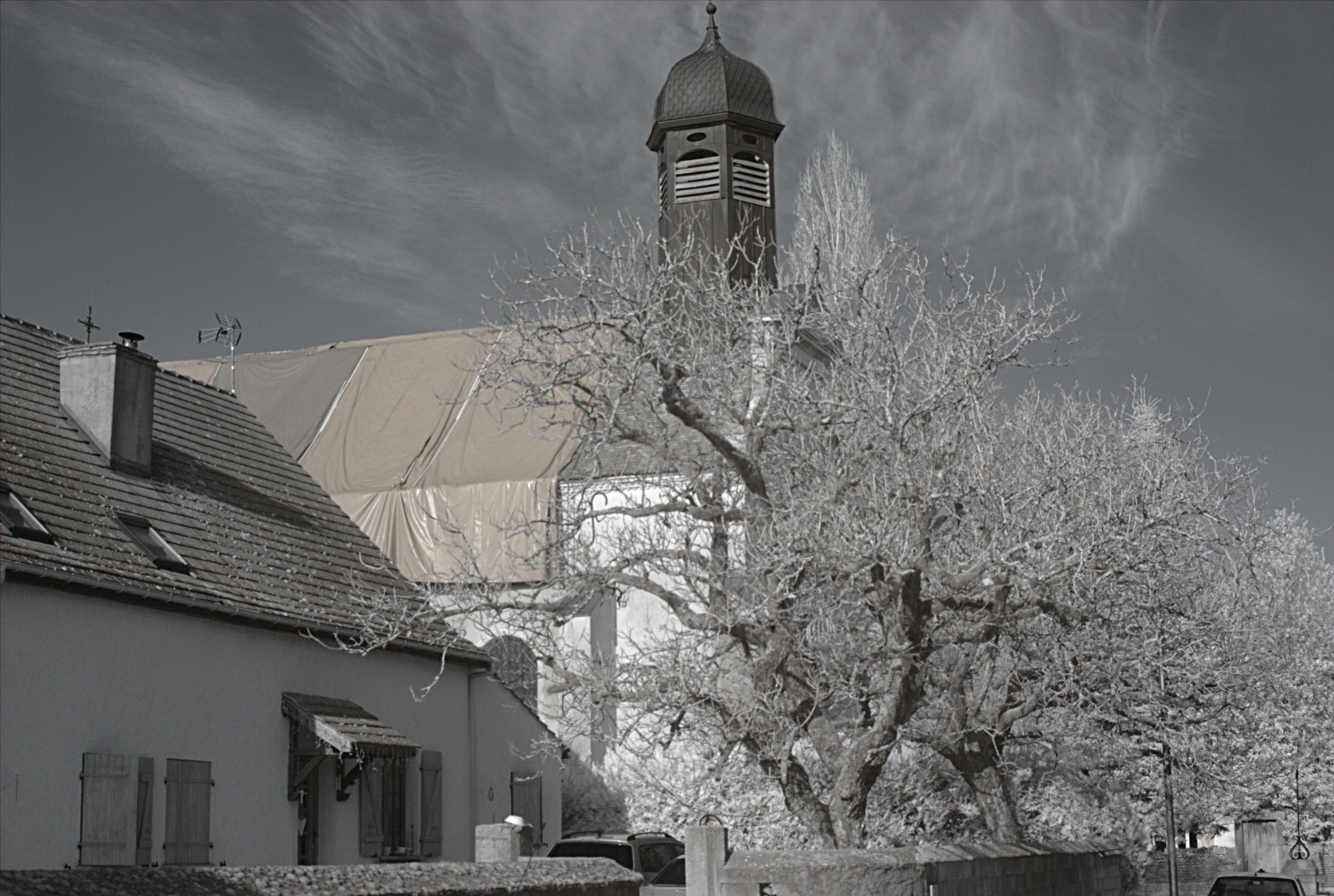
- The church in Broin

- Coat of arms
- Location of Broin
- Location within France Location within Bourgogne-Franche-Comté
- Coordinates: 47°04′47″N 5°06′35″E
- Country: France
- Region: Bourgogne-Franche-Comté
- Department: Côte-d'Or
- Arrondissement: Beaune
- Canton: Brazey-en-Plaine
- Intercommunality: Rives de Saône

Government
  - Mayor (2020–2026): Jean-Christophe Guitton
- Area^{1}: 14.18 km^{2} (5.47 sq mi)
- Elevation: 150 m (490 ft)
- Highest elevation: 227 m (745 ft)
- Lowest elevation: 177 m (581 ft)
- Population (2023): 414
  - Density: 29.2/km^{2} (75.6/sq mi)
- Time zone: UTC+01:00 (CET)
  - Summer (DST): UTC+02:00 (CEST)
- INSEE/Postal code: 21112 /21250
- ^{1} French Land Register data, which excludes lakes, ponds, glaciers > 1 km^{2} (0.386 sq mi or 247 acres) and river estuaries.

Broin (French pronunciation: [bʁwɛ̃]) is a commune in the Côte-d'Or department in eastern France.

== Population ==
Historical population
Year	Pop.	±% p.a.
1968	154	—
1975	192	+3.20%
1982	258	+4.31%
1990	311	+2.36%
1999	317	+0.21%
2007	405	+3.11%
2012	438	+1.58%
2017	429	−0.41%
2023	414	−0.59%
Source: INSEE

== See also ==
- Communes of the Côte-d'Or department
