= Bonnencontre =

- Commune
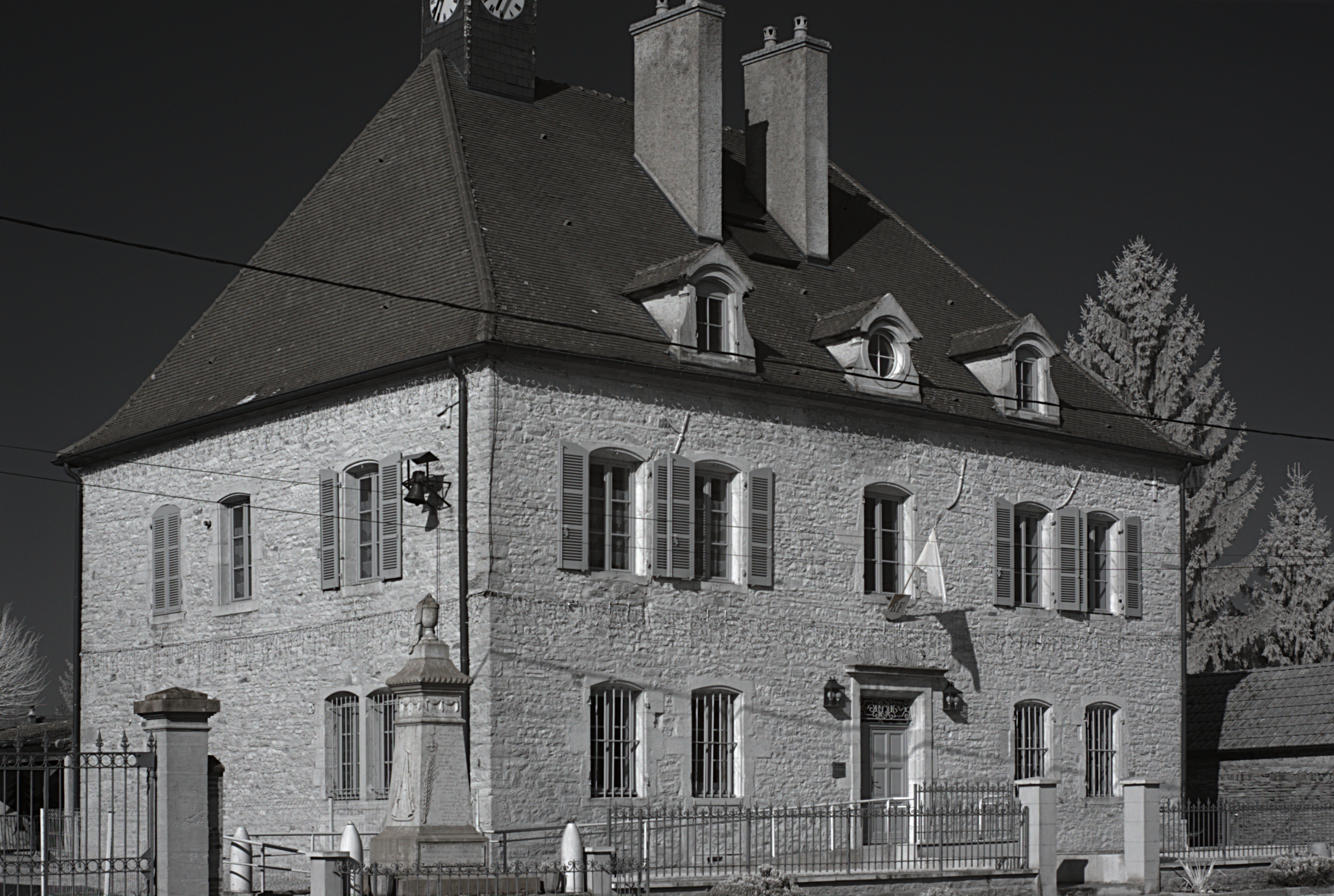
- The town hall in Bonnencontre

- Coat of arms
- Location of Bonnencontre
- Location within France Location within Bourgogne-Franche-Comté
- Coordinates: 47°05′04″N 5°08′54″E
- Country: France
- Region: Bourgogne-Franche-Comté
- Department: Côte-d'Or
- Arrondissement: Beaune
- Canton: Brazey-en-Plaine
- Intercommunality: Rives de Saône

Government
  - Mayor (2020–2026): François Perrin
- Area^{1}: 10.83 km^{2} (4.18 sq mi)
- Elevation: 190 m (620 ft)
- Highest elevation: 226 m (741 ft)
- Lowest elevation: 177 m (581 ft)
- Population (2023): 432
  - Density: 39.9/km^{2} (103/sq mi)
- Time zone: UTC+01:00 (CET)
  - Summer (DST): UTC+02:00 (CEST)
- INSEE/Postal code: 21089 /21250
- ^{1} French Land Register data, which excludes lakes, ponds, glaciers > 1 km^{2} (0.386 sq mi or 247 acres) and river estuaries.

Bonnencontre (French pronunciation: [bɔnɑ̃kɔ̃tʁ]) is a commune in the Côte-d'Or department in eastern France.

== Population ==
Historical population
Year	Pop.	±% p.a.
1968	209	—
1975	202	−0.49%
1982	242	+2.61%
1990	276	+1.66%
1999	343	+2.44%
2007	383	+1.39%
2012	435	+2.58%
2017	445	+0.46%
2023	432	−0.49%
Source: INSEE

== See also ==
- Communes of the Côte-d'Or department
