= Chamblanc =

- Commune
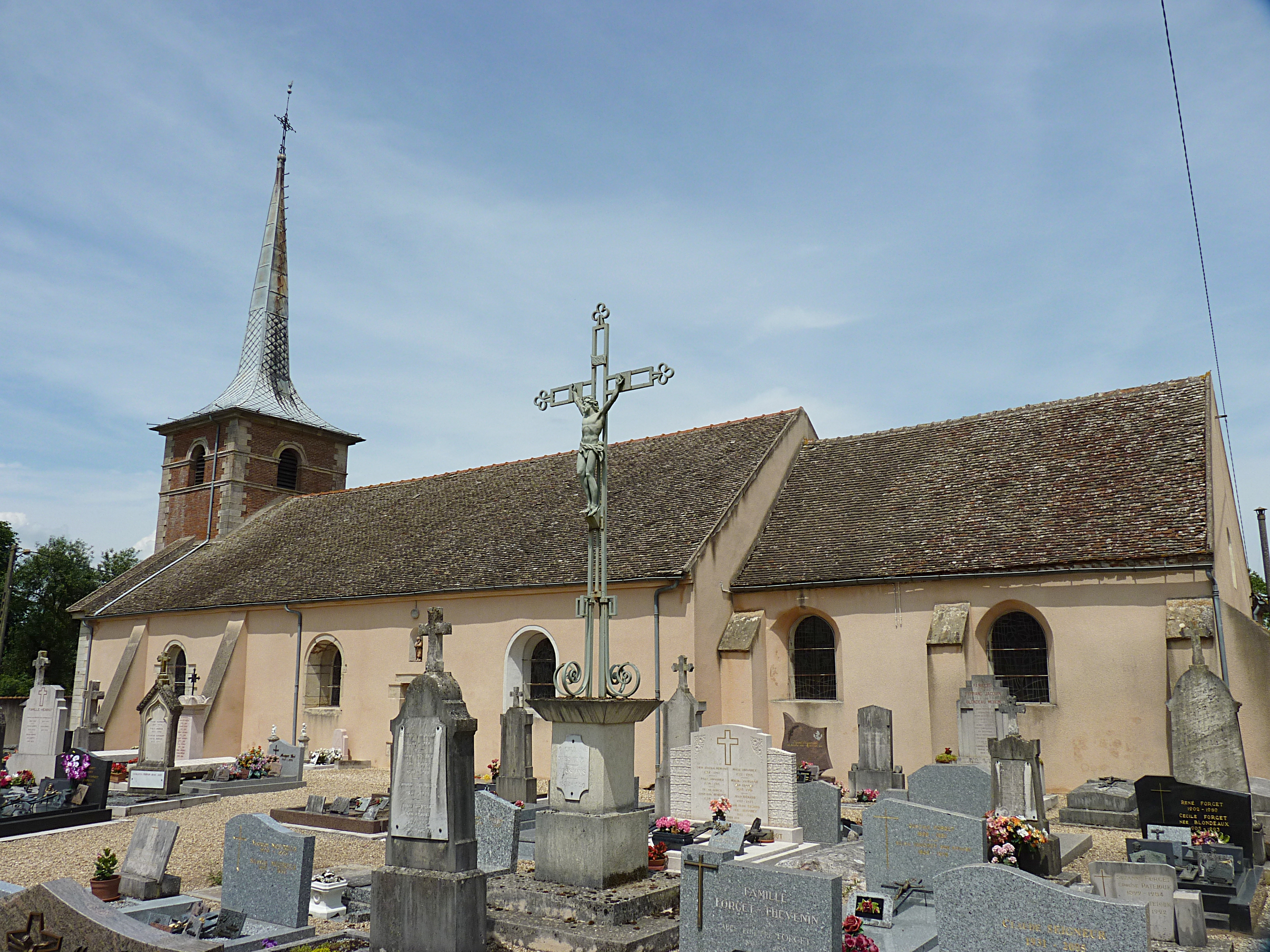
- The church in Chamblanc
- Location of Chamblanc
- Location within France Location within Bourgogne-Franche-Comté
- Coordinates: 47°01′14″N 5°09′04″E
- Country: France
- Region: Bourgogne-Franche-Comté
- Department: Côte-d'Or
- Arrondissement: Beaune
- Canton: Brazey-en-Plaine
- Intercommunality: Rives de Saône

Government
  - Mayor (2024–2026): Sébastien Thevenin
- Area^{1}: 10.21 km^{2} (3.94 sq mi)
- Elevation: 178 m (584 ft)
- Highest elevation: 192 m (630 ft)
- Lowest elevation: 176 m (577 ft)
- Population (2023): 456
  - Density: 44.7/km^{2} (116/sq mi)
- Time zone: UTC+01:00 (CET)
  - Summer (DST): UTC+02:00 (CEST)
- INSEE/Postal code: 21131 /21250
- ^{1} French Land Register data, which excludes lakes, ponds, glaciers > 1 km^{2} (0.386 sq mi or 247 acres) and river estuaries.

Chamblanc (French pronunciation: [ʃɑ̃blɑ̃]) is a commune in the Côte-d'Or department in eastern France.

== Population ==
Historical population
Year	Pop.	±% p.a.
1968	406	—
1975	423	+0.59%
1982	442	+0.63%
1990	397	−1.33%
1999	404	+0.19%
2007	499	+2.68%
2012	493	−0.24%
2017	459	−1.42%
2023	456	−0.11%
Source: INSEE

== See also ==
- Communes of the Côte-d'Or department
