= Trugny =

- Commune
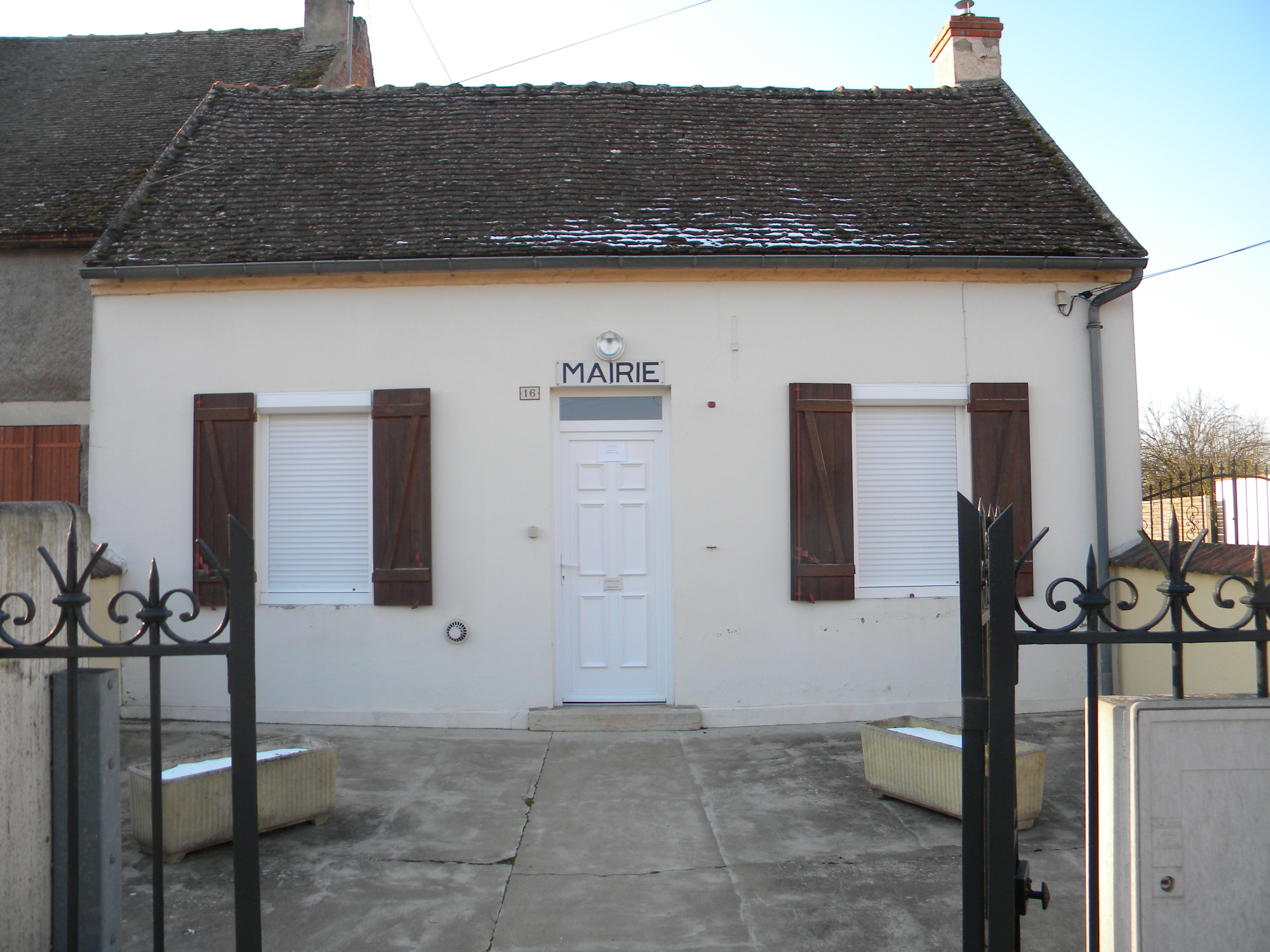
- Town hall
- Location of Trugny
- Location within France Location within Bourgogne-Franche-Comté
- Coordinates: 46°58′59″N 5°08′48″E
- Country: France
- Region: Bourgogne-Franche-Comté
- Department: Côte-d'Or
- Arrondissement: Beaune
- Canton: Brazey-en-Plaine
- Intercommunality: Rives de Saône

Government
  - Mayor (2020–2026): Jean-Michel Verpaux
- Area^{1}: 6.86 km^{2} (2.65 sq mi)
- Elevation: 185 m (607 ft)
- Highest elevation: 193 m (633 ft)
- Lowest elevation: 173 m (568 ft)
- Population (2023): 124
  - Density: 18.1/km^{2} (46.8/sq mi)
- Time zone: UTC+01:00 (CET)
  - Summer (DST): UTC+02:00 (CEST)
- INSEE/Postal code: 21647 /21250
- ^{1} French Land Register data, which excludes lakes, ponds, glaciers > 1 km^{2} (0.386 sq mi or 247 acres) and river estuaries.

Trugny (French pronunciation: [tʁyɲi]) is a commune in the Côte-d'Or department in eastern France.

== Population ==
Historical population
Year	Pop.	±% p.a.
1968	138	—
1975	138	+0.00%
1982	137	−0.10%
1990	151	+1.22%
1999	131	−1.57%
2007	116	−1.51%
2012	126	+1.67%
2017	125	−0.16%
2023	124	−0.13%
Source: INSEE

== See also ==
- Communes of the Côte-d'Or department
