= Pagny-la-Ville =

- Commune
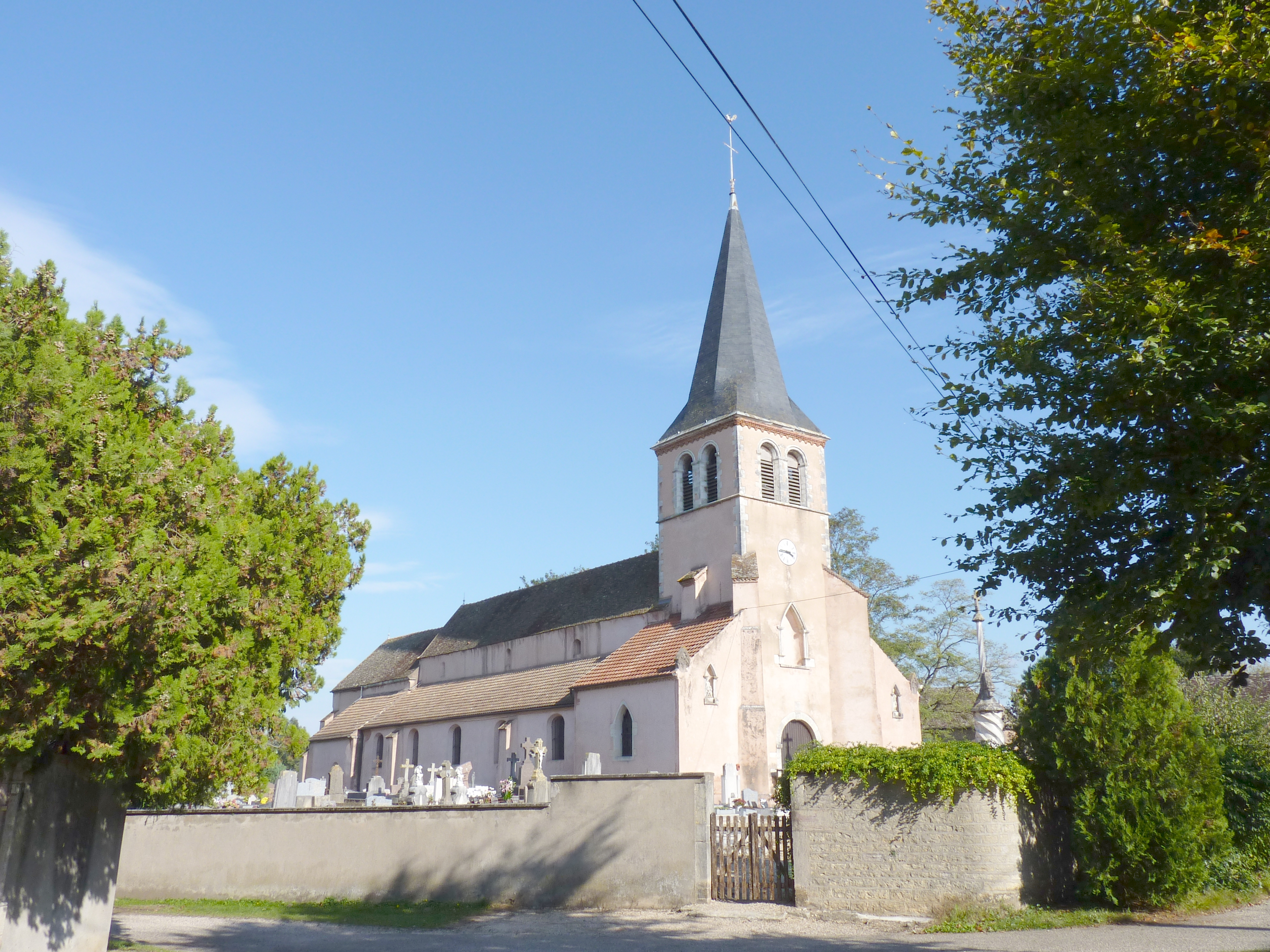
- The church in Pagny-la-Ville

- Coat of arms
- Location of Pagny-la-Ville
- Location within France Location within Bourgogne-Franche-Comté
- Coordinates: 47°03′47″N 5°10′31″E
- Country: France
- Region: Bourgogne-Franche-Comté
- Department: Côte-d'Or
- Arrondissement: Beaune
- Canton: Brazey-en-Plaine
- Intercommunality: Rives de Saône

Government
  - Mayor (2020–2026): Henri Mauchamp
- Area^{1}: 6.73 km^{2} (2.60 sq mi)
- Elevation: 184 m (604 ft)
- Highest elevation: 184 m (604 ft)
- Lowest elevation: 177 m (581 ft)
- Population (2023): 414
  - Density: 61.5/km^{2} (159/sq mi)
- Time zone: UTC+01:00 (CET)
  - Summer (DST): UTC+02:00 (CEST)
- INSEE/Postal code: 21474 /21250
- ^{1} French Land Register data, which excludes lakes, ponds, glaciers > 1 km^{2} (0.386 sq mi or 247 acres) and river estuaries.

Pagny-la-Ville (French pronunciation: [paɲi la vil]) is a commune in the Côte-d'Or department in eastern France.

== Population ==
Historical population
Year	Pop.	±% p.a.
1968	346	—
1975	333	−0.55%
1982	310	−1.02%
1990	316	+0.24%
1999	383	+2.16%
2007	418	+1.10%
2012	408	−0.48%
2017	411	+0.15%
2023	414	+0.12%
Source: INSEE

== See also ==
- Communes of the Côte-d'Or department
