= Labruyère, Côte-d'Or =

Labruyère
- Commune
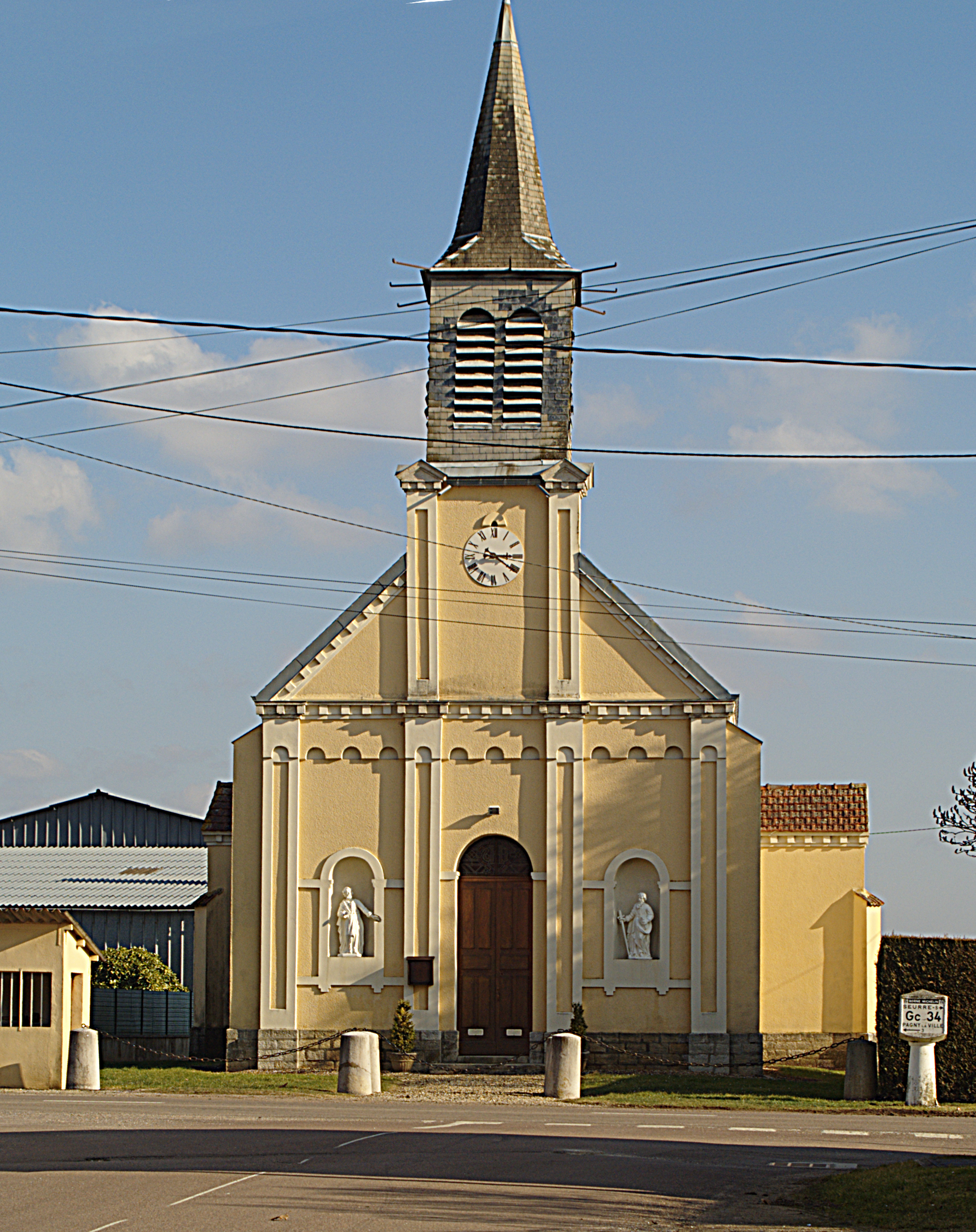
- The church in Labruyère

- Coat of arms
- Location of Labruyère
- Location within France Location within Bourgogne-Franche-Comté
- Coordinates: 47°02′41″N 5°09′03″E
- Country: France
- Region: Bourgogne-Franche-Comté
- Department: Côte-d'Or
- Arrondissement: Beaune
- Canton: Brazey-en-Plaine
- Intercommunality: Rives de Saône

Government
  - Mayor (2020–2026): Céline Gilardet
- Area^{1}: 7.28 km^{2} (2.81 sq mi)
- Elevation: 185 m (607 ft)
- Highest elevation: 183 m (600 ft)
- Lowest elevation: 176 m (577 ft)
- Population (2023): 239
  - Density: 32.8/km^{2} (85.0/sq mi)
- Time zone: UTC+01:00 (CET)
  - Summer (DST): UTC+02:00 (CEST)
- INSEE/Postal code: 21333 /21250
- ^{1} French Land Register data, which excludes lakes, ponds, glaciers > 1 km^{2} (0.386 sq mi or 247 acres) and river estuaries.

Labruyère (French pronunciation: [labʁɥijɛʁ]) is a commune in the Côte-d'Or department in eastern France.

== Population ==
Historical population
| Year | Pop. | ±% p.a. |
|---|---|---|
| 1968 | 179 | — |
| 1975 | 162 | −1.42% |
| 1982 | 146 | −1.47% |
| 1990 | 174 | +2.22% |
| 1999 | 167 | −0.46% |
| 2007 | 203 | +2.47% |
| 2012 | 217 | +1.34% |
| 2017 | 227 | +0.91% |
| 2023 | 239 | +0.86% |
Source: INSEE

== See also ==
- Communes of the Côte-d'Or department
