= Charrey-sur-Saône =

- Commune
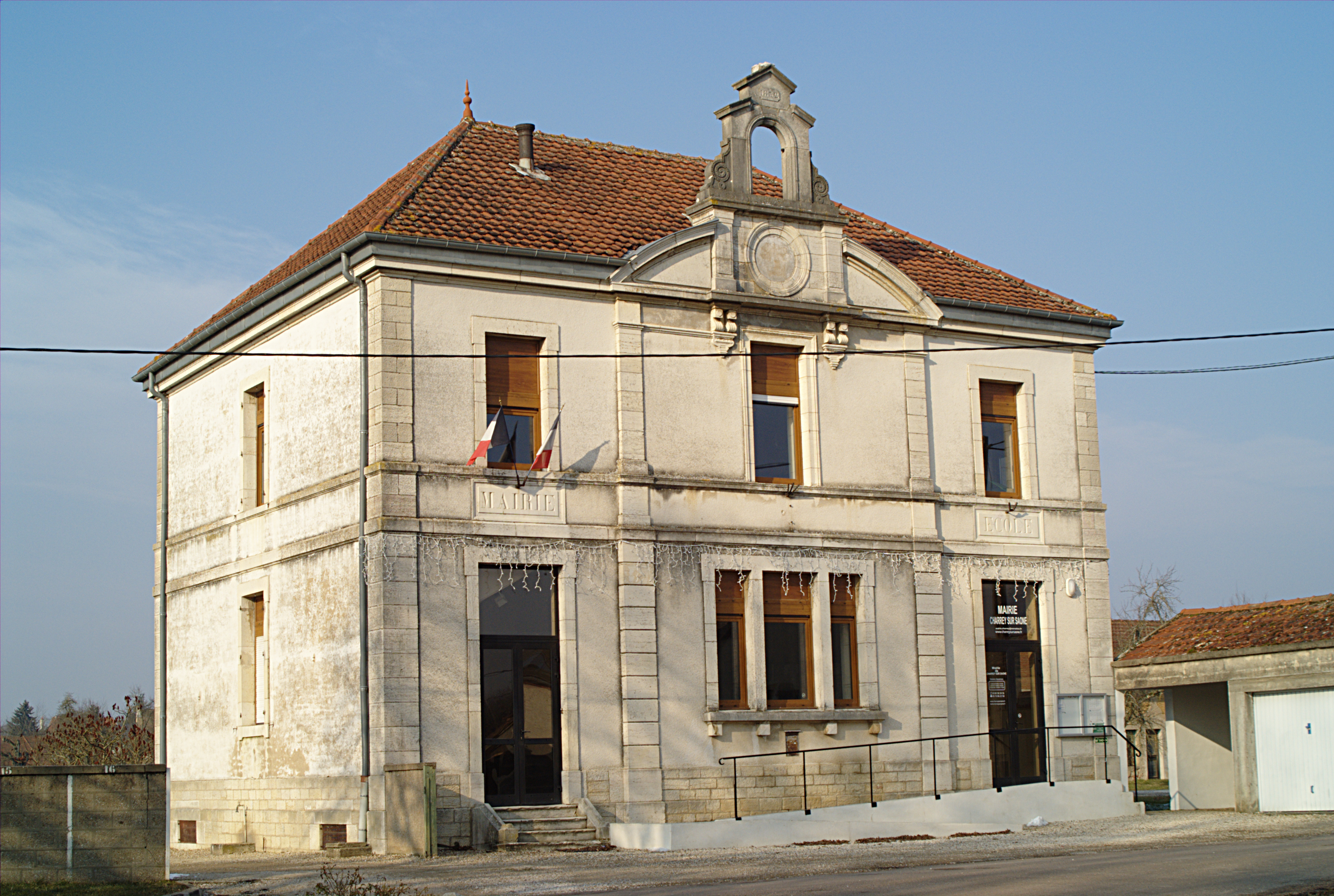
- Town hall
- Location of Charrey-sur-Saône
- Location within France Location within Bourgogne-Franche-Comté
- Coordinates: 47°05′21″N 5°09′51″E
- Country: France
- Region: Bourgogne-Franche-Comté
- Department: Côte-d'Or
- Arrondissement: Beaune
- Canton: Brazey-en-Plaine
- Intercommunality: Rives de Saône

Government
  - Mayor (2020–2026): Sylvain Doisneau
- Area^{1}: 5.75 km^{2} (2.22 sq mi)
- Elevation: 180 m (590 ft)
- Highest elevation: 214 m (702 ft)
- Lowest elevation: 178 m (584 ft)
- Population (2023): 331
  - Density: 57.6/km^{2} (149/sq mi)
- Time zone: UTC+01:00 (CET)
  - Summer (DST): UTC+02:00 (CEST)
- INSEE/Postal code: 21148 /21170
- ^{1} French Land Register data, which excludes lakes, ponds, glaciers > 1 km^{2} (0.386 sq mi or 247 acres) and river estuaries.

Charrey-sur-Saône (French pronunciation: [ʃaʁɛ syʁ son], literally Charrey on Saône) is a commune in the Côte-d'Or department in eastern France.

In October 2016, Charrey-sur-Saône hit the international headlines as one of the first Côte-d'Or villages to be used for the disbursement of refugees and economic migrants from the Calais Jungle.

== Population ==
Historical population
Year	Pop.	±% p.a.
1968	189	—
1975	182	−0.54%
1982	161	−1.74%
1990	180	+1.40%
1999	239	+3.20%
2007	316	+3.55%
2012	352	+2.18%
2017	351	−0.06%
2023	331	−0.97%
Source: INSEE

== See also ==
- Communes of the Côte-d'Or department
