= Lechâtelet =

- Commune
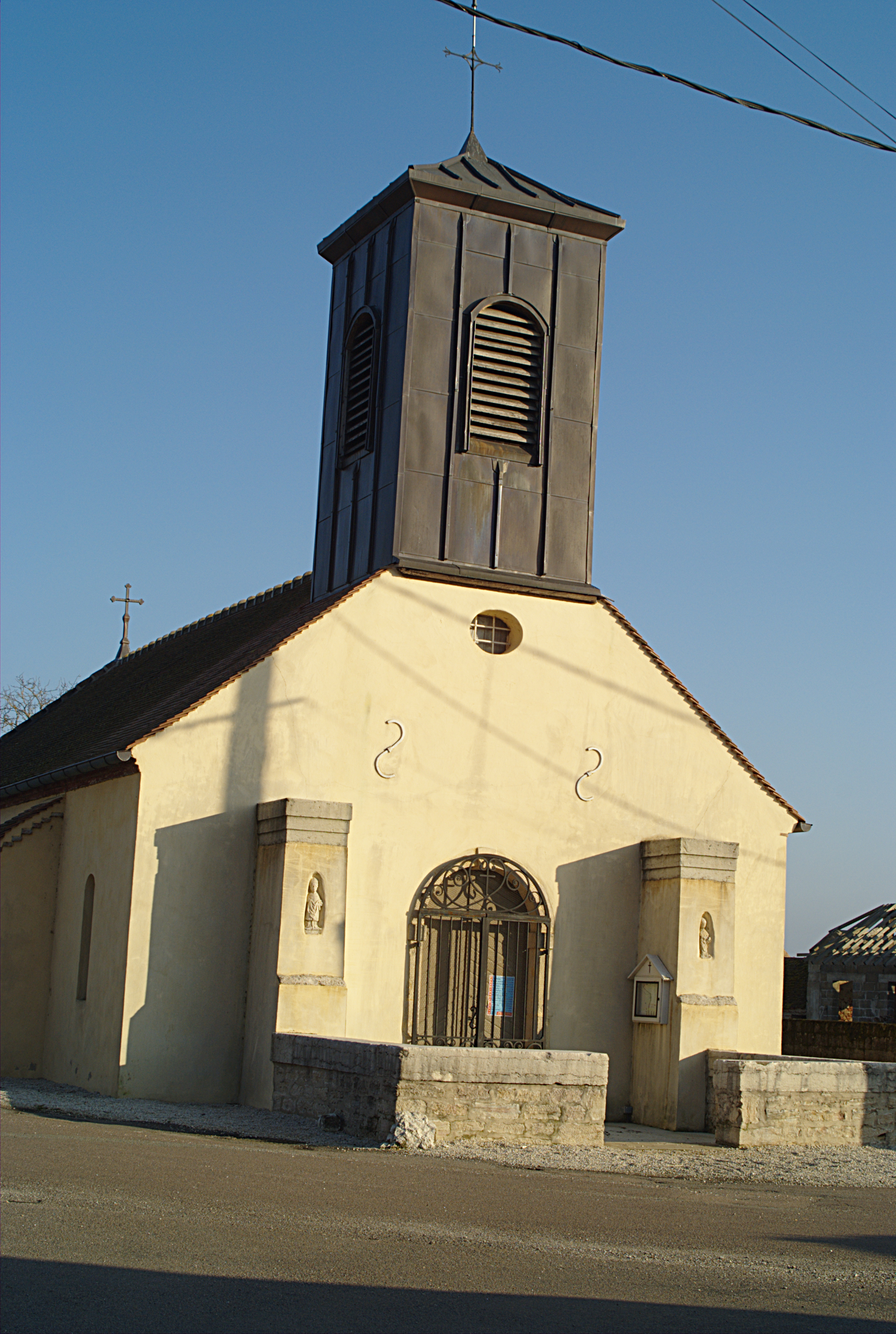
- The church in Lechâtelet

- Coat of arms
- Location of Lechâtelet
- Location within France Location within Bourgogne-Franche-Comté
- Coordinates: 47°03′41″N 5°08′42″E
- Country: France
- Region: Bourgogne-Franche-Comté
- Department: Côte-d'Or
- Arrondissement: Beaune
- Canton: Brazey-en-Plaine
- Intercommunality: Rives de Saône

Government
  - Mayor (2020–2026): Jean-Paul Chapuis
- Area^{1}: 3.64 km^{2} (1.41 sq mi)
- Elevation: 185 m (607 ft)
- Highest elevation: 183 m (600 ft)
- Lowest elevation: 176 m (577 ft)
- Population (2023): 228
  - Density: 62.6/km^{2} (162/sq mi)
- Time zone: UTC+01:00 (CET)
  - Summer (DST): UTC+02:00 (CEST)
- INSEE/Postal code: 21344 /21250
- ^{1} French Land Register data, which excludes lakes, ponds, glaciers > 1 km^{2} (0.386 sq mi or 247 acres) and river estuaries.

Lechâtelet (French pronunciation: [ləʃatlɛ]) is a commune in the Côte-d'Or department in eastern France.

== Population ==
Historical population
Year	Pop.	±% p.a.
1968	127	—
1975	110	−2.03%
1982	108	−0.26%
1990	125	+1.84%
1999	178	+4.01%
2007	204	+1.72%
2012	210	+0.58%
2017	225	+1.39%
2023	228	+0.22%
Source: INSEE

== See also ==
- Communes of the Côte-d'Or department
