= Chivres =

- Commune
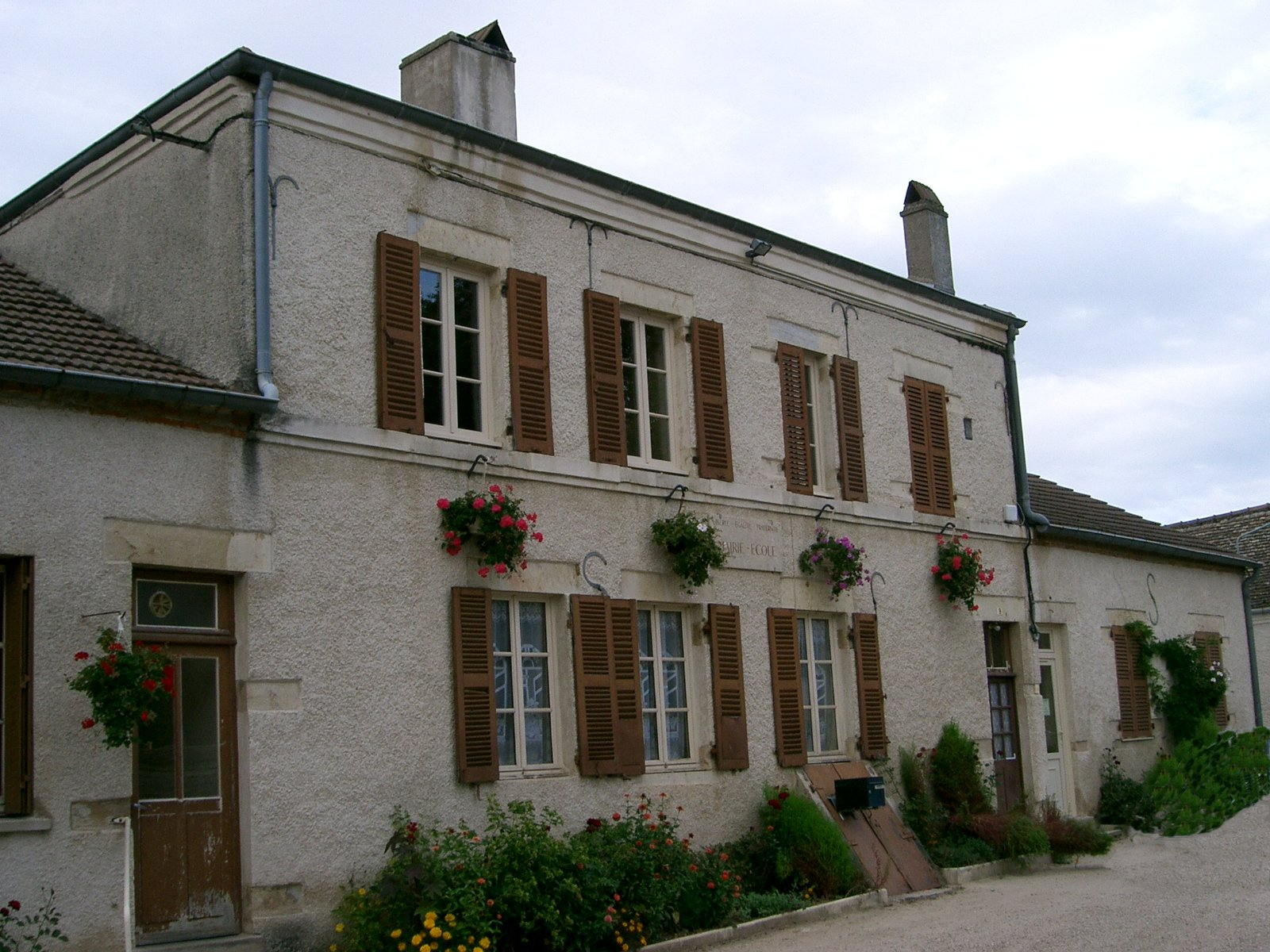
- Town hall and school
- Location of Chivres
- Location within France Location within Bourgogne-Franche-Comté
- Coordinates: 46°58′37″N 5°05′48″E
- Country: France
- Region: Bourgogne-Franche-Comté
- Department: Côte-d'Or
- Arrondissement: Beaune
- Canton: Brazey-en-Plaine
- Intercommunality: Rives de Saône

Government
  - Mayor (2020–2026): Jean-Marc Chapuis
- Area^{1}: 8.23 km^{2} (3.18 sq mi)
- Elevation: 182 m (597 ft)
- Highest elevation: 204 m (669 ft)
- Lowest elevation: 173 m (568 ft)
- Population (2023): 273
  - Density: 33.2/km^{2} (85.9/sq mi)
- Time zone: UTC+01:00 (CET)
  - Summer (DST): UTC+02:00 (CEST)
- INSEE/Postal code: 21172 /21820
- ^{1} French Land Register data, which excludes lakes, ponds, glaciers > 1 km^{2} (0.386 sq mi or 247 acres) and river estuaries.

Chivres (French pronunciation: [ʃivʁ]) is a commune in the Côte-d'Or department in eastern France.

== Population ==
Historical population
Year	Pop.	±% p.a.
1968	240	—
1975	216	−1.49%
1982	224	+0.52%
1990	195	−1.72%
1999	207	+0.67%
2007	238	+1.76%
2012	272	+2.71%
2017	299	+1.91%
2023	273	−1.50%
Source: INSEE

== See also ==
- Communes of the Côte-d'Or department
