= Canton of Brazey-en-Plaine =

Coordinates: 47.13°N 5.22°E

The canton of Brazey-en-Plaine is an administrative division of the Côte-d'Or department, eastern France. It was created at the French canton reorganisation which came into effect in March 2015. Its seat is in Brazey-en-Plaine.

It consists of the following communes:

1. Aubigny-en-Plaine
2. Auvillars-sur-Saône
3. Bagnot
4. Bonnencontre
5. Bousselange
6. Brazey-en-Plaine
7. Broin
8. Chamblanc
9. Charrey-sur-Saône
10. Chivres
11. Échenon
12. Esbarres
13. Franxault
14. Glanon
15. Grosbois-lès-Tichey
16. Jallanges
17. Labergement-lès-Seurre
18. Labruyère
19. Lanthes
20. Laperrière-sur-Saône
21. Lechâtelet
22. Losne
23. Magny-lès-Aubigny
24. Montagny-lès-Seurre
25. Montmain
26. Montot
27. Pagny-la-Ville
28. Pagny-le-Château
29. Pouilly-sur-Saône
30. Saint-Jean-de-Losne
31. Saint-Seine-en-Bâche
32. Saint-Symphorien-sur-Saône
33. Saint-Usage
34. Samerey
35. Seurre
36. Tichey
37. Trouhans
38. Trugny
