= Saint-Seine-en-Bâche =

- Commune
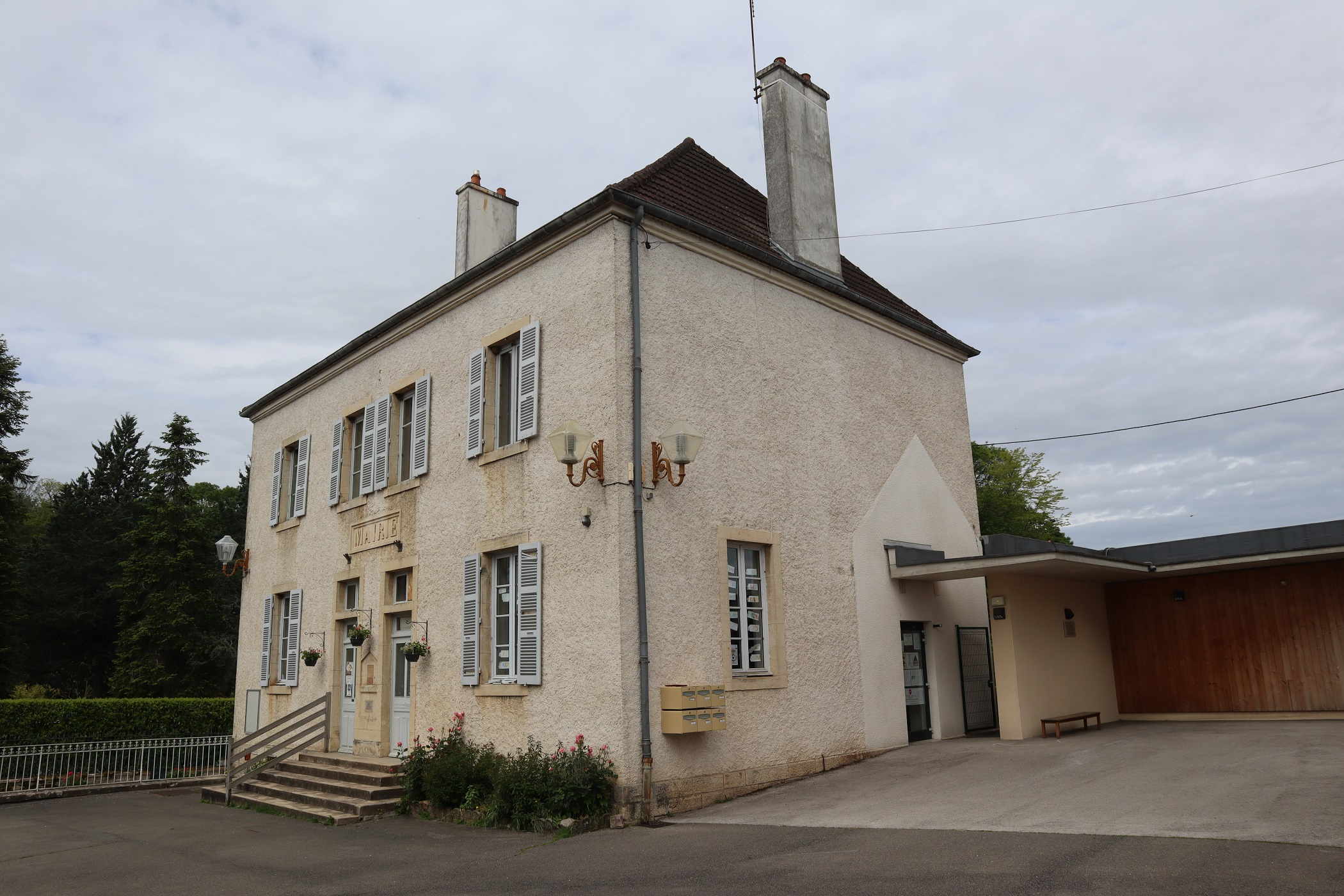
- Town hall
- Location of Saint-Seine-en-Bâche
- Location within France Location within Bourgogne-Franche-Comté
- Coordinates: 47°07′15″N 5°22′18″E
- Country: France
- Region: Bourgogne-Franche-Comté
- Department: Côte-d'Or
- Arrondissement: Beaune
- Canton: Brazey-en-Plaine
- Intercommunality: Rives de Saône

Government
  - Mayor (2020–2026): Claudine Labouebe
- Area^{1}: 8.38 km^{2} (3.24 sq mi)
- Highest elevation: 207 m (679 ft)
- Lowest elevation: 180 m (590 ft)
- Population (2023): 407
  - Density: 48.6/km^{2} (126/sq mi)
- Time zone: UTC+01:00 (CET)
  - Summer (DST): UTC+02:00 (CEST)
- INSEE/Postal code: 21572 /21130
- ^{1} French Land Register data, which excludes lakes, ponds, glaciers > 1 km^{2} (0.386 sq mi or 247 acres) and river estuaries.

Saint-Seine-en-Bâche (French pronunciation: [sɛ̃ sɛn ɑ̃ baʃ]) is a commune in the Côte-d'Or department in eastern France.

== Population ==
Historical population
Year	Pop.	±% p.a.
1968	202	—
1975	167	−2.68%
1982	171	+0.34%
1990	186	+1.06%
1999	232	+2.49%
2007	274	+2.10%
2012	294	+1.42%
2017	408	+6.77%
2023	407	−0.04%
Source: INSEE

== See also ==
- Communes of the Côte-d'Or department
