= Labergement-lès-Seurre =

- Commune
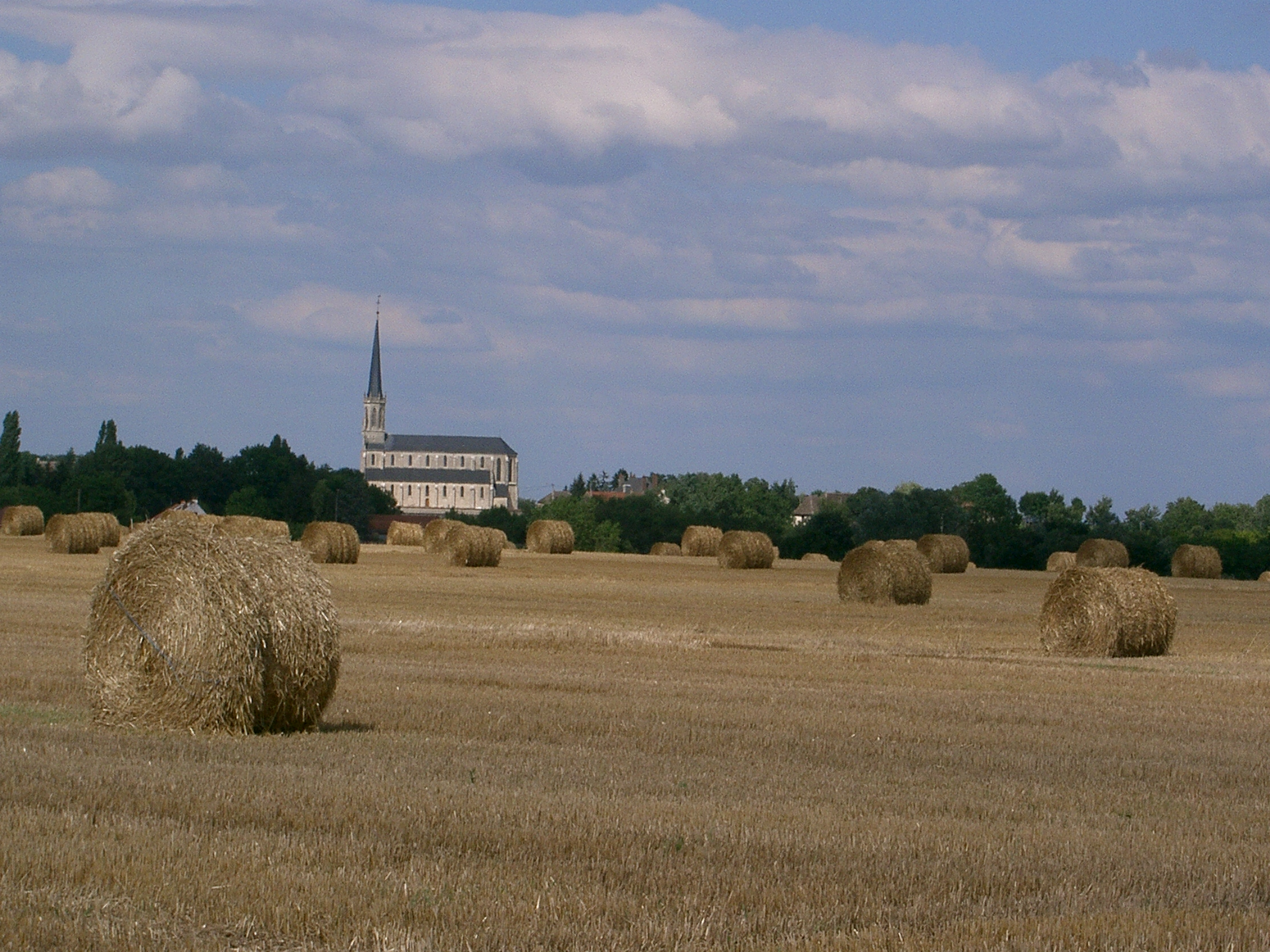
- The church and surroundings in Labergement-lès-Seurre
- Location of Labergement-lès-Seurre
- Location within France Location within Bourgogne-Franche-Comté
- Coordinates: 46°59′56″N 5°05′36″E
- Country: France
- Region: Bourgogne-Franche-Comté
- Department: Côte-d'Or
- Arrondissement: Beaune
- Canton: Brazey-en-Plaine
- Intercommunality: Rives de Saône

Government
  - Mayor (2020–2026): Joëlle Dufour
- Area^{1}: 28.83 km^{2} (11.13 sq mi)
- Elevation: 208 m (682 ft)
- Highest elevation: 211 m (692 ft)
- Lowest elevation: 174 m (571 ft)
- Population (2023): 1,006
  - Density: 34.89/km^{2} (90.38/sq mi)
- Time zone: UTC+01:00 (CET)
  - Summer (DST): UTC+02:00 (CEST)
- INSEE/Postal code: 21332 /21820
- ^{1} French Land Register data, which excludes lakes, ponds, glaciers > 1 km^{2} (0.386 sq mi or 247 acres) and river estuaries.

Labergement-lès-Seurre (French pronunciation: [labɛʁʒəmɑ̃ lɛ sœʁ], literally Labergement near Seurre) is a commune in the Côte-d'Or department in eastern France.

== Population ==
Historical population
Year	Pop.	±% p.a.
1968	718	—
1975	663	−1.13%
1982	723	+1.25%
1990	785	+1.03%
1999	795	+0.14%
2007	910	+1.70%
2012	1,010	+2.11%
2017	995	−0.30%
2023	1,006	+0.18%
Source: INSEE

== See also ==
- Communes of the Côte-d'Or department
