= Pouilly-sur-Saône =

- Commune
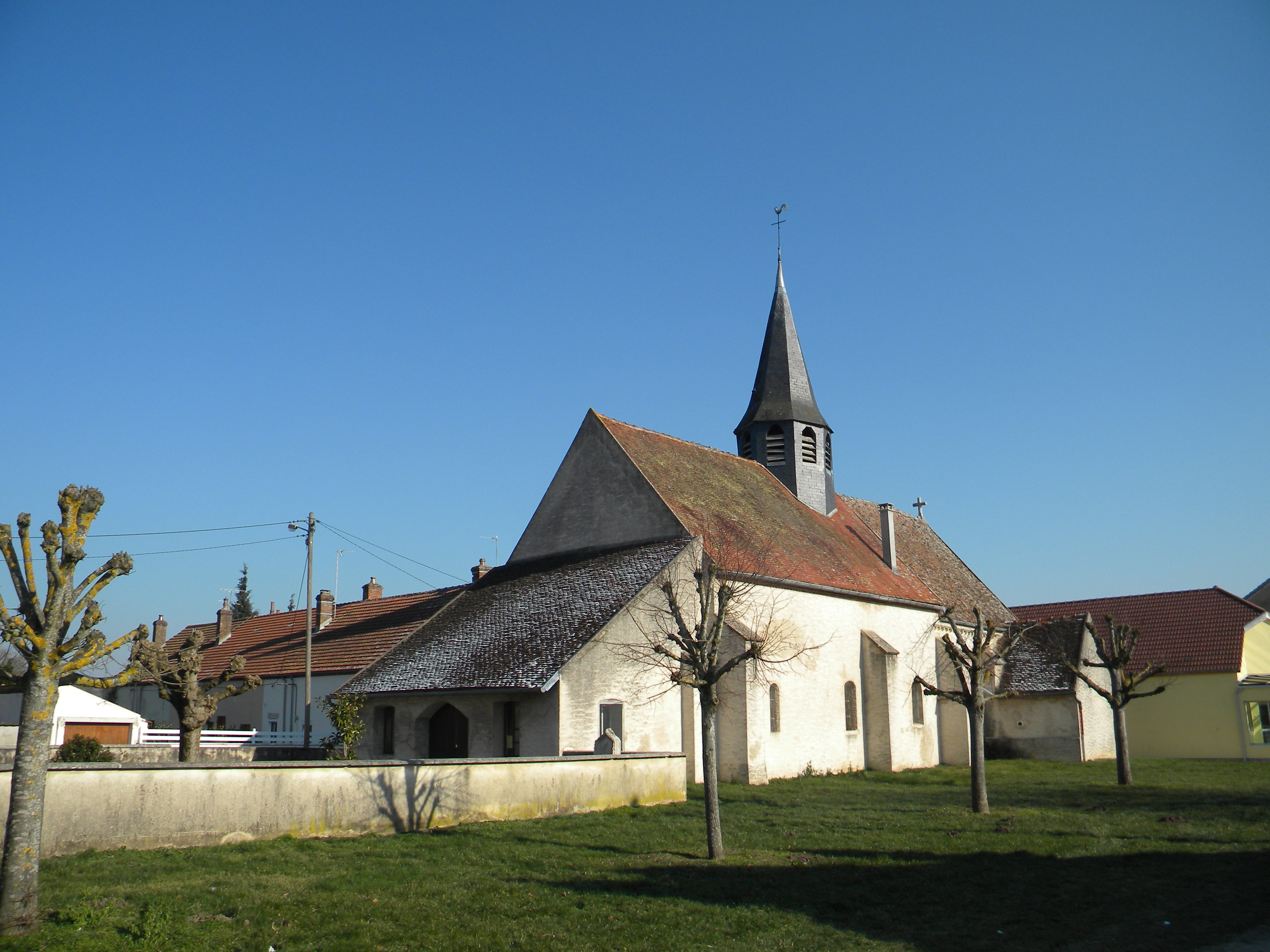
- The church in Pouilly-sur-Saône

- Coat of arms
- Location of Pouilly-sur-Saône
- Location within France Location within Bourgogne-Franche-Comté
- Coordinates: 47°01′09″N 5°07′05″E
- Country: France
- Region: Bourgogne-Franche-Comté
- Department: Côte-d'Or
- Arrondissement: Beaune
- Canton: Brazey-en-Plaine
- Intercommunality: Rives de Saône

Government
  - Mayor (2020–2026): Sébastien Delacour
- Area^{1}: 5.15 km^{2} (1.99 sq mi)
- Elevation: 180 m (590 ft)
- Highest elevation: 205 m (673 ft)
- Lowest elevation: 176 m (577 ft)
- Population (2023): 619
  - Density: 120/km^{2} (311/sq mi)
- Time zone: UTC+01:00 (CET)
  - Summer (DST): UTC+02:00 (CEST)
- INSEE/Postal code: 21502 /21250
- ^{1} French Land Register data, which excludes lakes, ponds, glaciers > 1 km^{2} (0.386 sq mi or 247 acres) and river estuaries.

Pouilly-sur-Saône (French pronunciation: [puji syʁ son], literally Pouilly on Saône) is a commune in the Côte-d'Or department in eastern France.

== Geography and Administration ==
Pouilly-sur-Saône is a commune located in the Côte-d'Or department of the Bourgogne-Franche-Comté region in eastern France. It lies on the left bank of the Saône River at an altitude ranging between 176 and 205 meters, covering an area of 5.15 square kilometers. As of the latest available data, the commune has a population of 614, resulting in a population density of approximately 119 inhabitants per square kilometer. It is situated about 49 kilometers from Dijon, the prefecture of the department. Administratively, Pouilly-sur-Saône is part of the intercommunal structure CC Rives de Saône and is identified by the INSEE code 21502. Notable natural sites nearby include the Forest of Glaine.

== Population ==
Historical population
Year	Pop.	±% p.a.
1968	719	—
1975	583	−2.95%
1982	518	−1.67%
1990	539	+0.50%
1999	591	+1.03%
2007	661	+1.41%
2012	667	+0.18%
2017	615	−1.61%
2023	619	+0.11%
Source: INSEE

== See also ==
- Communes of the Côte-d'Or department
