= Laperrière-sur-Saône =

- Commune
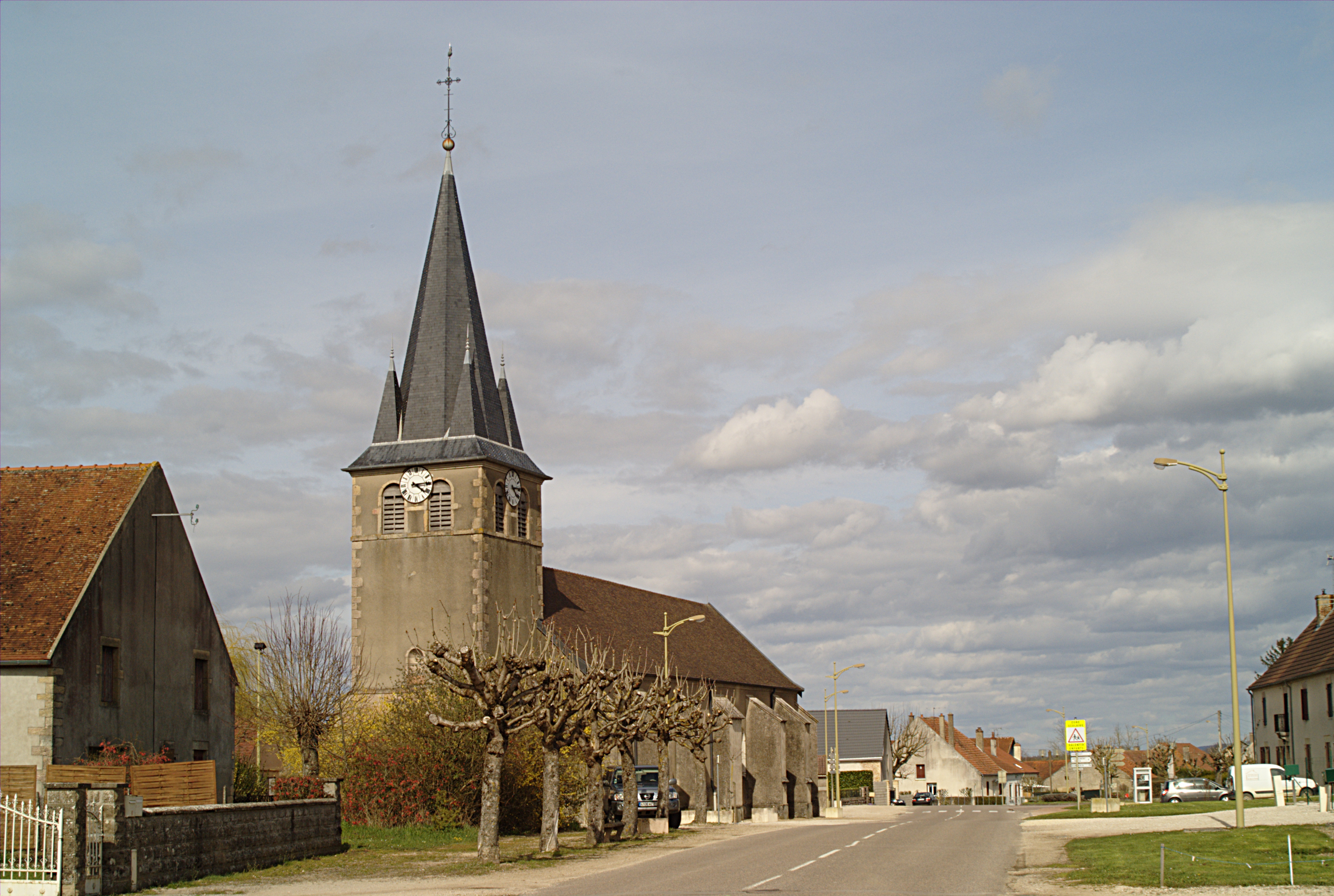
- The church in Laperrière-sur-Saône

- Coat of arms
- Location of Laperrière-sur-Saône
- Location within France Location within Bourgogne-Franche-Comté
- Coordinates: 47°06′45″N 5°20′32″E
- Country: France
- Region: Bourgogne-Franche-Comté
- Department: Côte-d'Or
- Arrondissement: Beaune
- Canton: Brazey-en-Plaine
- Intercommunality: Rives de Saône

Government
  - Mayor (2020–2026): Jean-Luc Soller
- Area^{1}: 11.17 km^{2} (4.31 sq mi)
- Elevation: 210 m (690 ft)
- Highest elevation: 201 m (659 ft)
- Lowest elevation: 180 m (590 ft)
- Population (2023): 432
  - Density: 38.7/km^{2} (100/sq mi)
- Time zone: UTC+01:00 (CET)
  - Summer (DST): UTC+02:00 (CEST)
- INSEE/Postal code: 21342 /21170
- ^{1} French Land Register data, which excludes lakes, ponds, glaciers > 1 km^{2} (0.386 sq mi or 247 acres) and river estuaries.

Laperrière-sur-Saône (French pronunciation: [lapɛʁjɛʁ syʁ son], literally Laperrière on Saône) is a commune in the Côte-d'Or department in eastern France.

== Population ==
Historical population
Year	Pop.	±% p.a.
1968	267	—
1975	239	−1.57%
1982	273	+1.92%
1990	325	+2.20%
1999	301	−0.85%
2007	399	+3.59%
2012	419	+0.98%
2017	436	+0.80%
2023	432	−0.15%
Source: INSEE

== See also ==
- Communes of the Côte-d'Or department
