= Franxault =

- Commune
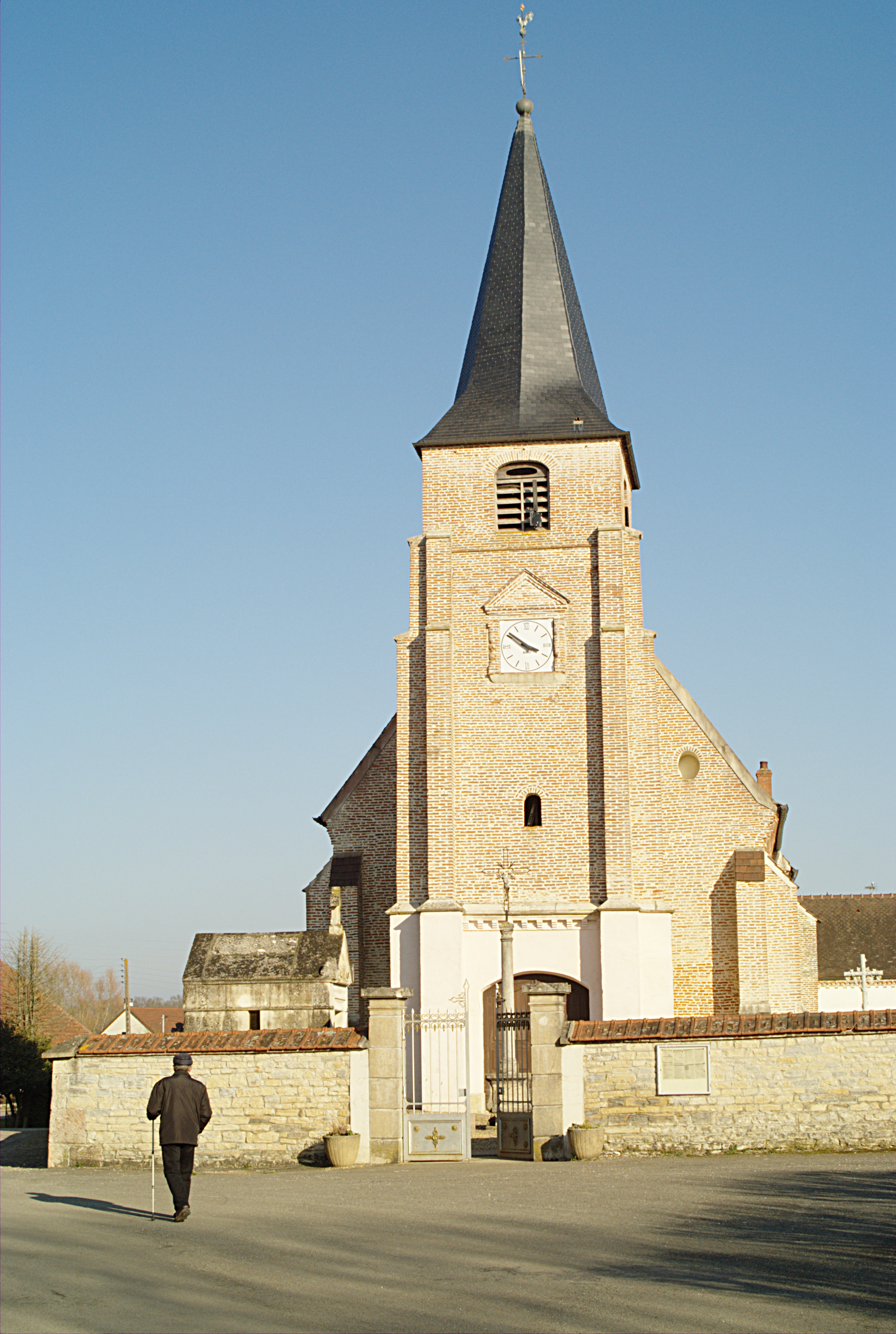
- The church in Franxault

- Coat of arms
- Location of Franxault
- Location within France Location within Bourgogne-Franche-Comté
- Coordinates: 47°03′15″N 5°16′41″E
- Country: France
- Region: Bourgogne-Franche-Comté
- Department: Côte-d'Or
- Arrondissement: Beaune
- Canton: Brazey-en-Plaine
- Intercommunality: Rives de Saône

Government
  - Mayor (2020–2026): Camille Simar
- Area^{1}: 12.32 km^{2} (4.76 sq mi)
- Elevation: 184 m (604 ft)
- Highest elevation: 194 m (636 ft)
- Lowest elevation: 178 m (584 ft)
- Population (2023): 504
  - Density: 40.9/km^{2} (106/sq mi)
- Time zone: UTC+01:00 (CET)
  - Summer (DST): UTC+02:00 (CEST)
- INSEE/Postal code: 21285 /21170
- ^{1} French Land Register data, which excludes lakes, ponds, glaciers > 1 km^{2} (0.386 sq mi or 247 acres) and river estuaries.

Franxault (French pronunciation: [fʁɑ̃kso]) is a commune in the Côte-d'Or department in eastern France.

== Population ==
Historical population
| Year | Pop. | ±% p.a. |
|---|---|---|
| 1968 | 317 | — |
| 1975 | 296 | −0.97% |
| 1982 | 359 | +2.79% |
| 1990 | 385 | +0.88% |
| 1999 | 389 | +0.11% |
| 2007 | 402 | +0.41% |
| 2012 | 436 | +1.64% |
| 2017 | 476 | +1.77% |
| 2023 | 504 | +0.96% |
Source: INSEE

== See also ==
- Communes of the Côte-d'Or department
