= Samerey =

- Commune
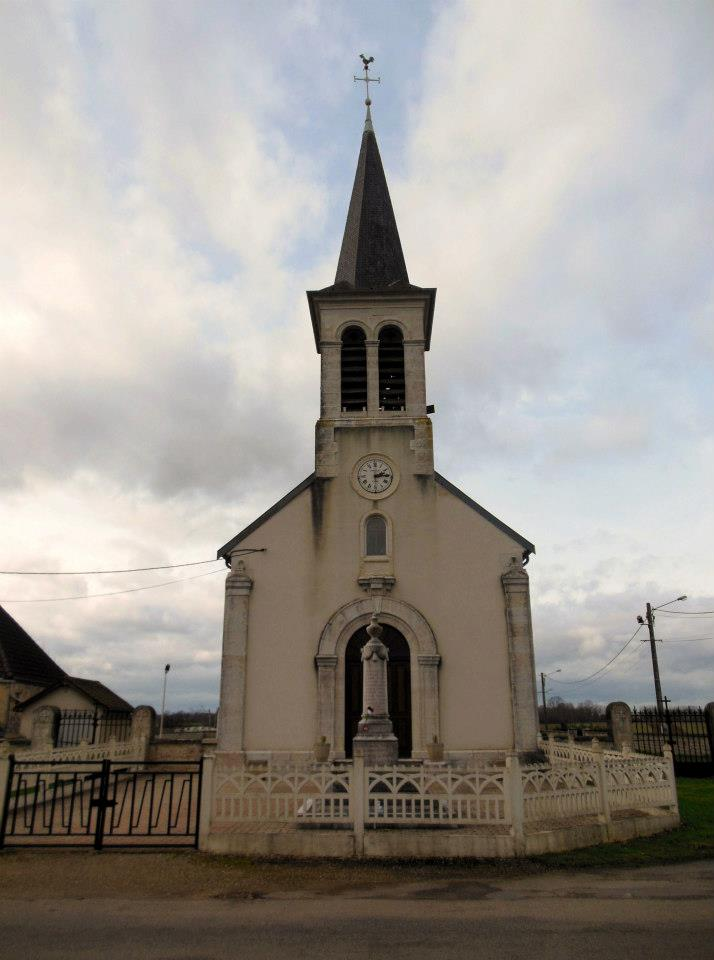
- The church in Samerey
- Location of Samerey
- Location within France Location within Bourgogne-Franche-Comté
- Coordinates: 47°05′27″N 5°21′41″E
- Country: France
- Region: Bourgogne-Franche-Comté
- Department: Côte-d'Or
- Arrondissement: Beaune
- Canton: Brazey-en-Plaine
- Intercommunality: Rives de Saône

Government
  - Mayor (2020–2026): Anthony Goulut
- Area^{1}: 7.02 km^{2} (2.71 sq mi)
- Elevation: 200 m (660 ft)
- Highest elevation: 204 m (669 ft)
- Lowest elevation: 184 m (604 ft)
- Population (2023): 141
  - Density: 20.1/km^{2} (52.0/sq mi)
- Time zone: UTC+01:00 (CET)
  - Summer (DST): UTC+02:00 (CEST)
- INSEE/Postal code: 21581 /21170
- ^{1} French Land Register data, which excludes lakes, ponds, glaciers > 1 km^{2} (0.386 sq mi or 247 acres) and river estuaries.

Samerey (French pronunciation: [samʁɛ]) is a commune in the Côte-d'Or department in eastern France.

== Population ==
Historical population
Year	Pop.	±% p.a.
1968	136	—
1975	140	+0.41%
1982	138	−0.21%
1990	156	+1.54%
1999	141	−1.12%
2007	132	−0.82%
2012	135	+0.45%
2017	155	+2.80%
2023	141	−1.57%
Source: INSEE

== See also ==
- Communes of the Côte-d'Or department
