= Magny-lès-Aubigny =

- Commune
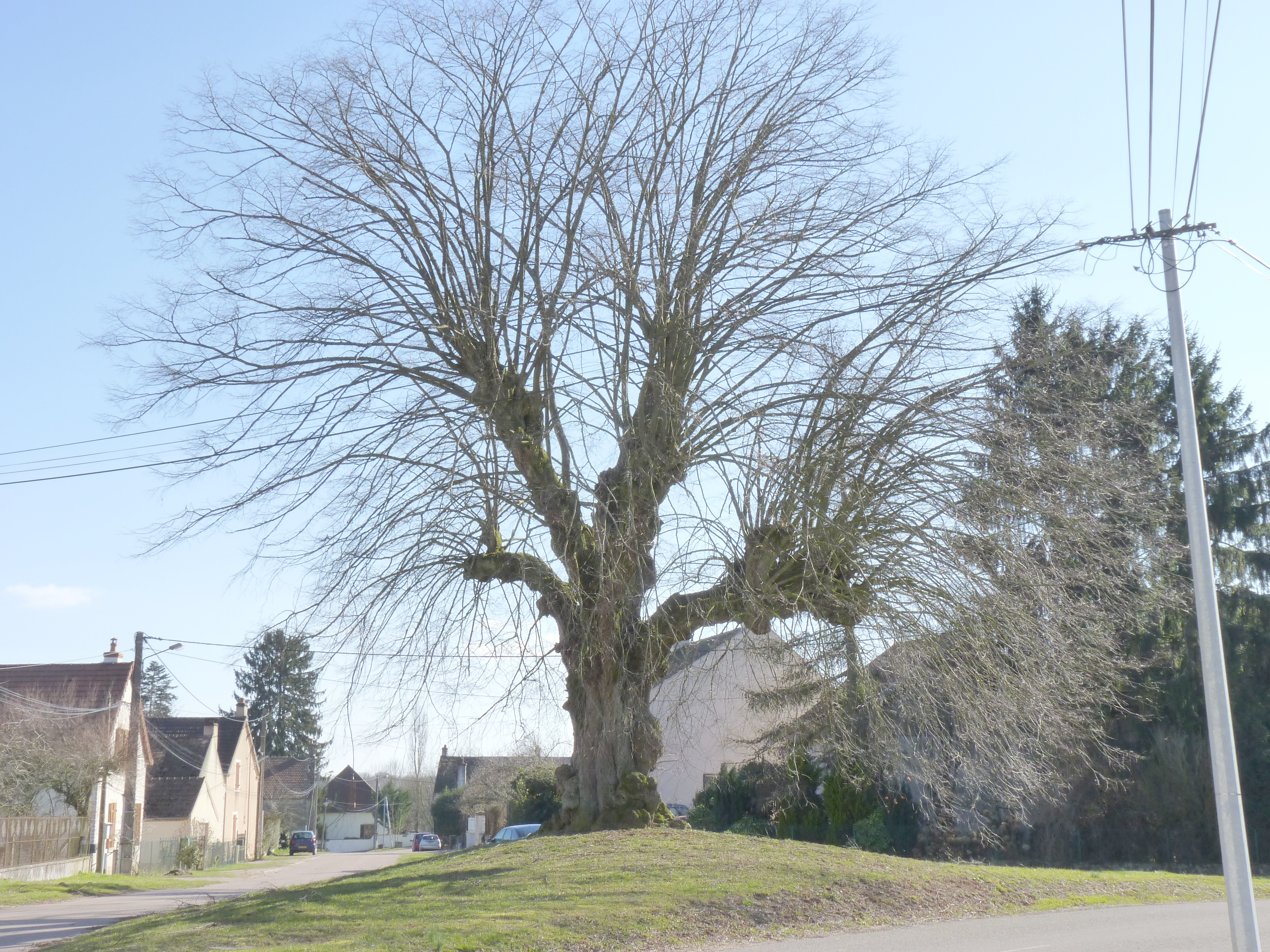
- Linden tree
- Location of Magny-lès-Aubigny
- Location within France Location within Bourgogne-Franche-Comté
- Coordinates: 47°06′43″N 5°10′38″E
- Country: France
- Region: Bourgogne-Franche-Comté
- Department: Côte-d'Or
- Arrondissement: Beaune
- Canton: Brazey-en-Plaine
- Intercommunality: Rives de Saône

Government
  - Mayor (2020–2026): David Hiez
- Area^{1}: 6.99 km^{2} (2.70 sq mi)
- Elevation: 199 m (653 ft)
- Highest elevation: 209 m (686 ft)
- Lowest elevation: 182 m (597 ft)
- Population (2023): 219
  - Density: 31.3/km^{2} (81.1/sq mi)
- Time zone: UTC+01:00 (CET)
  - Summer (DST): UTC+02:00 (CEST)
- INSEE/Postal code: 21366 /21170
- ^{1} French Land Register data, which excludes lakes, ponds, glaciers > 1 km^{2} (0.386 sq mi or 247 acres) and river estuaries.

Magny-lès-Aubigny (French pronunciation: [maɲi lɛ.z‿obiɲi], literally Magny near Aubigny) is a commune in the Côte-d'Or department in eastern France.

== Population ==
Historical population
Year	Pop.	±% p.a.
1968	163	—
1975	150	−1.18%
1982	159	+0.84%
1990	182	+1.70%
1999	195	+0.77%
2007	201	+0.38%
2012	209	+0.78%
2017	207	−0.19%
2023	219	+0.94%
Source: INSEE

== See also ==
- Communes of the Côte-d'Or department
