= Losne =

- Commune
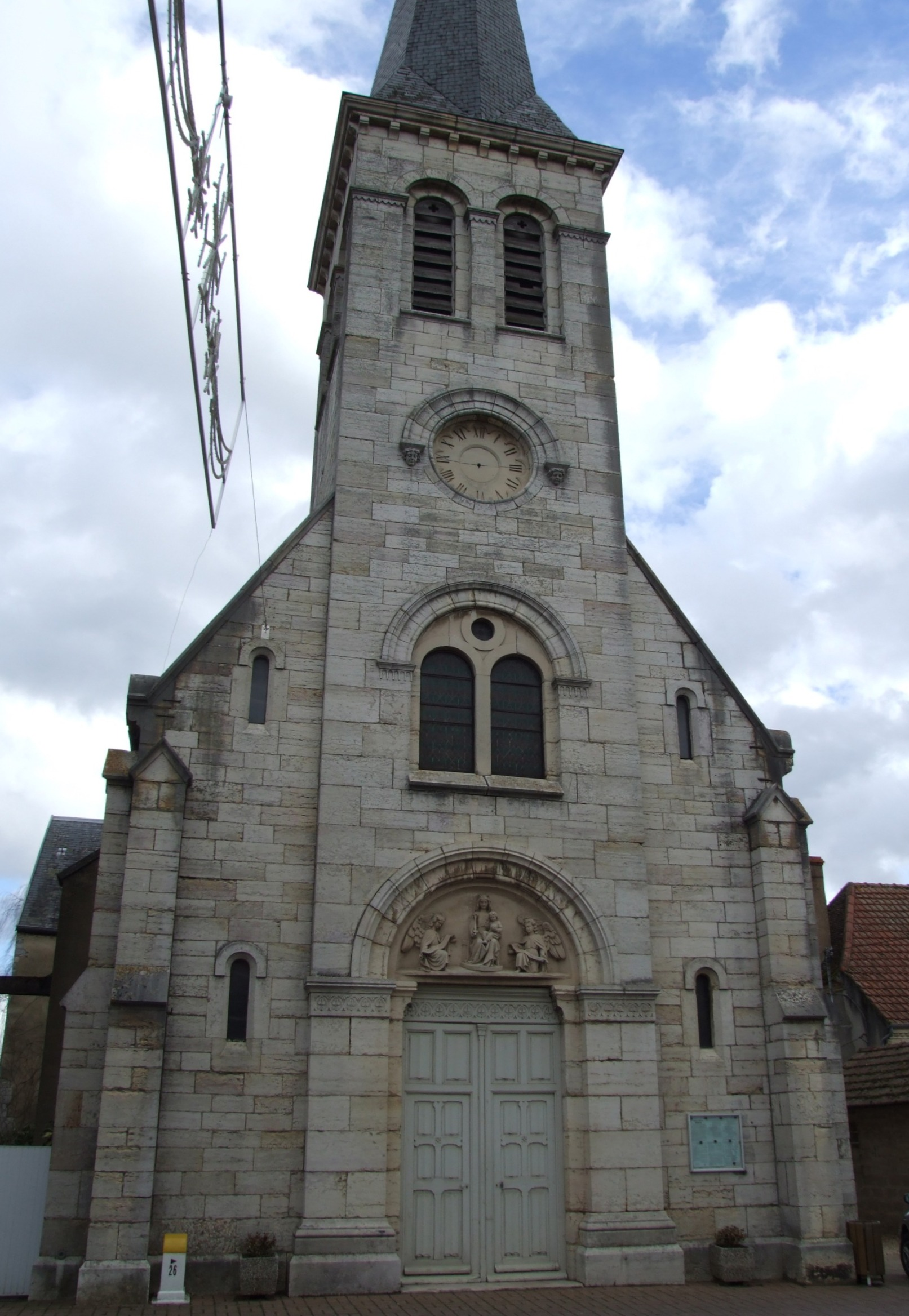
- The church in Losne
- Location of Losne
- Location within France Location within Bourgogne-Franche-Comté
- Coordinates: 47°05′57″N 5°15′50″E
- Country: France
- Region: Bourgogne-Franche-Comté
- Department: Côte-d'Or
- Arrondissement: Beaune
- Canton: Brazey-en-Plaine
- Intercommunality: Rives de Saône

Government
  - Mayor (2020–2026): Laurence Brébant
- Area^{1}: 22.61 km^{2} (8.73 sq mi)
- Elevation: 183 m (600 ft)
- Highest elevation: 189 m (620 ft)
- Lowest elevation: 178 m (584 ft)
- Population (2023): 1,720
  - Density: 76.1/km^{2} (197/sq mi)
- Time zone: UTC+01:00 (CET)
  - Summer (DST): UTC+02:00 (CEST)
- INSEE/Postal code: 21356 /21170
- ^{1} French Land Register data, which excludes lakes, ponds, glaciers > 1 km^{2} (0.386 sq mi or 247 acres) and river estuaries.

Losne (French pronunciation: [lon]) is a commune in the Côte-d'Or department in eastern France.

== Population ==
Historical population
Year	Pop.	±% p.a.
1968	1,108	—
1975	1,172	+0.81%
1982	1,307	+1.57%
1990	1,334	+0.26%
1999	1,347	+0.11%
2007	1,492	+1.29%
2012	1,676	+2.35%
2017	1,606	−0.85%
2023	1,720	+1.15%
Source: INSEE

== See also ==
- Communes of the Côte-d'Or department
