= Tichey =

- Commune
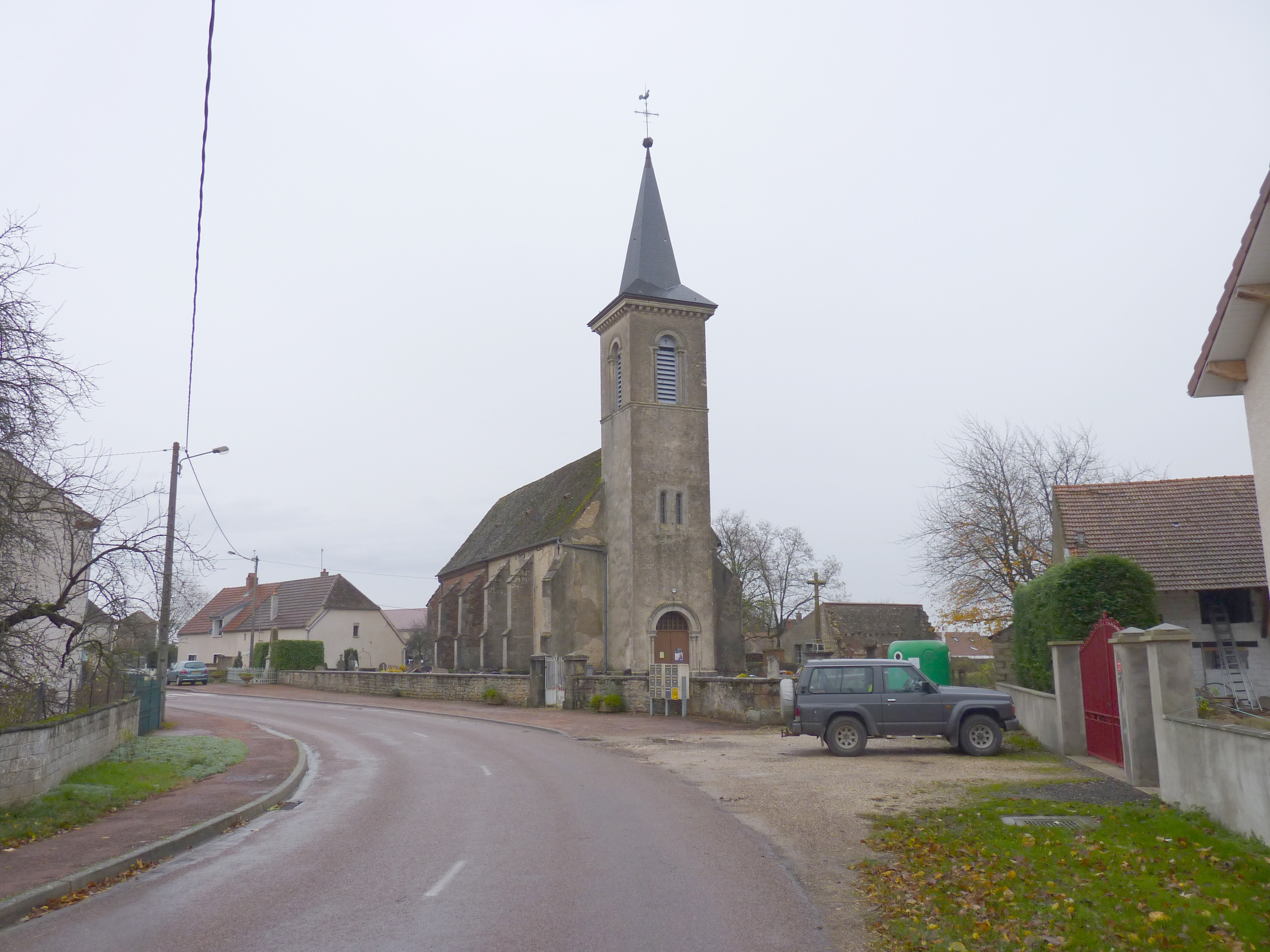
- The church in Tichey
- Location of Tichey
- Location within France Location within Bourgogne-Franche-Comté
- Coordinates: 47°00′49″N 5°17′05″E
- Country: France
- Region: Bourgogne-Franche-Comté
- Department: Côte-d'Or
- Arrondissement: Beaune
- Canton: Brazey-en-Plaine
- Intercommunality: Rives de Saône

Government
  - Mayor (2020–2026): François Variot
- Area^{1}: 6.88 km^{2} (2.66 sq mi)
- Elevation: 184 m (604 ft)
- Highest elevation: 187 m (614 ft)
- Lowest elevation: 181 m (594 ft)
- Population (2023): 208
  - Density: 30.2/km^{2} (78.3/sq mi)
- Time zone: UTC+01:00 (CET)
  - Summer (DST): UTC+02:00 (CEST)
- INSEE/Postal code: 21637 /21250
- ^{1} French Land Register data, which excludes lakes, ponds, glaciers > 1 km^{2} (0.386 sq mi or 247 acres) and river estuaries.

Tichey (French pronunciation: [tiʃɛ]) is a commune in the Côte-d'Or department in eastern France.

== Population ==
Historical population
Year	Pop.	±% p.a.
1968	191	—
1975	185	−0.45%
1982	195	+0.75%
1990	187	−0.52%
1999	172	−0.92%
2007	193	+1.45%
2012	221	+2.75%
2017	212	−0.83%
2023	208	−0.32%
Source: INSEE

== See also ==
- Communes of the Côte-d'Or department
