= Saint-Usage, Côte-d'Or =

Saint-Usage
- Commune
- Coat of arms
- Location of Saint-Usage
- Location within France Location within Bourgogne-Franche-Comté
- Coordinates: 47°06′36″N 5°15′45″E
- Country: France
- Region: Bourgogne-Franche-Comté
- Department: Côte-d'Or
- Arrondissement: Beaune
- Canton: Brazey-en-Plaine
- Intercommunality: Rives de Saône

Government
  - Mayor (2020–2026): Valérie Hostalier
- Area^{1}: 9.36 km^{2} (3.61 sq mi)
- Elevation: 185 m (607 ft)
- Highest elevation: 186 m (610 ft)
- Lowest elevation: 178 m (584 ft)
- Population (2023): 1,353
  - Density: 145/km^{2} (374/sq mi)
- Time zone: UTC+01:00 (CET)
  - Summer (DST): UTC+02:00 (CEST)
- INSEE/Postal code: 21577 /21170
- ^{1} French Land Register data, which excludes lakes, ponds, glaciers > 1 km^{2} (0.386 sq mi or 247 acres) and river estuaries.

Saint-Usage (French pronunciation: [sɛ̃.t‿yzaʒ]) is a commune in the Côte-d'Or department in eastern France.

== Population ==
Historical population
Year	Pop.	±% p.a.
1968	1,020	—
1975	938	−1.19%
1982	1,086	+2.12%
1990	1,007	−0.94%
1999	994	−0.14%
2007	1,104	+1.32%
2012	1,271	+2.86%
2017	1,345	+1.14%
2023	1,353	+0.10%
Source: INSEE

== See also ==
- Communes of the Côte-d'Or department
