= Montmain, Côte-d'Or =

Montmain
- Commune
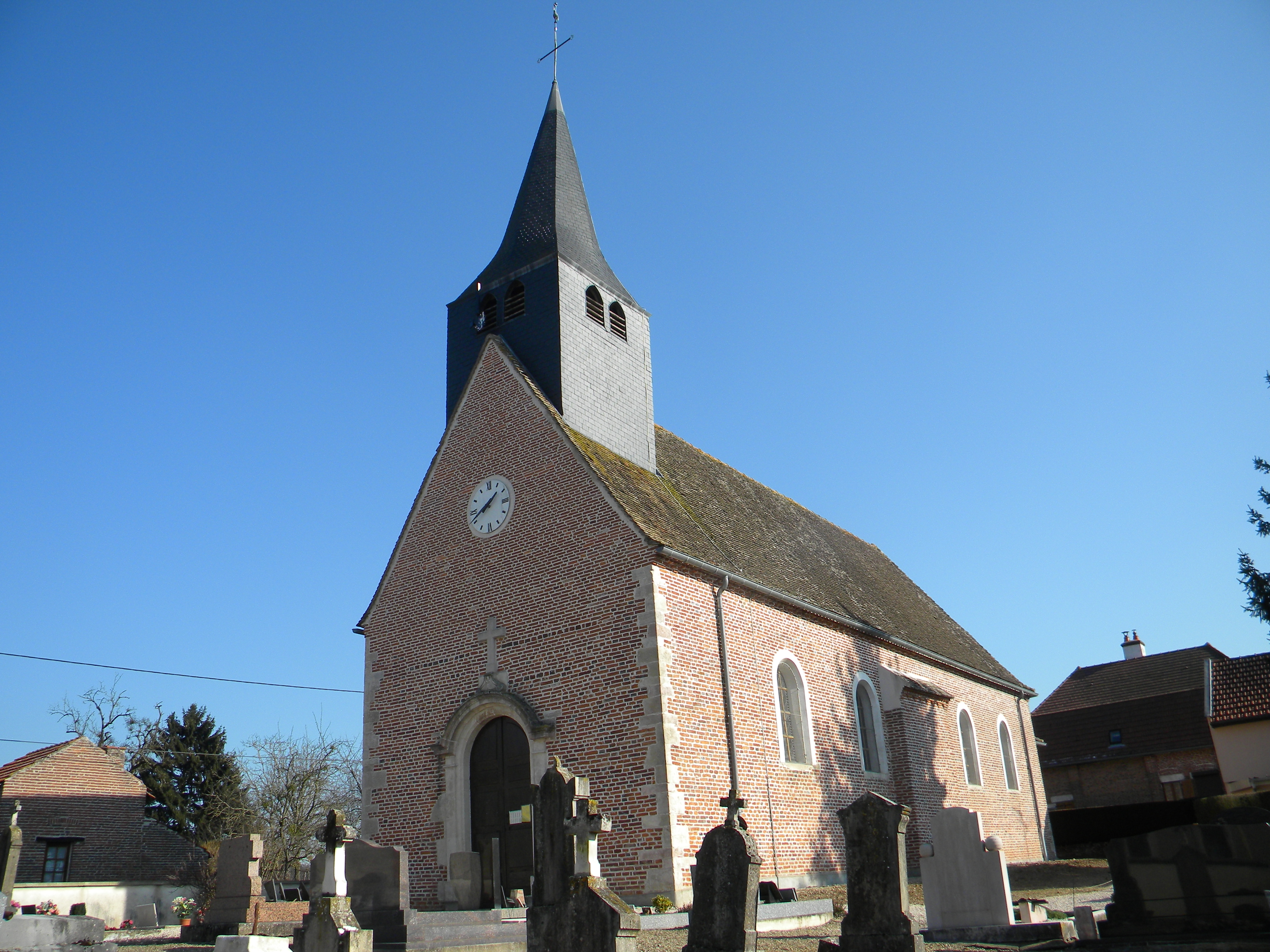
- The church in Montmain
- Location of Montmain
- Location within France Location within Bourgogne-Franche-Comté
- Coordinates: 47°01′47″N 5°03′55″E
- Country: France
- Region: Bourgogne-Franche-Comté
- Department: Côte-d'Or
- Arrondissement: Beaune
- Canton: Brazey-en-Plaine
- Intercommunality: Rives de Saône

Government
  - Mayor (2020–2026): Martine Déchaud
- Area^{1}: 9.07 km^{2} (3.50 sq mi)
- Elevation: 208 m (682 ft)
- Highest elevation: 214 m (702 ft)
- Lowest elevation: 188 m (617 ft)
- Population (2023): 137
  - Density: 15.1/km^{2} (39.1/sq mi)
- Time zone: UTC+01:00 (CET)
  - Summer (DST): UTC+02:00 (CEST)
- INSEE/Postal code: 21436 /21250
- ^{1} French Land Register data, which excludes lakes, ponds, glaciers > 1 km^{2} (0.386 sq mi or 247 acres) and river estuaries.

Montmain (French pronunciation: [mɔ̃mɛ̃]) is a commune in the Côte-d'Or department in eastern France.

== Population ==
Historical population
Year	Pop.	±% p.a.
1968	58	—
1975	61	+0.72%
1982	65	+0.91%
1990	70	+0.93%
1999	63	−1.16%
2007	93	+4.99%
2012	134	+7.58%
2017	152	+2.55%
2023	137	−1.72%
Source: INSEE

== See also ==
- Communes of the Côte-d'Or department
