= Arconcey =

- Commune
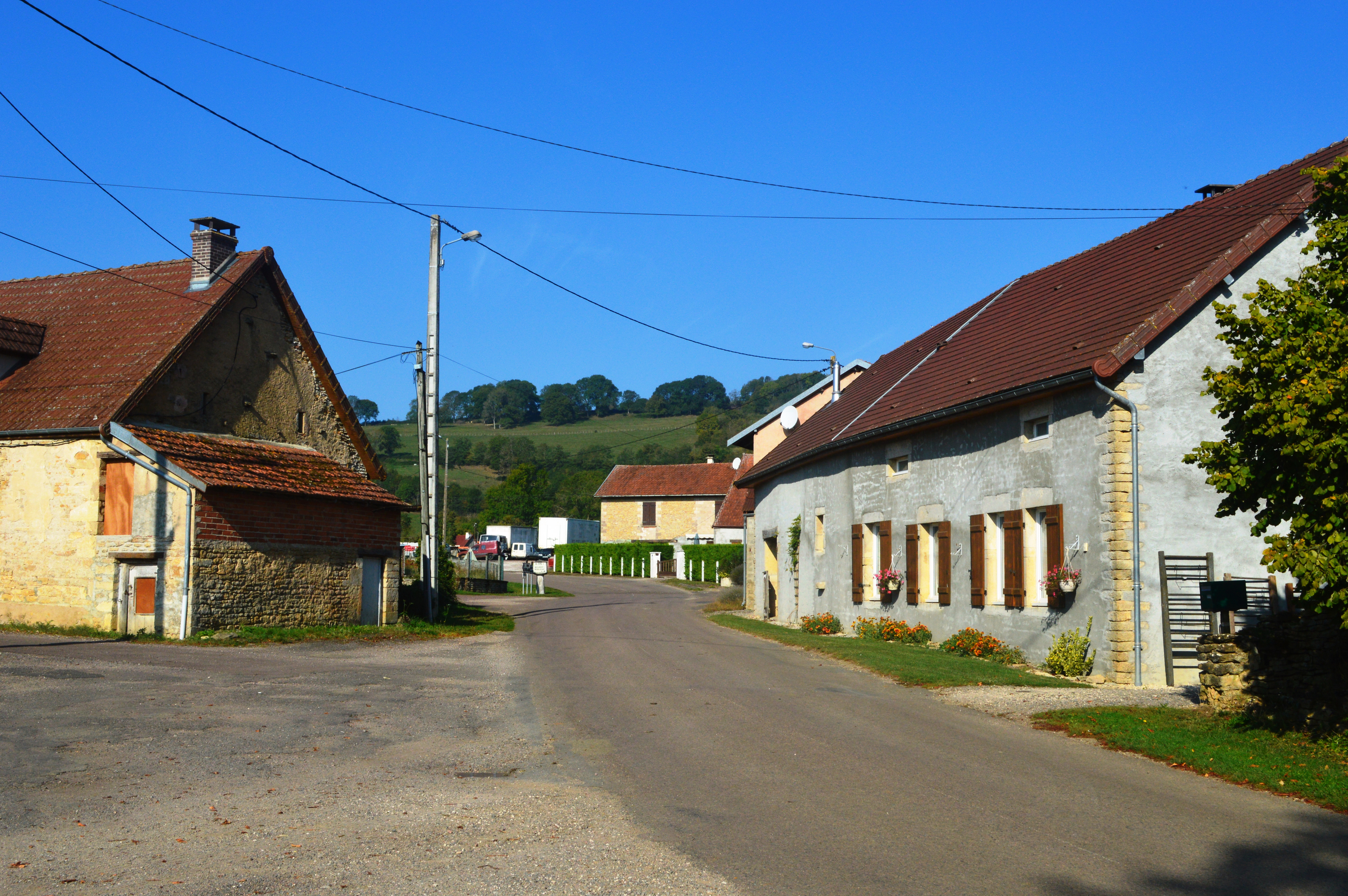
- A street in Arconcey

- Coat of arms
- Location of Arconcey
- Location within France Location within Bourgogne-Franche-Comté
- Coordinates: 47°13′10″N 4°27′21″E
- Country: France
- Region: Bourgogne-Franche-Comté
- Department: Côte-d'Or
- Arrondissement: Beaune
- Canton: Arnay-le-Duc

Government
  - Mayor (2020–2026): Maud Millanvoye
- Area^{1}: 15.06 km^{2} (5.81 sq mi)
- Elevation: 396 m (1,299 ft)
- Highest elevation: 534 m (1,752 ft)
- Lowest elevation: 375 m (1,230 ft)
- Population (2023): 217
  - Density: 14.4/km^{2} (37.3/sq mi)
- Time zone: UTC+01:00 (CET)
  - Summer (DST): UTC+02:00 (CEST)
- INSEE/Postal code: 21020 /21320
- ^{1} French Land Register data, which excludes lakes, ponds, glaciers > 1 km^{2} (0.386 sq mi or 247 acres) and river estuaries.

Arconcey (French pronunciation: [aʁkɔ̃sɛ]) is a commune in the Côte-d'Or department in the Bourgogne-Franche-Comté region of eastern France.

== Geography ==
Arconcey is located some 12 km north of Arnay-le-Duc and some 20 km east by south east of Saulieu. Access to the commune is by the D16 road from Allerey in the south passing through the village and continuing north-east to Thoisy-le-Désert. The D36 also goes from Allerey north through the western part of the commune and continuing to Beurey-Bauguay. The D115A links the village to the D36. Apart from the village there are also the hamlets of Juilly, Laneau, and Avincey. The commune is mostly farmland with a large forest in the south (Bois des Bates) and small forests scattered through the commune.

== Administration ==
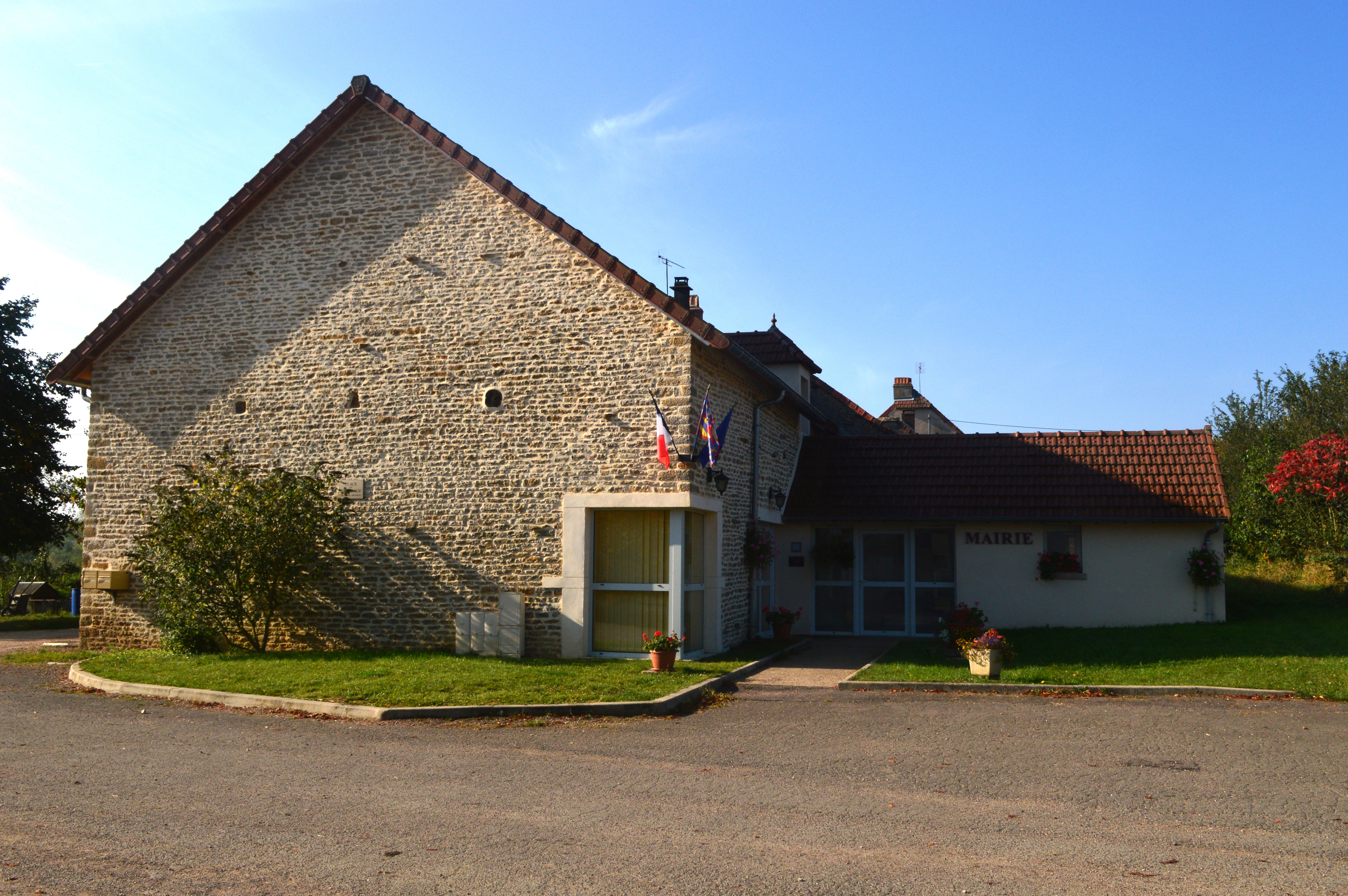
The Town Hall

List of Successive Mayors

From	To	Name
2001	2008	Claudette Saulgeot
2008	2020	Pierre Millanvoye
2020	2026	Maud Millanvoye

== Demography ==
The inhabitants of the commune are known as Arconceyens or Arconceyennes in French.

Historical population

Year	Pop.	±% p.a.
1793	566	—
1821	599	+0.20%
1846	637	+0.25%
1872	509	−0.86%
1901	482	−0.19%
1926	381	−0.94%
1946	327	−0.76%
1962	245	−1.79%
1968	260	+1.00%

Year	Pop.	±% p.a.
1975	229	−1.80%
1982	207	−1.43%
1990	193	−0.87%
1999	188	−0.29%
2007	187	−0.07%
2012	216	+2.93%
2017	222	+0.55%
2023	217	−0.38%

Source: EHESS and INSEE

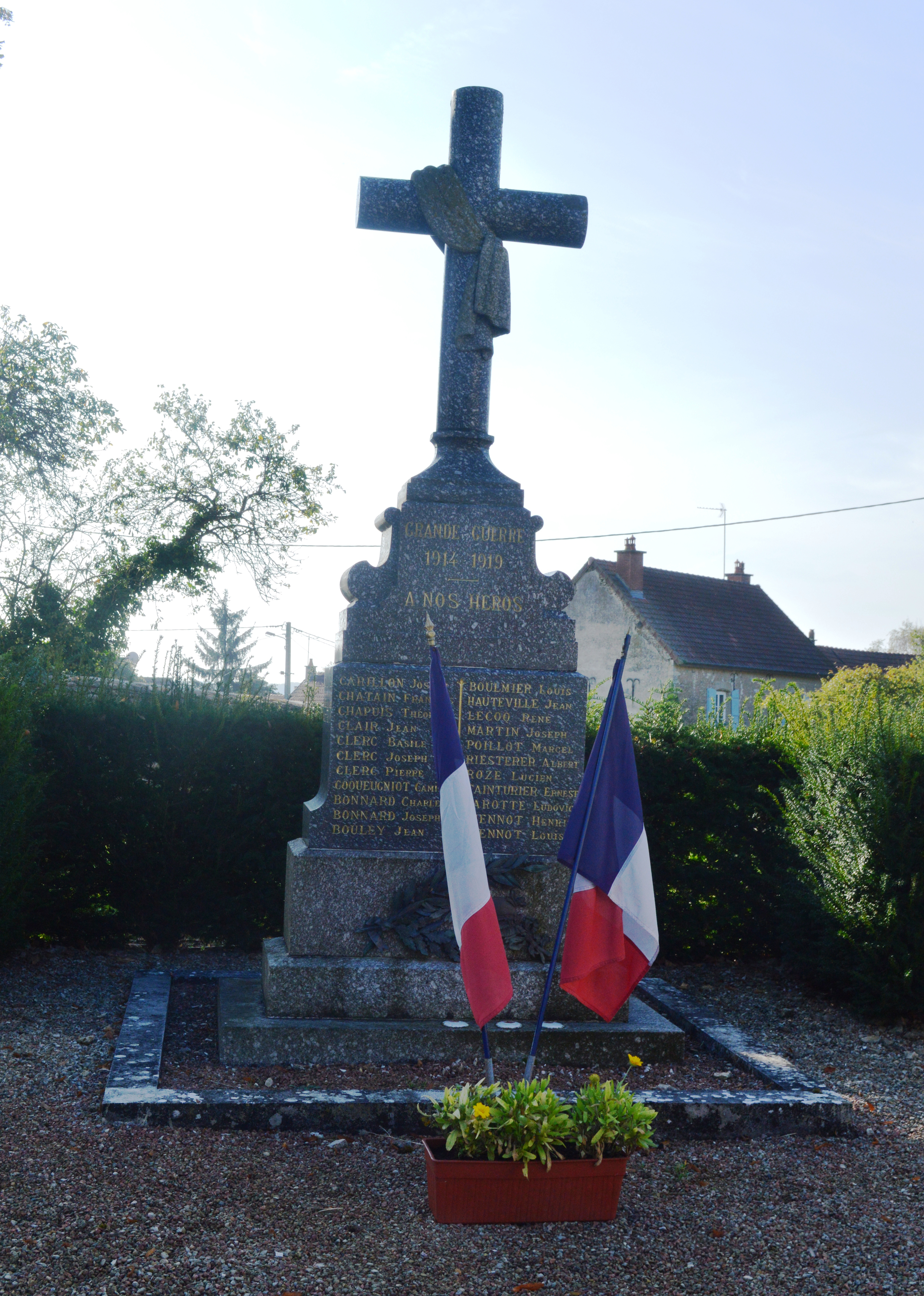
Arconcey War Memorial

== Culture and heritage ==
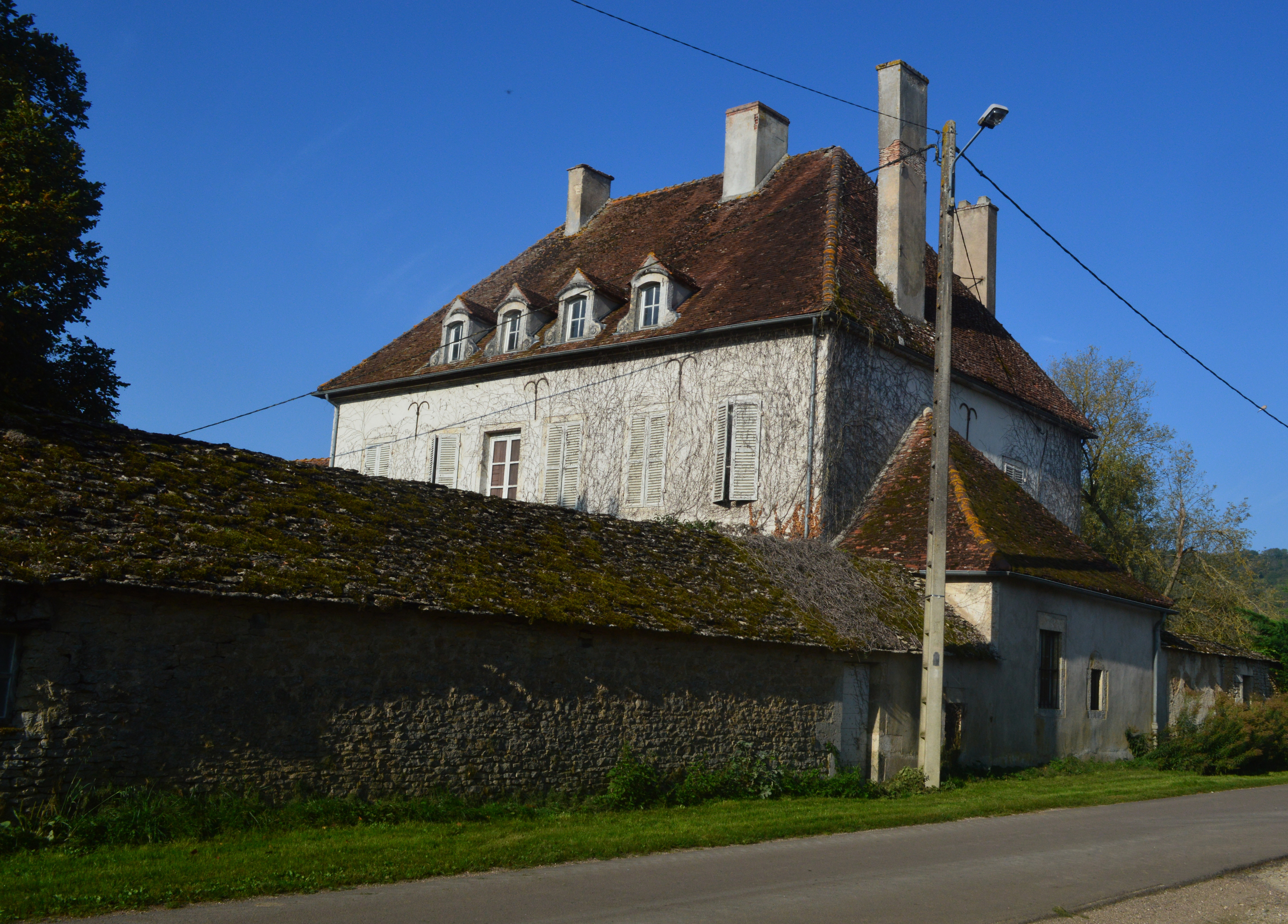
The Chateau and farm

=== Civil heritage ===
The commune has a number of buildings and structures that are registered as historical monuments:

- A Bridge (1857)
- A Chateau and Farm (19th century)
- A School (19th century)

=== Religious heritage ===
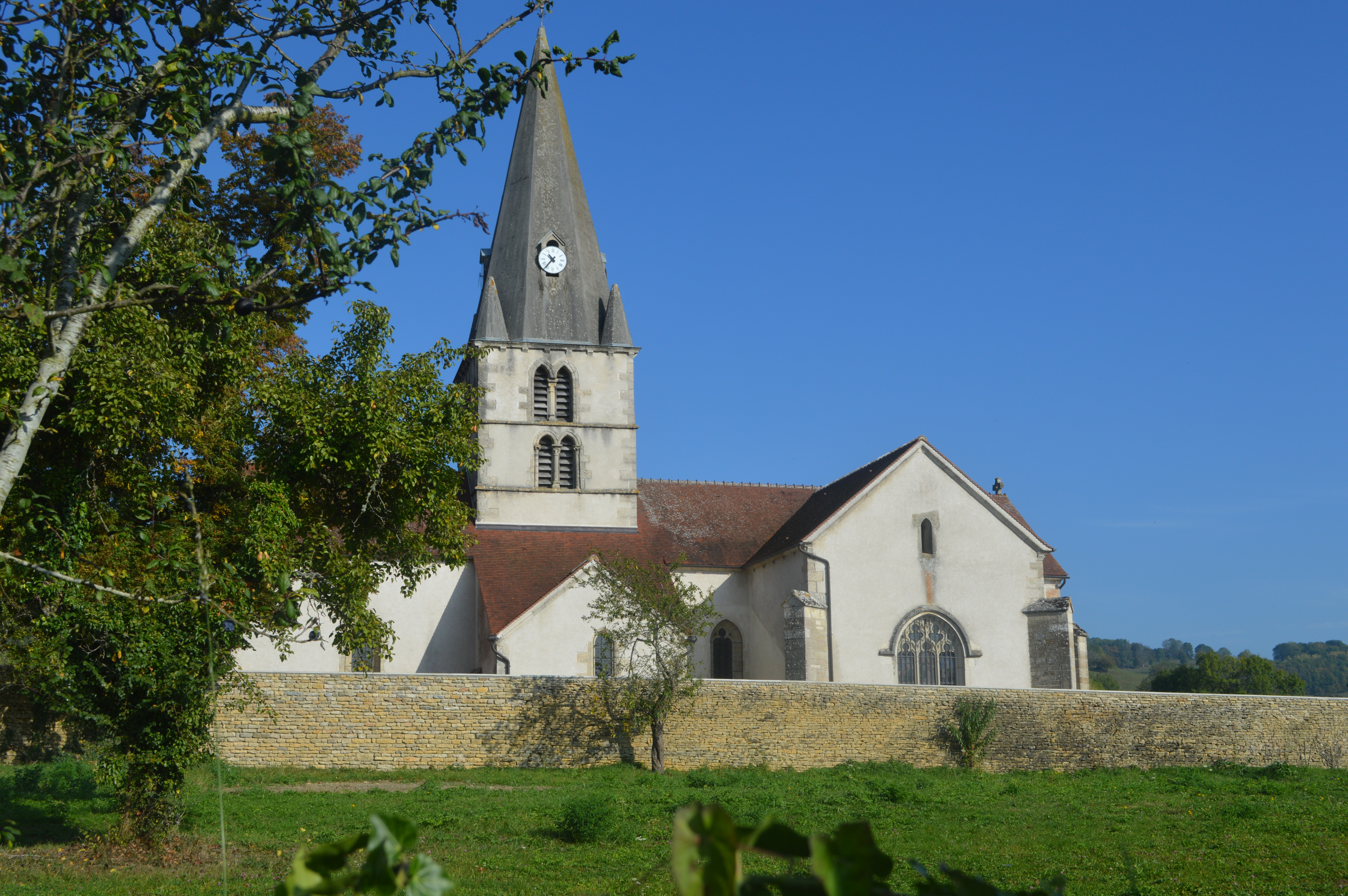
The Church of the Assumption

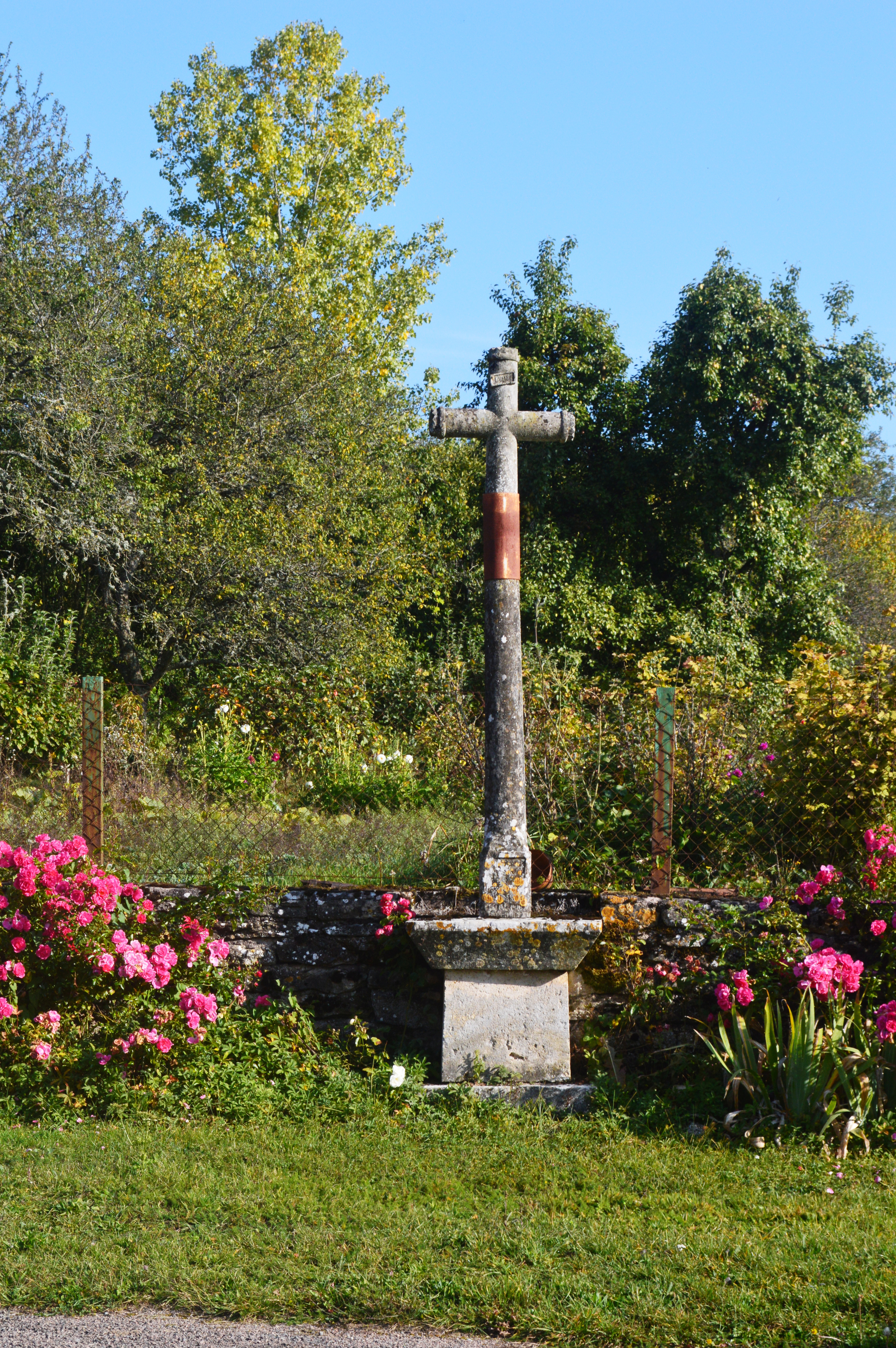
Wayside Cross at Rue du Lavoir

The commune has several religious buildings and structures that are registered as historical monuments:

- The Parish Church of the Assumption (11th century). The Church contains a very large number of items that are registered as historical objects.
- A Wayside Cross at Rue du Lavoir (19th century)
- A Church (12th century)
- A Wayside Cross at Lanneau (1845)
- A Wayside Cross at Juilly (1789)
- A Wayside Cross at Avincey (1865)
- A Wayside Cross (19th century)
- A Wayside Cross (19th century)

=== Gallery of Historical Objects in the Church ===
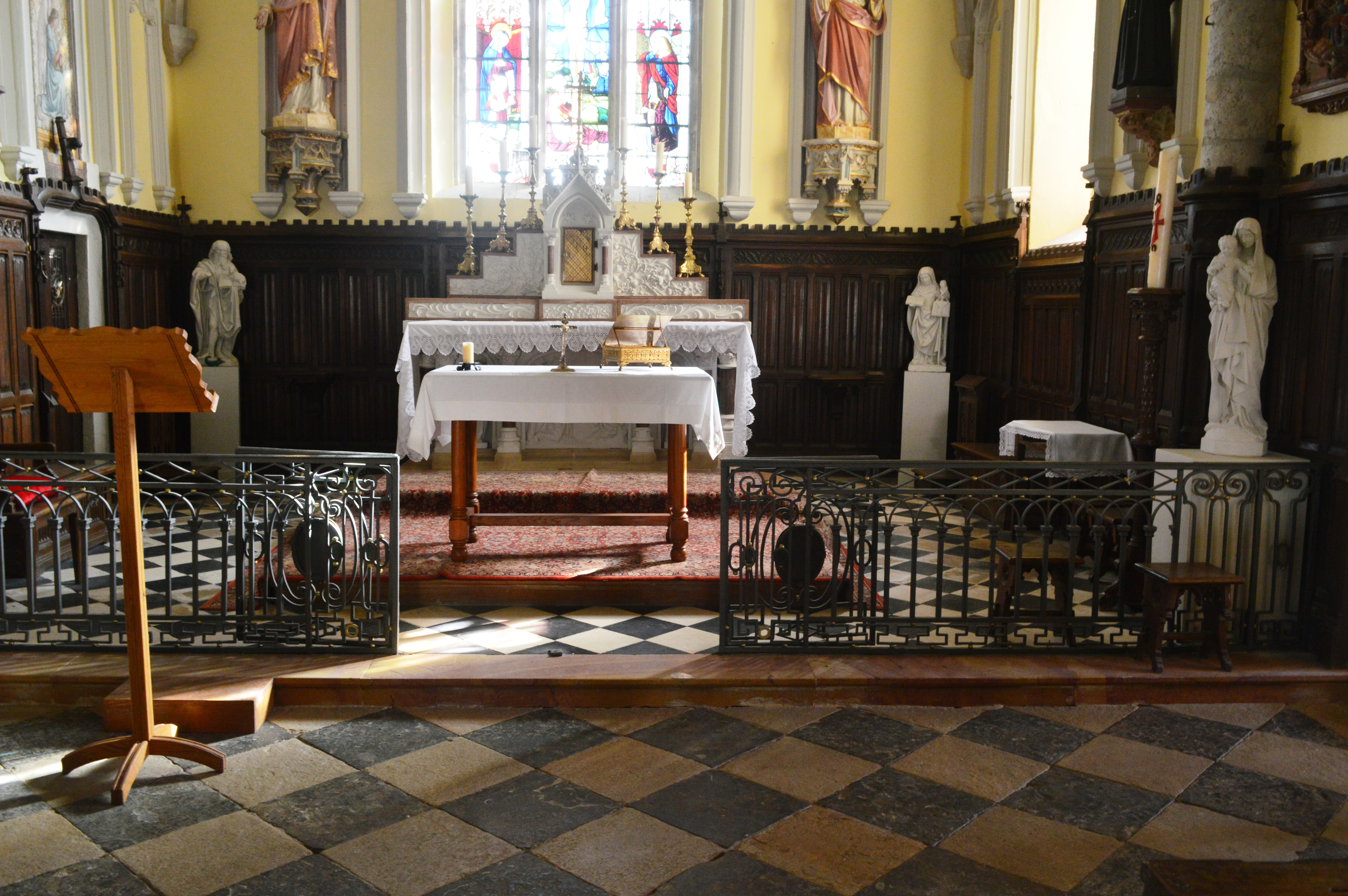
The Main Altar

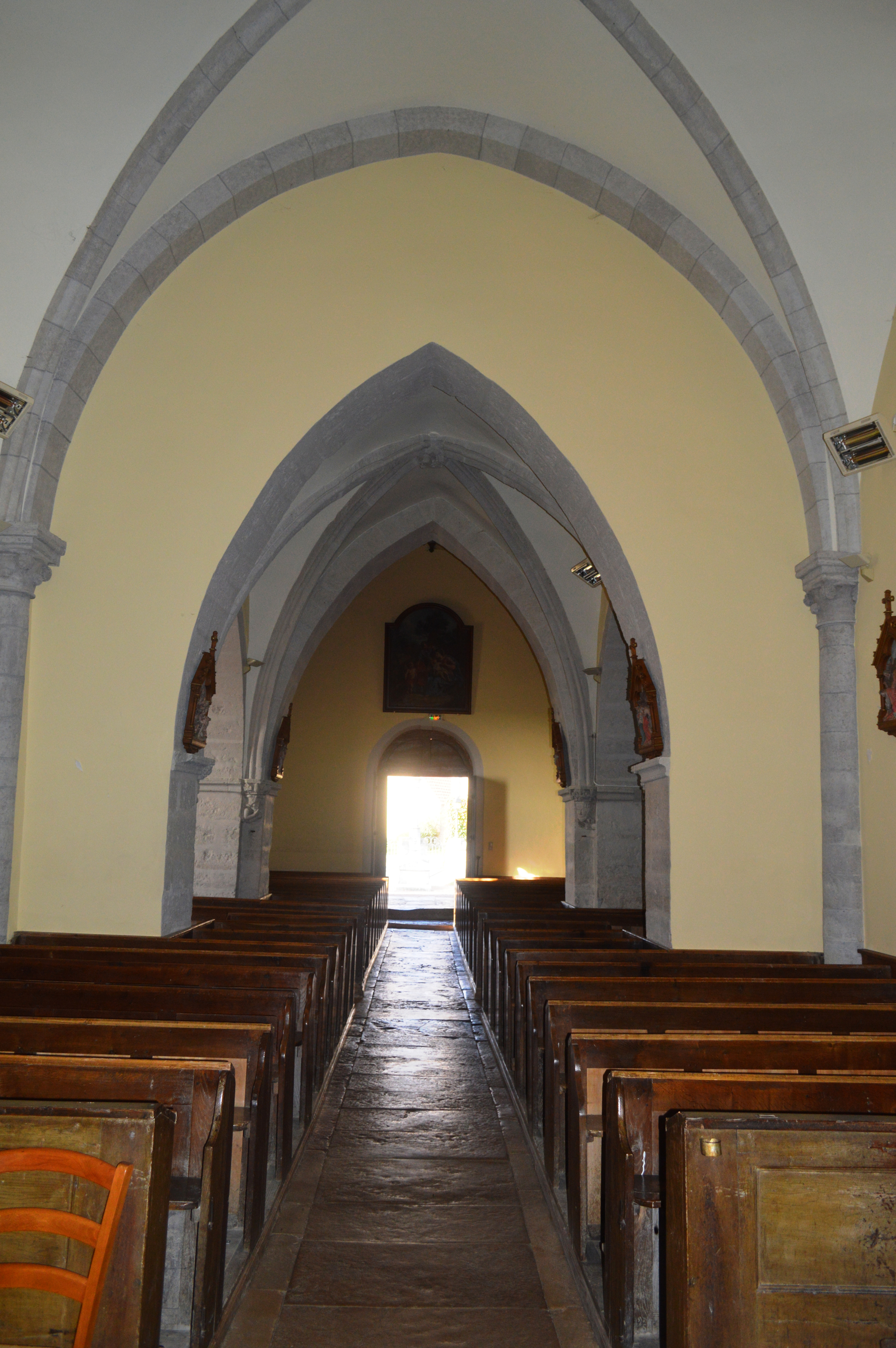
The Nave

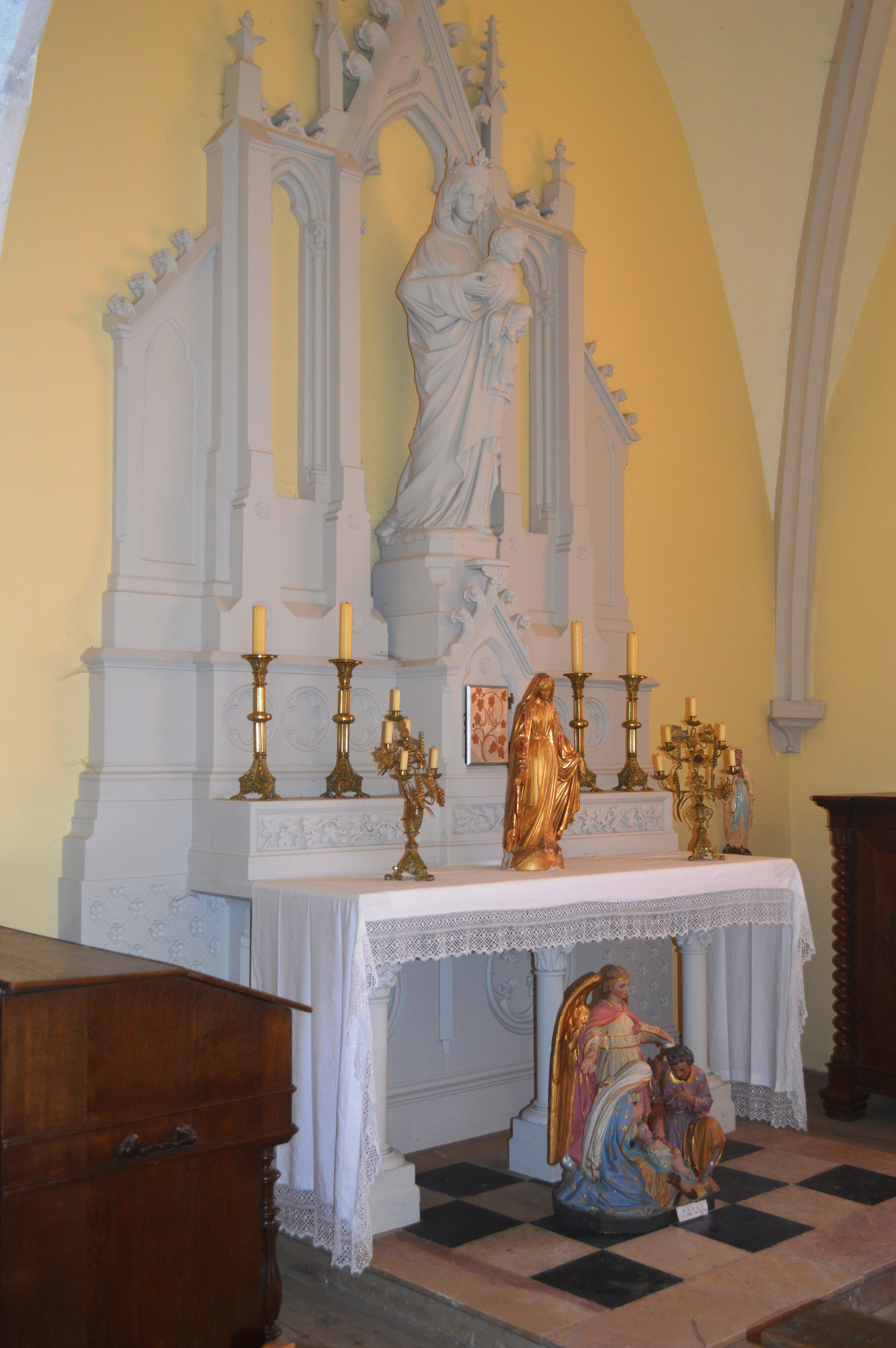
A Secondary Altar

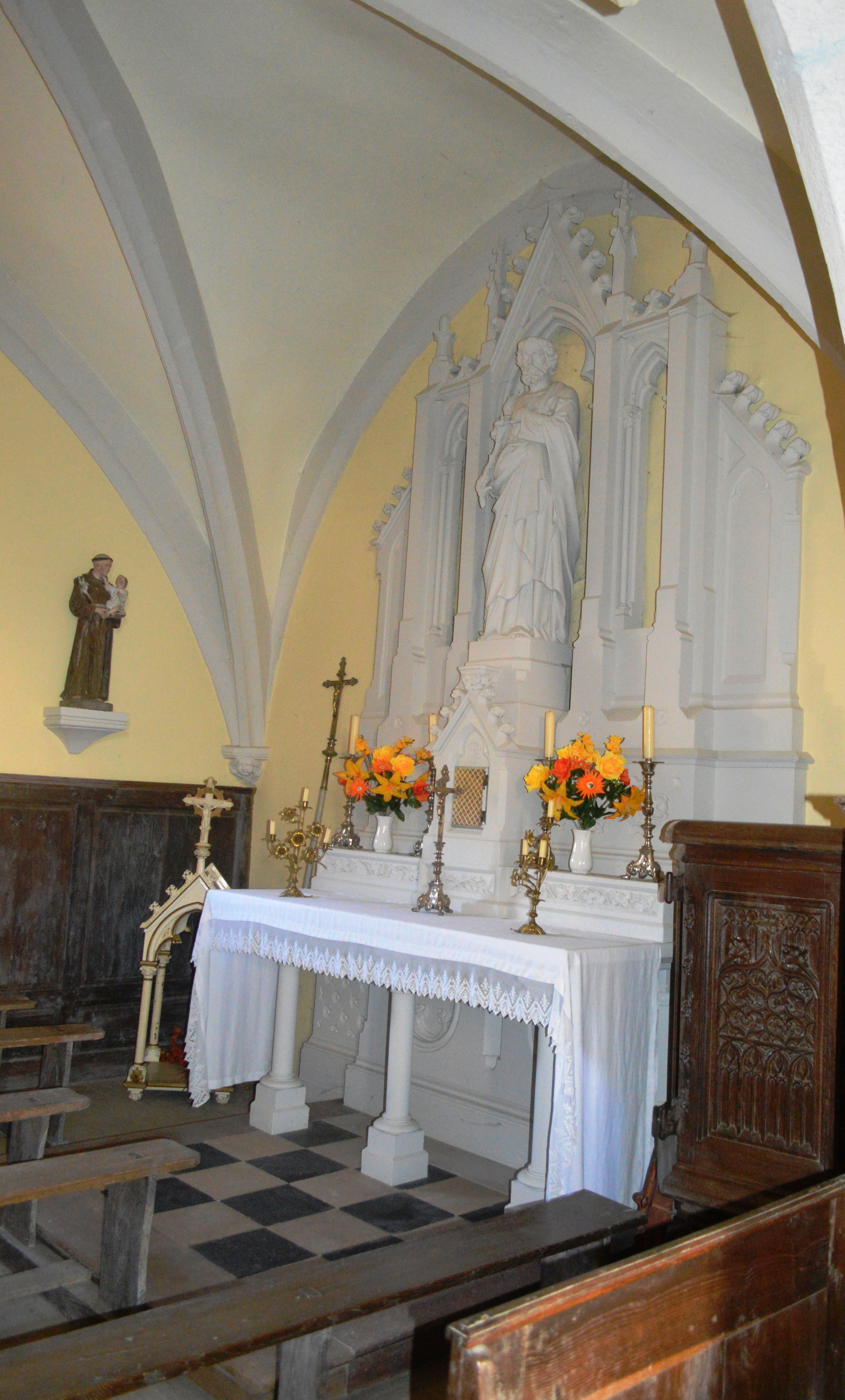
A Secondary Altar

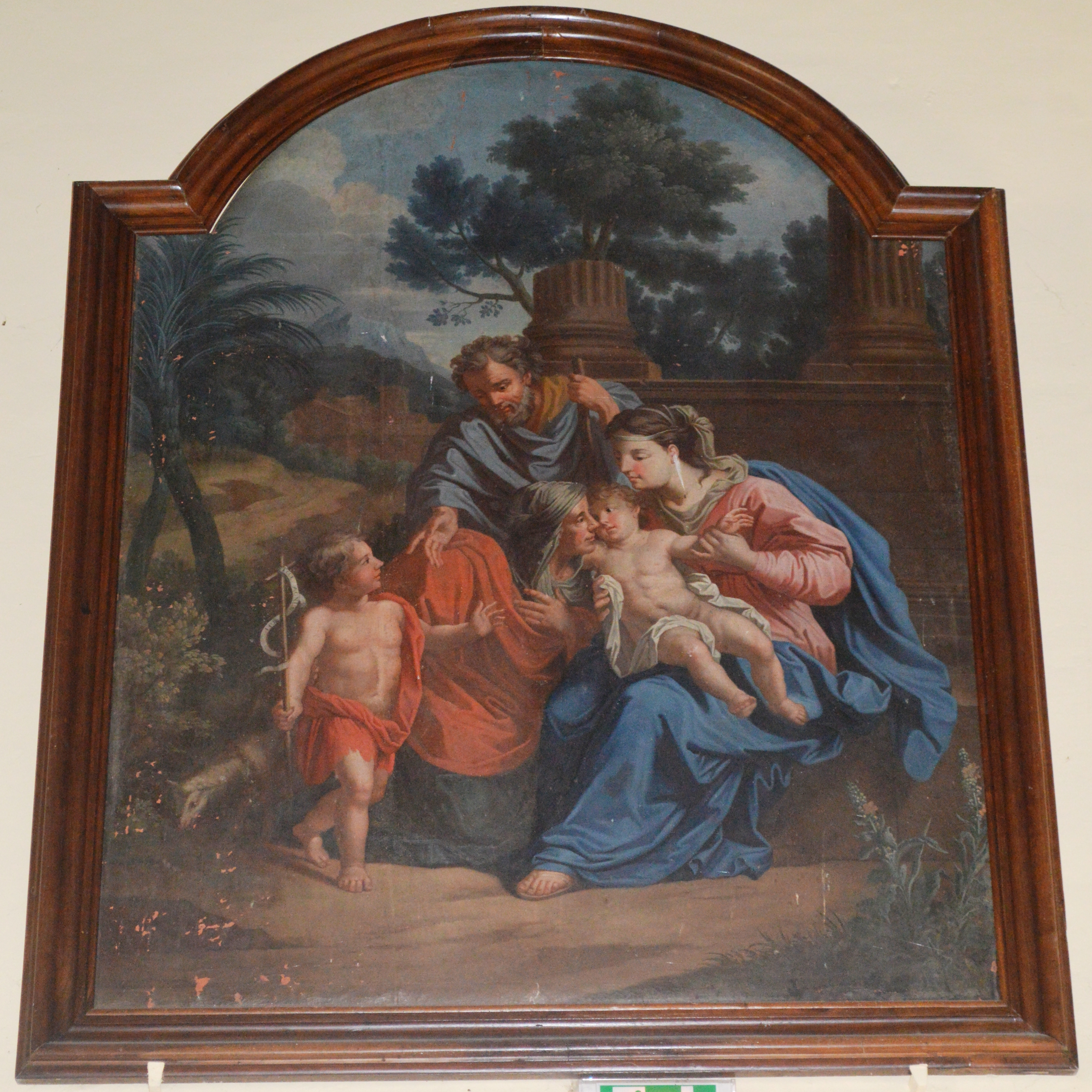
Painting: The Holy Family

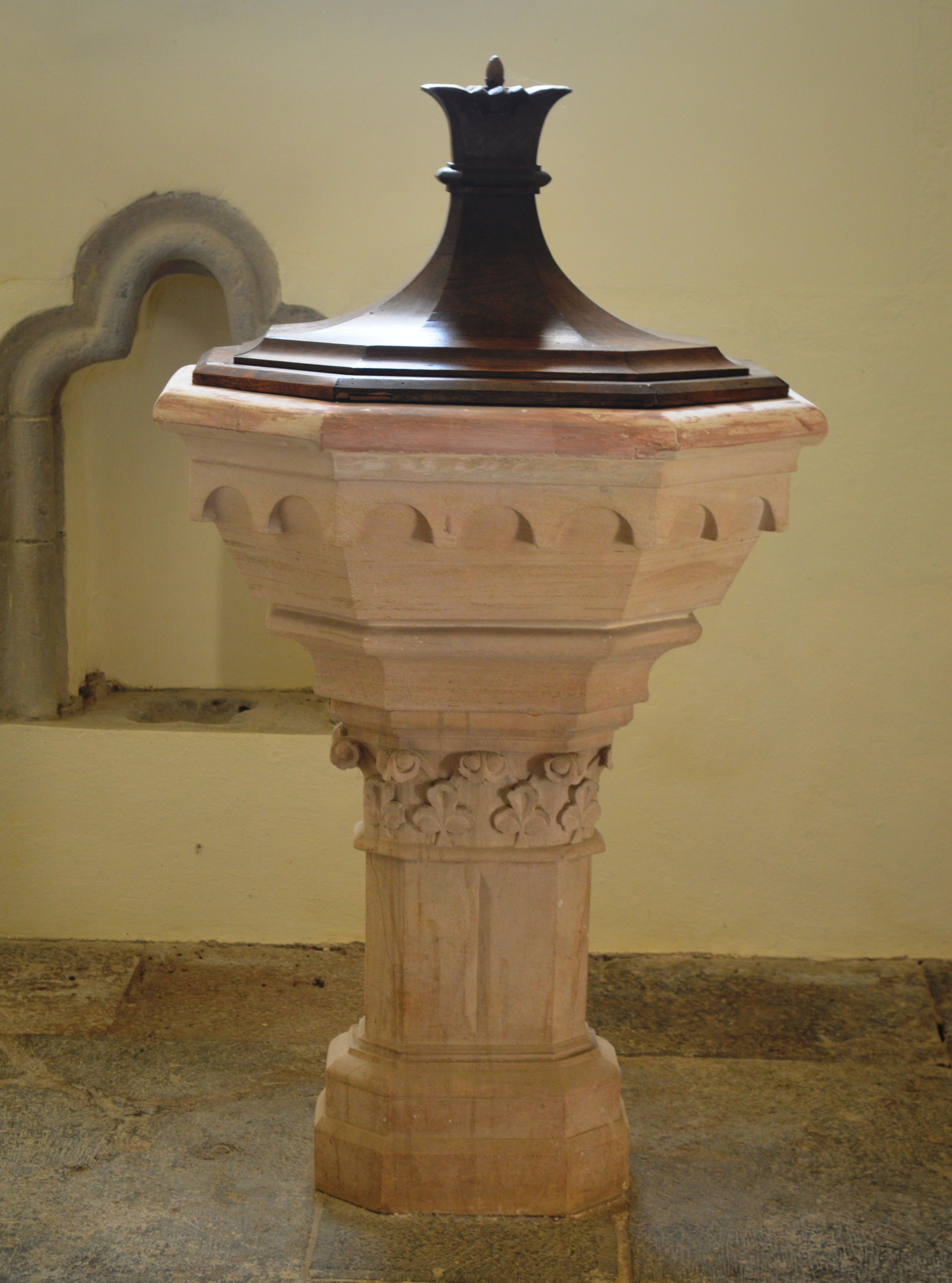
The Baptismal font

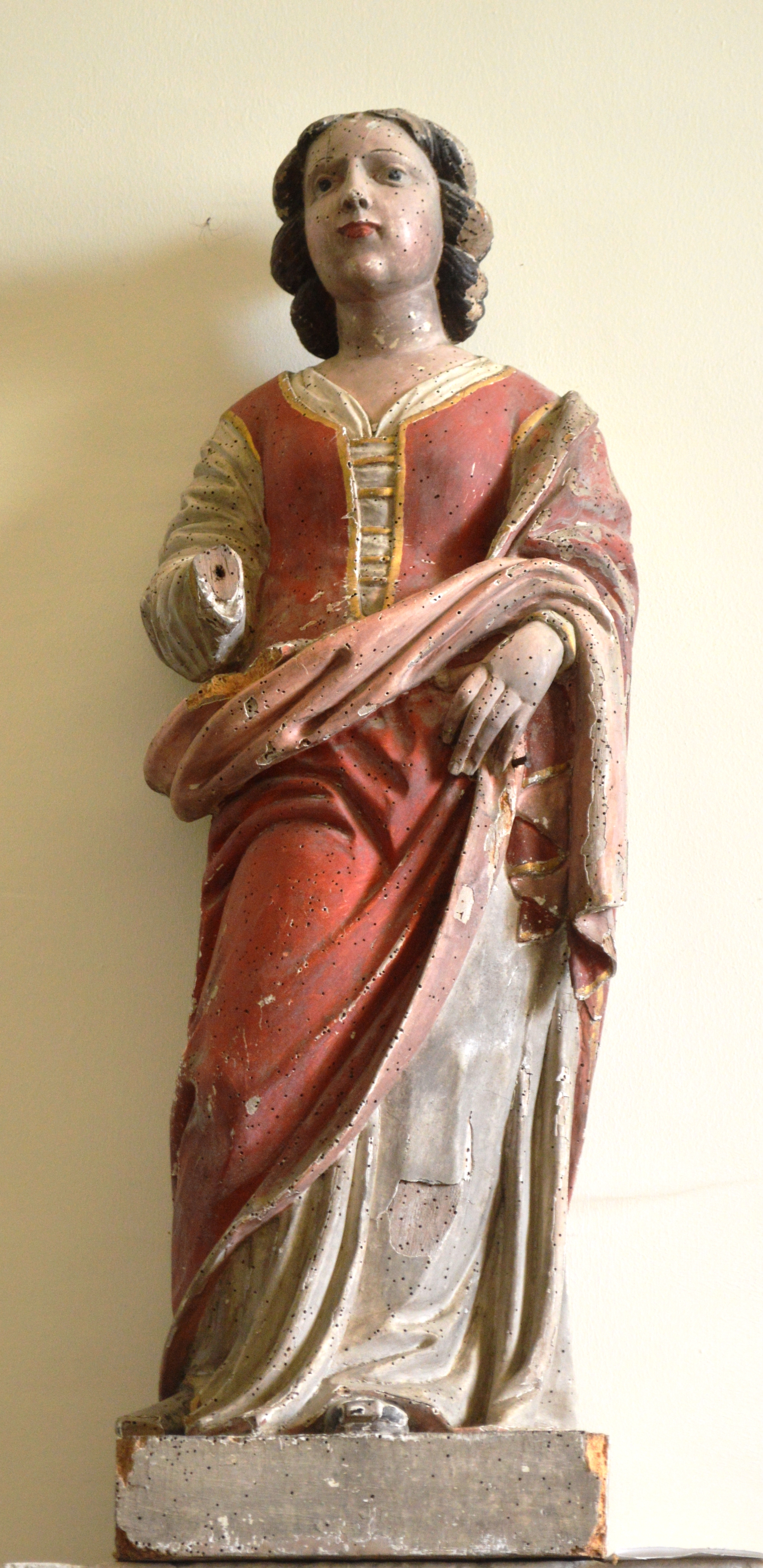
Statue: A Saint

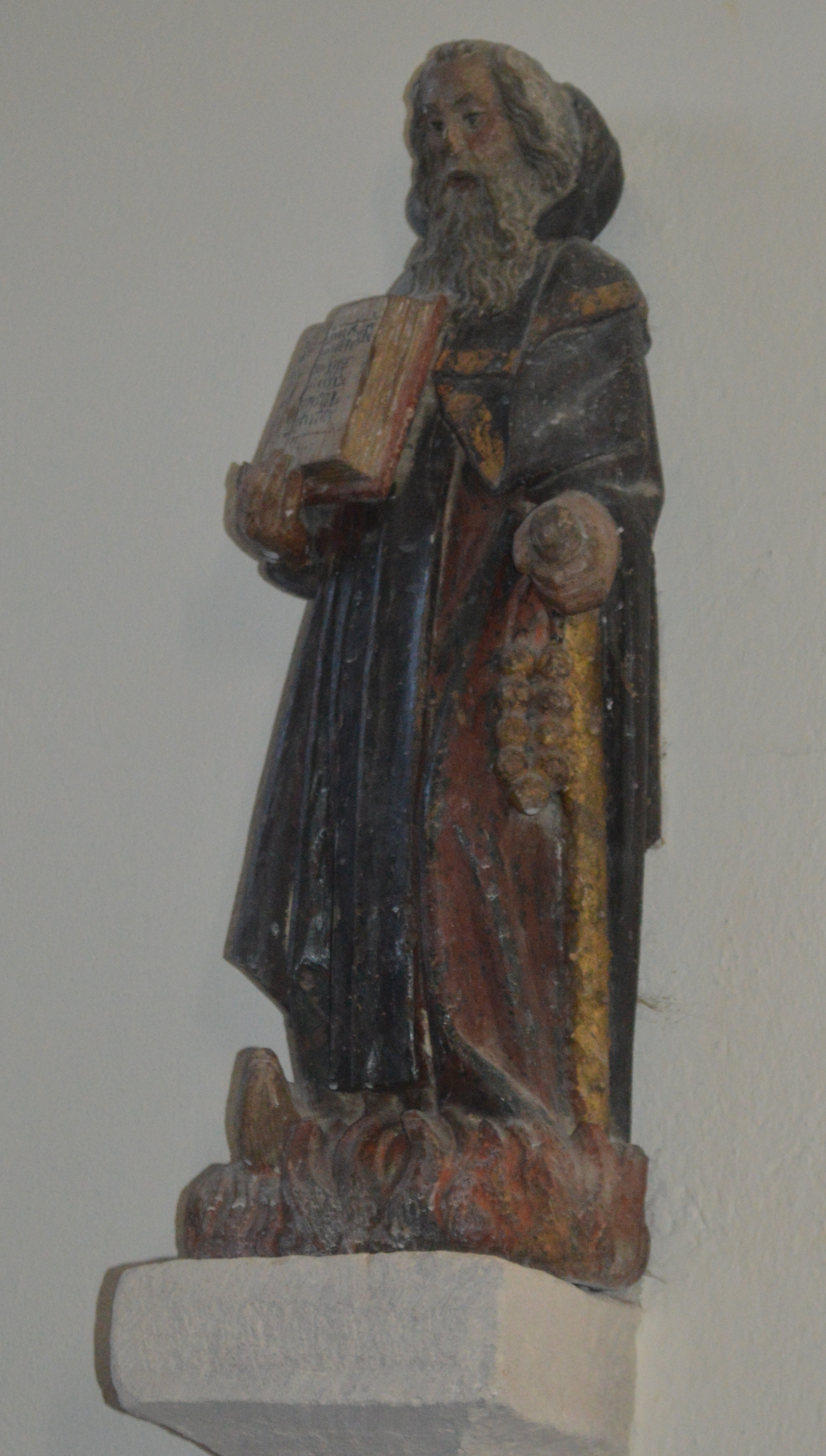
Statue: Saint John the Baptist

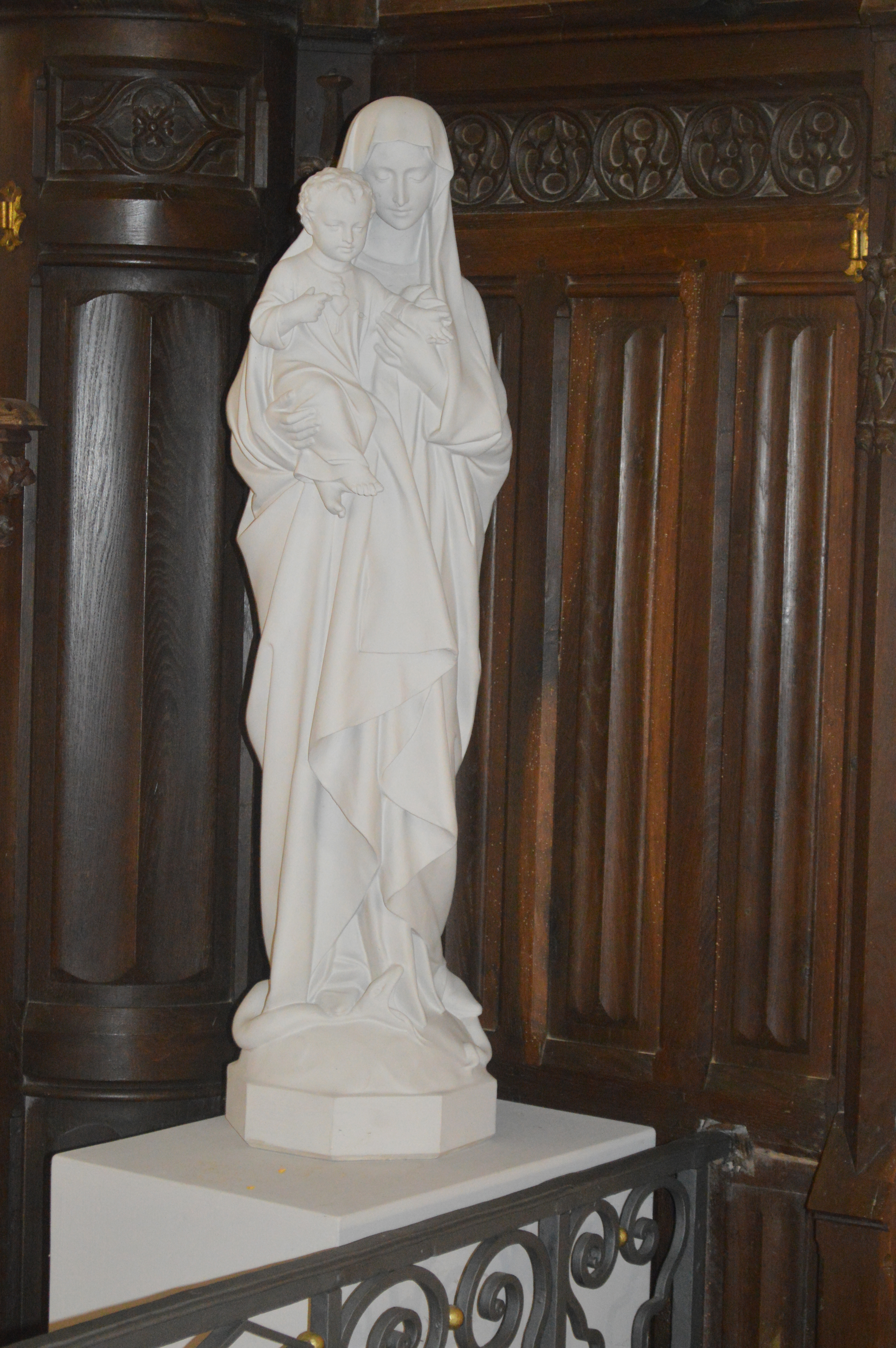
Statue: Virgin and child

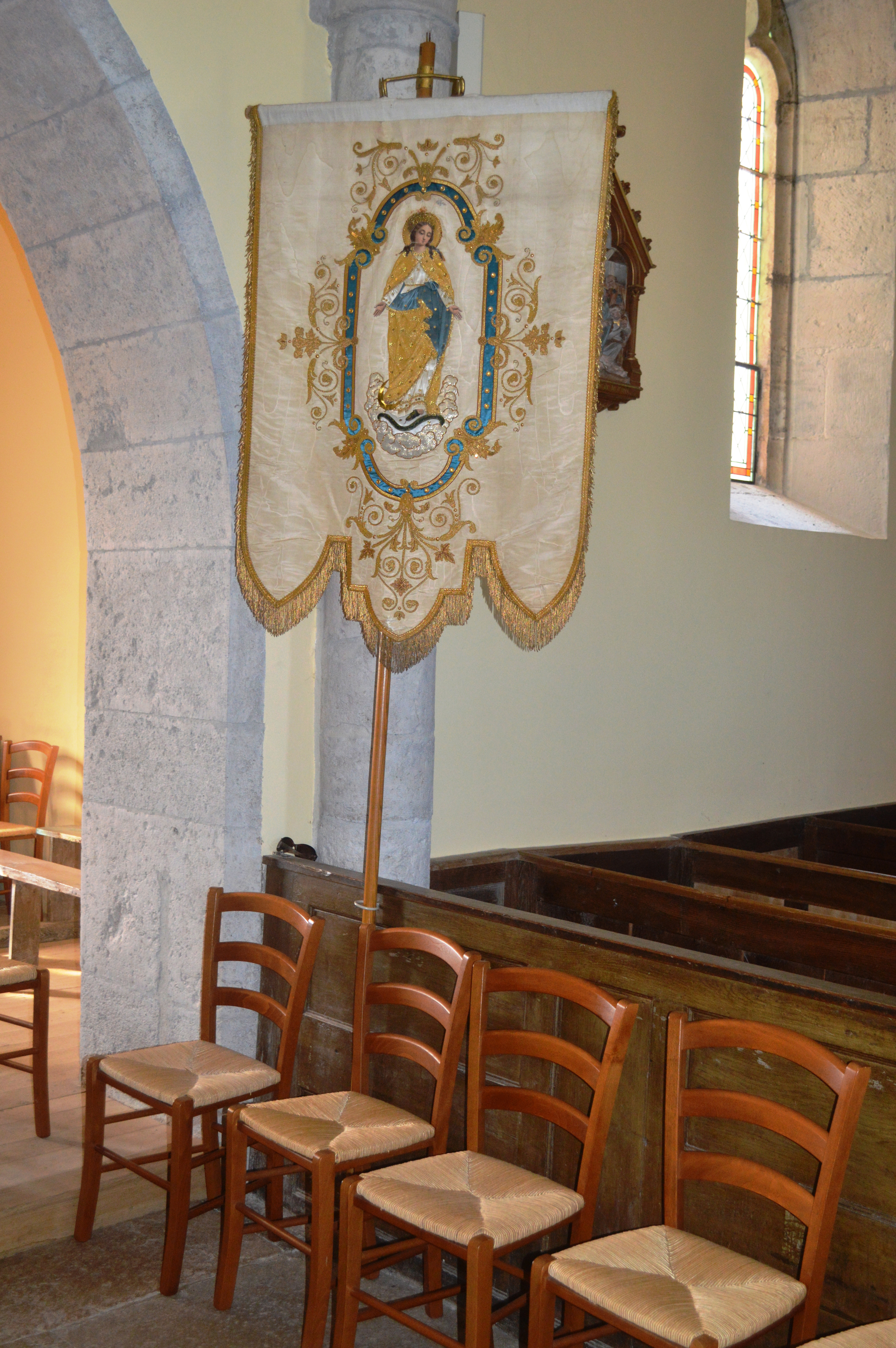
A Processional Banner

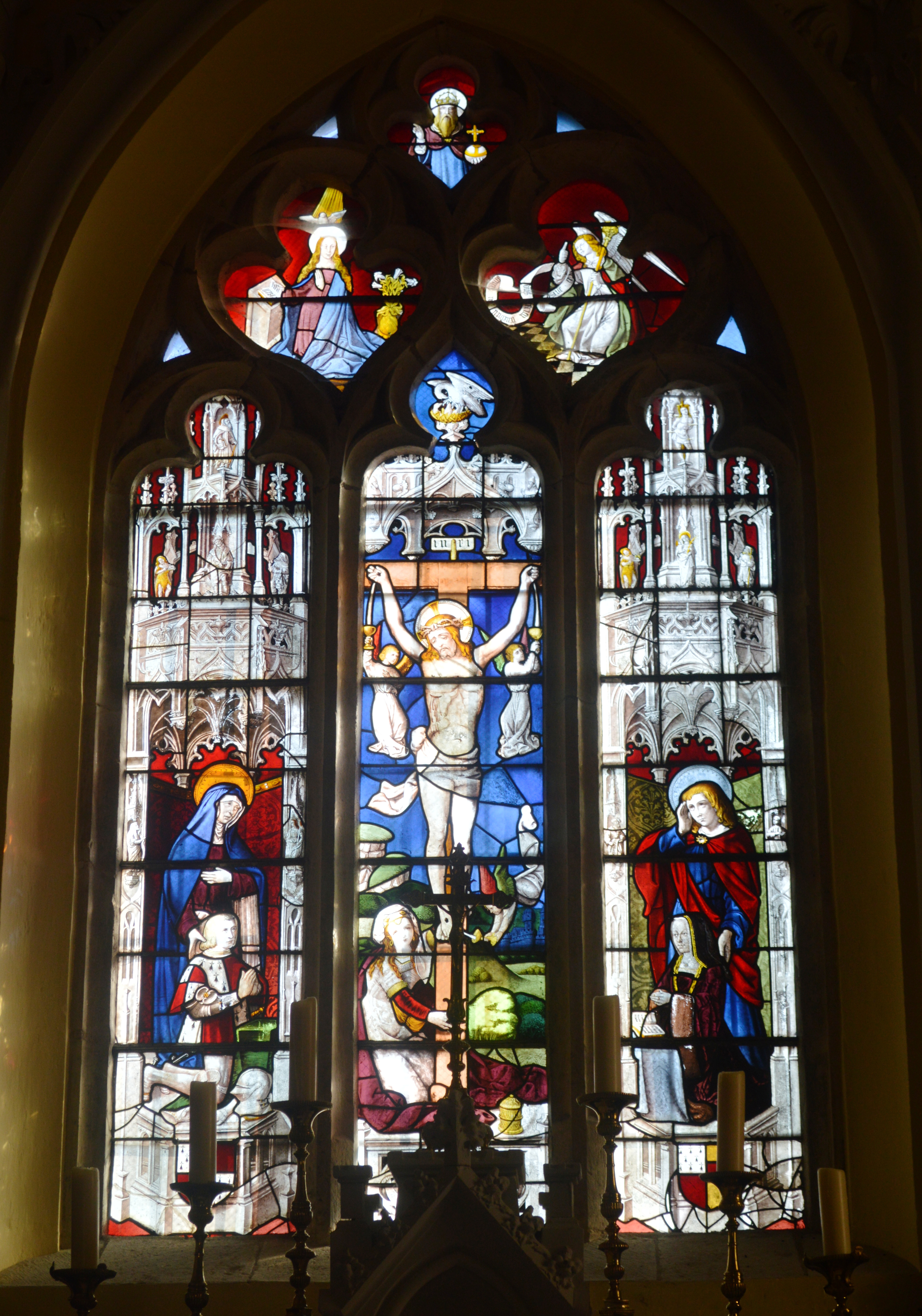
Stained Glass: The Crucifixion

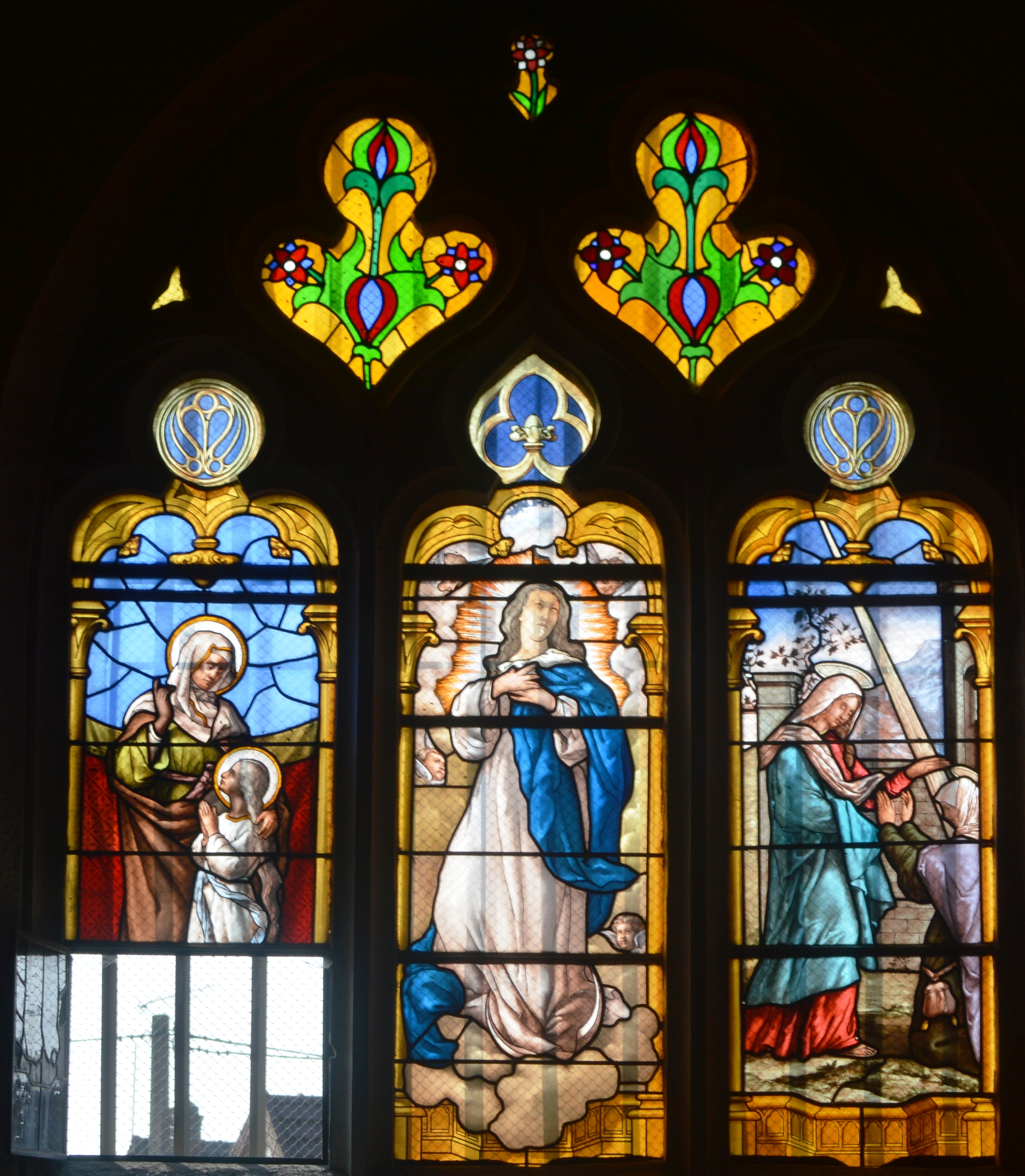
Stained Glass: God the Father

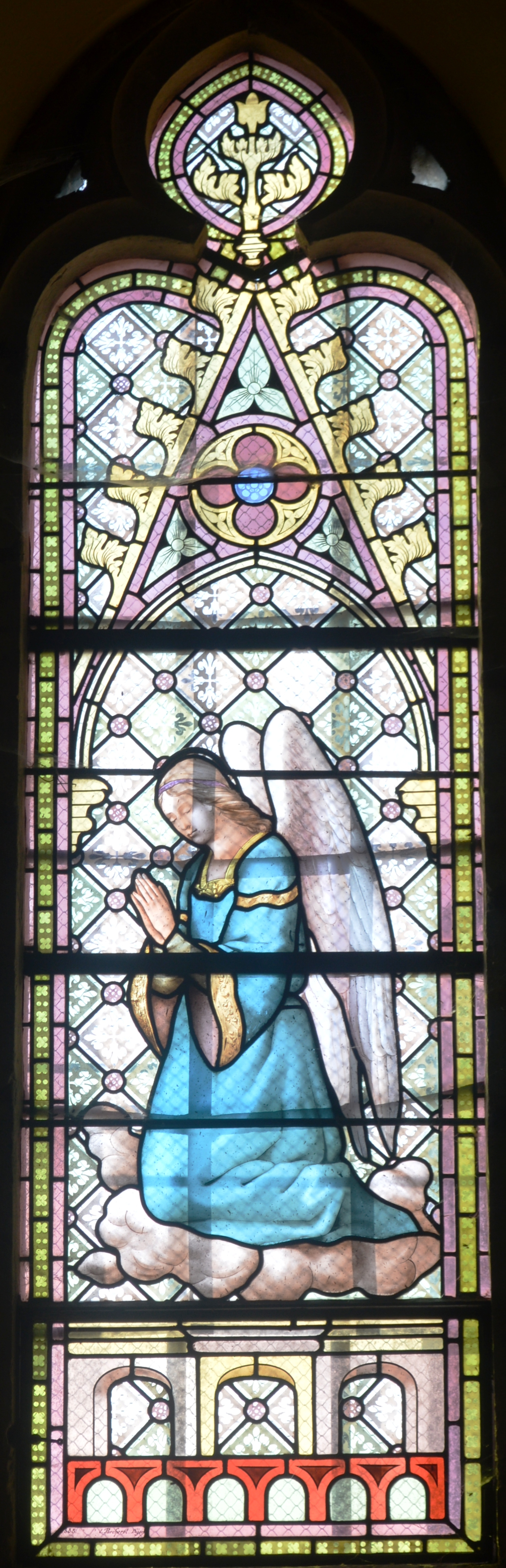
Stained Glass

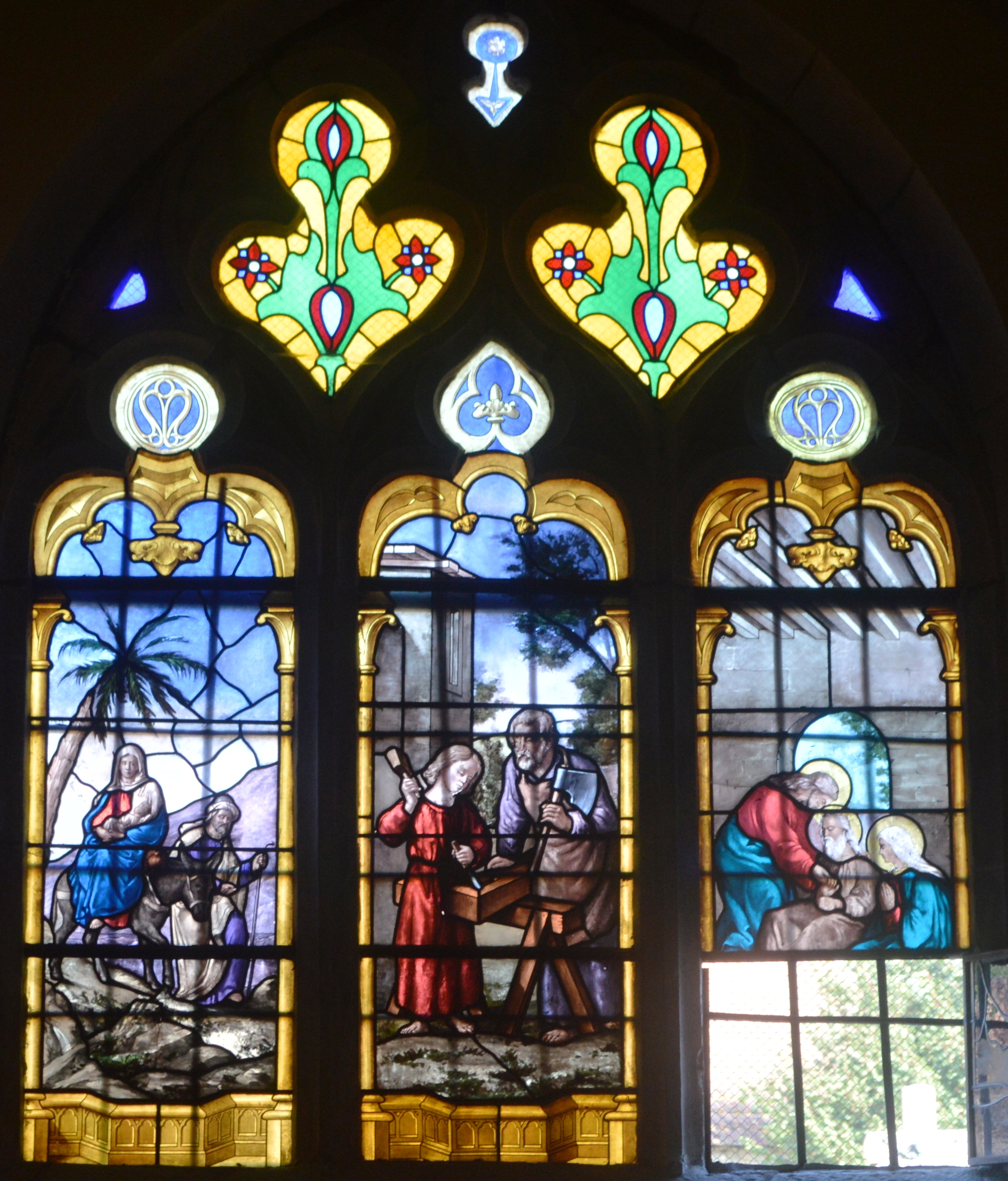
Stained Glass

== See also ==
- Communes of the Côte-d'Or department
