= Allerey =

- Commune
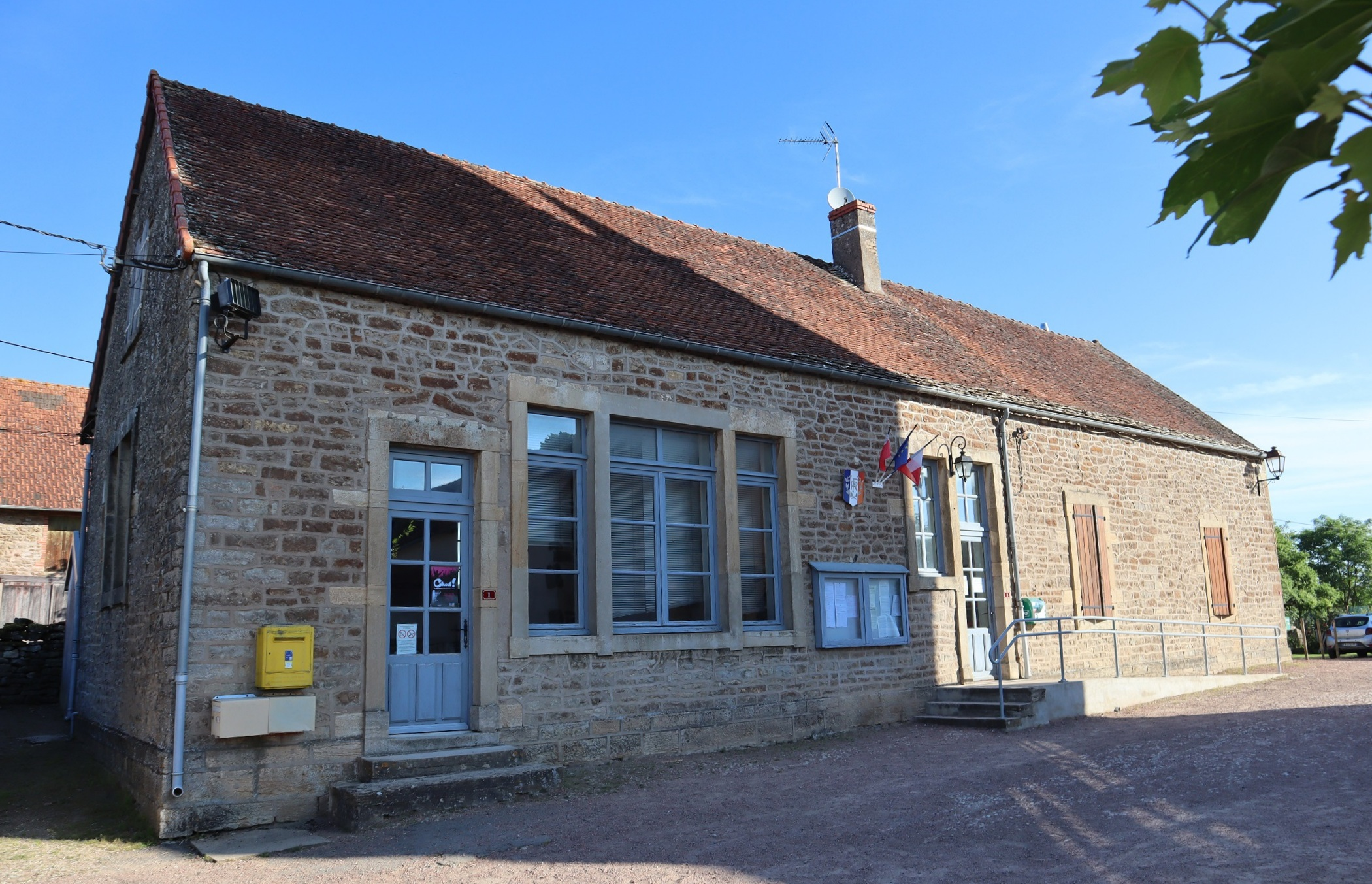
- Town hall
- Location of Allerey
- Location within France Location within Bourgogne-Franche-Comté
- Coordinates: 47°11′24″N 4°26′21″E
- Country: France
- Region: Bourgogne-Franche-Comté
- Department: Côte-d'Or
- Arrondissement: Beaune
- Canton: Arnay-le-Duc

Government
  - Mayor (2020–2026): Robert Feurtet
- Area^{1}: 18.99 km^{2} (7.33 sq mi)
- Highest elevation: 528 m (1,732 ft)
- Lowest elevation: 350 m (1,150 ft)
- Population (2023): 174
  - Density: 9.16/km^{2} (23.7/sq mi)
- Time zone: UTC+01:00 (CET)
  - Summer (DST): UTC+02:00 (CEST)
- INSEE/Postal code: 21009 /21230
- ^{1} French Land Register data, which excludes lakes, ponds, glaciers > 1 km^{2} (0.386 sq mi or 247 acres) and river estuaries.

Allerey (French pronunciation: [alʁɛ]) is a commune in the Côte-d'Or department in the Bourgogne-Franche-Comté region of eastern France.

== Geography ==
Allerey is located some 40 km north-west of Beaune and 30 km north by north-east of Autun. The D906 road passes through the western part of the commune but the village can only be accessed by smaller roads such as the D16 from the south which continues north-east to Arconcey, the D117A from the west which continues south-east to Arnay-le-Duc, and the D36 from Beurey-Bauguay in the north. The commune consists entirely of farmland except for the forested Bois de Come in the south-eastern corner.

The Ruisseau d'Angot rises in the west of the commune and flows south to join the Nailly river.

== History ==
Allerey was the seat of a lordship in the Middle Ages and there was a Fortified house in the centre of the commune.

== Administration ==
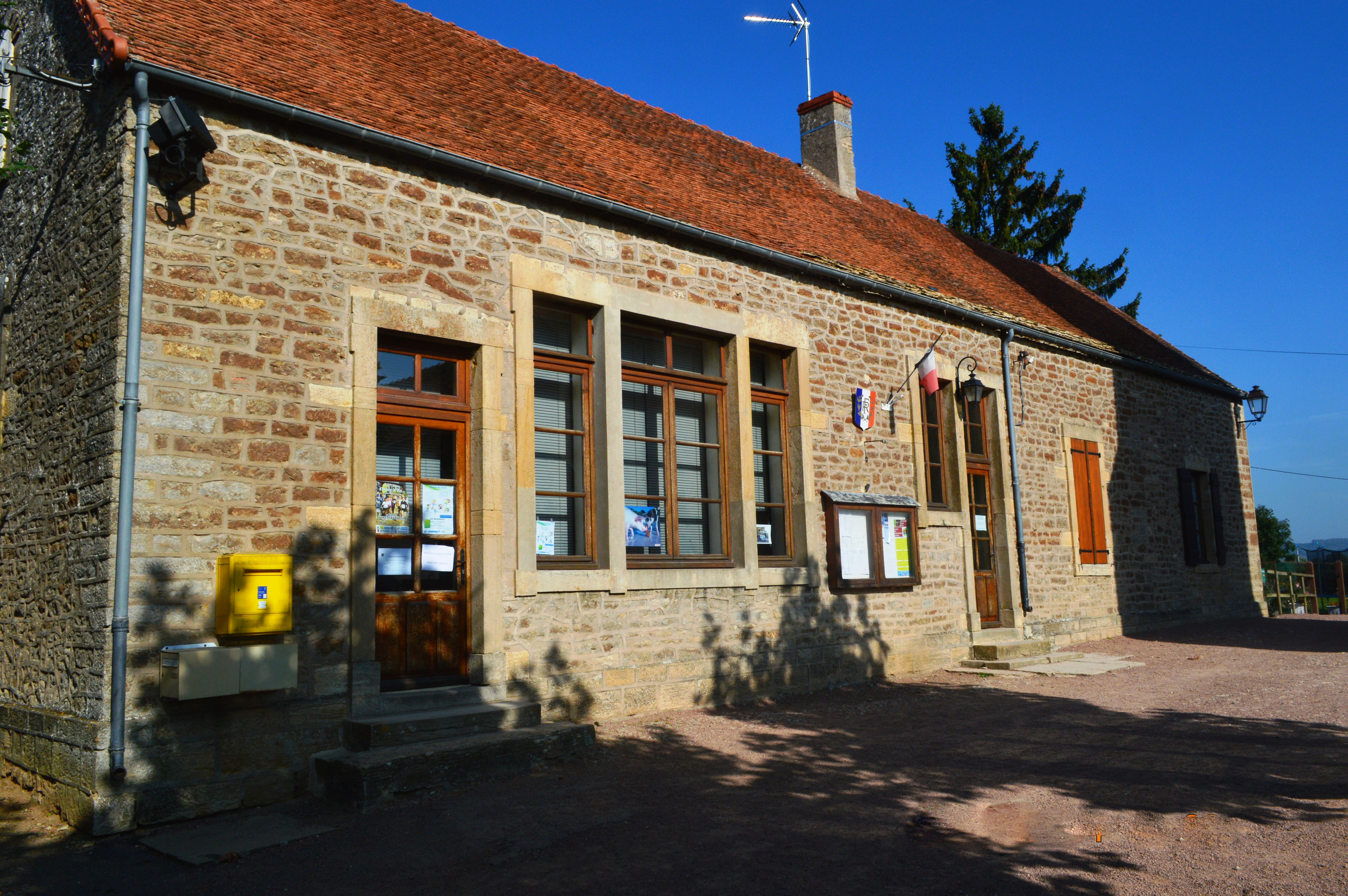
The Town Hall

List of Successive Mayors

From	To	Name
2001	2014	Pierre Jarlaud
2014	2020	Odette Mazilly
2020	2026	Robert Feurtet

== Demography ==
The inhabitants of the commune are known as Alériens or Alériennes in French.

Historical population

Year	Pop.	±% p.a.
1793	794	—
1821	787	−0.03%
1846	767	−0.10%
1872	684	−0.44%
1901	588	−0.52%
1926	381	−1.72%
1946	380	−0.01%
1962	355	−0.42%
1968	301	−2.71%

Year	Pop.	±% p.a.
1975	257	−2.23%
1982	222	−2.07%
1990	198	−1.42%
1999	181	−0.99%
2007	172	−0.64%
2012	168	−0.47%
2017	170	+0.24%
2023	174	+0.39%

Source: EHESS and INSEE

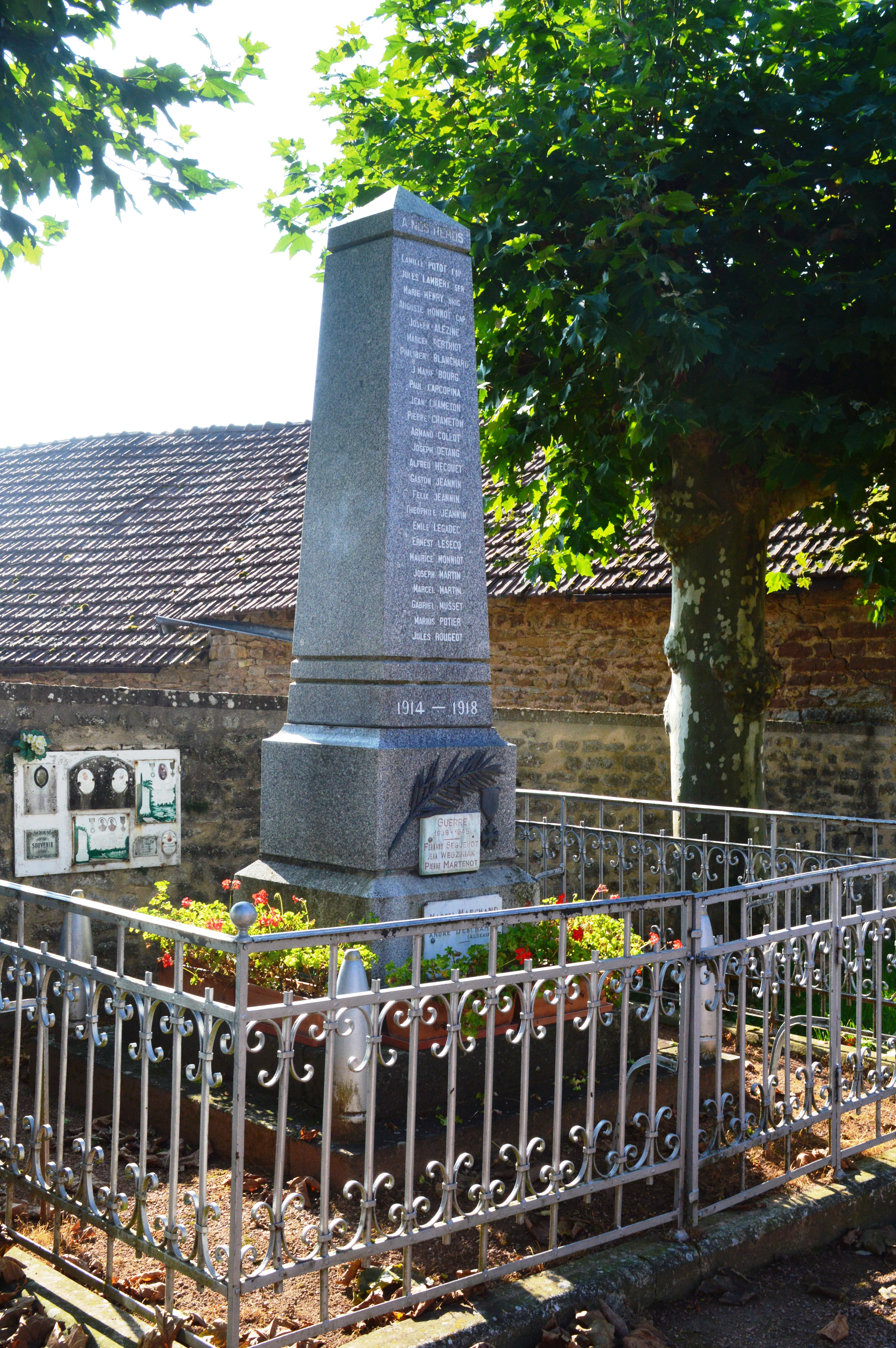
Allerey War Memorial

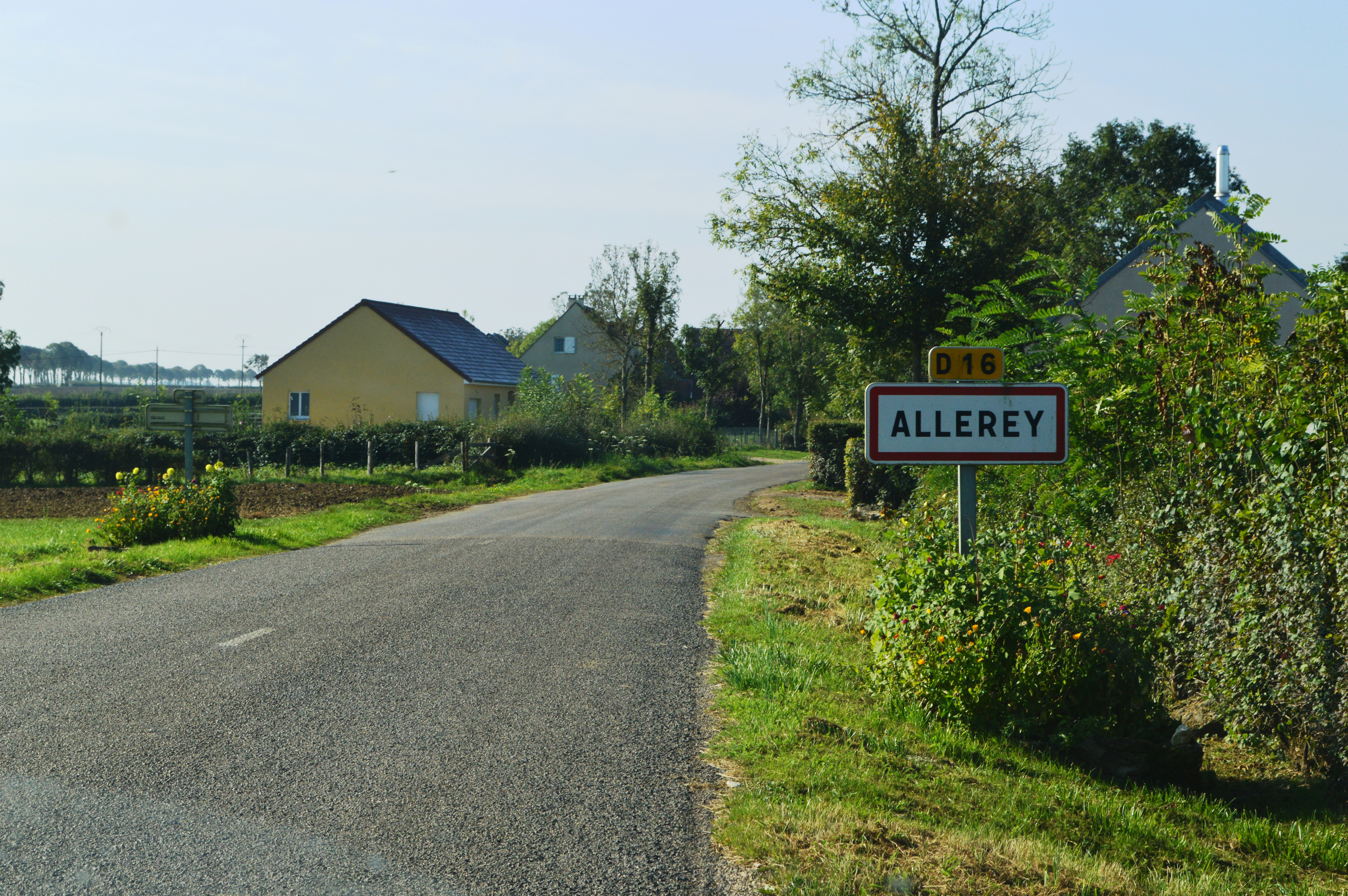
The entry to Allerey

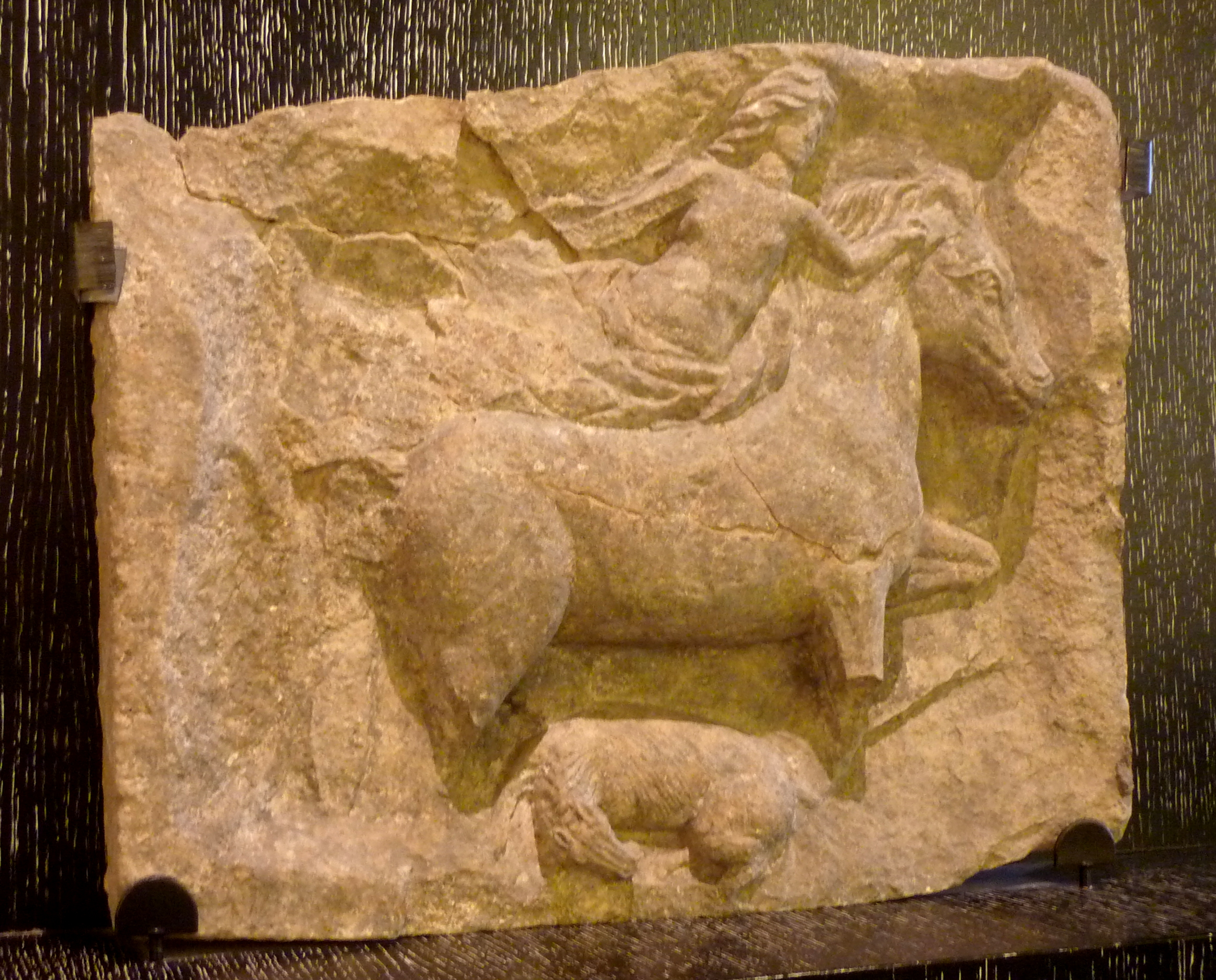
Gallo-Roman Statue of Epona from Allerey, Dijon Archaeological Museum

== Sites and monuments ==
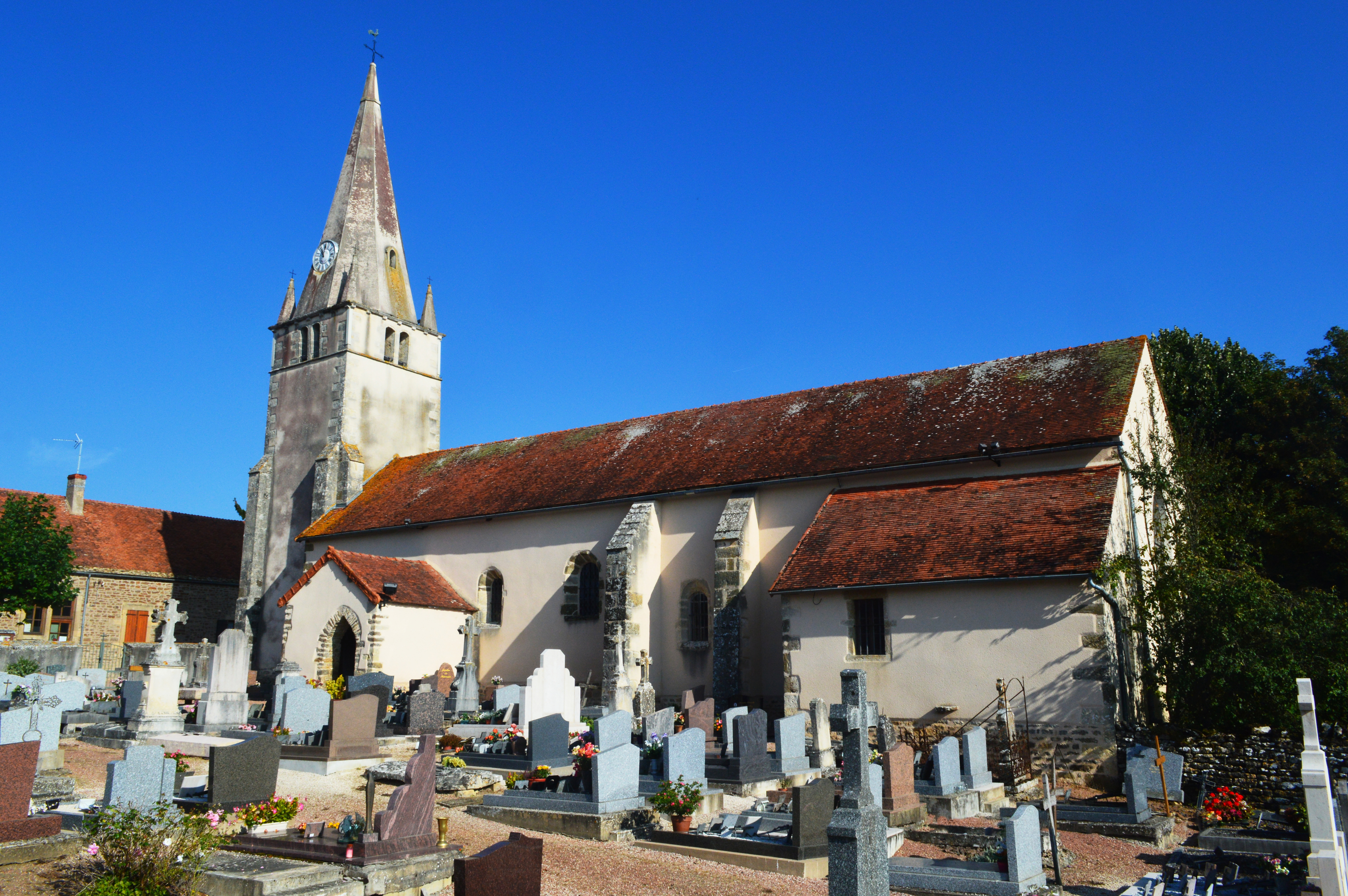
The Church of Saint Pierre

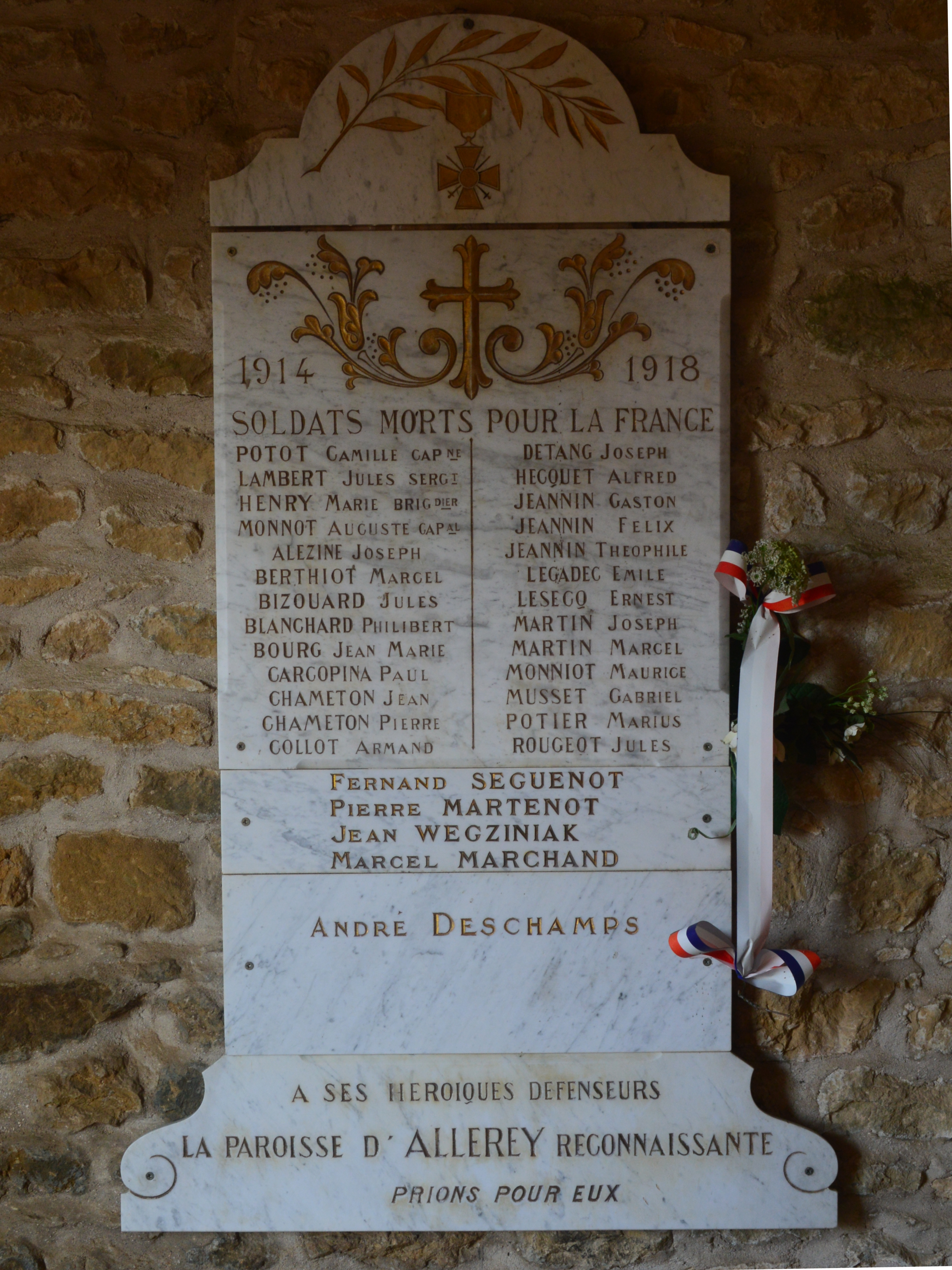
Church War Memorial

The Church of Saint-Pierre contains two items that are registered as historical objects:

- The Furniture in the Church
- A Stained glass figure (Bay 0) (16th century)

== See also ==
- Communes of the Côte-d'Or department
