= Beurey-Bauguay =

- Commune
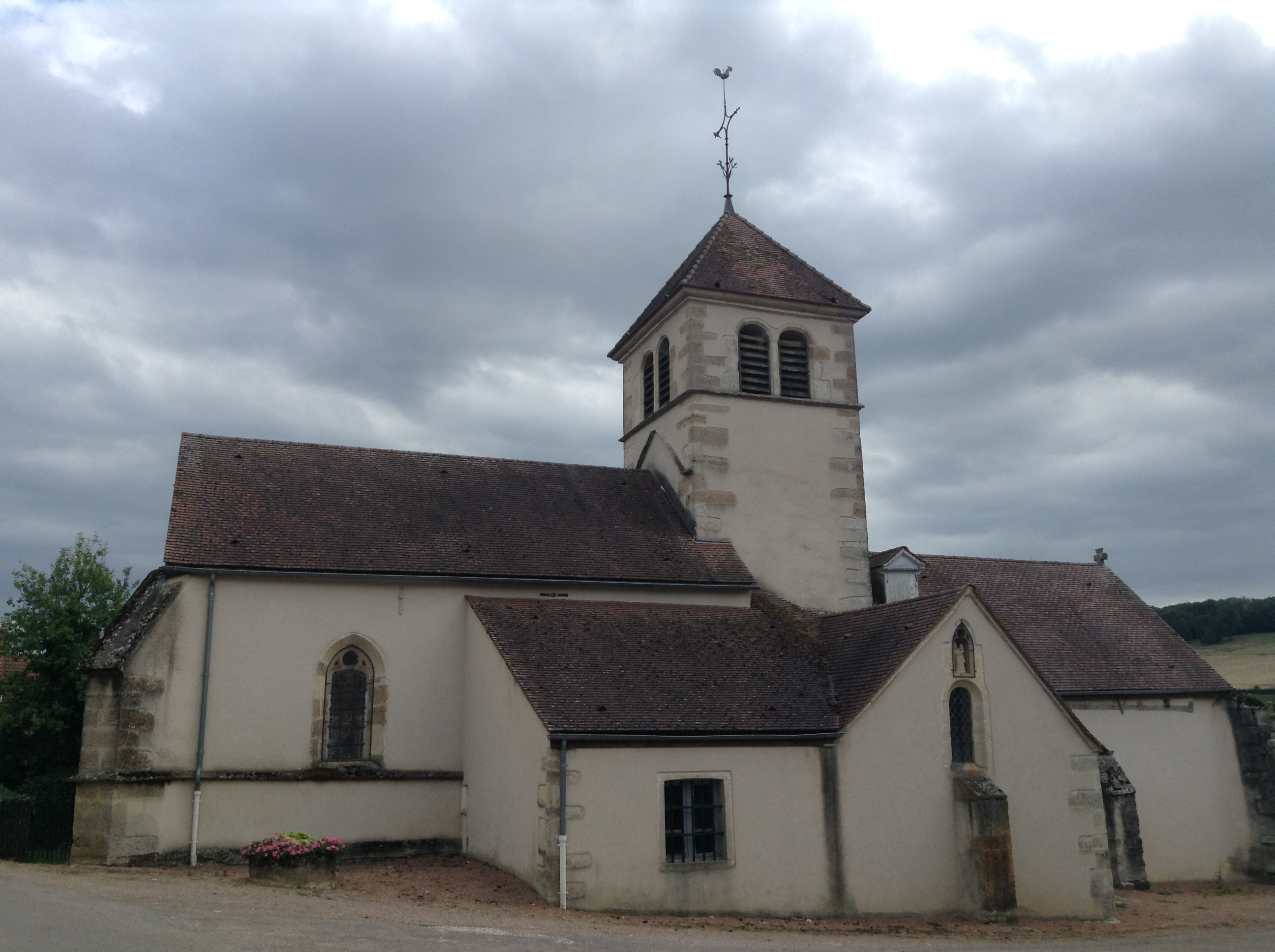
- The church in Beurey-Bauguay
- Location of Beurey-Bauguay
- Location within France Location within Bourgogne-Franche-Comté
- Coordinates: 47°14′00″N 4°25′29″E
- Country: France
- Region: Bourgogne-Franche-Comté
- Department: Côte-d'Or
- Arrondissement: Beaune
- Canton: Arnay-le-Duc

Government
  - Mayor (2020–2026): Corinne Maugey
- Area^{1}: 7.3 km^{2} (2.8 sq mi)
- Elevation: 400 m (1,300 ft)
- Highest elevation: 536 m (1,759 ft)
- Lowest elevation: 392 m (1,286 ft)
- Population (2023): 130
  - Density: 18/km^{2} (46/sq mi)
- Time zone: UTC+01:00 (CET)
  - Summer (DST): UTC+02:00 (CEST)
- INSEE/Postal code: 21068 /21320
- ^{1} French Land Register data, which excludes lakes, ponds, glaciers > 1 km^{2} (0.386 sq mi or 247 acres) and river estuaries.

Beurey-Bauguay (French pronunciation: [bøʁɛ boɡɛ]) is a commune in the Côte-d'Or department in eastern France.

== Population ==
Historical population
Year	Pop.	±% p.a.
1968	123	—
1975	100	−2.91%
1982	80	−3.14%
1990	86	+0.91%
1999	91	+0.63%
2007	133	+4.86%
2012	136	+0.45%
2017	110	−4.15%
2023	130	+2.82%
Source: INSEE

== See also ==
- Communes of the Côte-d'Or department
