= Jean de Beaumetz =

French painter

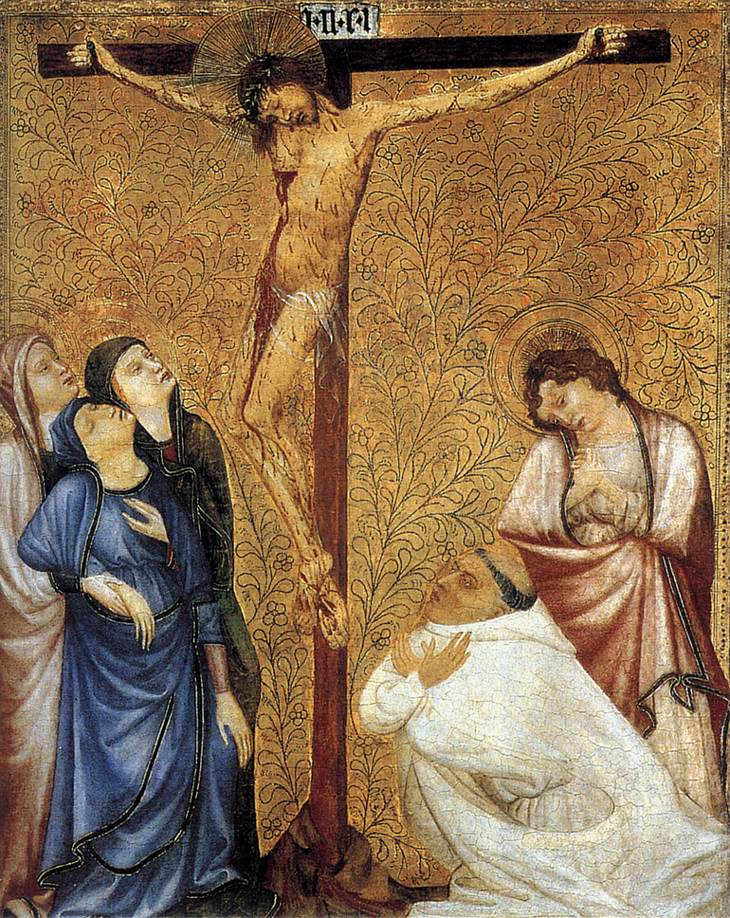
Christ on the Cross with a Praying Carthusian Monk, ca. 1390–1395. Now at the Cleveland Museum of Art.

Jean de Beaumetz is recorded to have been "painter and valet" to Philip the Bold, for whom he painted numerous works, and decorated, among other chapels, that of the Castle of Argilli, in Burgundy. Some of his mural paintings are still preserved at château de Germolles. Jean de Beaumetz was employed by his patron from about 1375 to 1395.

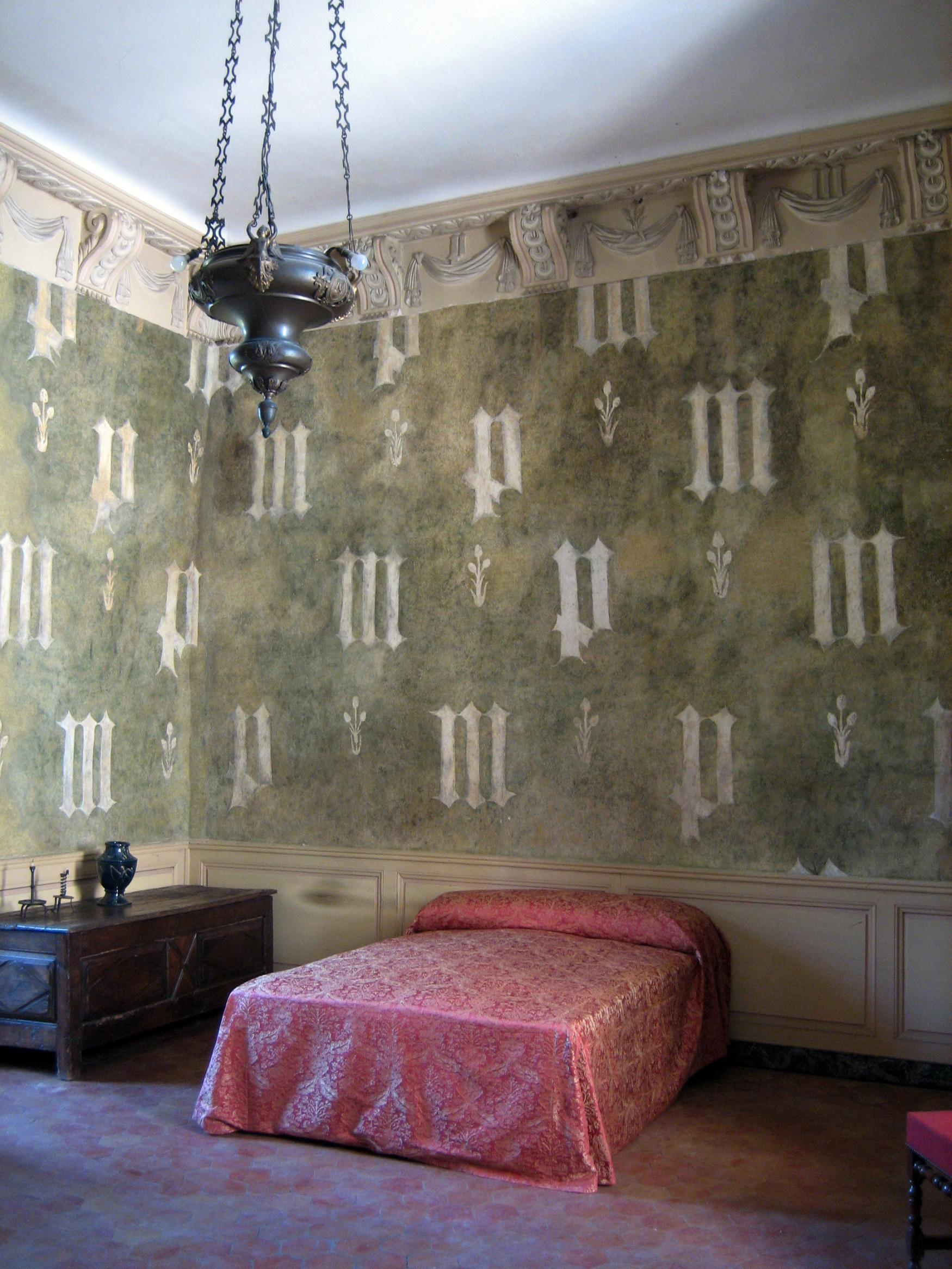
Mural paintings of the dressing room of Margaret of Bavaria, château de Germolles, realised by the workshop of Jean de Beaumetz, from 1389
