= Bagnot =

- Commune
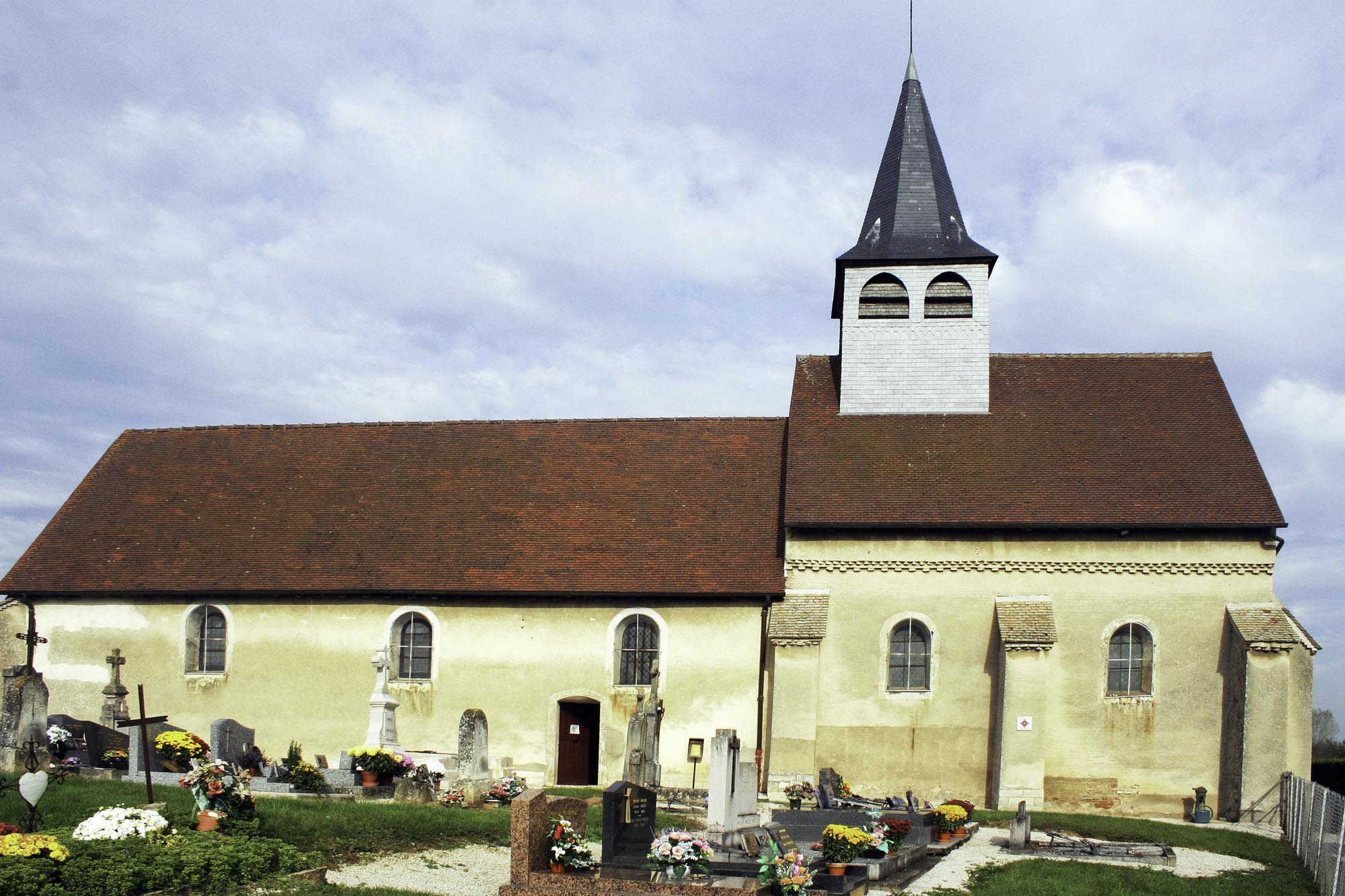
- The Church of the Nativity
- Location of Bagnot
- Location within France Location within Bourgogne-Franche-Comté
- Coordinates: 47°03′36″N 5°04′35″E
- Country: France
- Region: Bourgogne-Franche-Comté
- Department: Côte-d'Or
- Arrondissement: Beaune
- Canton: Brazey-en-Plaine
- Intercommunality: Rives de Saône

Government
  - Mayor (2020–2026): Mary-Claude Thurillat
- Area^{1}: 12.57 km^{2} (4.85 sq mi)
- Elevation: 197 m (646 ft)
- Highest elevation: 216 m (709 ft)
- Lowest elevation: 189 m (620 ft)
- Population (2023): 154
  - Density: 12.3/km^{2} (31.7/sq mi)
- Time zone: UTC+01:00 (CET)
  - Summer (DST): UTC+02:00 (CEST)
- INSEE/Postal code: 21042 /21700
- ^{1} French Land Register data, which excludes lakes, ponds, glaciers > 1 km^{2} (0.386 sq mi or 247 acres) and river estuaries.

Bagnot (French pronunciation: [baɲo]) is a commune in the Côte-d'Or department in the Bourgogne-Franche-Comté region of eastern France.

== Geography ==
Bagnot is located some 30 km south of Dijon and 15 km east by north-east of Beaune. Access to the commune is by the D20 from Argilly in the west which passes through the village and continues east to Auvillars-sur-Saône. The D35E goes south from the village to the D973. The A36 autoroute passes through the south of the commune from west to east but has no exit in the commune. The nearest exit is Exit 1 some 5 km east of the commune. The commune is extensively forested in the south with forests also in the north-west; the centre of the commune is farmland.

The Sereine river flows through the commune and the village from the north-east and continues south-west to join the Meuzin near Palleau. Two tributaries feed the Sereine from the commune - one fed by the Étang de Menans just west of the commune and the other from the Grand Étang west of the village. Another stream rises in the east of the commune and flows east through the Étang Limonet and Étang du Moulin, both just east of the commune, to the Saône river at Glanon.

== Administration ==
List of Successive Mayors

From	To	Name
2001	2026	Mary Claude Thurillat

== Demography ==
The inhabitants of the commune are known as Bagnotins or Bagnotines in French.

Historical population

Year	Pop.	±% p.a.
1793	322	—
1821	325	+0.03%
1846	353	+0.33%
1872	277	−0.93%
1901	261	−0.20%
1926	178	−1.52%
1946	144	−1.05%
1962	120	−1.13%
1968	120	+0.00%

Year	Pop.	±% p.a.
1975	118	−0.24%
1982	147	+3.19%
1990	133	−1.24%
1999	124	−0.78%
2007	127	+0.30%
2012	150	+3.38%
2017	161	+1.43%
2023	154	−0.74%

Source: EHESS and INSEE

== Culture and heritage ==
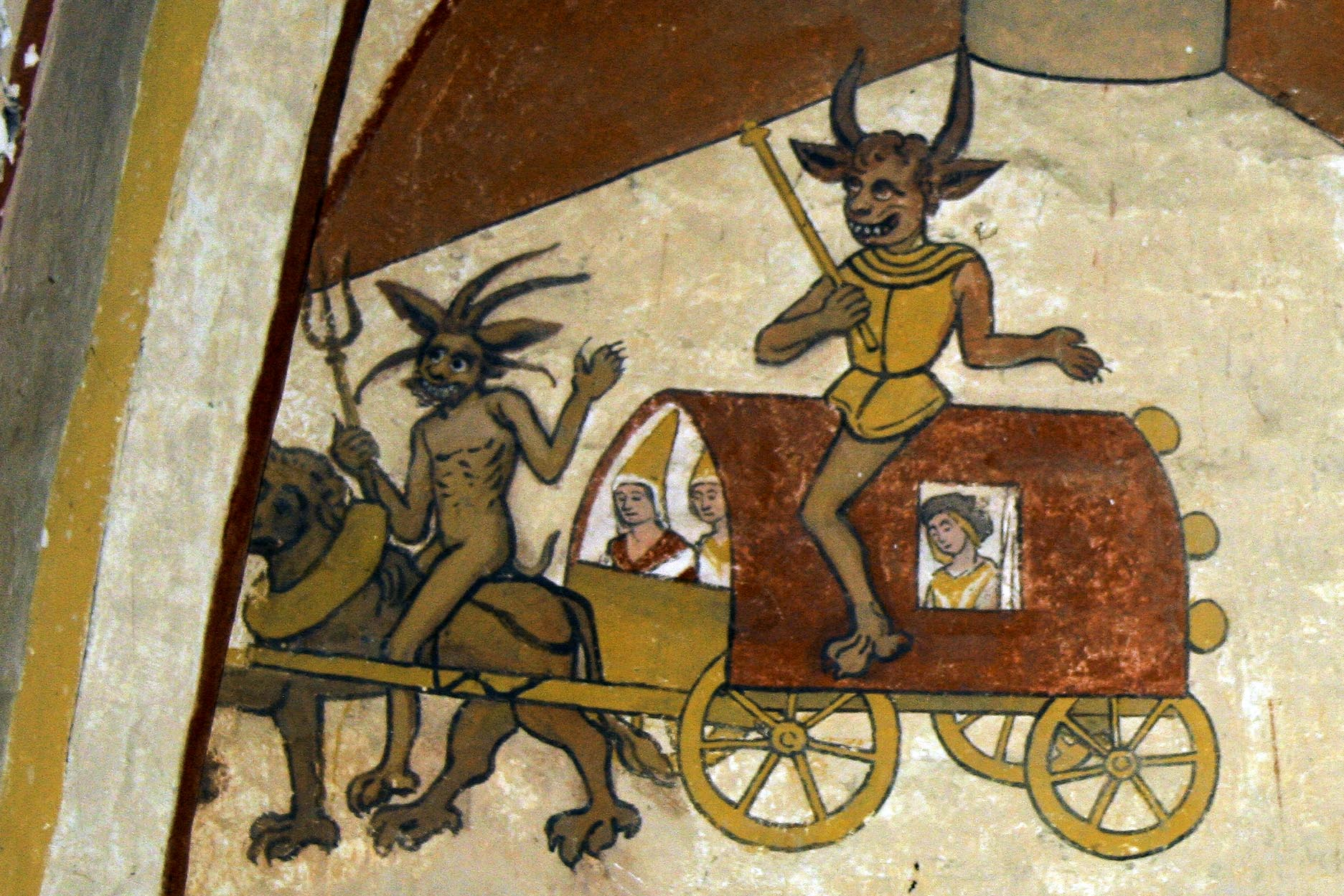
The Diables de Bagnot

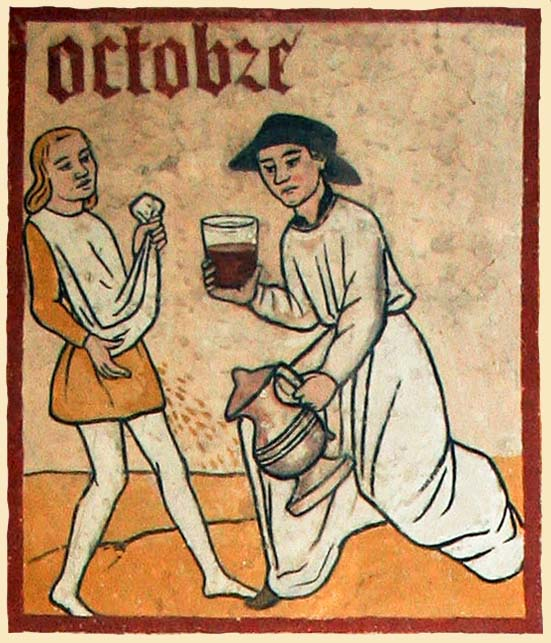
October from the Calendar in the Choir Arch

=== Civil heritage ===
The commune has a number of buildings and structures that are registered as historical monuments:

- A Farmhouse at CVO 2 Meix Martin (18th century)
- A Farmhouse at D20 (1842)
- A Town Hall/School at D20 (19th century)
- A Farmhouse at Les Granges de Bagnot (18th century) The Farmhouse contains a Statue of the Sacred Heart (19th century) which is registered as an historical object.
- Houses and Farms (18th-19th century)

=== Religious heritage ===
The commune has several religious buildings and sites that are registered as historical monuments:

- A Cemetery Cross at D20 (19th century)
- A Presbytery at D20 (19th century)
- The Church of the Nativity (12th century). The Church is a Romanesque building novel originally from the 12th and 13th centuries and later redesigned. It is decorated with murals from the 15th century (they are dated 1484) on the theme of the Last Judgment which were discovered in 1862. In particular there are the Diables de Bagnot (The Devils of Bagnot) that made this church famous. The walls and the choir vaults depict scenes from sacred history: The Annunciation, Saints, Evangelists, and donors. The arch in the choir is decorated with a calendar representing the twelve months of the year with scenes of daily life. The Church contains a large number of items that are registered as historical objects.

== See also ==
- Communes of the Côte-d'Or department
