= Auvillars-sur-Saône =

- Commune
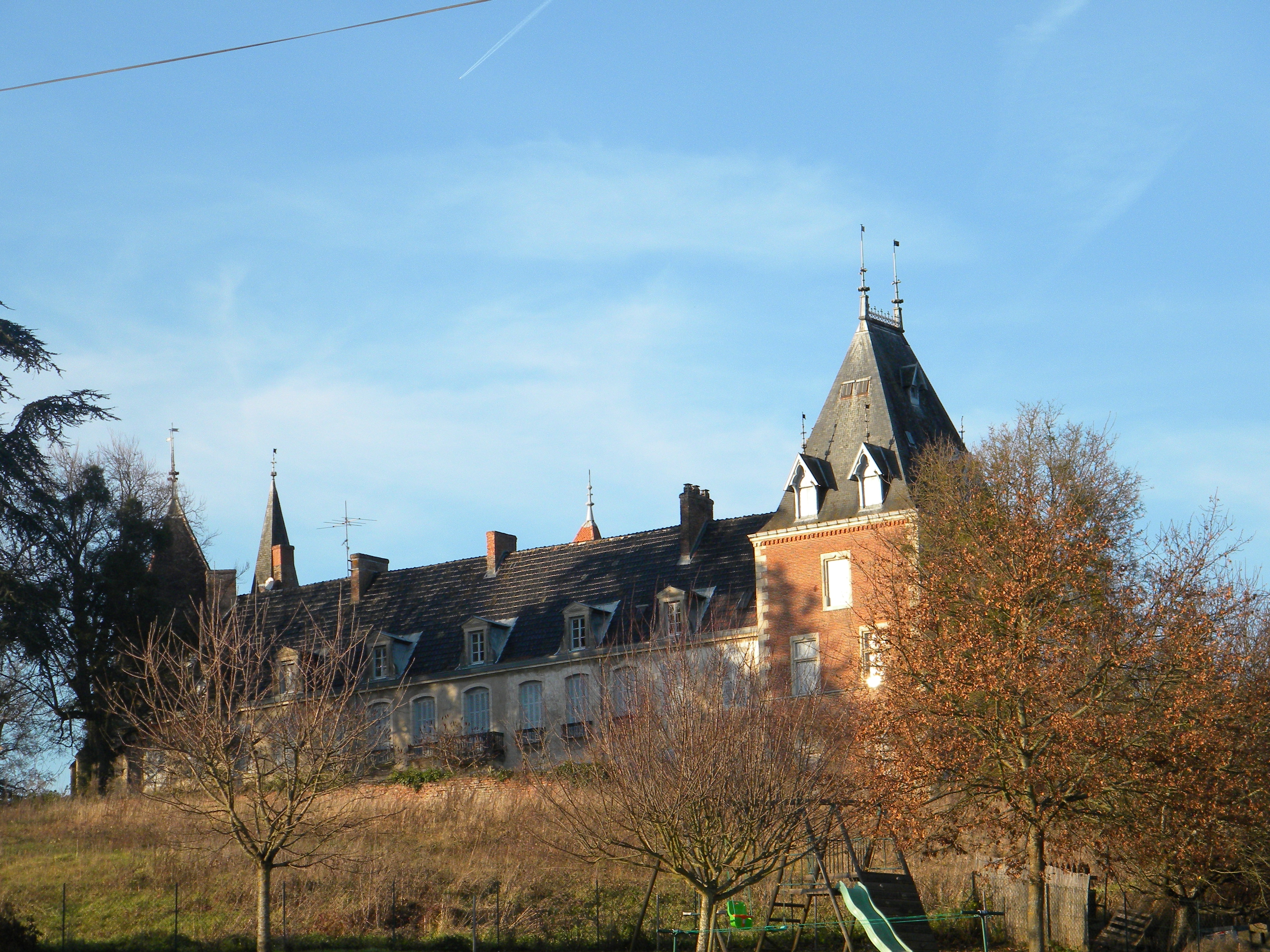
- The Castle

- Coat of arms
- Location of Auvillars-sur-Saône
- Location within France Location within Bourgogne-Franche-Comté
- Coordinates: 47°03′47″N 5°06′11″E
- Country: France
- Region: Bourgogne-Franche-Comté
- Department: Côte-d'Or
- Arrondissement: Beaune
- Canton: Brazey-en-Plaine
- Intercommunality: CC Rives Saône

Government
  - Mayor (2020–2026): Marc Jaudaux
- Area^{1}: 6.74 km^{2} (2.60 sq mi)
- Elevation: 231 m (758 ft)
- Highest elevation: 226 m (741 ft)
- Lowest elevation: 176 m (577 ft)
- Population (2023): 343
  - Density: 50.9/km^{2} (132/sq mi)
- Time zone: UTC+01:00 (CET)
  - Summer (DST): UTC+02:00 (CEST)
- INSEE/Postal code: 21035 /21250
- ^{1} French Land Register data, which excludes lakes, ponds, glaciers > 1 km^{2} (0.386 sq mi or 247 acres) and river estuaries.

Auvillars-sur-Saône (French pronunciation: [ovilaʁ syʁ son], literally Auvillars on Saône) is a commune in the Côte-d'Or department in the Bourgogne-Franche-Comté region of eastern France.

== Geography ==
Auvillars-sur-Saône is located some 14 km south-east of Nuits-Saint-Georges and 20 km east by north-east of Beaune. Access to the commune is by the D996 road from Corcelles-lès-Cîteaux in the north which passes south down the western side of the commune to Pouilly-sur-Saône. The D35A branches off the D996 in the commune and goes to the village then continues south to Glanon. The D20 branches west off the D996 and goes to Bagnot. Apart from the village there is the hamlet of Auvillars in the south. Apart from patches of forest in the centre of the commune the land is all farmland.

The Saône river forms the eastern boundary of the commune as it flows south to eventually join the Rhône at Lyon. The Raie du Lac flows south through the centre of the commune to join the Saône.

== History ==
The Chateau was built in 1409 by Jean de Saint-Hilaire and damaged in 1636 by the troops of Matthias Gallas.

=== Heraldry ===
Arms of Auvillars-sur-Saône	Blazon: Or, a fesse wavy of Azure abased between an eagle in chief of sable and in base two boar heads erased the same surmounted by a mullet of 6 points in Gules; in chief Azure with two cinquefoils of Or.

== Administration ==
List of Successive Mayors

From	To	Name
2001	2014	Georges Louis Henry
2014	2026	Marc Jaudaux

== Demography ==
The inhabitants of the commune are known as Auvillerois or Auvilleroises in French.

Historical population

Year	Pop.	±% p.a.
1793	409	—
1821	505	+0.76%
1846	514	+0.07%
1872	477	−0.29%
1901	381	−0.77%
1926	283	−1.18%
1946	252	−0.58%
1962	211	−1.10%
1968	201	−0.81%

Year	Pop.	±% p.a.
1975	174	−2.04%
1982	180	+0.49%
1990	215	+2.25%
1999	212	−0.16%
2007	283	+3.68%
2012	321	+2.55%
2017	331	+0.62%
2023	343	+0.60%

Source: EHESS and INSEE

== Culture and heritage ==
=== Civil heritage ===
The commune has a number of buildings and structures that are registered as historical monuments:

- A Lavoir (Public laundry) (19th century)
- A Farmhouse at CR 11 (19th century)
- A Manor House at CR 14 (18th century)
- A Farmhouse at CR 21 (19th century)
- A School at CR 21 (1876)
- The Town Hall at CR 21 (19th century)
- A Farmhouse at CR 4 (18th century)
- A Farmhouse at Rue Corné (18th century)
- A Farmhouse at Rue des Creux (1817)
- A Farmhouse at Rue du Creux Bâton (1) (18th century)
- A Farmhouse at Rue du Creux Bâton (2) (18th century)
- A Well at Rue du Creux Bâton (19th century)
- A Fortified Chateau at Rue de l'Eglise (1681)
- A Farmhouse at RD 996 (18th century)
- A Manor House at Rue du Tertre (19th century)
- Houses and Farms (18th - 19th century)

There is a house in the commune that has 2 Weathervanes (18th century) that are registered as historical objects.

=== Religious heritage ===
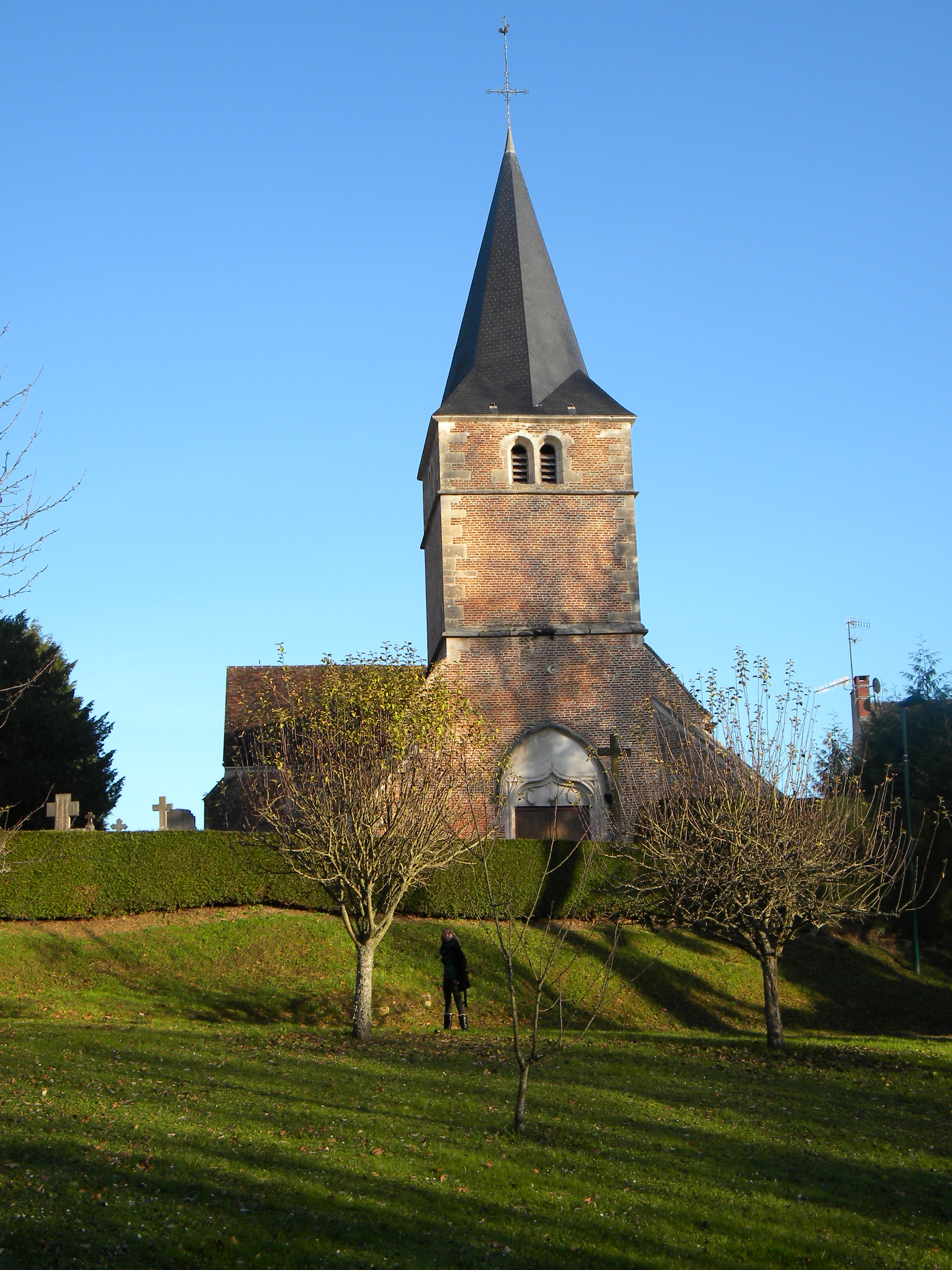
The Church of Sainte-Madeleine

The commune has several religious buildings and structures that are registered as historical monuments:

- A Presbytery at Rue de l'Eglise (19th century)
- The Parish Church of Sainte-Madeleine at Rue de l'Eglise (15th century) The Church has a very large number of items that are registered as historical objects.
- A Wayside Cross at RD 35a (1901)
- An Oratory at RD 996 (16th century)
- A Cemetery Cross (1844)

=== Environmental heritage ===
Because of its efforts for the quality of its nocturnal environment the commune was labeled a "2 star Village" in 2013. The label is awarded by the National Association for the Protection of the sky and night environment (ANPCEN ) and has 5 levels. A panel displayed at the entrances to the village shows this distinction.

== See also ==
- Communes of the Côte-d'Or department
