= Mellecey =

- Commune
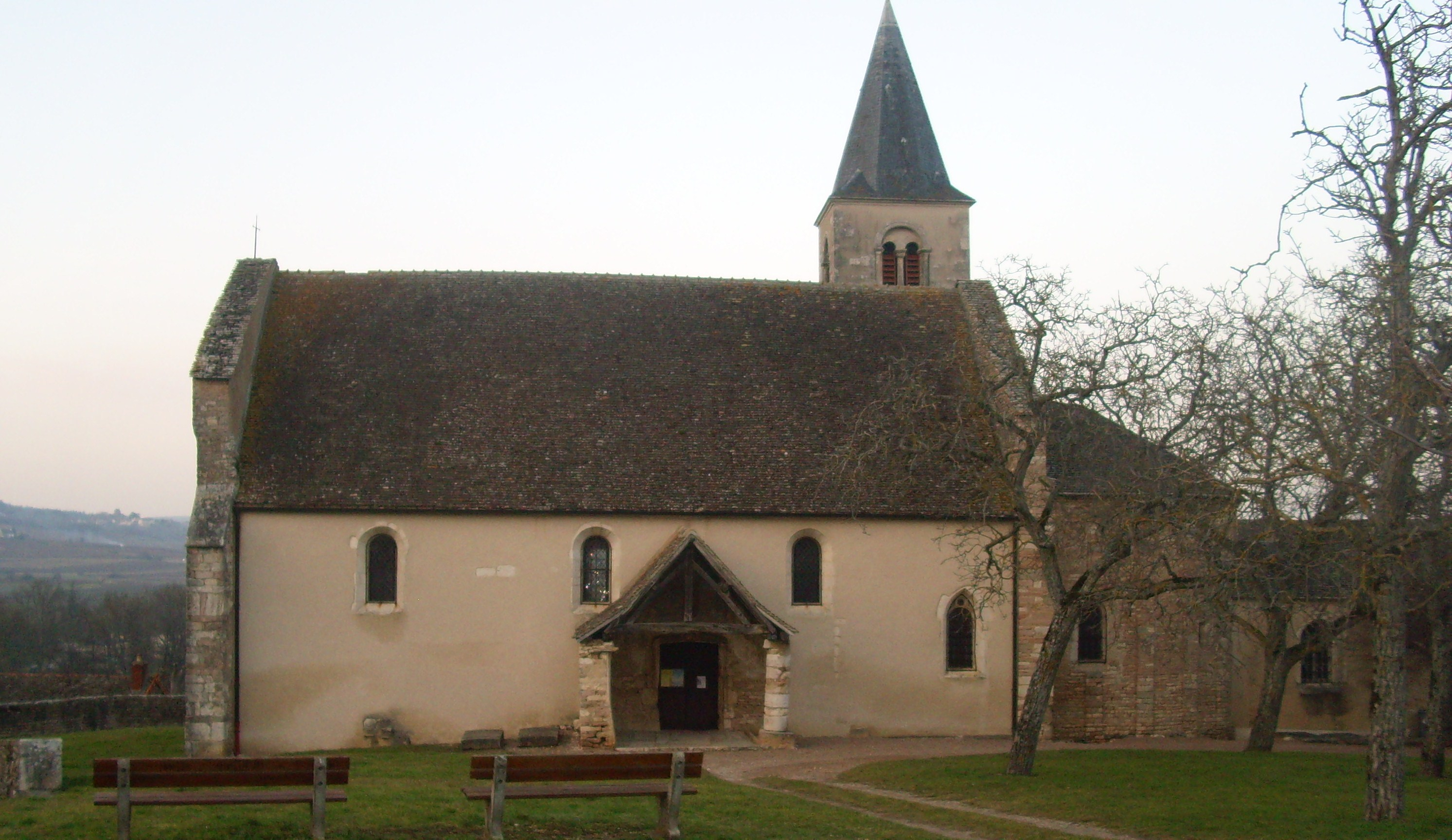
- The church in Mellecey

- Coat of arms
- Location of Mellecey
- Location within France Location within Bourgogne-Franche-Comté
- Coordinates: 46°48′41″N 4°43′45″E
- Country: France
- Region: Bourgogne-Franche-Comté
- Department: Saône-et-Loire
- Arrondissement: Chalon-sur-Saône
- Canton: Givry
- Intercommunality: CA Le Grand Chalon

Government
  - Mayor (2020–2026): Pierre Andriot
- Area^{1}: 14.23 km^{2} (5.49 sq mi)
- Elevation: 213 m (699 ft)
- Highest elevation: 371 m (1,217 ft)
- Lowest elevation: 189 m (620 ft)
- Population (2023): 1,348
  - Density: 94.73/km^{2} (245.3/sq mi)
- Time zone: UTC+01:00 (CET)
  - Summer (DST): UTC+02:00 (CEST)
- INSEE/Postal code: 71292 /71640
- ^{1} French Land Register data, which excludes lakes, ponds, glaciers > 1 km^{2} (0.386 sq mi or 247 acres) and river estuaries.

Mellecey (French pronunciation: [mɛlsɛ]) is a commune in the Saône-et-Loire department in the region of Bourgogne-Franche-Comté in eastern France.

== Sight ==
- Château de Germolles

== See also ==
- Communes of the Saône-et-Loire department
