= Château de Germolles =

Château in Burgundy, France

Coordinates: 46°48′21″N 4°45′5″E

- Mellecey
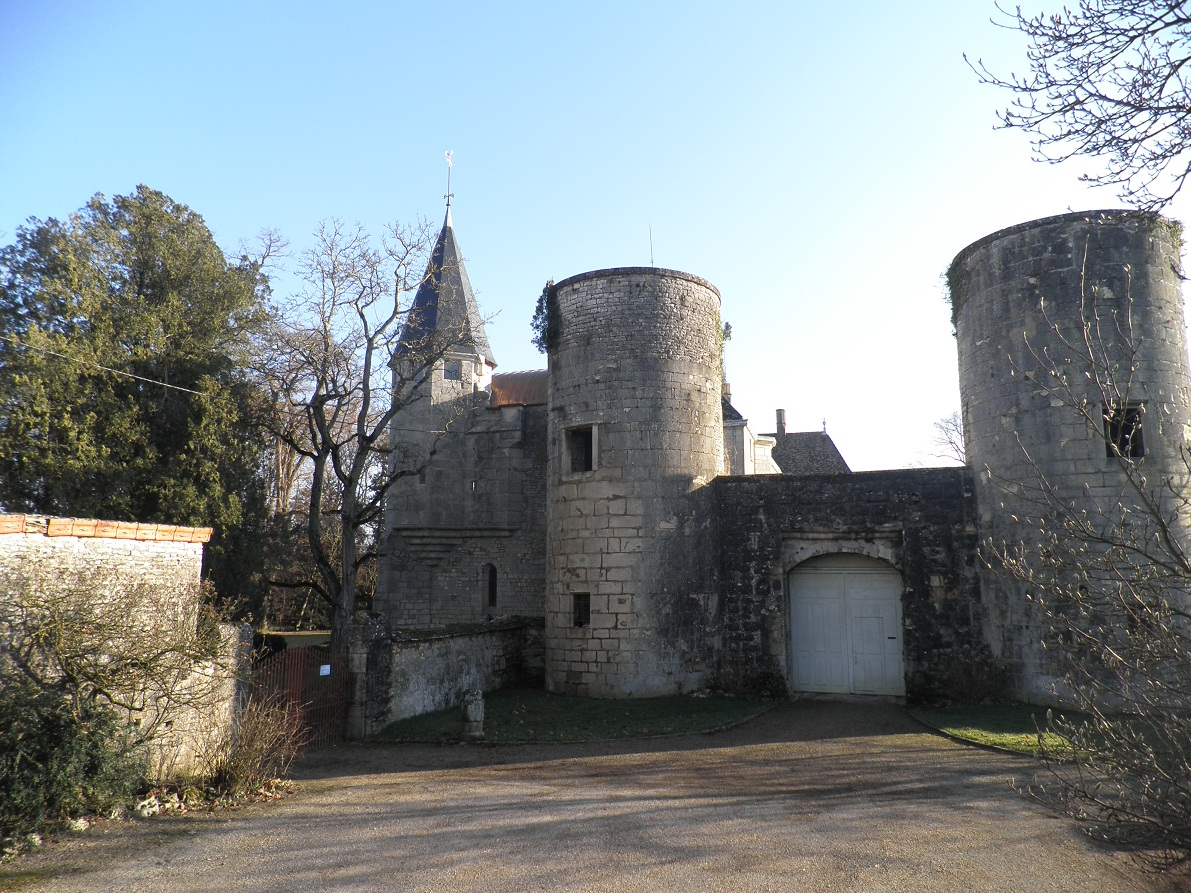
- The châtelet and the north-east bartizan from the lower court (13th–14th century)

Site information
- Type: Medieval palace

Site history
- Built: c. 1385–1400
- Built by: Margaret of Flanders

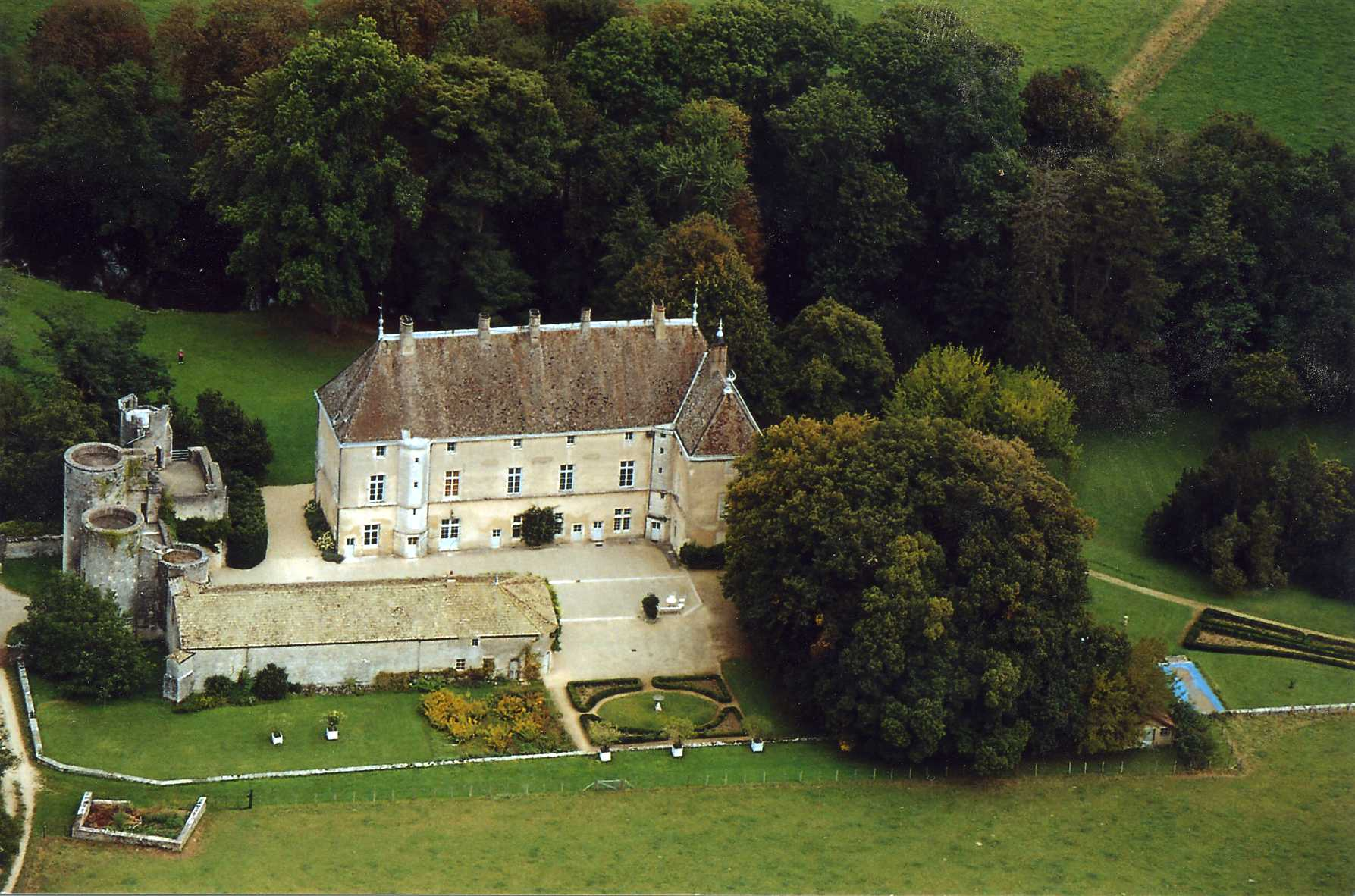
General view of the Château de Germolles

Château de Germolles is located in Burgundy—now part of Bourgogne-Franche-Comté—11 km west of Chalon-sur-Saône, 30 km south of Beaune, and 135 km north of Lyon. It is the only preserved residence of Philip the Bold, Duke of Burgundy, who later gifted the residence to his wife, Margaret III, Countess of Flanders. Built during the late 14th century, the site has been listed as a historical monument (monument historique) since 1989. The chateau is privately owned but can be visited on guided tours.

== History ==
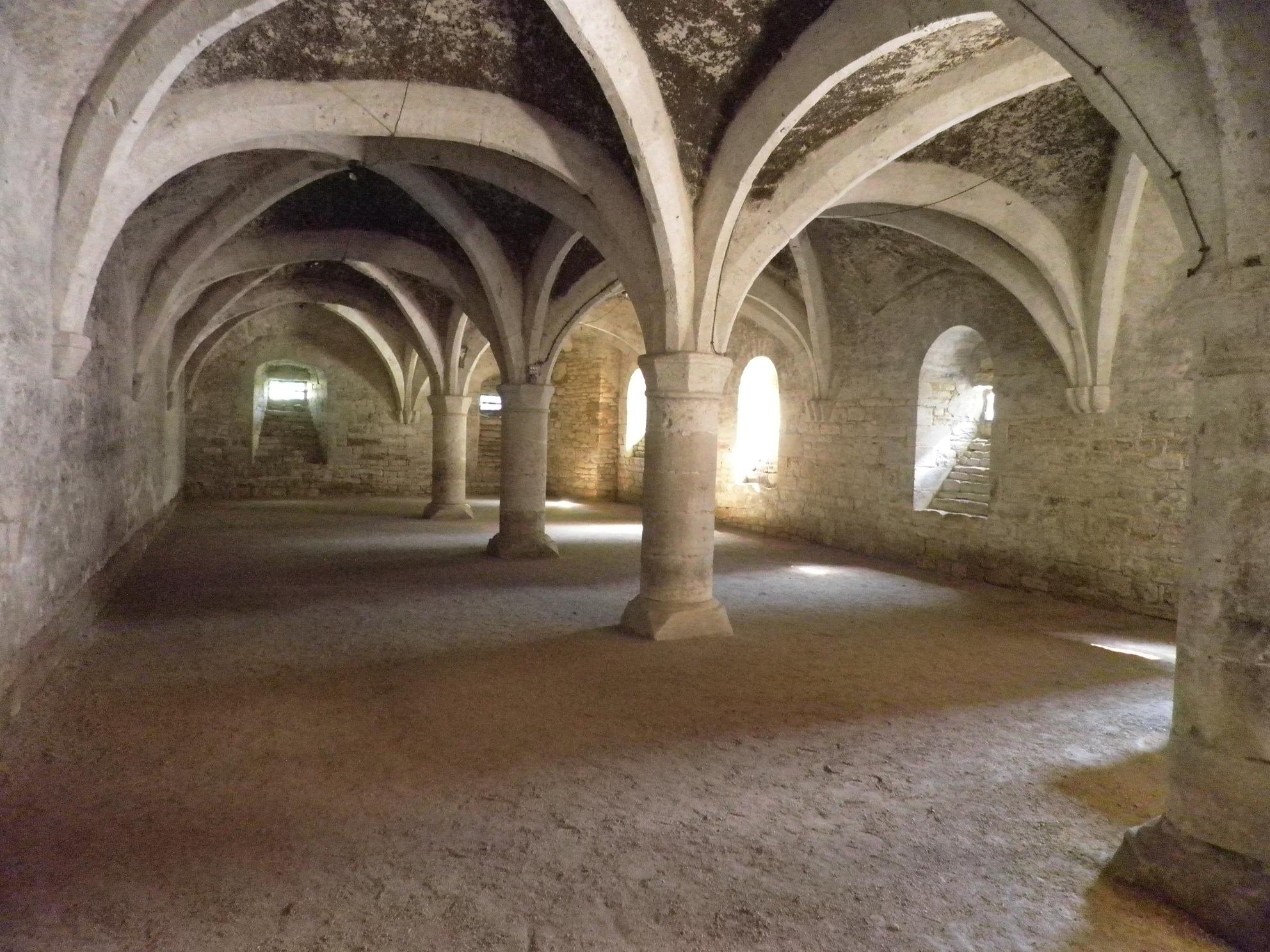
The cellar (13th century)

=== Origins: the stronghold of the seigneurs of Germolles ===
The site of Germolles was occupied from the 13th century by a stronghold built by the local feudal lords of the manor: the seigneurs of Germolles. In the 2nd half of the 14th century, their financial situation was so critical that they had to sell the domain of Germolles which was purchased by the Duke of Burgundy, Philip the Bold. We know very little about the appearance of the fortress of the lords of Germolles. It certainly had large towers and solid walls with only a few windows. All that remains of the original building are the lower chapel and the wine cellar.

=== Country estate of Philip the Bold and Margaret of Flanders ===
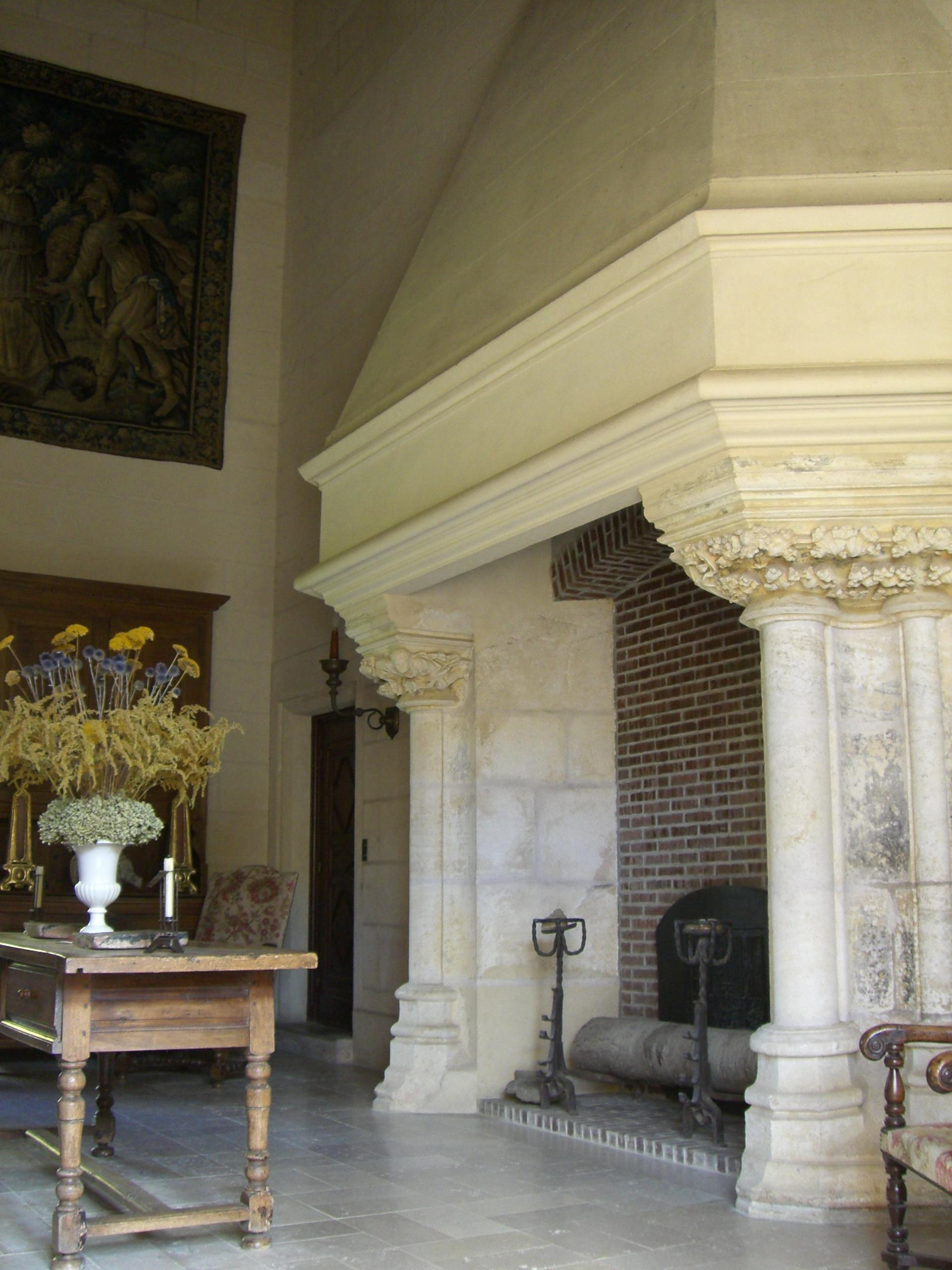
The fireplace of the reception room (14th century) moved in the 20th century to the great hall of the château

In 1380, Philip the Bold (first Duke of Burgundy of the new royal Valois dynasty in France, after the Capetian dynasty came to an end) purchased the domain of Germolles. After one year, he gave it to his wife, the Duchess Margaret of Flanders. Important and expensive transformations were immediately undertaken by her. They lasted for the next ten years. The aim of the duchess was to transform the austere and archaic fortress of the 13th century into a country estate. In order to achieve this, she enlisted the help of artists working in the service of the ducal couple: the architect Drouet de Dammartin, the sculptors, Jean de Marville and Claus Sluter, and the painter Jean de Beaumetz. These artists worked at the same time on another important project of the Duke: the chartreuse de Champmol.

The residence was slowly transformed into a sumptuous country estate. The large rectangular building, surrounded by a moat, enclosed a courtyard. The apartments were situated in the south and east wings, while the west wing contained receptions rooms, and the north wing was for the guards and security staff. The Duchess of Burgundy, who was energetic and a country lover, decided to develop at Germolles some rustic activities that would create a pleasant environment around her favourite residence, as well as developing local agriculture and providing some income for the maintenance of the domain. So she planted a large rose garden, and the petals were sent to Flanders to be used to make rose water. Similarly, a model sheepfold was built that reflected not only the Duchess's interest in sheep, but also the important contribution of that animal, through its wool, to the fortune of Flanders, in Burgundy.

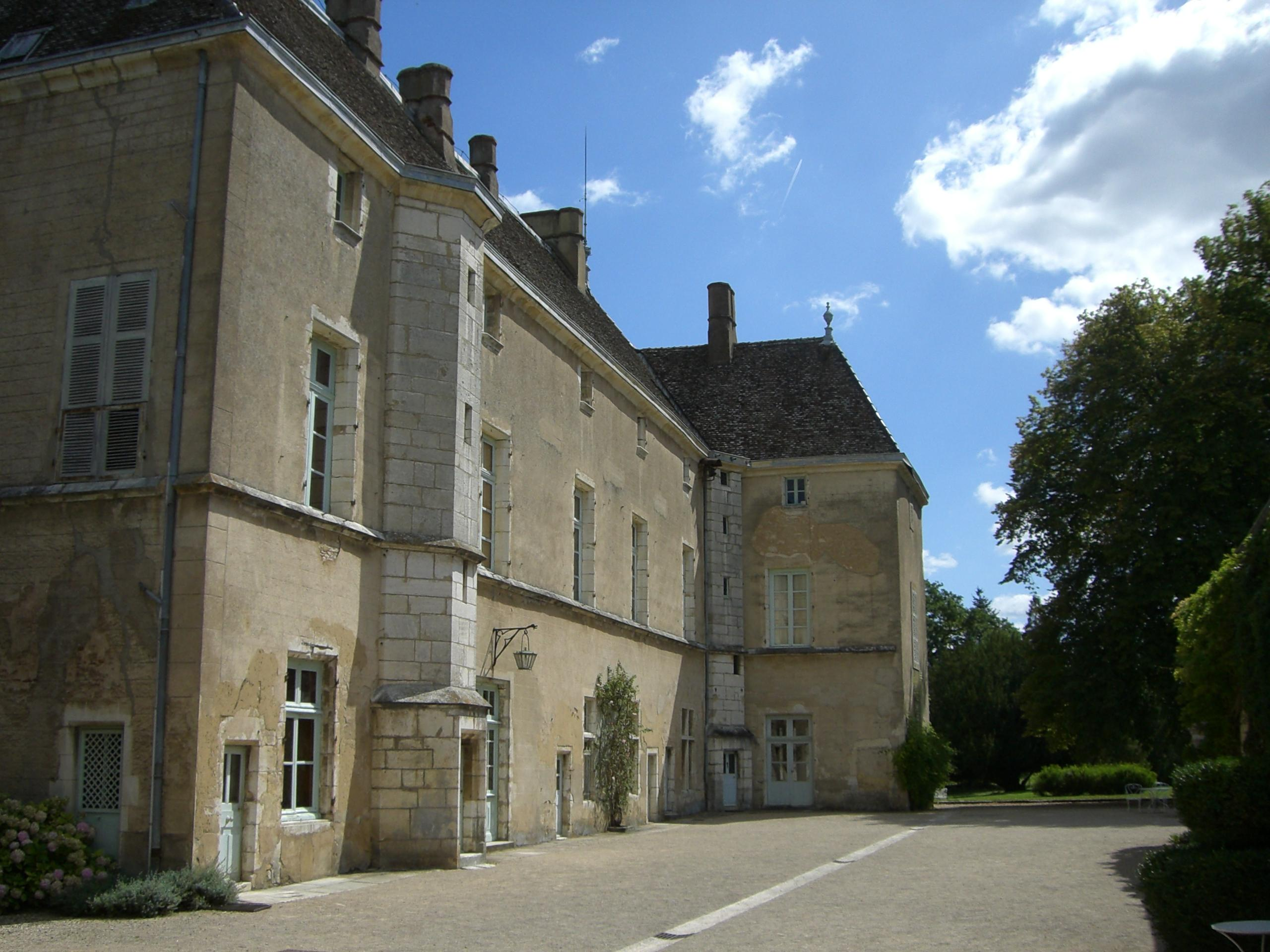
The main building from the north (14th century)

King Charles VI of France was received at Germolles on 12 February 1389, at the invitation of his aunt and uncle.

=== After the ducal period ===
After Philip the Bold and Margaret of Flanders, the château belonged to the following three Dukes of Burgundy : John the Fearless, Philip the Good and Charles the Bold. After the death of Charles the Bold in Nancy in 1477, the château became a possession of the King of France. Used by various families courtesy of the King until the end of the 18th century, the château was sold to the Nation after the French Revolution. Different kinds of destruction, voluntary or accidental, due in particular to the lack of maintenance, led to the loss of certain parts of the building. The château was purchased at the end of the 19th century by the same family who still own it. Today it is open to visitors throughout most of the year, and a programme of cultural events takes place annually.

== Description ==
=== Remains of the original fortress ===
Two elements date from the first period of Germolles (13th century). They are still conserved because they were integrated into the project of transformation in a ducal palace. The large wine cellar used for the storage of wine and food has conserved its medieval appearance with modern gothic next to traditional Burgundian romanesque elements. The lower chapel has similar architecture but has sculptured decoration with both romanesque reliefs and gothic foliage.

The two towers at the entrance to the château certainly date from the original building but were reused and reinforced in the 14th century. Even if during the ducal period the château was no longer a fortress, the importance of the rulers of the place required the presence of an escort confined to the châtelet comprising the towers and the guard room.

=== Sumptuous princely palace ===
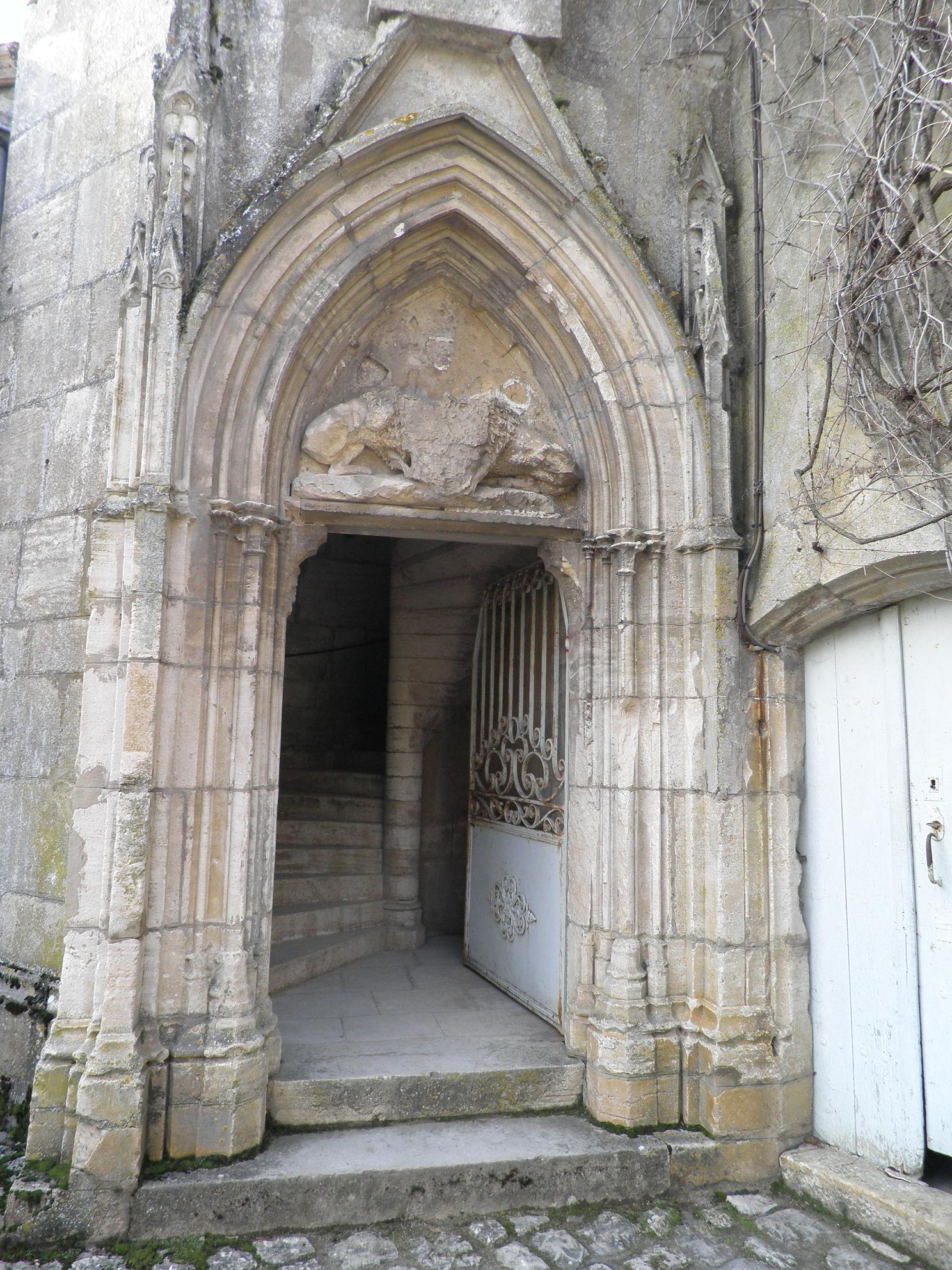
The entrance of the large spiral staircase (14th century)

The reception room above the cellar was used in the 14th century to receive important guests. It was destroyed by a fire at the beginning of the 19th century but the remains indicate its original size. The south wall of the room was decorated with a monumental fireplace on top of which was a gallery for the musicians. The remains of this fireplace were removed in the 20th century to the great hall of the present château. It is adorned with capitals from the workshop of Claus Sluter representing a scene of Chrétien de Troyes’s novel, Yvain, the Knight with the Lion. Today archaeological discoveries made in the château are displayed in the reception room. The château still has a large collection of medieval floor tiles that decorated the floors of the 1st and 2nd floors of the ducal residence. Made of enamelled terracotta, they are decorated with motifs such as daisies, lions that are the symbols of the rulers of the place as well as roses, thistles, sheep, suns, fleur-de-lis etc.

=== Ducal chapel ===
The duchess's architect created, above the old lower chapel, a ducal chapel. This is composed of a nave, as well as a choir (architecture) installed in the elegant octagonal turret built as a bartizan and a private and comfortable oratory with its own fireplace. It was reserved for the devotions of the princess. At the end of the 19th century a fire destroyed this exquisite part of the building which was then exposed to the elements. In 2009–2010, restoration work under the supervision and with the financial support of the government and the Department of Saône-et-Loire, was carried out to restore the roof and top part of the turret and recreate the sense of the space of the nave with a modern protection.

=== Main building and the luxurious comfort of the court of Burgundy ===
Today, the main building stands apart from the rest of the château that once enclosed the courtyard and is regarded as its most notable surviving element. It is particularly well preserved, with features that highlight the quality of its construction, including large exterior-facing windows, turrets with internal stone spiral staircases, and Gothic fireplaces.

The three floors reflect the organization of the ducal court: the ground floor was used for domestic functions, the first floor housed the ducal apartments, and the second floor was reserved for the court.

In one of the kitchens on the ground floor, the large gothic fireplace still in its original position evokes the activities of the place. Gothic Revival architecture wall paintings with rose motifs were revealed during recent restoration work carried out in at the beginning of the 20th century. On the first floor, the dressing room of Margaret of Bavaria (daughter in-law of the ducal couple and future duchess of Burgundy), still possesses its murals that have been recently restored. These paintings by Jean de Beaumetz and his assistant Armoult Picornet are very rare examples of princely wall paintings in France at the end of the Middle Ages. The motifs P and M, initials of the duke and the duchess, cover the walls, along with thistles, a noble flower with sharp prickles which is the emblem of Margaret of Flanders. This decoration which extended to the floor (with floor tiles showing thistles) can be found as well in the adjoining room. Cleaning has revealed wall paintings similar to those in the dressing room. Other wall paintings with roses and daisies have been discovered in other apartments on the first floor.

The garret or rooms under the timbers on the second floor were for the court that accompanied the ducal couple. The ceiling built as an inverted hull of a ship was panelled and the walls were decorated with tapestries. One of these rooms, restored at the beginning of the 20th century is covered with copies of wall paintings from originals of the first floor.

=== Gardens to accompany the ducal residence ===
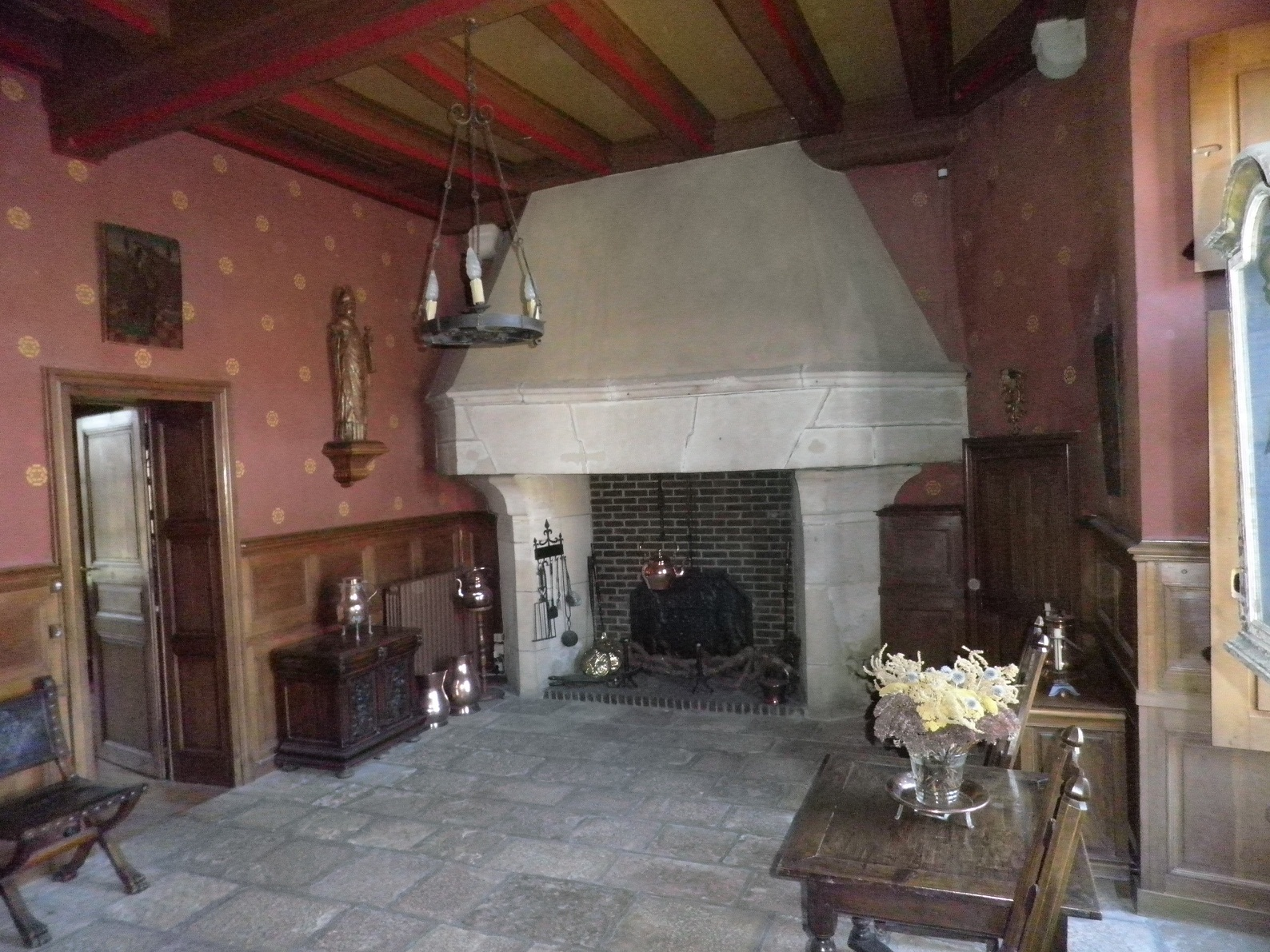
Medieval kitchen (14th century) transformed in a dining room (20th century)

The garden created by Margaret of Flanders and the large rose garden have disappeared. Transformed into a romantic English garden at the end of the 19th century, the park has some charming spots with old and rare trees such as a Bald Cypress, a Tulip tree from Virginia, a ginkgo biloba, an araucaria, and groups of lime trees.

== Some dates ==
- 1380: The duke of Burgundy, Philip the Bold, purchased Germolles for his wife, Margaret of Flanders;
- 1382: beginning of the renovation and re-building of the residence. The work lasted fifteen years during which the château was transformed into a luxurious country estate;
- 1389: visit of King Charles VI of France;
- 1393: Claus Sluter carved the famous group showing Philip and Margaret; the duke and duchess are seated under an elm, surrounded by sheep;
- 1399: a statue of the Virgin Mary was made by Sluter and his workshop and placed at the entrance to the château;
- 1466: restoration of the group made by Sluter, protected against the elements;
- 1873: fires destroyed parts of the château.

== Gallery ==
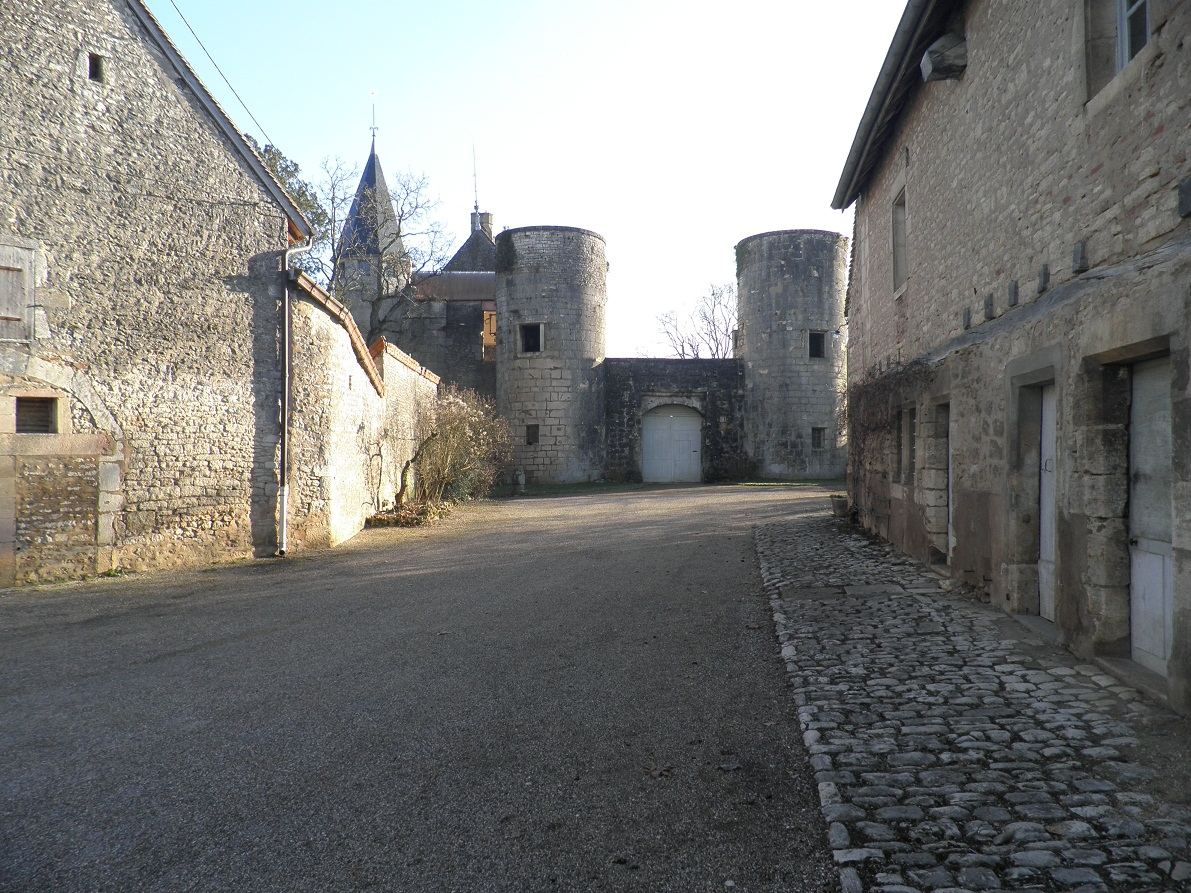
The lower court with the châtelet at the back

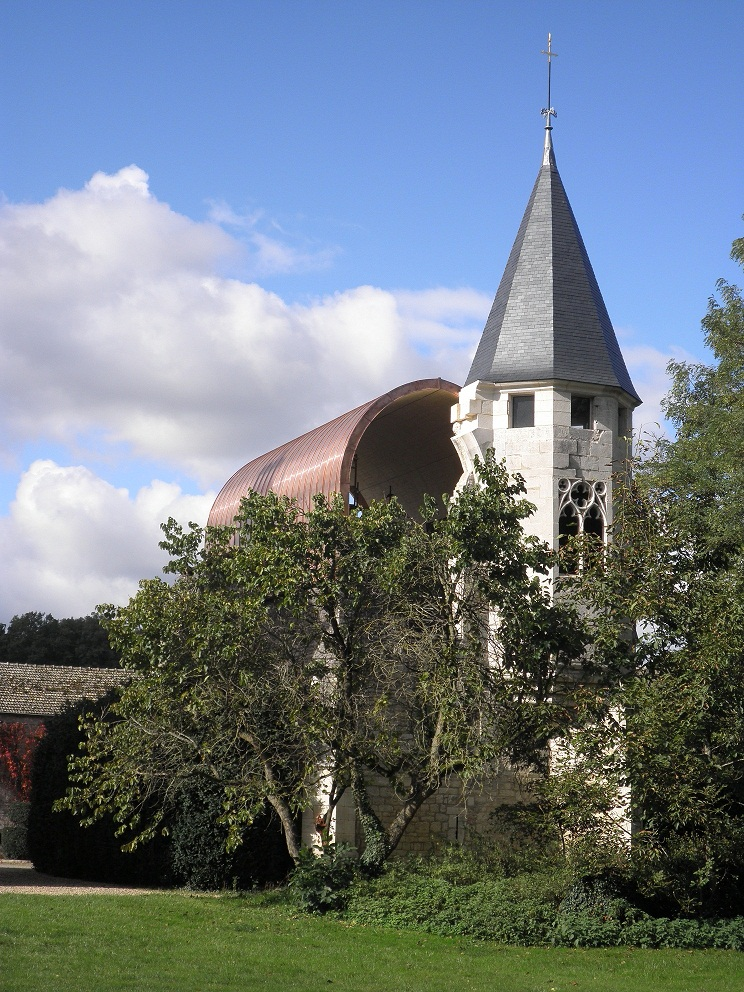
View of the ducal chapel after restoration (14th century)

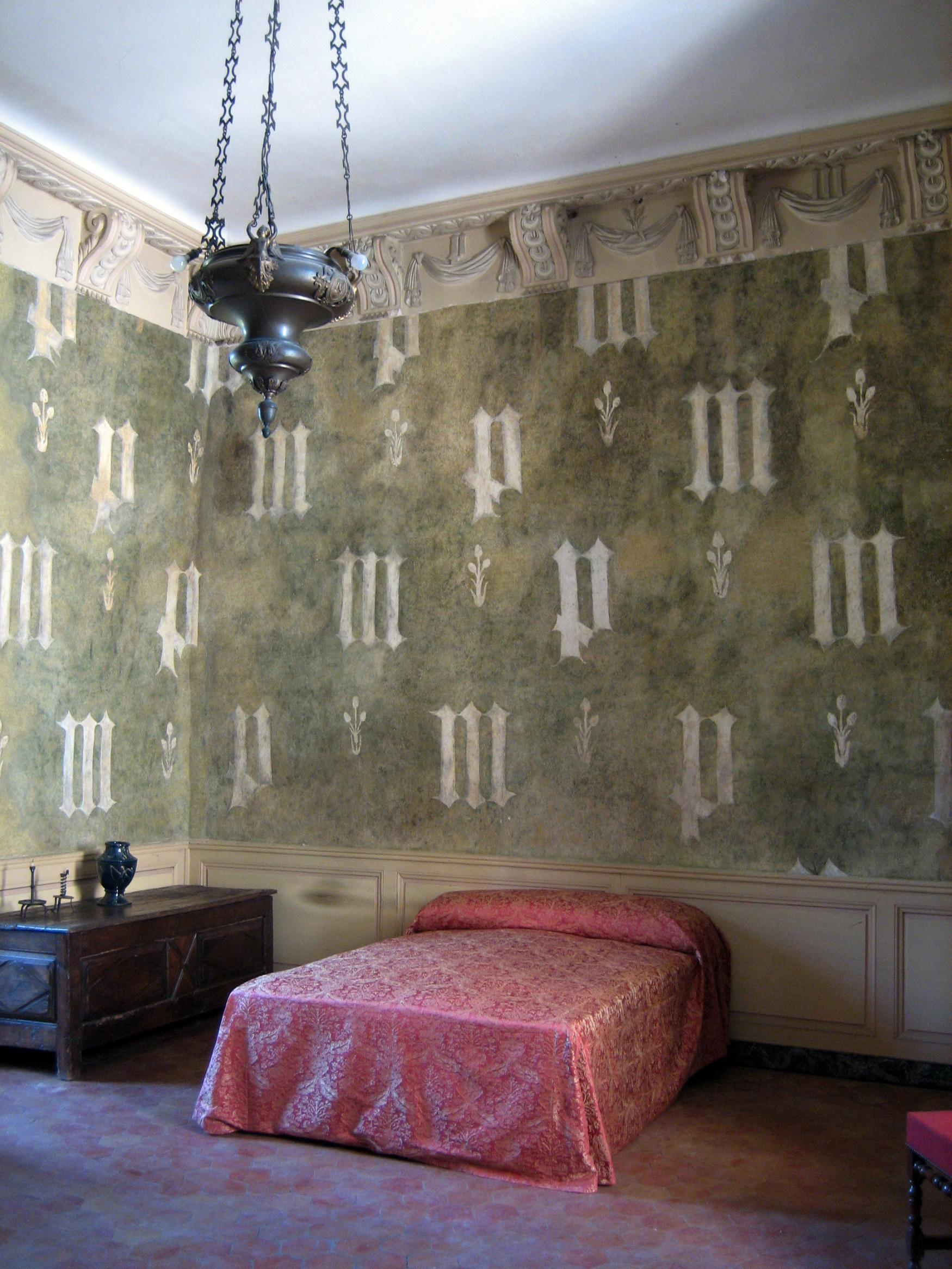
Mural painting of the dressing room of Margaret of Bavaria (14th century)

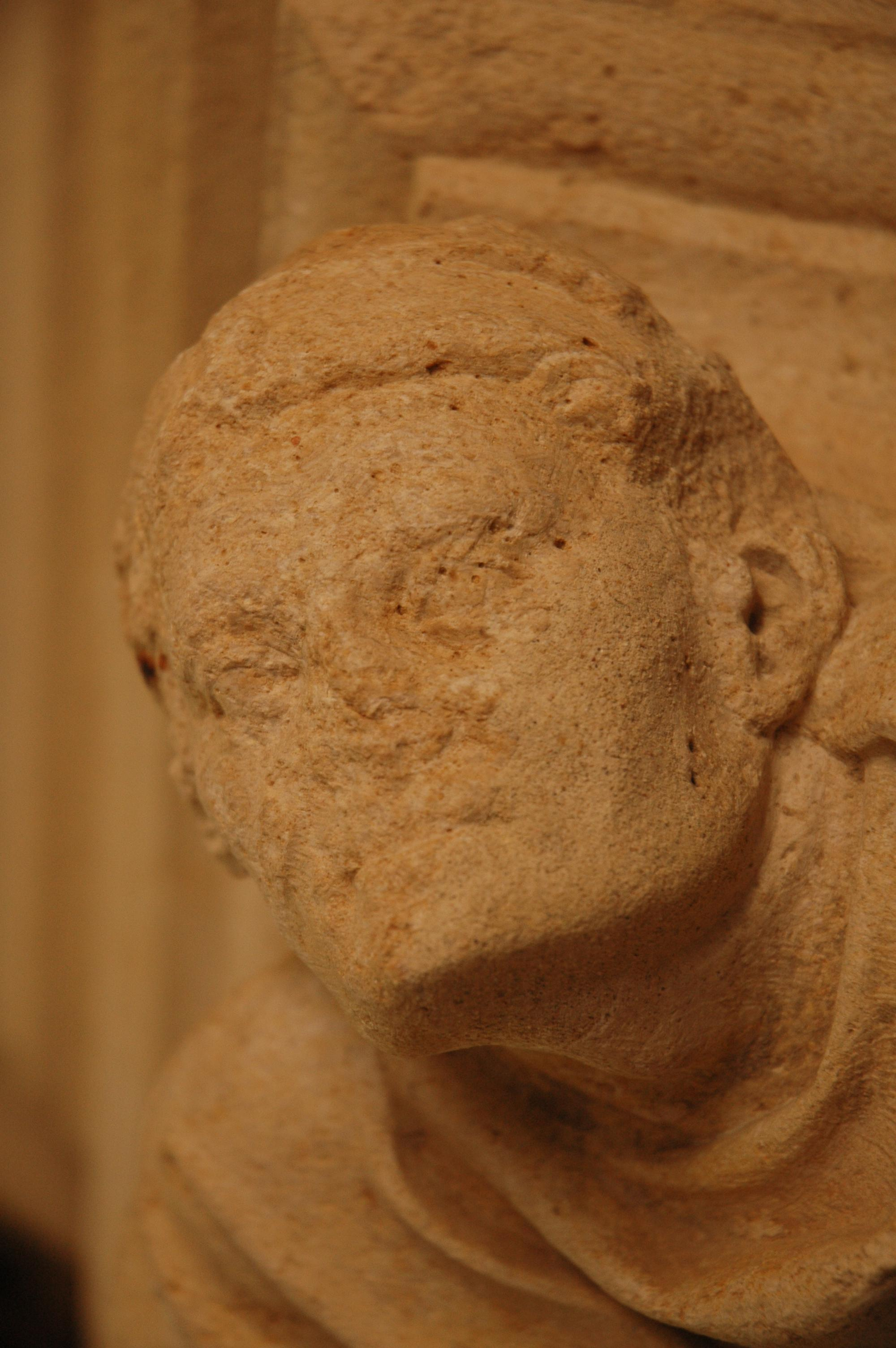
Detail of a capital of the fireplace of the reception room (14th century)

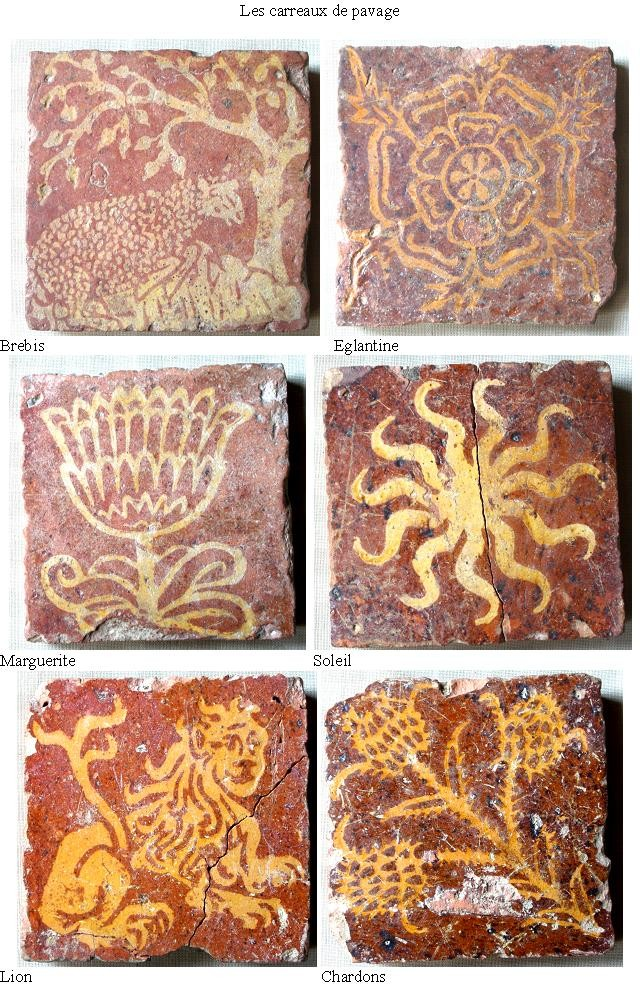
Floor tiles (14th century)

== Bibliography ==
- E. Picard, "Le château de Germolles et Marguerite de Flandre", Mémoires de la Société Eduenne, Autun, tome 40, 1912, p. 147–218
- H. Drouot, Autour de la pastorale de Claus Sluter, 1942
- J. Devignes, Le château de Germolles, demeure de plaisance ducale, 1972
- P. M. de Winter, "Jean de Marville, Claus Sluter et les statues de Philippe de Hardi et de Marguerite de Flandre au château de Germolles", Actes du 100ème congrès national des Sociétés Savantes (1976), Paris, 1978, p. 215–232
- P. Beck (coordinateur), Vie de cour en Bourgogne à la fin du Moyen Age, Saint-Cyr-sur-Loire, Editions Alan Sutton, 2002, 128p (monographie historique et archéologique sur le château de Germolles)
- Catalogue de l'exposition L'art à la cour de Bourgogne. Le mécénat de Philippe le Hardi et de Jean sans Peur (1364–1419), Dijon, Musée des Beaux-Arts, Cleveland, The Cleveland of Art, 2004–2005, p. 146–150
- C. Beck et P. Beck,"L'exploitation et la gestion des ressources naturelles dans le domaine ducal bourguignon à la fin du XIVe siècle", in Médiévales, automne 2007 : La nature en partage, n°53, 2007, p. 93–108
- M. Pinette, "Le château de Germolles", Congrés Archéologique de France, 166e session, 2008, Saône et Loire, publication Société Française d'Archéologie, Paris, 2010, p. 196–203
