= Argilly =

- Commune
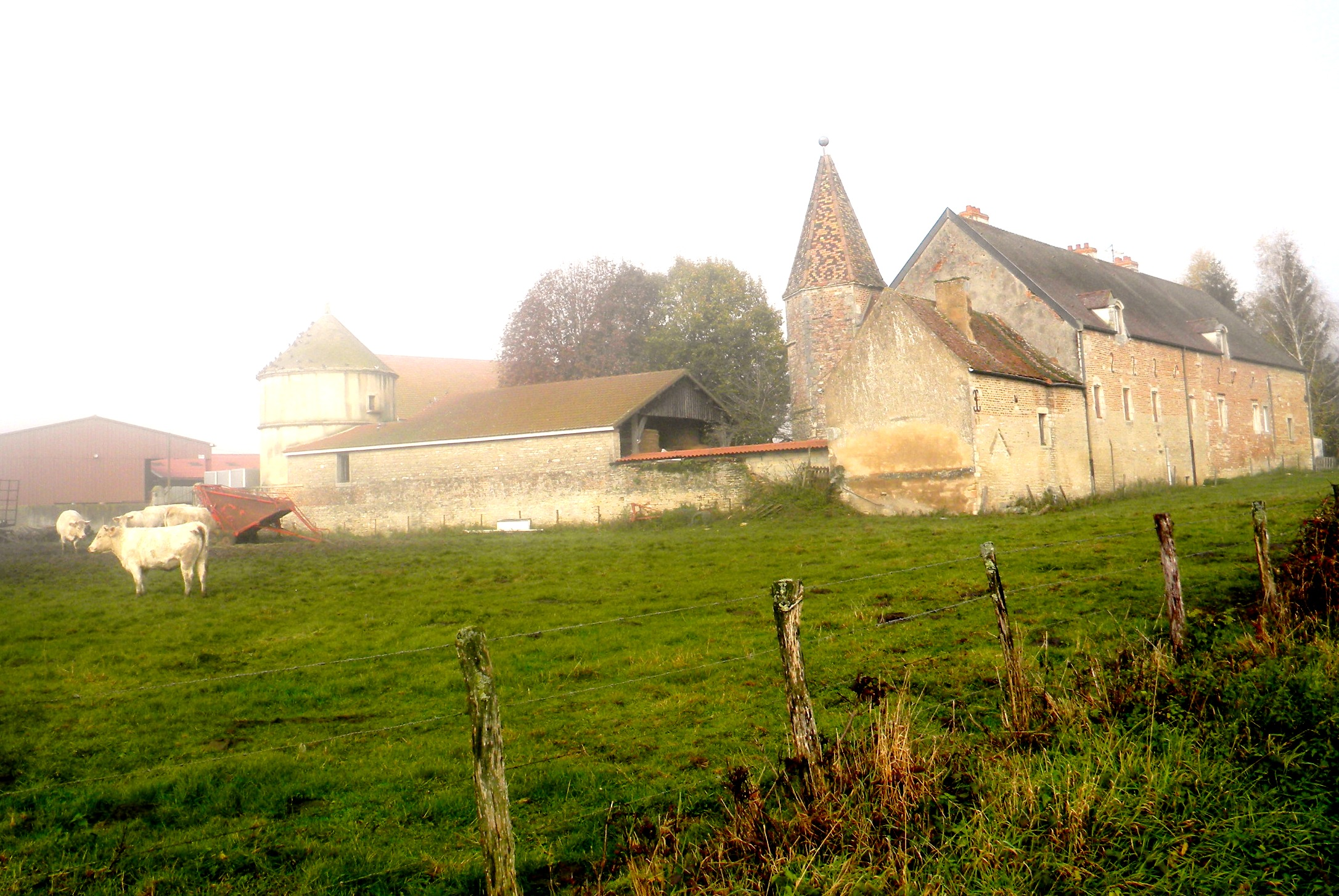
- Fortified farm at Argilly

- Coat of arms
- Location of Argilly
- Location within France Location within Bourgogne-Franche-Comté
- Coordinates: 47°04′09″N 5°00′46″E
- Country: France
- Region: Bourgogne-Franche-Comté
- Department: Côte-d'Or
- Arrondissement: Beaune
- Canton: Nuits-Saint-Georges
- Intercommunality: CC Gevrey-Chambertin Nuits-Saint-Georges

Government
  - Mayor (2020–2026): Antonio Cobos
- Area^{1}: 34.12 km^{2} (13.17 sq mi)
- Elevation: 224 m (735 ft)
- Highest elevation: 227 m (745 ft)
- Lowest elevation: 188 m (617 ft)
- Population (2023): 542
  - Density: 15.9/km^{2} (41.1/sq mi)
- Time zone: UTC+01:00 (CET)
  - Summer (DST): UTC+02:00 (CEST)
- INSEE/Postal code: 21022 /21700
- ^{1} French Land Register data, which excludes lakes, ponds, glaciers > 1 km^{2} (0.386 sq mi or 247 acres) and river estuaries.

Argilly is a commune in the Côte-d'Or department in the Bourgogne-Franche-Comté region of eastern France.

== Geography ==
Argilly is located some 8 km south-east of Nuits-Saint-Georges and 12 km north-east of Beaune. Access to the commune is by the D35 road from Gerland to the north passing through the commune north of the village and continuing to Bagnot in the east. Access to the village is by the D20 which branches off the D35 in the commune and passes south-west through the village and continues to Beaune. The A36 autoroute passes through the south of the commune but there is no exit in or near the commune. The commune is heavily forested in the north-east, east, and south with more forest in the north-west. The rest of the commune is farmland.

There is the Étang de Longbroche reservoir south-east of the village with streams flowing into it and the Meuzin stream flows south west of the village.

== History ==
The Castle of the Dukes of Burgundy was destroyed in 1590. There was also a tile factory which belonged to the Dukes.

=== Heraldry ===
Arms of Argilly	Blazon: Made of Gold, with two stakes of Sand.

== Administration ==
List of Successive Mayors

From	To	Name
2001	2026	Antonio Cobos

== Demography ==
The inhabitants of the commune are known as Argilliens or Argilliennes in French.

Historical population

Year	Pop.	±% p.a.
1793	832	—
1821	824	−0.03%
1846	909	+0.39%
1872	734	−0.82%
1901	586	−0.77%
1926	381	−1.71%
1946	370	−0.15%
1962	302	−1.26%
1968	265	−2.15%

Year	Pop.	±% p.a.
1975	266	+0.05%
1982	333	+3.26%
1990	420	+2.94%
1999	423	+0.08%
2007	443	+0.58%
2012	459	+0.71%
2017	513	+2.25%
2023	542	+0.92%

Source: EHESS and INSEE

== Sites and Monuments ==
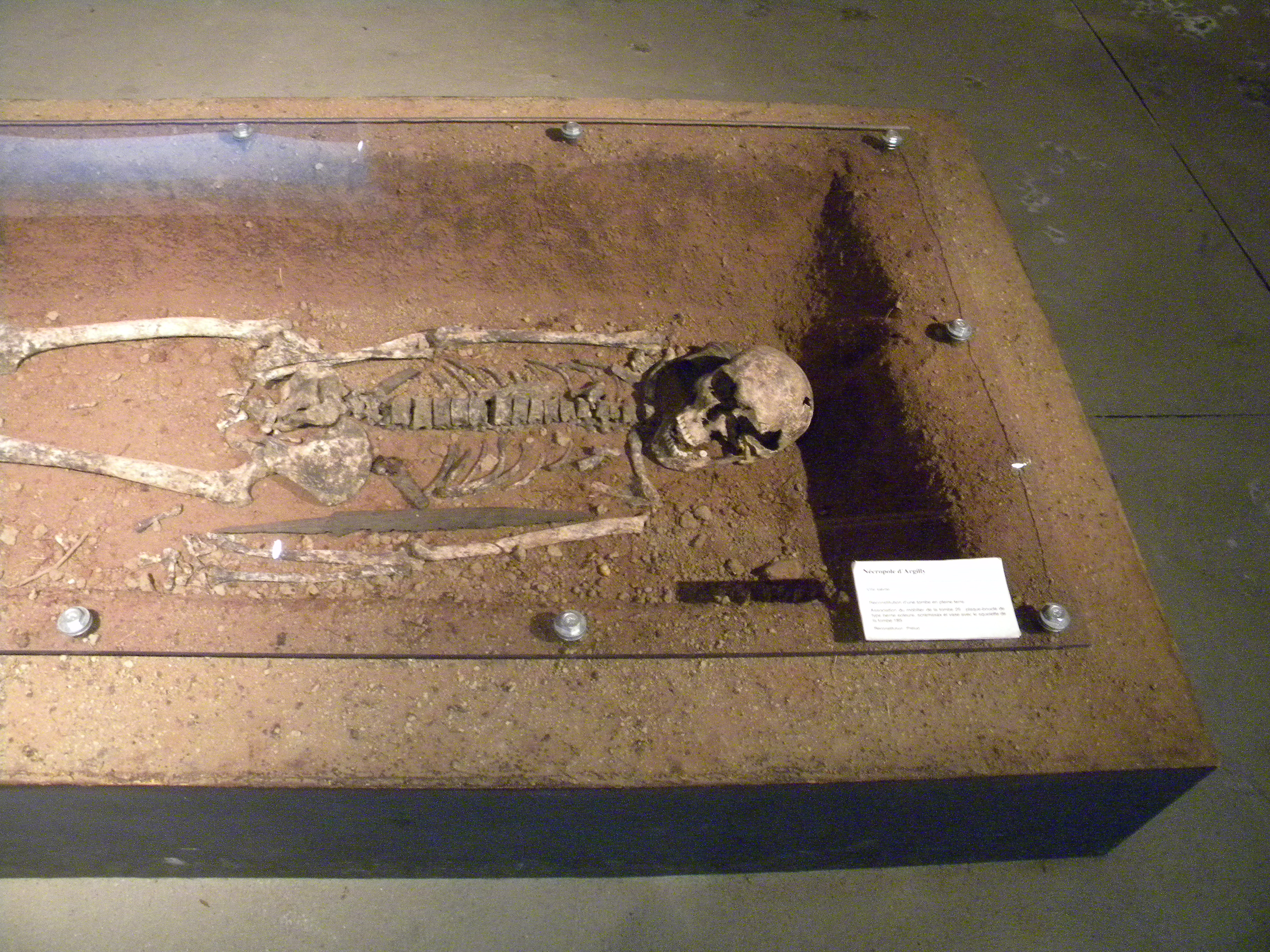
The Merovingian tomb

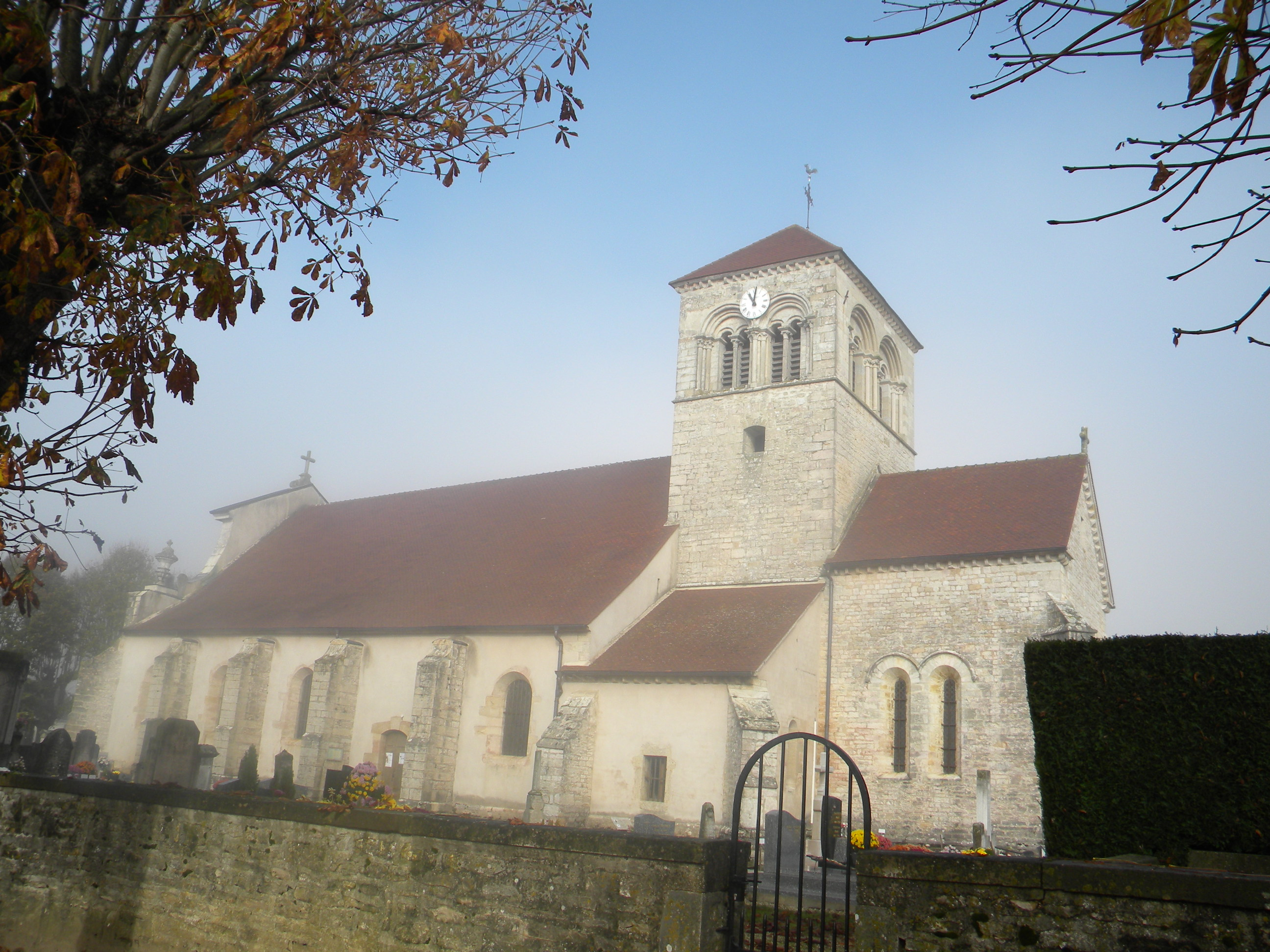
The Church of the Assumption

- A Merovingian villa and a large necropolis detected by aerial photography (objects at the Rodier Museum at Nuits-Saint-Georges).
- A Motte and Bailey castle of the Dukes.
- A fortified farmhouse from the 16th century with remains of the old castle: turret, hexagonal spiral staircase, bay windows with curly brackets, huge fireplaces, French ceilings.
- A Feudal mound and turrets from the fortified Chateau of Antilly.
- A Lavoir (Public Laundry) (1875) is registered as an historical monument.
- The Parish Church of the Assumption (13th century) is registered as an historical monument. It was rebuilt in the 18th century: the choir and transept are from the 13th century; the belfry the nave, and the monumental façade are from the 18th century. The church contains the following items registered as historical objects:
  - A Pulpit (18th century)
  - Bust/Reliquary of Saint-Reine (18th century)
  - Bust/Reliquary of Saint-Robert (18th century)
  - 2 candlesticks (18th century) from Citeaux Abbey
  - Set of 8 candlesticks and an altar cross (17th century)
  - A Statue: Virgin and Child (17th century)
  - A Statue: Saint Peter (15th century) by Claus Sluter.
  - A Tomb (13th century)

== Notable people linked to the commune ==
- Jean II Quarré, in 1416 received the fief of La Mothe d'Argilly from John the Fearless, Duke of Burgundy, who allowed him to take all the wood necessary for the construction of his house in La Mothe.
- Pierre Ranvial was Chatelain of the Chateau of Argilly in the year 1454. In the same year he was knighted.

== See also ==
- Communes of the Côte-d'Or department
