= Glanon =

- Commune
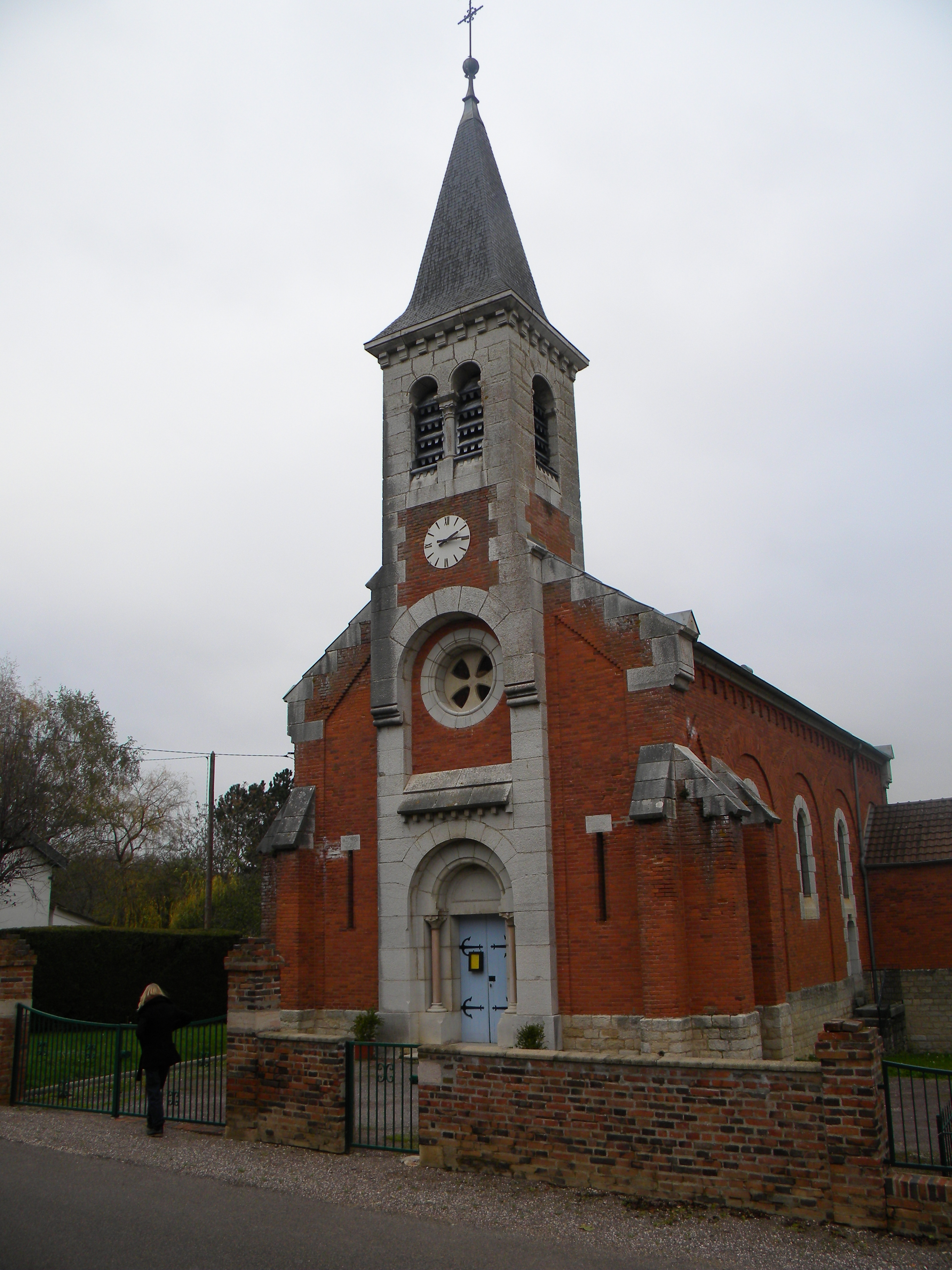
- The church in Glanon

- Coat of arms
- Location of Glanon
- Location within France Location within Bourgogne-Franche-Comté
- Coordinates: 47°02′27″N 5°06′26″E
- Country: France
- Region: Bourgogne-Franche-Comté
- Department: Côte-d'Or
- Arrondissement: Beaune
- Canton: Brazey-en-Plaine
- Intercommunality: Rives de Saône

Government
  - Mayor (2020–2026): Sébastien Belorgey
- Area^{1}: 3.65 km^{2} (1.41 sq mi)
- Elevation: 190 m (620 ft)
- Highest elevation: 208 m (682 ft)
- Lowest elevation: 176 m (577 ft)
- Population (2023): 272
  - Density: 74.5/km^{2} (193/sq mi)
- Time zone: UTC+01:00 (CET)
  - Summer (DST): UTC+02:00 (CEST)
- INSEE/Postal code: 21301 /21250
- ^{1} French Land Register data, which excludes lakes, ponds, glaciers > 1 km^{2} (0.386 sq mi or 247 acres) and river estuaries.

Glanon (French pronunciation: [ɡlanɔ̃]) is a commune in the Côte-d'Or department in eastern France.

== Population ==
Historical population
Year	Pop.	±% p.a.
1968	113	—
1975	106	−0.91%
1982	105	−0.14%
1990	143	+3.94%
1999	180	+2.59%
2007	204	+1.58%
2012	229	+2.34%
2017	248	+1.61%
2023	272	+1.55%
Source: INSEE

== See also ==
- Communes of the Côte-d'Or department
