= Technoport =

Technoport may refer to:

- Technoport Fukui Stadium in Fukui, Japan
- The "Technoport" power station in Pagny-le-Château, France
- Technoport, the technology business incubator in Belval, Luxembourg
