= Pagny-le-Château =

- Commune
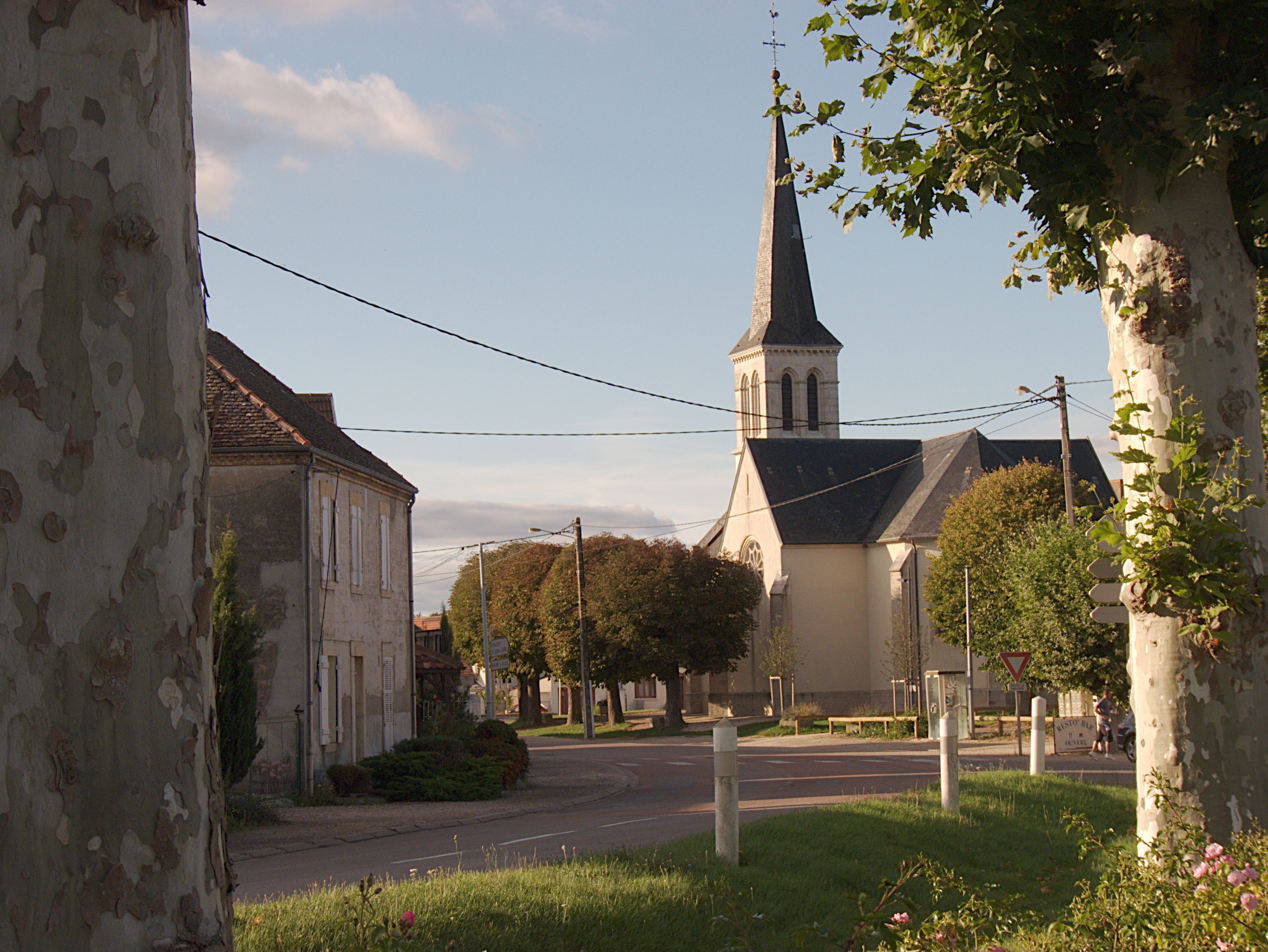
- The church in Pagny-le-Château

- Coat of arms
- Location of Pagny-le-Château
- Location within France Location within Bourgogne-Franche-Comté
- Coordinates: 47°02′54″N 5°11′41″E
- Country: France
- Region: Bourgogne-Franche-Comté
- Department: Côte-d'Or
- Arrondissement: Beaune
- Canton: Brazey-en-Plaine
- Intercommunality: Rives de Saône

Government
  - Mayor (2022–2026): Alain Becquart
- Area^{1}: 24.23 km^{2} (9.36 sq mi)
- Elevation: 183 m (600 ft)
- Highest elevation: 193 m (633 ft)
- Lowest elevation: 177 m (581 ft)
- Population (2023): 477
  - Density: 19.7/km^{2} (51.0/sq mi)
- Time zone: UTC+01:00 (CET)
  - Summer (DST): UTC+02:00 (CEST)
- INSEE/Postal code: 21475 /21250
- ^{1} French Land Register data, which excludes lakes, ponds, glaciers > 1 km^{2} (0.386 sq mi or 247 acres) and river estuaries.

Pagny-le-Château (French pronunciation: [paɲi l(ə) ʃɑto]) is a commune of the Côte-d'Or department in eastern France. The village is situated between Seurre and Saint-Jean-de-Losne, in the "Val de Saône" on the RD 976.

== History ==
Over the centuries, the village has had several names. The first one was Pancium. Afterwards, it was called Paygnay-le-Château, then Pagny-la-Brûlée. Even though the fortified castles were destroyed the village is now called Pagny-le-Château.

== Château ==
Although the château was destroyed in 1768, there remains its Renaissance chapel dated 1536. It contains the tomb of Jean de Vienne (died 1455) and that of Jean de Longwy (died 1460) and Jeanne de Vienne (died 1472), with alabaster effigies.

== Population ==
Historical population
Year	Pop.	±% p.a.
1968	428	—
1975	335	−3.44%
1982	343	+0.34%
1990	477	+4.21%
1999	491	+0.32%
2007	490	−0.03%
2012	493	+0.12%
2017	514	+0.84%
2023	477	−1.24%
Source: INSEE

The inhabitants are called Pagnitains in French.

== Administration ==
List of mayors
Term	Name	Party	Profession
1965 - 1971	Robert Marchand	-	Courier
1971 - 1989	Jacques Grenot	-	Farmer
1989 - 2020	Jacques Chossat de Montburon	UMP-LR	Retiree
2020 - 2022	Hubert Moindrot	-	Retiree
2022 -	Alain Becquart	-	

== See also ==
- Communes of the Côte-d'Or department

== Photos gallery ==
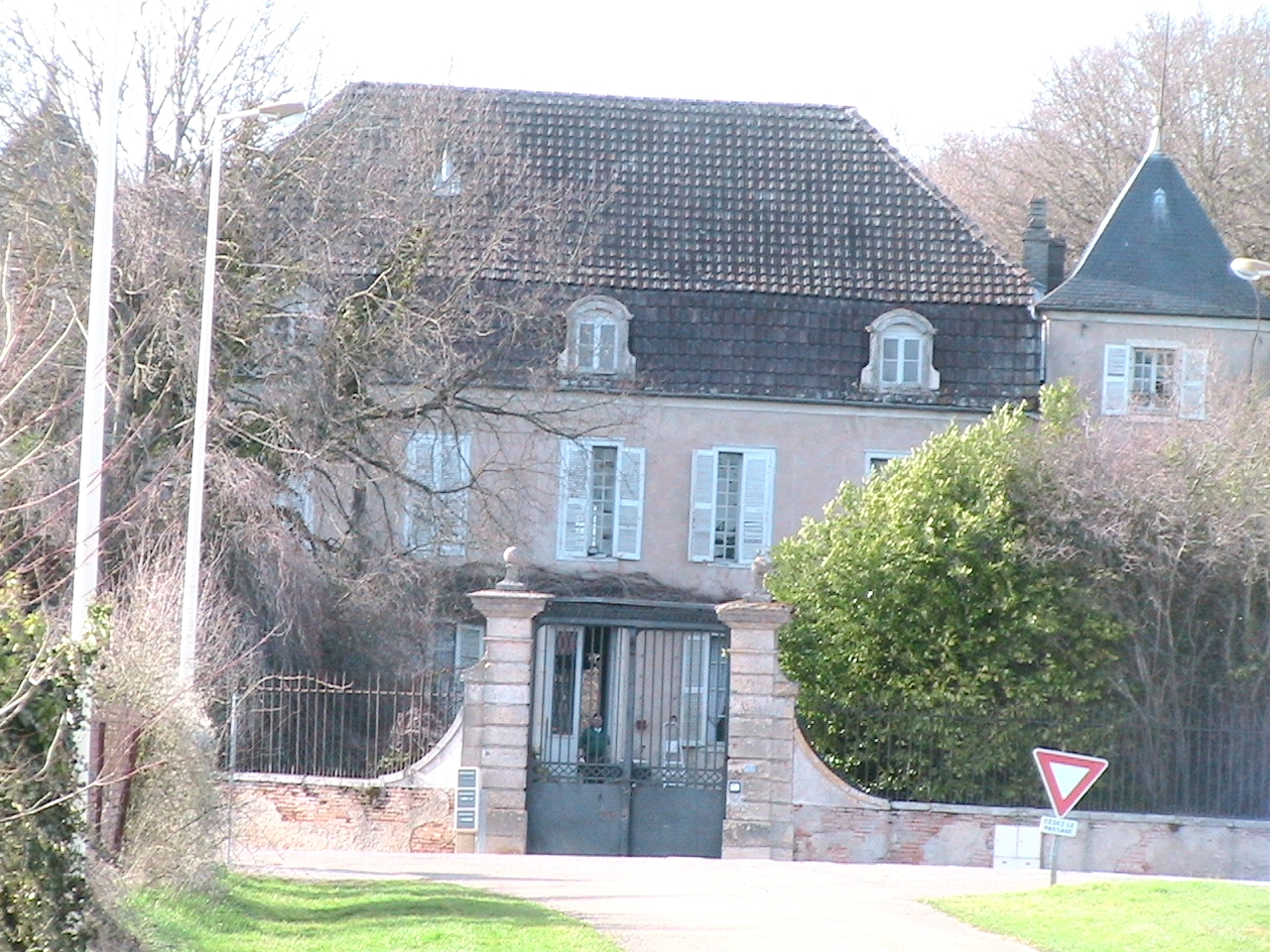
Pagny-le-Château : view of the castel.

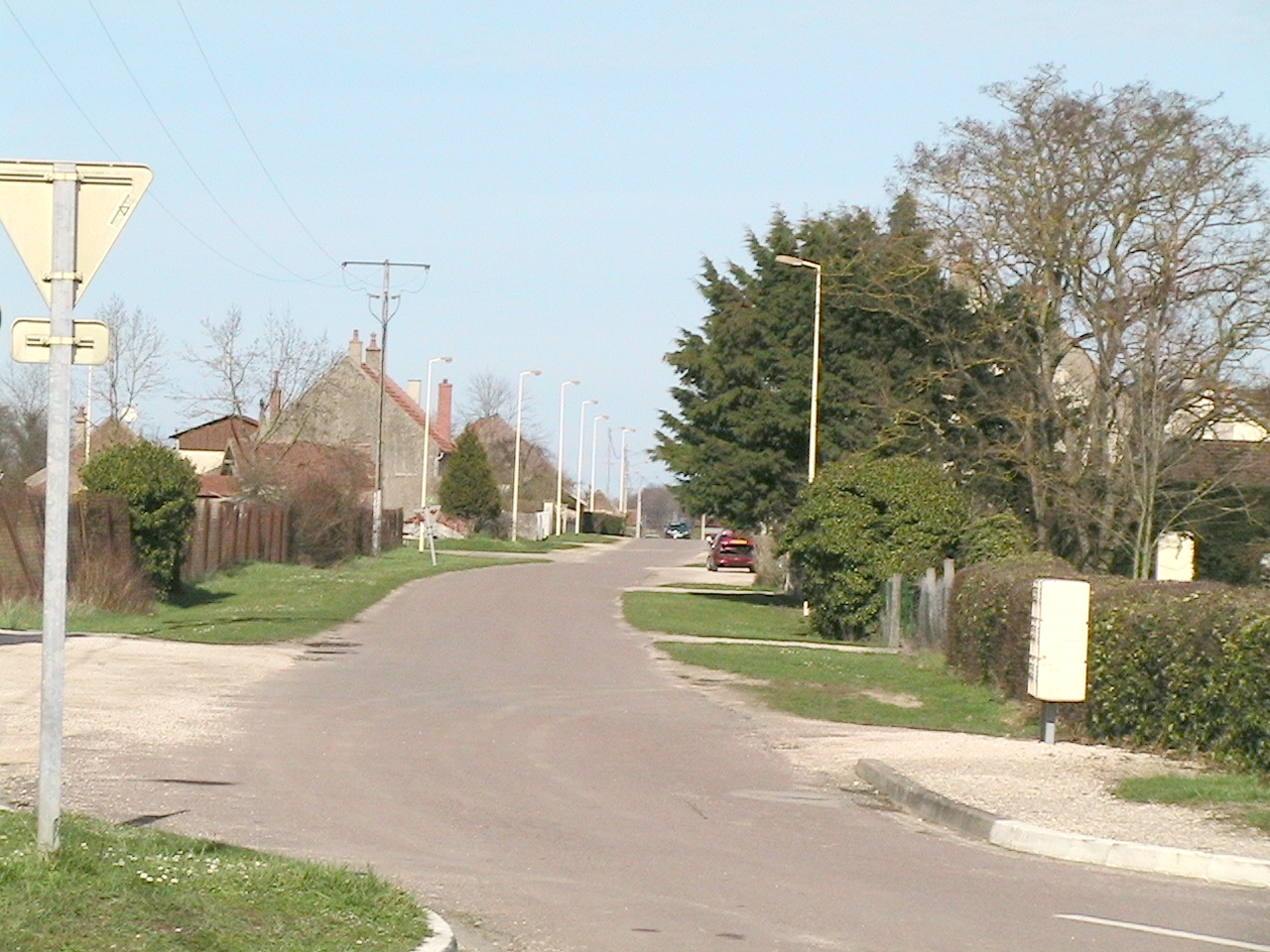
Pagny-le-Château : way to Franxault

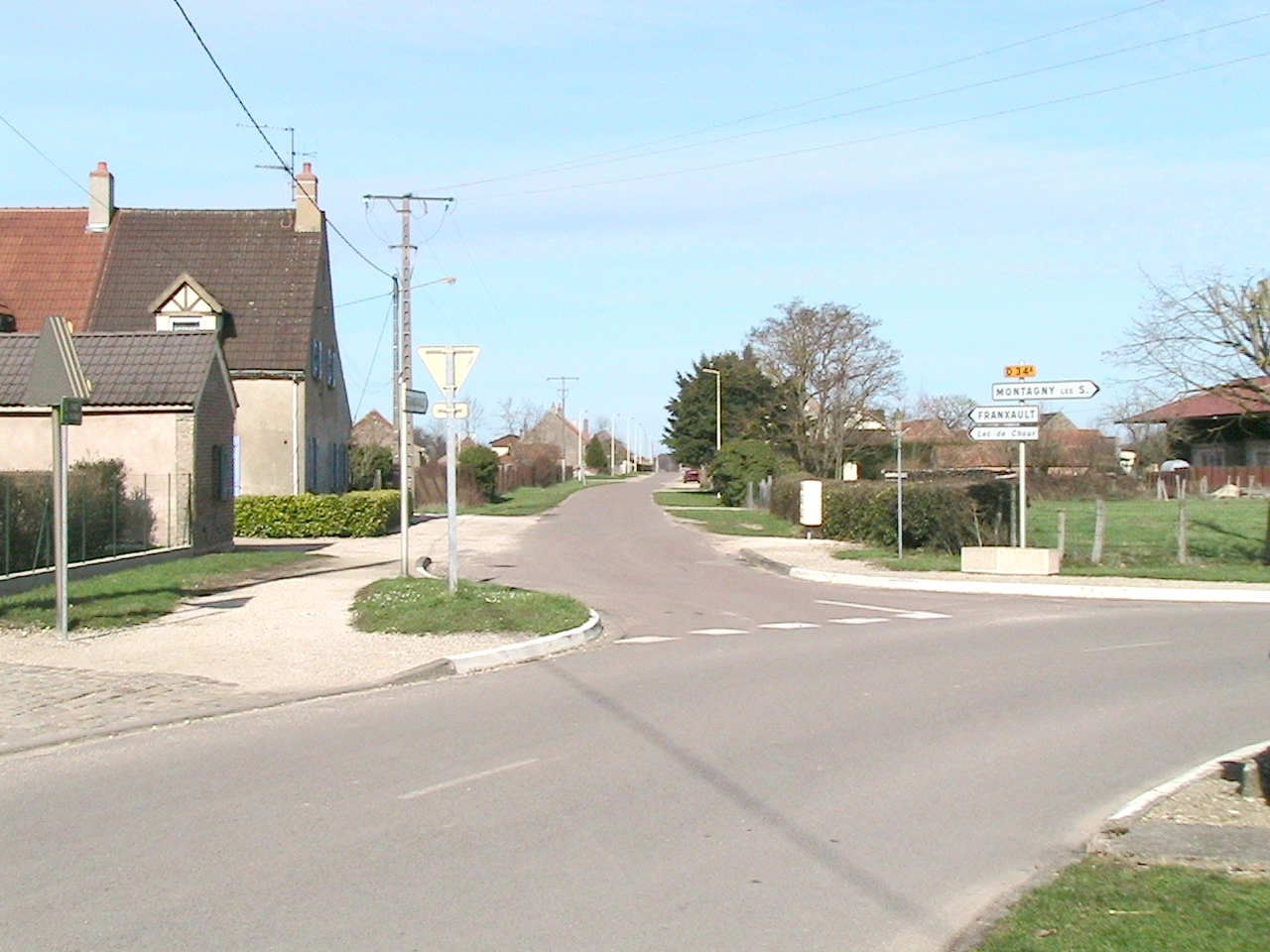
Pagny-le-Château : way to Franxault

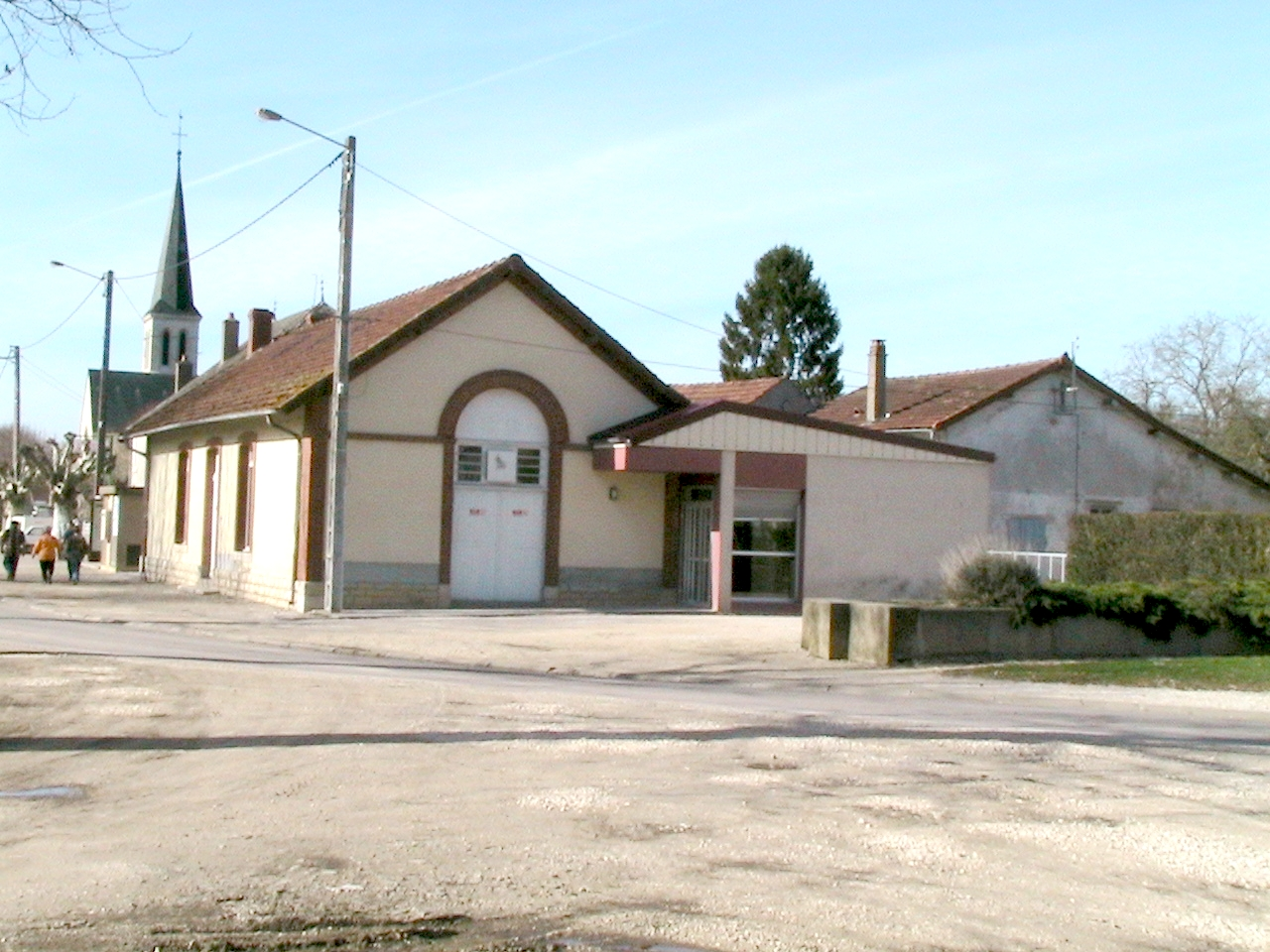
Pagny-le-Château : communal house

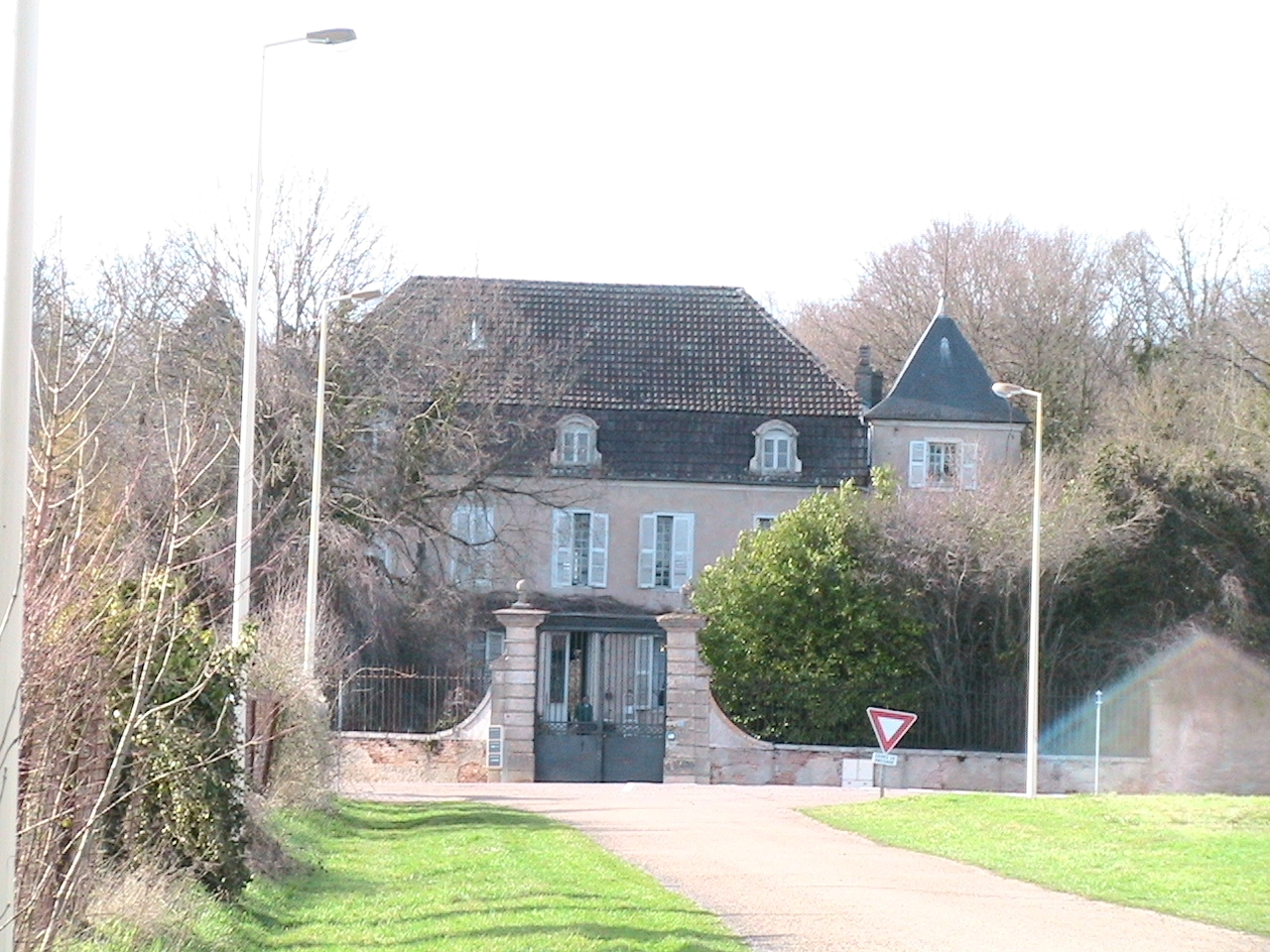
Pagny-le-Château : view of the castel

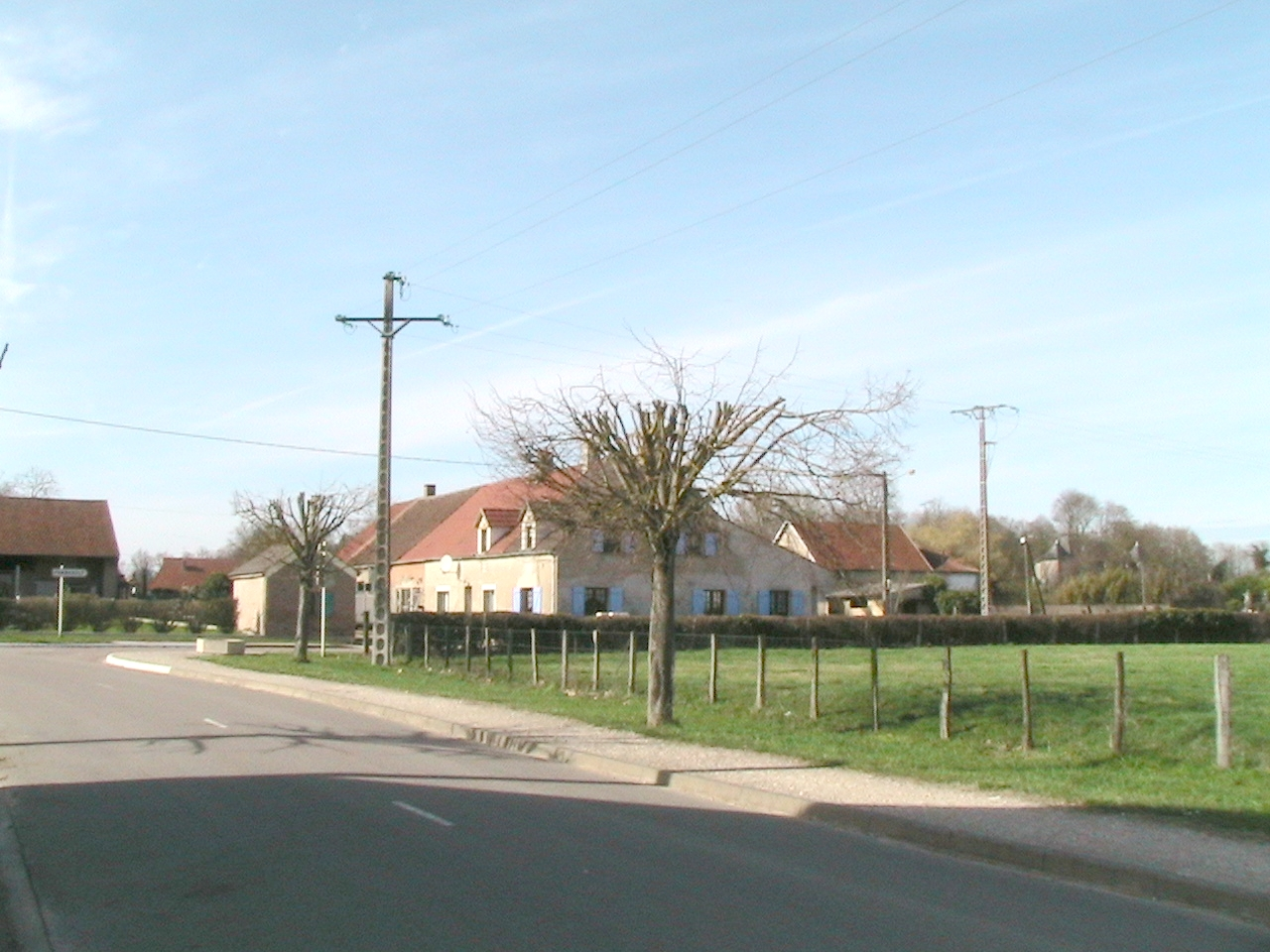
Pagny-le-Château : crossroad between the road to Franxault and the road to Montagny-lès-Seurre

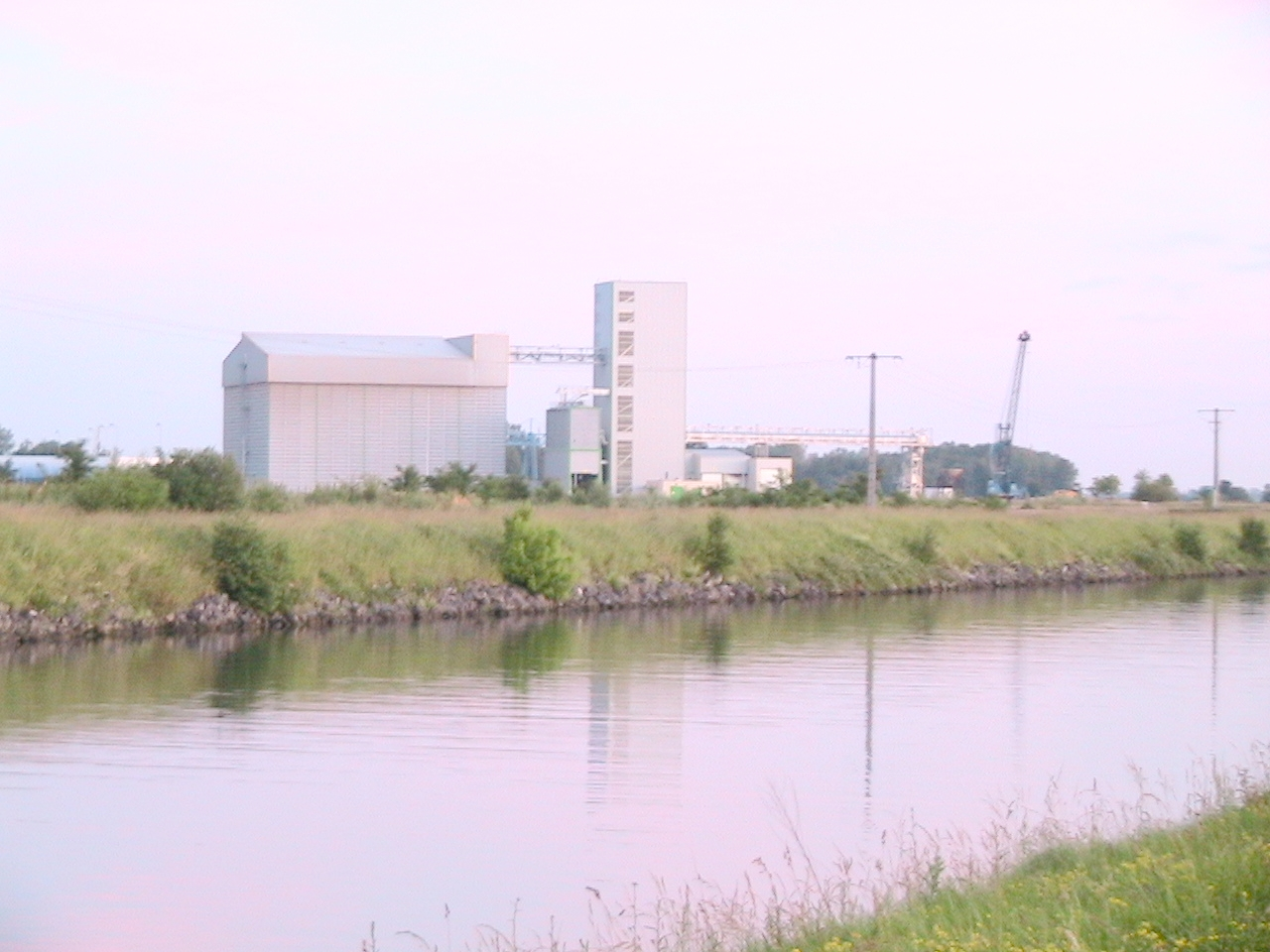
Pagny-le-Château : technoport

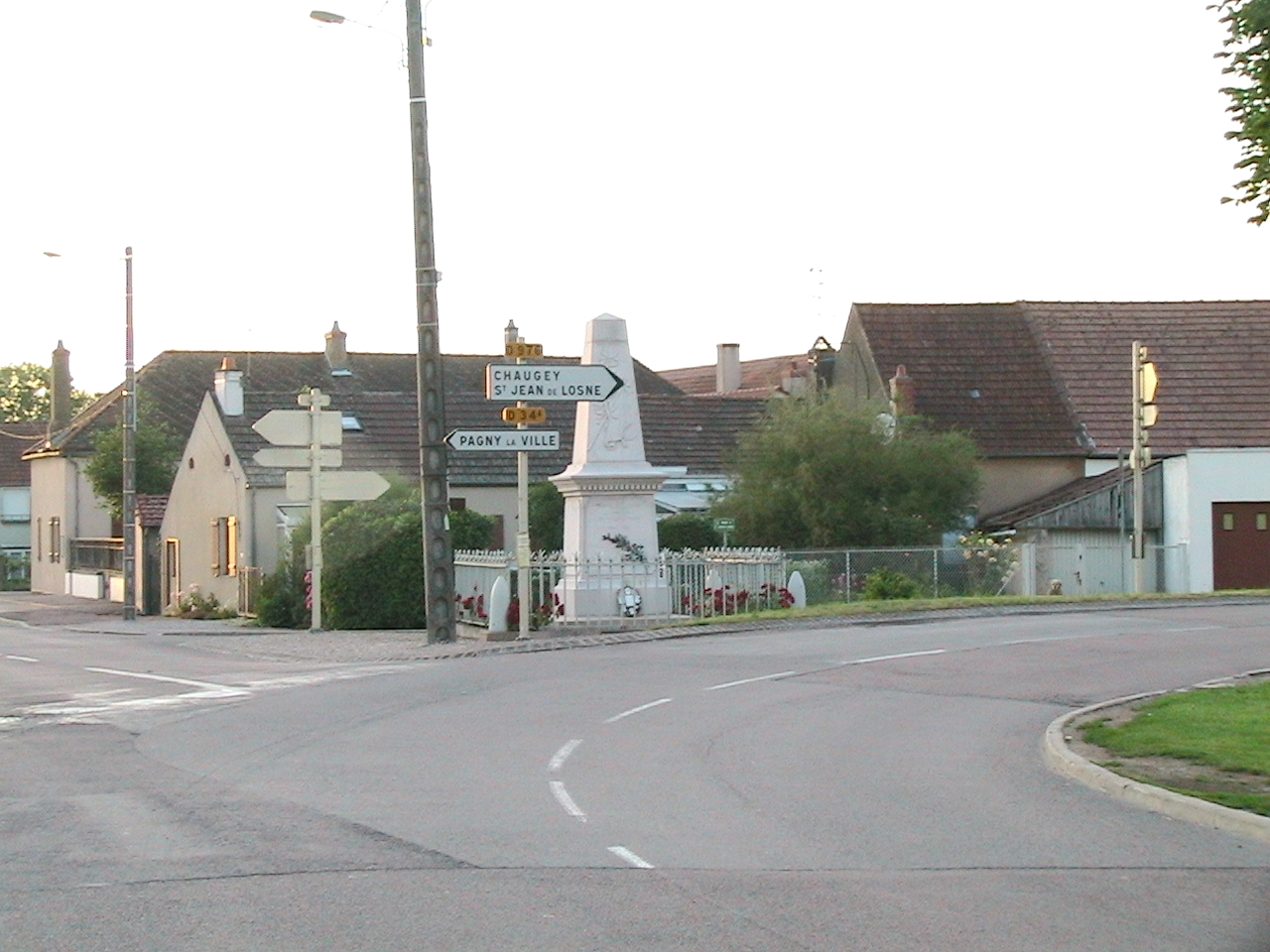
Pagny-le-Château : War Memorial (1914-1918 and 1939-1945)
