= Frénois =

Frénois may refer to the following places in France:

- Frénois, Côte-d'Or, a commune in the Côte-d'Or department
- Frénois, Vosges, a commune in the Vosges department
