= Poiseul-lès-Saulx =

- Commune
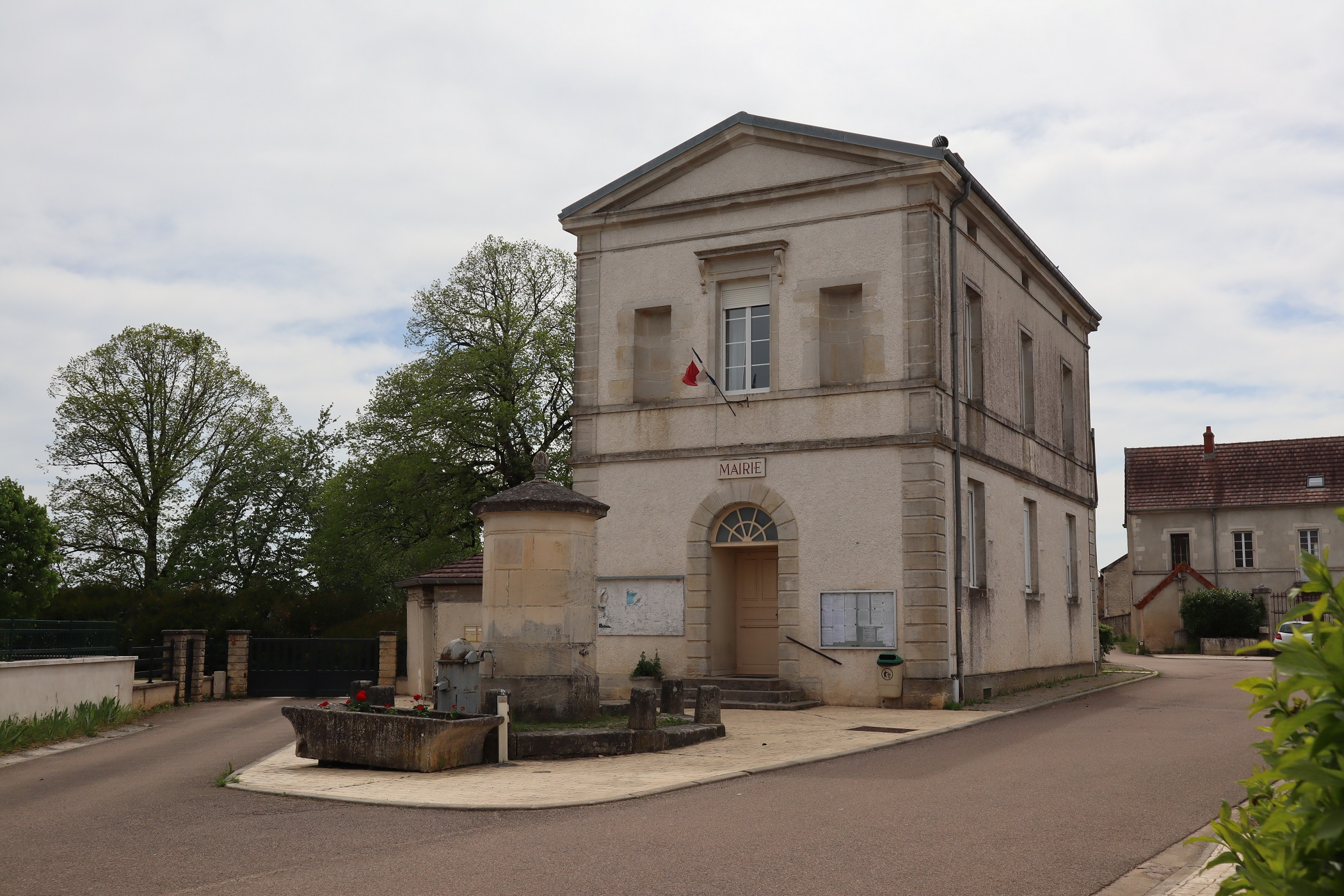
- Town hall

- Coat of arms
- Location of Poiseul-lès-Saulx
- Location within France Location within Bourgogne-Franche-Comté
- Coordinates: 47°34′30″N 4°59′36″E
- Country: France
- Region: Bourgogne-Franche-Comté
- Department: Côte-d'Or
- Arrondissement: Dijon
- Canton: Is-sur-Tille

Government
  - Mayor (2020–2026): Éric Royer
- Area^{1}: 15.13 km^{2} (5.84 sq mi)
- Elevation: 427 m (1,401 ft)
- Highest elevation: 485 m (1,591 ft)
- Lowest elevation: 324 m (1,063 ft)
- Population (2023): 77
  - Density: 5.1/km^{2} (13/sq mi)
- Time zone: UTC+01:00 (CET)
  - Summer (DST): UTC+02:00 (CEST)
- INSEE/Postal code: 21491 /21120
- ^{1} French Land Register data, which excludes lakes, ponds, glaciers > 1 km^{2} (0.386 sq mi or 247 acres) and river estuaries.

Poiseul-lès-Saulx (French pronunciation: [pwazœl lɛ so], literally Poiseul near Saulx) is a commune in the Côte-d'Or department in eastern France.

== Population ==
Historical population
Year	Pop.	±% p.a.
1968	64	—
1975	57	−1.64%
1982	76	+4.20%
1990	51	−4.86%
1999	48	−0.67%
2007	59	+2.61%
2012	63	+1.32%
2017	67	+1.24%
2023	77	+2.35%
Source: INSEE

== See also ==
- Communes of the Côte-d'Or department
