= Bussières, Côte-d'Or =

Bussières
- Commune
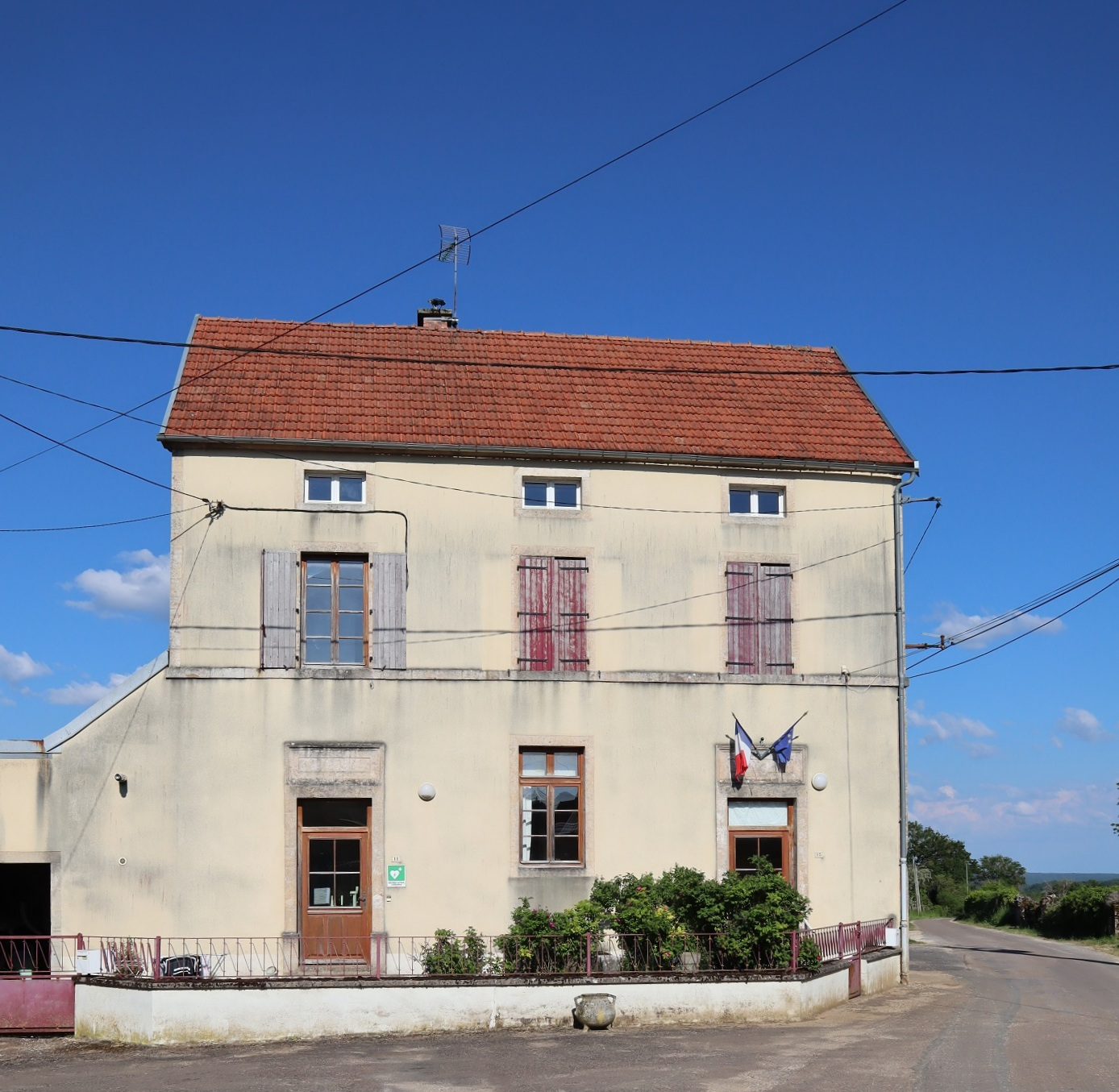
- Town hall
- Location of Bussières
- Location within France Location within Bourgogne-Franche-Comté
- Coordinates: 47°39′52″N 4°57′58″E
- Country: France
- Region: Bourgogne-Franche-Comté
- Department: Côte-d'Or
- Arrondissement: Dijon
- Canton: Is-sur-Tille

Government
  - Mayor (2020–2026): Pierre Pagot
- Area^{1}: 6.31 km^{2} (2.44 sq mi)
- Elevation: 475 m (1,558 ft)
- Highest elevation: 500 m (1,600 ft)
- Lowest elevation: 370 m (1,210 ft)
- Population (2023): 44
  - Density: 7.0/km^{2} (18/sq mi)
- Time zone: UTC+01:00 (CET)
  - Summer (DST): UTC+02:00 (CEST)
- INSEE/Postal code: 21119 /21580
- ^{1} French Land Register data, which excludes lakes, ponds, glaciers > 1 km^{2} (0.386 sq mi or 247 acres) and river estuaries.

Bussières (French pronunciation: [bysjɛʁ]) is a commune in the Côte-d'Or department in eastern France.

== Population ==
Historical population
Year	Pop.	±% p.a.
1968	56	—
1975	46	−2.77%
1982	38	−2.69%
1990	50	+3.49%
1999	47	−0.69%
2007	40	−2.00%
2012	41	+0.50%
2017	41	+0.00%
2023	44	+1.18%
Source: INSEE

== See also ==
- Communes of the Côte-d'Or department
