= Vernois-lès-Vesvres =

- Commune
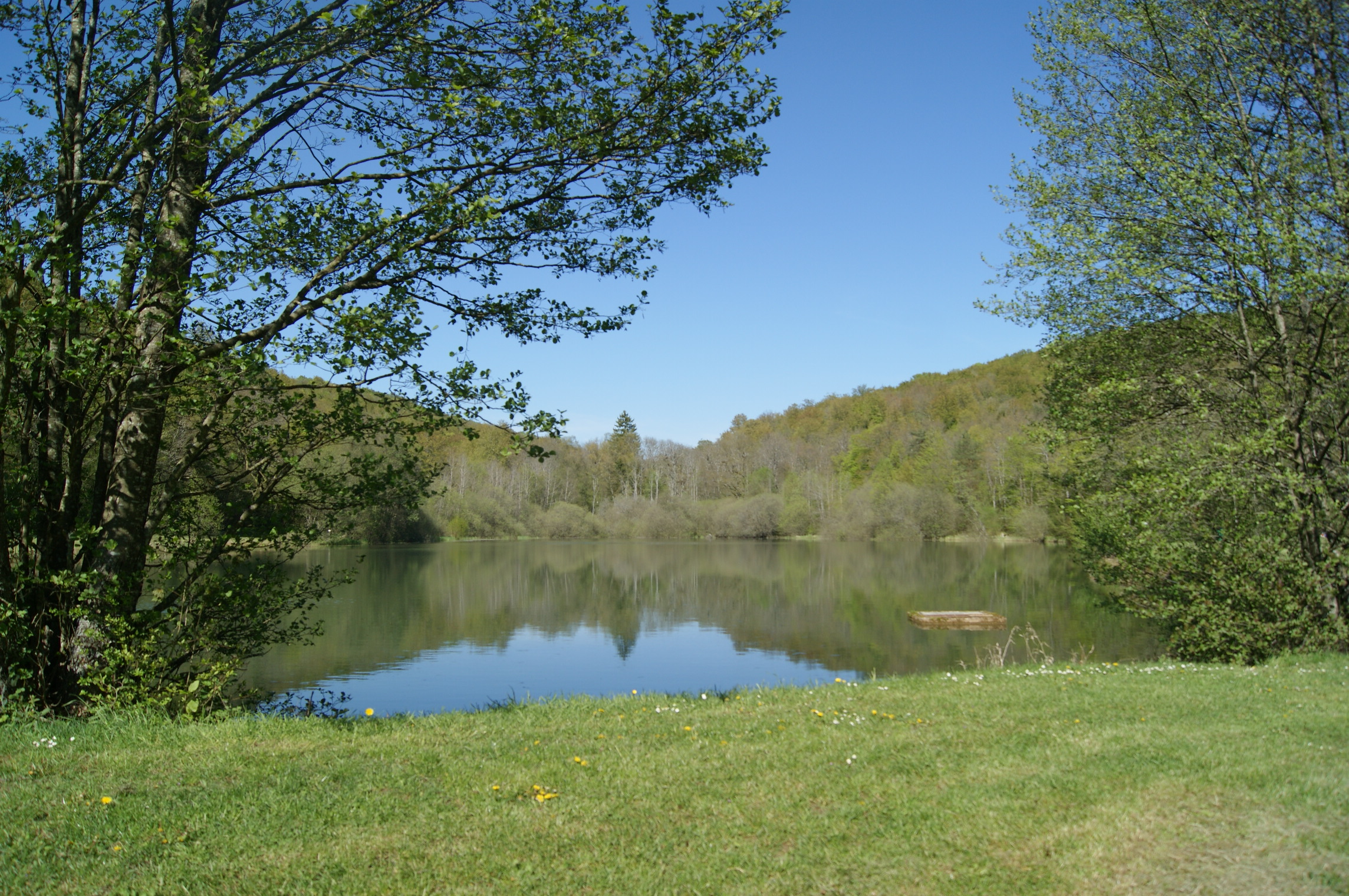
- The lake in Vernois-lès-Vesvres
- Location of Vernois-lès-Vesvres
- Location within France Location within Bourgogne-Franche-Comté
- Coordinates: 47°38′37″N 5°08′46″E
- Country: France
- Region: Bourgogne-Franche-Comté
- Department: Côte-d'Or
- Arrondissement: Dijon
- Canton: Is-sur-Tille
- Intercommunality: Tille et Venelle

Government
  - Mayor (2020–2026): Jean-Paul Taillandier
- Area^{1}: 11.51 km^{2} (4.44 sq mi)
- Highest elevation: 472 m (1,549 ft)
- Lowest elevation: 322 m (1,056 ft)
- Population (2023): 151
  - Density: 13.1/km^{2} (34.0/sq mi)
- Time zone: UTC+01:00 (CET)
  - Summer (DST): UTC+02:00 (CEST)
- INSEE/Postal code: 21665 /21260
- ^{1} French Land Register data, which excludes lakes, ponds, glaciers > 1 km^{2} (0.386 sq mi or 247 acres) and river estuaries.

Vernois-lès-Vesvres (French pronunciation: [vɛʁnwa lɛ vɛvʁ], literally Vernois near Vesvres) is a commune in the Côte-d'Or department in eastern France.

== Population ==
Historical population
Year	Pop.	±% p.a.
1968	44	—
1975	65	+5.73%
1982	131	+10.53%
1990	164	+2.85%
1999	189	+1.59%
2007	186	−0.20%
2012	195	+0.95%
2017	175	−2.14%
2023	151	−2.43%
Source: INSEE

== See also ==
- Communes of the Côte-d'Or department
