= Boussenois =

- Commune
- Location of Boussenois
- Location within France Location within Bourgogne-Franche-Comté
- Coordinates: 47°37′50″N 5°12′39″E
- Country: France
- Region: Bourgogne-Franche-Comté
- Department: Côte-d'Or
- Arrondissement: Dijon
- Canton: Is-sur-Tille
- Intercommunality: Tille et Venelle

Government
  - Mayor (2020–2026): Stéphane Guinot
- Area^{1}: 12.49 km^{2} (4.82 sq mi)
- Highest elevation: 469 m (1,539 ft)
- Lowest elevation: 304 m (997 ft)
- Population (2023): 110
  - Density: 8.8/km^{2} (23/sq mi)
- Time zone: UTC+01:00 (CET)
  - Summer (DST): UTC+02:00 (CEST)
- INSEE/Postal code: 21096 /21260
- ^{1} French Land Register data, which excludes lakes, ponds, glaciers > 1 km^{2} (0.386 sq mi or 247 acres) and river estuaries.

Boussenois (French pronunciation: [busnwa]) is a commune in the Côte-d'Or department in eastern France.

== Population ==
Historical population
Year	Pop.	±% p.a.
1968	98	—
1975	125	+3.54%
1982	110	−1.81%
1990	120	+1.09%
1999	111	−0.86%
2007	120	+0.98%
2012	110	−1.73%
2017	118	+1.41%
2023	110	−1.16%
Source: INSEE

== See also ==
- Communes of the Côte-d'Or department
