= Léry, Côte-d'Or =

Léry
- Commune
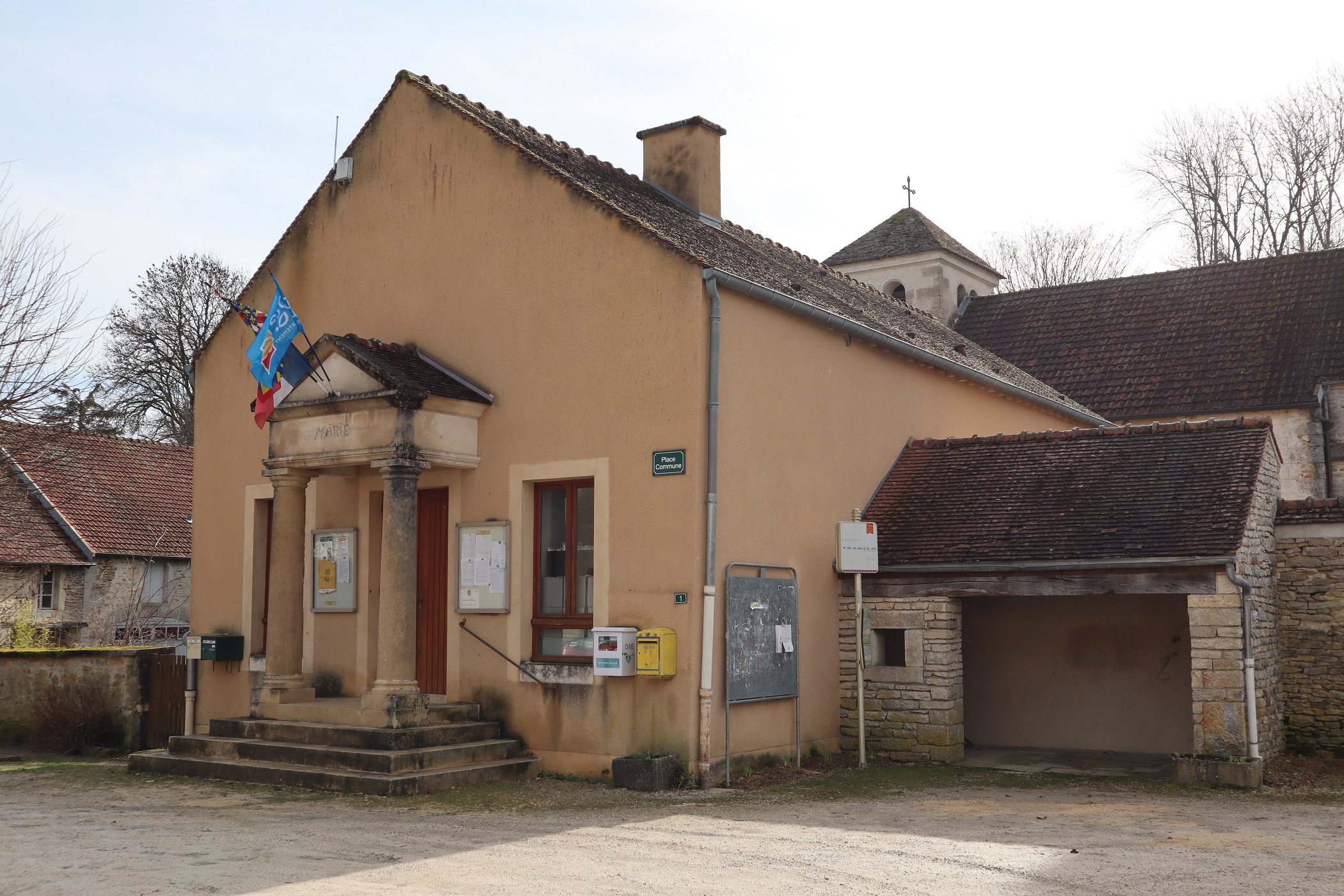
- Town hall
- Location of Léry
- Location within France Location within Bourgogne-Franche-Comté
- Coordinates: 47°33′27″N 4°50′30″E
- Country: France
- Region: Bourgogne-Franche-Comté
- Department: Côte-d'Or
- Arrondissement: Dijon
- Canton: Is-sur-Tille

Government
  - Mayor (2020–2026): Catherine Burille
- Area^{1}: 14.62 km^{2} (5.64 sq mi)
- Elevation: 350 m (1,150 ft)
- Highest elevation: 503 m (1,650 ft)
- Lowest elevation: 338 m (1,109 ft)
- Population (2023): 204
  - Density: 14.0/km^{2} (36.1/sq mi)
- Time zone: UTC+01:00 (CET)
  - Summer (DST): UTC+02:00 (CEST)
- INSEE/Postal code: 21345 /21440
- ^{1} French Land Register data, which excludes lakes, ponds, glaciers > 1 km^{2} (0.386 sq mi or 247 acres) and river estuaries.

Léry (French pronunciation: [leʁi]) is a commune in the Côte-d'Or department in eastern France.

== Population ==
Historical population
Year	Pop.	±% p.a.
1968	384	—
1975	364	−0.76%
1982	297	−2.86%
1990	270	−1.18%
1999	235	−1.53%
2007	224	−0.60%
2012	218	−0.54%
2017	196	−2.11%
2023	204	+0.67%
Source: INSEE

== See also ==
- Communes of the Côte-d'Or department
