= Tarsul =

- Commune
- Location of Tarsul
- Location within France Location within Bourgogne-Franche-Comté
- Coordinates: 47°31′56″N 4°59′11″E
- Country: France
- Region: Bourgogne-Franche-Comté
- Department: Côte-d'Or
- Arrondissement: Dijon
- Canton: Is-sur-Tille

Government
  - Mayor (2020–2026): Fabien Buntz
- Area^{1}: 9.57 km^{2} (3.69 sq mi)
- Elevation: 299 m (981 ft)
- Highest elevation: 447 m (1,467 ft)
- Lowest elevation: 297 m (974 ft)
- Population (2023): 166
  - Density: 17.3/km^{2} (44.9/sq mi)
- Time zone: UTC+01:00 (CET)
  - Summer (DST): UTC+02:00 (CEST)
- INSEE/Postal code: 21620 /21120
- ^{1} French Land Register data, which excludes lakes, ponds, glaciers > 1 km^{2} (0.386 sq mi or 247 acres) and river estuaries.

Tarsul (French pronunciation: [taʁsyl]) is a commune in the Côte-d'Or department in eastern France.

== Population ==
Historical population
Year	Pop.	±% p.a.
1968	84	—
1975	96	+1.93%
1982	125	+3.84%
1990	127	+0.20%
1999	124	−0.27%
2007	159	+3.16%
2012	164	+0.62%
2017	150	−1.77%
2023	166	+1.70%
Source: INSEE

== See also ==
- Communes of the Côte-d'Or department
