= Le Meix =

- Commune
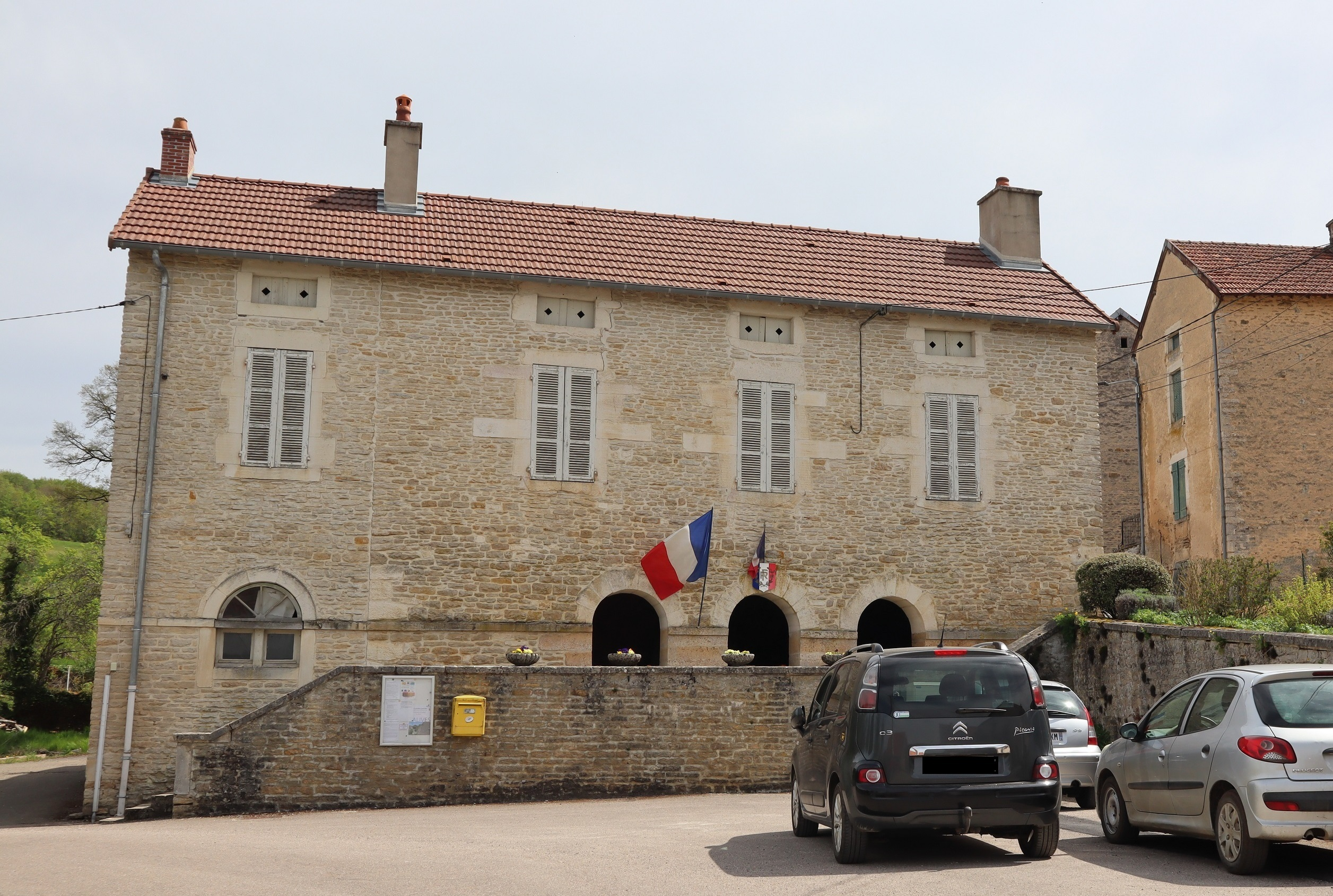
- Town hall
- Location of Le Meix
- Location within France Location within Bourgogne-Franche-Comté
- Coordinates: 47°36′06″N 4°56′33″E
- Country: France
- Region: Bourgogne-Franche-Comté
- Department: Côte-d'Or
- Arrondissement: Dijon
- Canton: Is-sur-Tille

Government
  - Mayor (2020–2026): Bernard Pitre
- Area^{1}: 10.61 km^{2} (4.10 sq mi)
- Elevation: 430 m (1,410 ft)
- Highest elevation: 519 m (1,703 ft)
- Lowest elevation: 340 m (1,120 ft)
- Population (2023): 41
  - Density: 3.9/km^{2} (10/sq mi)
- Time zone: UTC+01:00 (CET)
  - Summer (DST): UTC+02:00 (CEST)
- INSEE/Postal code: 21400 /21580
- ^{1} French Land Register data, which excludes lakes, ponds, glaciers > 1 km^{2} (0.386 sq mi or 247 acres) and river estuaries.

Le Meix is a commune in the Côte-d'Or department in eastern France.

== Population ==
Historical population
Year	Pop.	±% p.a.
1968	87	—
1975	60	−5.17%
1982	42	−4.97%
1990	44	+0.58%
1999	51	+1.65%
2007	45	−1.55%
2012	48	+1.30%
2017	50	+0.82%
2023	41	−3.25%
Source: INSEE

== See also ==
- Communes of the Côte-d'Or department
