= Gemeaux =

- Commune
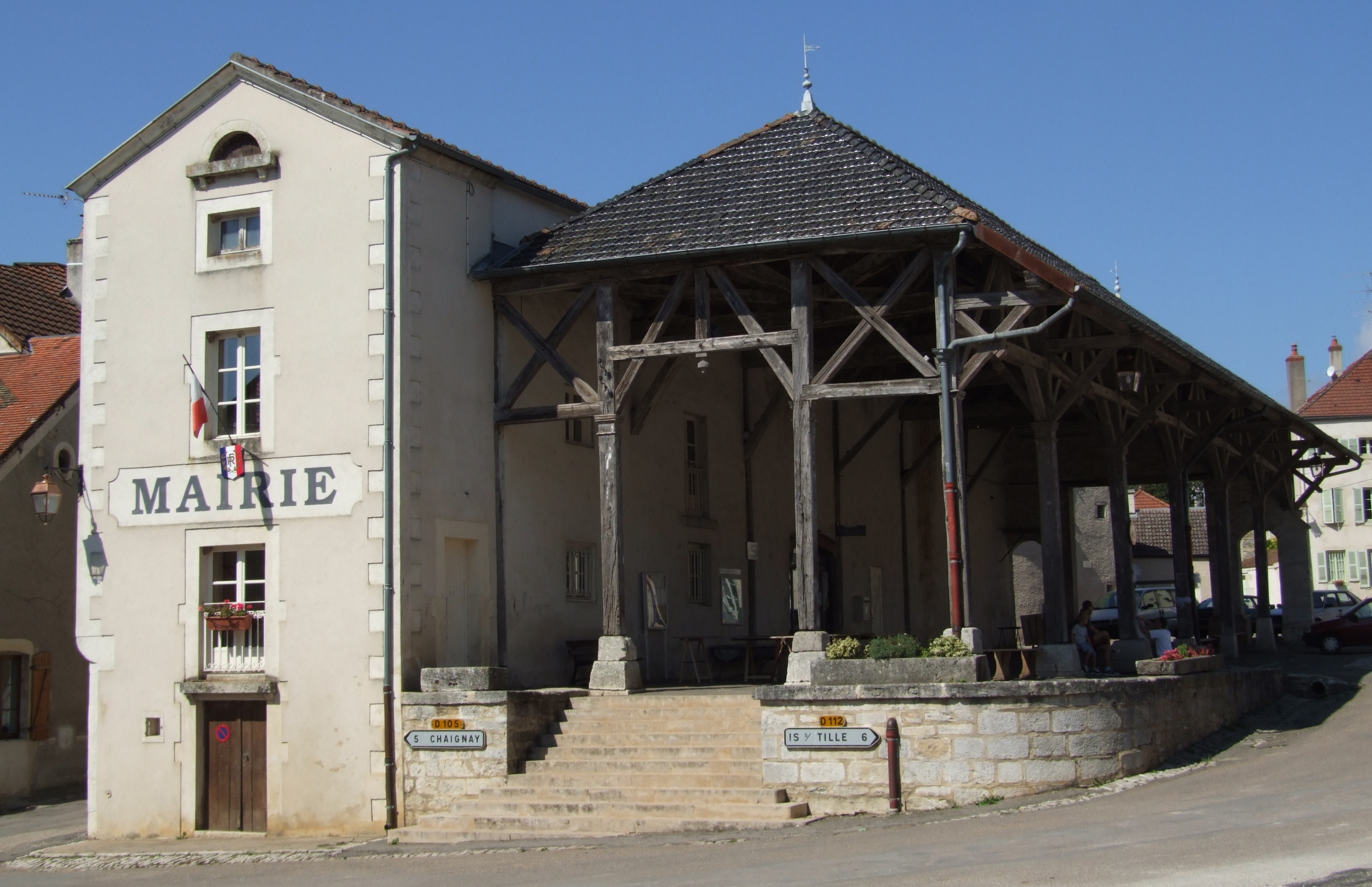
- Town hall and market hall
- Location of Gemeaux
- Location within France Location within Bourgogne-Franche-Comté
- Coordinates: 47°28′43″N 5°08′15″E
- Country: France
- Region: Bourgogne-Franche-Comté
- Department: Côte-d'Or
- Arrondissement: Dijon
- Canton: Is-sur-Tille

Government
  - Mayor (2020–2026): Steve Renaud
- Area^{1}: 19.34 km^{2} (7.47 sq mi)
- Elevation: 340 m (1,120 ft)
- Highest elevation: 333 m (1,093 ft)
- Lowest elevation: 251 m (823 ft)
- Population (2023): 974
  - Density: 50.4/km^{2} (130/sq mi)
- Time zone: UTC+01:00 (CET)
  - Summer (DST): UTC+02:00 (CEST)
- INSEE/Postal code: 21290 /21120
- ^{1} French Land Register data, which excludes lakes, ponds, glaciers > 1 km^{2} (0.386 sq mi or 247 acres) and river estuaries.

Gemeaux (French pronunciation: [ʒəmo]) is a commune in the Côte-d'Or department in eastern France.

== Population ==
Historical population
| Year | Pop. | ±% p.a. |
|---|---|---|
| 1968 | 601 | — |
| 1975 | 607 | +0.14% |
| 1982 | 625 | +0.42% |
| 1990 | 666 | +0.80% |
| 1999 | 761 | +1.49% |
| 2007 | 856 | +1.48% |
| 2012 | 877 | +0.49% |
| 2017 | 872 | −0.11% |
| 2023 | 974 | +1.86% |
Source: INSEE

== See also ==
- Communes of the Côte-d'Or department
