= Villey-sur-Tille =

- Commune
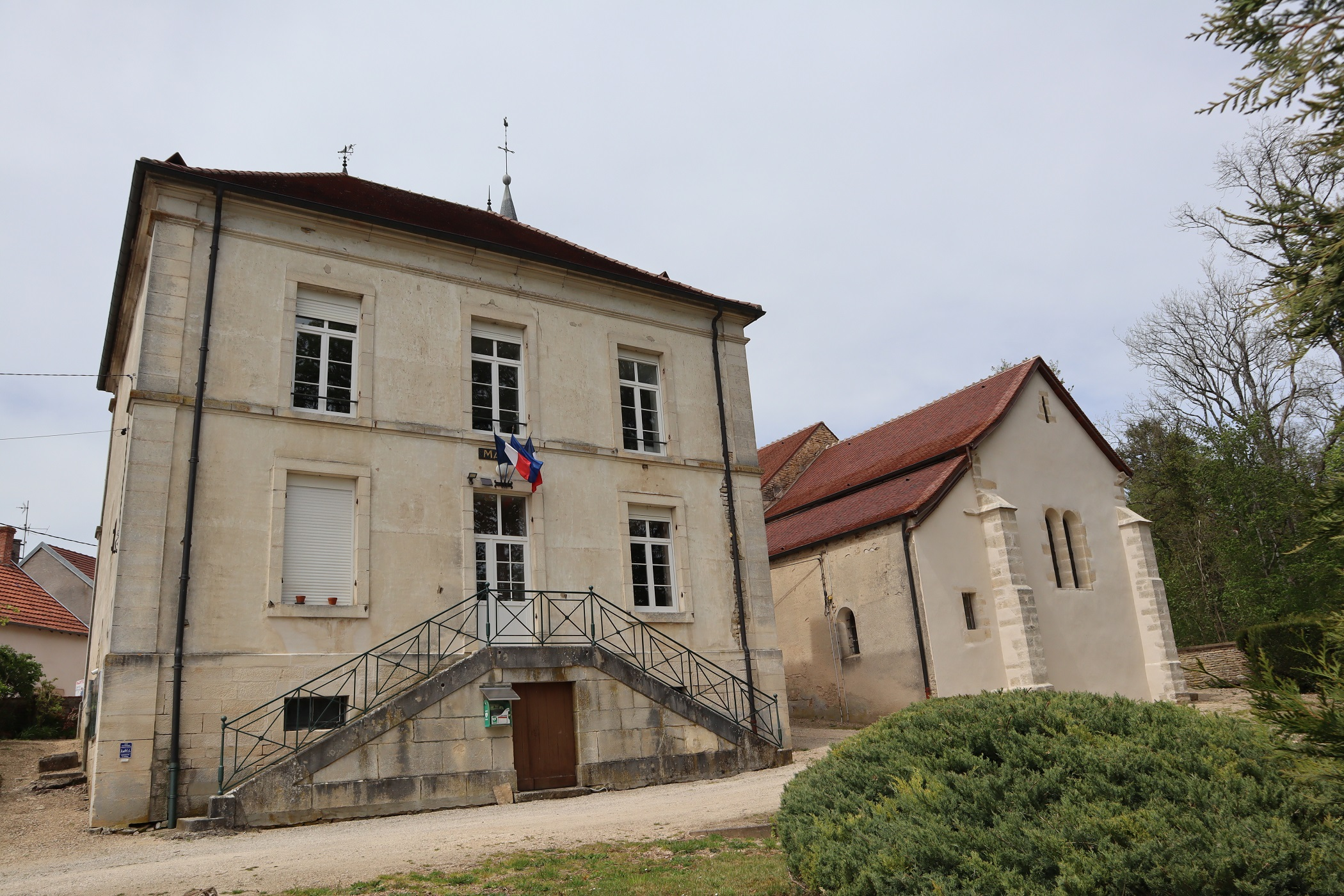
- Town hall
- Location of Villey-sur-Tille
- Location within France Location within Bourgogne-Franche-Comté
- Coordinates: 47°33′50″N 5°07′02″E
- Country: France
- Region: Bourgogne-Franche-Comté
- Department: Côte-d'Or
- Arrondissement: Dijon
- Canton: Is-sur-Tille

Government
  - Mayor (2020–2026): Xavier Uhl
- Area^{1}: 12.78 km^{2} (4.93 sq mi)
- Elevation: 282 m (925 ft)
- Highest elevation: 443 m (1,453 ft)
- Lowest elevation: 273 m (896 ft)
- Population (2023): 264
  - Density: 20.7/km^{2} (53.5/sq mi)
- Time zone: UTC+01:00 (CET)
  - Summer (DST): UTC+02:00 (CEST)
- INSEE/Postal code: 21702 /21120
- ^{1} French Land Register data, which excludes lakes, ponds, glaciers > 1 km^{2} (0.386 sq mi or 247 acres) and river estuaries.

Villey-sur-Tille (French pronunciation: [vijɛ syʁ tij], literally Villey on Tille) is a commune in the Côte-d'Or department in eastern France.

== Population ==
Historical population
Year	Pop.	±% p.a.
1968	220	—
1975	168	−3.78%
1982	194	+2.08%
1990	259	+3.68%
1999	277	+0.75%
2007	285	+0.36%
2012	278	−0.50%
2017	267	−0.80%
2023	264	−0.19%
Source: INSEE

== See also ==
- Communes of the Côte-d'Or department
