= Villecomte =

- Commune
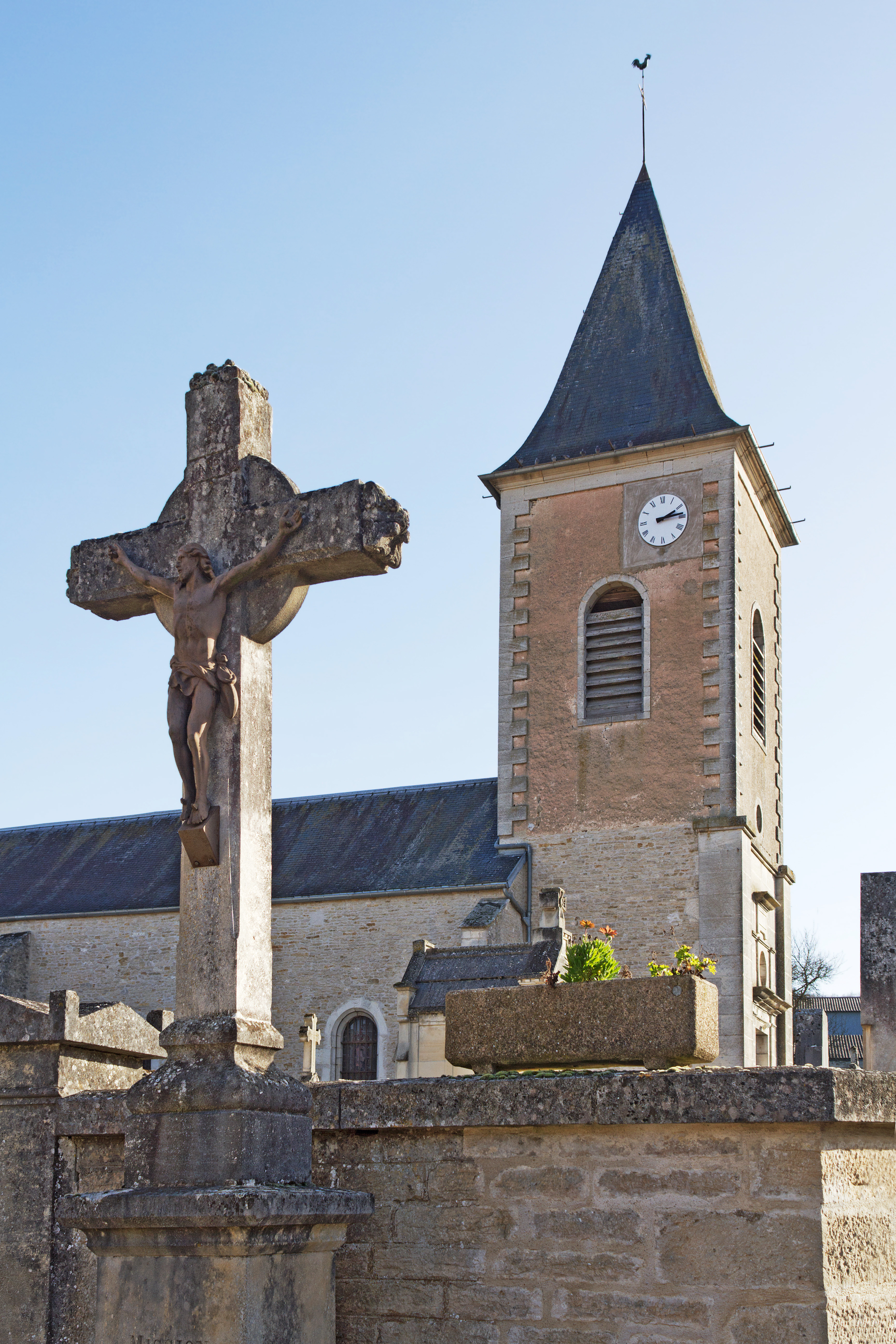
- The church and cross in Villecomte

- Coat of arms
- Location of Villecomte
- Location within France Location within Bourgogne-Franche-Comté
- Coordinates: 47°30′39″N 5°02′10″E
- Country: France
- Region: Bourgogne-Franche-Comté
- Department: Côte-d'Or
- Arrondissement: Dijon
- Canton: Is-sur-Tille

Government
  - Mayor (2020–2026): Jean-Pierre Michelet
- Area^{1}: 16.41 km^{2} (6.34 sq mi)
- Elevation: 300 m (980 ft)
- Highest elevation: 524 m (1,719 ft)
- Lowest elevation: 287 m (942 ft)
- Population (2023): 247
  - Density: 15.1/km^{2} (39.0/sq mi)
- Time zone: UTC+01:00 (CET)
  - Summer (DST): UTC+02:00 (CEST)
- INSEE/Postal code: 21692 /21120
- ^{1} French Land Register data, which excludes lakes, ponds, glaciers > 1 km^{2} (0.386 sq mi or 247 acres) and river estuaries.

Villecomte (French pronunciation: [vilkɔ̃t]) is a commune in the Côte-d'Or department in eastern France.

== Population ==
Historical population
Year	Pop.	±% p.a.
1968	162	—
1975	168	+0.52%
1982	191	+1.85%
1990	191	+0.00%
1999	188	−0.18%
2007	248	+3.52%
2012	258	+0.79%
2017	253	−0.39%
2023	247	−0.40%
Source: INSEE

== See also ==
- Communes of the Côte-d'Or department
