= Vernot =

- Commune
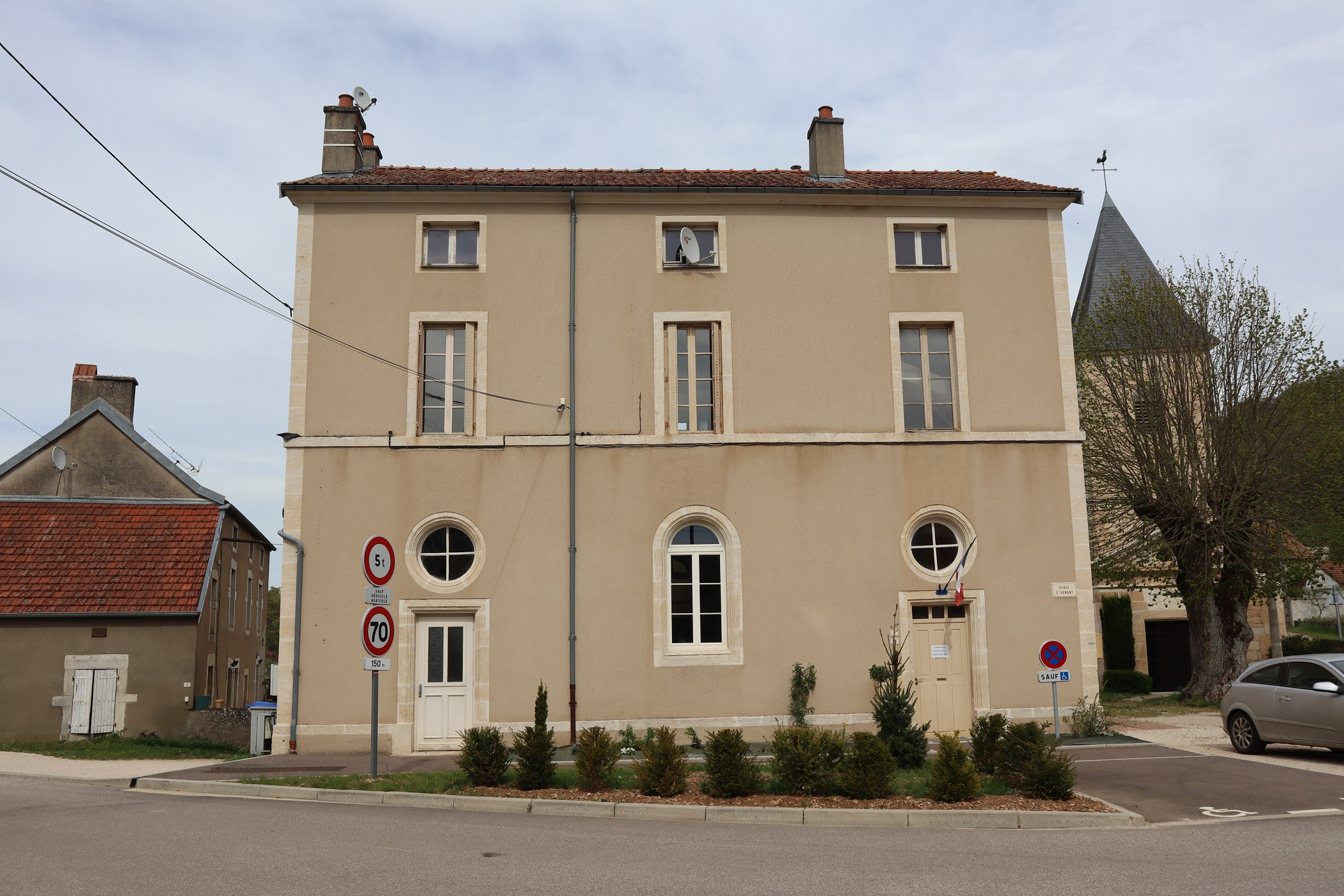
- Town hall
- Location of Vernot
- Location within France Location within Bourgogne-Franche-Comté
- Coordinates: 47°29′29″N 4°58′27″E
- Country: France
- Region: Bourgogne-Franche-Comté
- Department: Côte-d'Or
- Arrondissement: Dijon
- Canton: Is-sur-Tille

Government
  - Mayor (2020–2026): Jean-Marc Bard
- Area^{1}: 12.91 km^{2} (4.98 sq mi)
- Elevation: 322 m (1,056 ft)
- Highest elevation: 555 m (1,821 ft)
- Lowest elevation: 317 m (1,040 ft)
- Population (2023): 97
  - Density: 7.5/km^{2} (19/sq mi)
- Time zone: UTC+01:00 (CET)
  - Summer (DST): UTC+02:00 (CEST)
- INSEE/Postal code: 21666 /21120
- ^{1} French Land Register data, which excludes lakes, ponds, glaciers > 1 km^{2} (0.386 sq mi or 247 acres) and river estuaries.

Vernot (French pronunciation: [vɛʁno]) is a commune in the eastern French department of Côte-d'Or.

== Population ==
Historical population
Year	Pop.	±% p.a.
1968	96	—
1975	65	−5.42%
1982	71	+1.27%
1990	74	+0.52%
1999	90	+2.20%
2007	76	−2.09%
2012	74	−0.53%
2017	85	+2.81%
2023	97	+2.23%
Source: INSEE

== See also ==
- Communes of the Côte-d'Or department
