= Chaignay =

- Commune
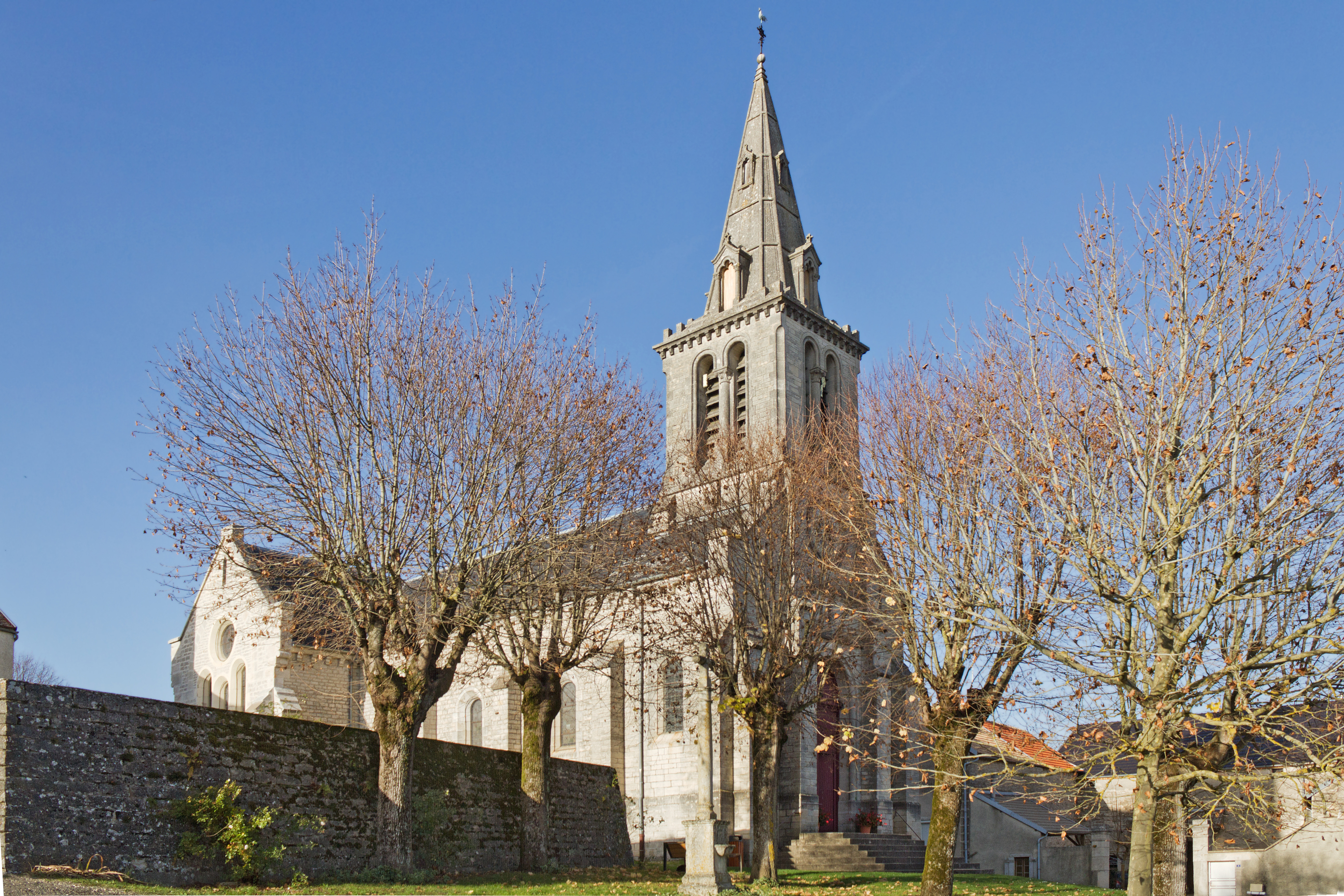
- The church in Chaignay

- Coat of arms
- Location of Chaignay
- Location within France Location within Bourgogne-Franche-Comté
- Coordinates: 47°28′39″N 5°04′16″E
- Country: France
- Region: Bourgogne-Franche-Comté
- Department: Côte-d'Or
- Arrondissement: Dijon
- Canton: Is-sur-Tille

Government
  - Mayor (2020–2026): Gilles Biancone
- Area^{1}: 25.05 km^{2} (9.67 sq mi)
- Elevation: 365 m (1,198 ft)
- Highest elevation: 536 m (1,759 ft)
- Lowest elevation: 282 m (925 ft)
- Population (2023): 493
  - Density: 19.7/km^{2} (51.0/sq mi)
- Time zone: UTC+01:00 (CET)
  - Summer (DST): UTC+02:00 (CEST)
- INSEE/Postal code: 21127 /21120
- ^{1} French Land Register data, which excludes lakes, ponds, glaciers > 1 km^{2} (0.386 sq mi or 247 acres) and river estuaries.

Chaignay (French pronunciation: [ʃɛɲɛ]) is a commune in the Côte-d'Or department in eastern France.

== Population ==
Historical population
Year	Pop.	±% p.a.
1968	310	—
1975	311	+0.05%
1982	336	+1.11%
1990	369	+1.18%
1999	430	+1.71%
2007	494	+1.75%
2012	548	+2.10%
2017	517	−1.16%
2023	493	−0.79%
Source: INSEE

== See also ==
- Communes of the Côte-d'Or department
