= Foncegrive =

- Commune
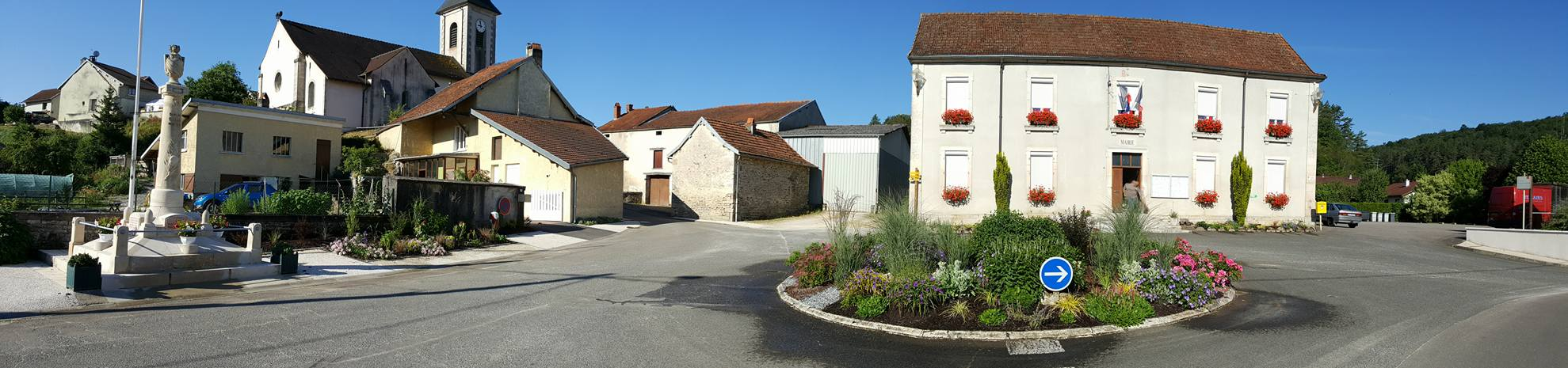
- The town hall and surroundings in Foncegrive
- Location of Foncegrive
- Location within France Location within Bourgogne-Franche-Comté
- Coordinates: 47°36′41″N 5°09′27″E
- Country: France
- Region: Bourgogne-Franche-Comté
- Department: Côte-d'Or
- Arrondissement: Dijon
- Canton: Is-sur-Tille
- Intercommunality: Tille et Venelle

Government
  - Mayor (2020–2026): Didier Mignotte
- Area^{1}: 10.13 km^{2} (3.91 sq mi)
- Highest elevation: 472 m (1,549 ft)
- Lowest elevation: 302 m (991 ft)
- Population (2023): 126
  - Density: 12.4/km^{2} (32.2/sq mi)
- Time zone: UTC+01:00 (CET)
  - Summer (DST): UTC+02:00 (CEST)
- INSEE/Postal code: 21275 /21260
- ^{1} French Land Register data, which excludes lakes, ponds, glaciers > 1 km^{2} (0.386 sq mi or 247 acres) and river estuaries.

Foncegrive (French pronunciation: [fɔ̃s.ɡʁiv]) is a commune in the Côte-d'Or department in eastern France.

== Population ==
Historical population
Year	Pop.	±% p.a.
1968	147	—
1975	187	+3.50%
1982	160	−2.20%
1990	152	−0.64%
1999	171	+1.32%
2007	154	−1.30%
2012	140	−1.89%
2017	135	−0.72%
2023	126	−1.14%
Source: INSEE

== See also ==
- Communes of the Côte-d'Or department
