= Moloy =

- Commune
- Location of Moloy
- Location within France Location within Bourgogne-Franche-Comté
- Coordinates: 47°32′27″N 4°56′39″E
- Country: France
- Region: Bourgogne-Franche-Comté
- Department: Côte-d'Or
- Arrondissement: Dijon
- Canton: Is-sur-Tille

Government
  - Mayor (2020–2026): Florian Paquet
- Area^{1}: 19.23 km^{2} (7.42 sq mi)
- Elevation: 320 m (1,050 ft)
- Highest elevation: 519 m (1,703 ft)
- Lowest elevation: 315 m (1,033 ft)
- Population (2023): 236
  - Density: 12.3/km^{2} (31.8/sq mi)
- Time zone: UTC+01:00 (CET)
  - Summer (DST): UTC+02:00 (CEST)
- INSEE/Postal code: 21421 /21120
- ^{1} French Land Register data, which excludes lakes, ponds, glaciers > 1 km^{2} (0.386 sq mi or 247 acres) and river estuaries.

Moloy (French pronunciation: [mɔlwa]) is a commune in the Côte-d'Or department in eastern France.

== Population ==
Historical population
Year	Pop.	±% p.a.
1968	215	—
1975	214	−0.07%
1982	207	−0.47%
1990	210	+0.18%
1999	219	+0.47%
2007	223	+0.23%
2012	215	−0.73%
2017	233	+1.62%
2023	236	+0.21%
Source: INSEE

== See also ==
- Communes of the Côte-d'Or department
