= Crécey-sur-Tille =

- Commune
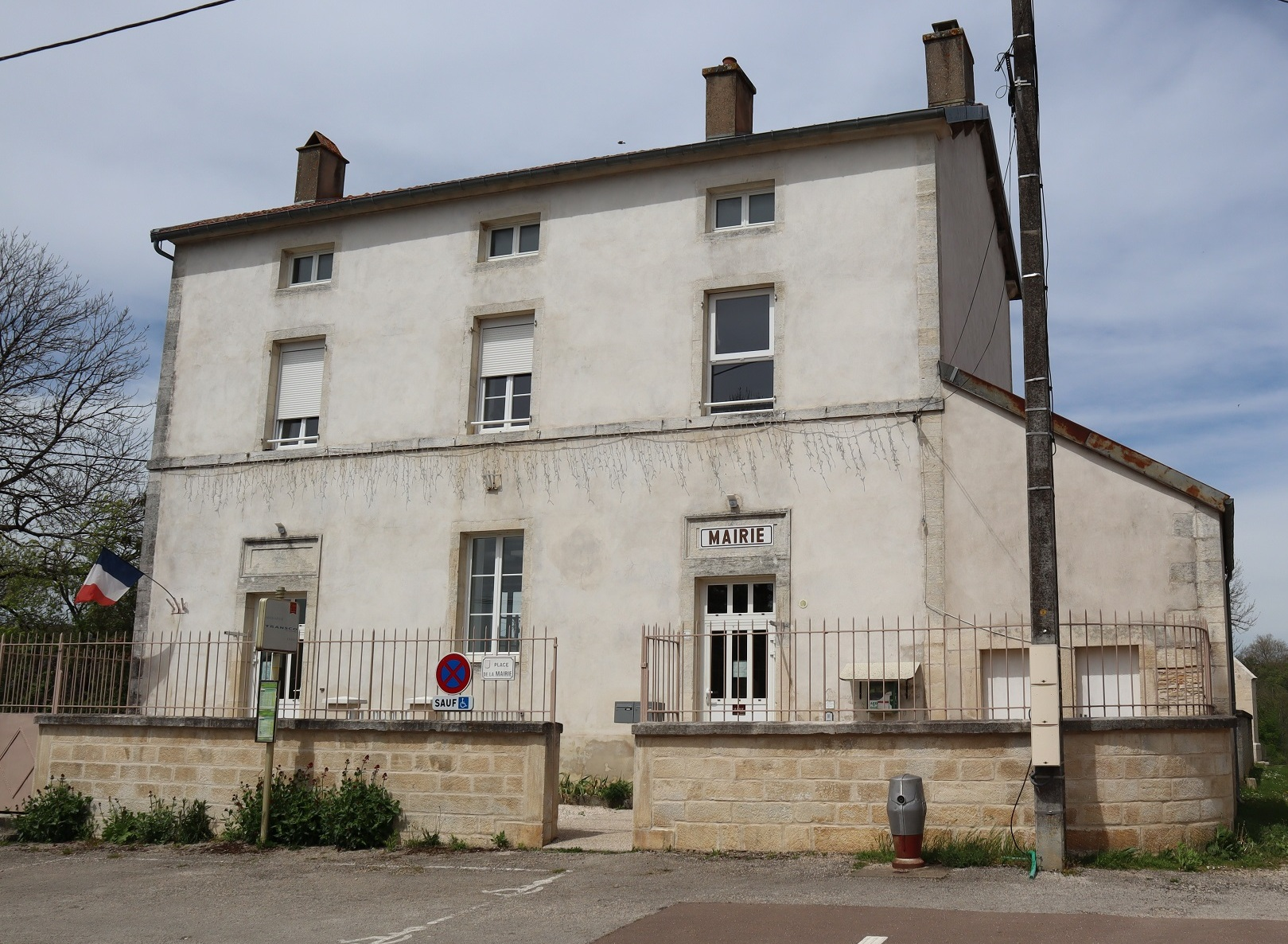
- Town hall
- Location of Crécey-sur-Tille
- Location within France Location within Bourgogne-Franche-Comté
- Coordinates: 47°33′32″N 5°07′44″E
- Country: France
- Region: Bourgogne-Franche-Comté
- Department: Côte-d'Or
- Arrondissement: Dijon
- Canton: Is-sur-Tille

Government
  - Mayor (2020–2026): Elisabeth Viénot
- Area^{1}: 10.77 km^{2} (4.16 sq mi)
- Elevation: 287 m (942 ft)
- Highest elevation: 424 m (1,391 ft)
- Lowest elevation: 272 m (892 ft)
- Population (2023): 127
  - Density: 11.8/km^{2} (30.5/sq mi)
- Time zone: UTC+01:00 (CET)
  - Summer (DST): UTC+02:00 (CEST)
- INSEE/Postal code: 21211 /21120
- ^{1} French Land Register data, which excludes lakes, ponds, glaciers > 1 km^{2} (0.386 sq mi or 247 acres) and river estuaries.

Crécey-sur-Tille (French pronunciation: [kʁesɛ syʁ tij]) is a commune in the Côte-d'Or department in eastern France.

== Population ==
Historical population
Year	Pop.	±% p.a.
1968	136	—
1975	133	−0.32%
1982	107	−3.06%
1990	124	+1.86%
1999	164	+3.16%
2007	167	+0.23%
2012	144	−2.92%
2017	142	−0.28%
2023	127	−1.84%
Source: INSEE

== See also ==
- Communes of the Côte-d'Or department
