= Courlon =

- Commune
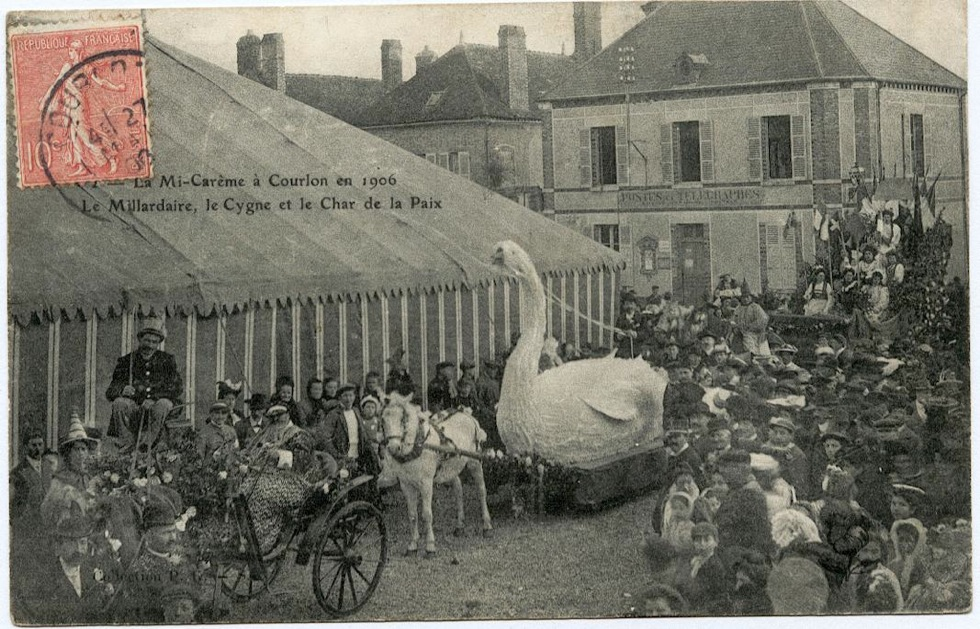
- The celebration of the third thursday in Lent, in 1906, in Courlon
- Location of Courlon
- Location within France Location within Bourgogne-Franche-Comté
- Coordinates: 47°39′12″N 5°00′21″E
- Country: France
- Region: Bourgogne-Franche-Comté
- Department: Côte-d'Or
- Arrondissement: Dijon
- Canton: Is-sur-Tille

Government
  - Mayor (2020–2026): Michel Guyot
- Area^{1}: 9.86 km^{2} (3.81 sq mi)
- Elevation: 340 m (1,120 ft)
- Highest elevation: 492 m (1,614 ft)
- Lowest elevation: 317 m (1,040 ft)
- Population (2023): 79
  - Density: 8.0/km^{2} (21/sq mi)
- Time zone: UTC+01:00 (CET)
  - Summer (DST): UTC+02:00 (CEST)
- INSEE/Postal code: 21207 /21580
- ^{1} French Land Register data, which excludes lakes, ponds, glaciers > 1 km^{2} (0.386 sq mi or 247 acres) and river estuaries.

Courlon (French pronunciation: [kuʁlɔ̃]) is a commune in the Côte-d'Or department in eastern France.

== Population ==
Historical population
Year	Pop.	±% p.a.
1968	97	—
1975	63	−5.98%
1982	53	−2.44%
1990	46	−1.76%
1999	50	+0.93%
2007	67	+3.73%
2012	77	+2.82%
2017	81	+1.02%
2023	79	−0.42%
Source: INSEE

== See also ==
- Communes of the Côte-d'Or department
