= Courtivron =

- Commune
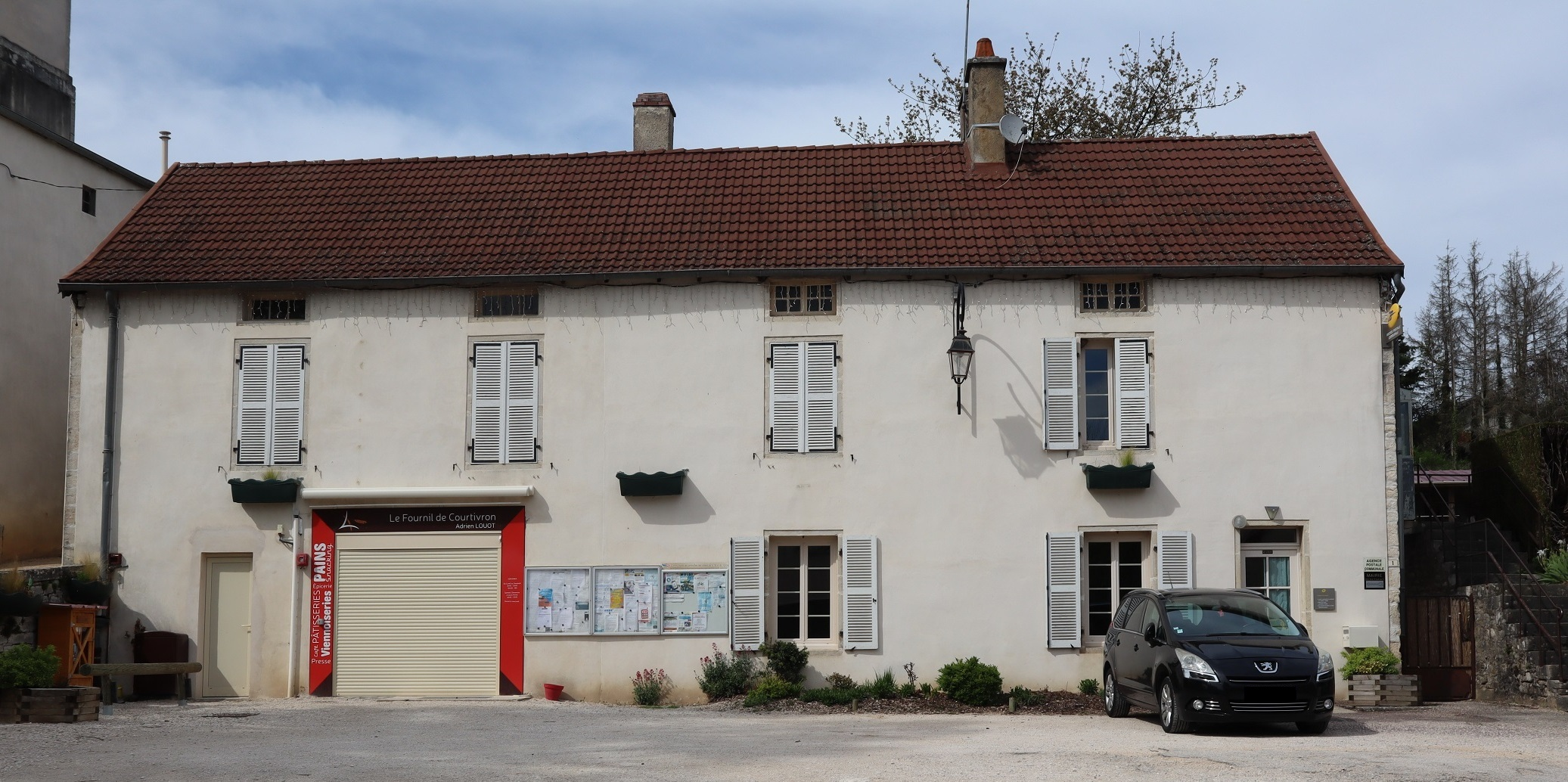
- Town hall
- Location of Courtivron
- Location within France Location within Bourgogne-Franche-Comté
- Coordinates: 47°32′28″N 4°58′00″E
- Country: France
- Region: Bourgogne-Franche-Comté
- Department: Côte-d'Or
- Arrondissement: Dijon
- Canton: Is-sur-Tille

Government
  - Mayor (2020–2026): Luc Baudry
- Area^{1}: 15.63 km^{2} (6.03 sq mi)
- Elevation: 321 m (1,053 ft)
- Highest elevation: 475 m (1,558 ft)
- Lowest elevation: 307 m (1,007 ft)
- Population (2023): 167
  - Density: 10.7/km^{2} (27.7/sq mi)
- Time zone: UTC+01:00 (CET)
  - Summer (DST): UTC+02:00 (CEST)
- INSEE/Postal code: 21208 /21120
- ^{1} French Land Register data, which excludes lakes, ponds, glaciers > 1 km^{2} (0.386 sq mi or 247 acres) and river estuaries.

Courtivron (French pronunciation: [kuʁtivʁɔ̃]) is a commune in the Côte-d'Or department in eastern France.

== Population ==
Historical population
Year	Pop.	±% p.a.
1968	133	—
1975	120	−1.46%
1982	152	+3.43%
1990	143	−0.76%
1999	163	+1.47%
2007	177	+1.04%
2012	193	+1.75%
2017	168	−2.74%
2023	167	−0.10%
Source: INSEE

== See also ==
- Communes of the Côte-d'Or department
