= Diénay =

- Commune
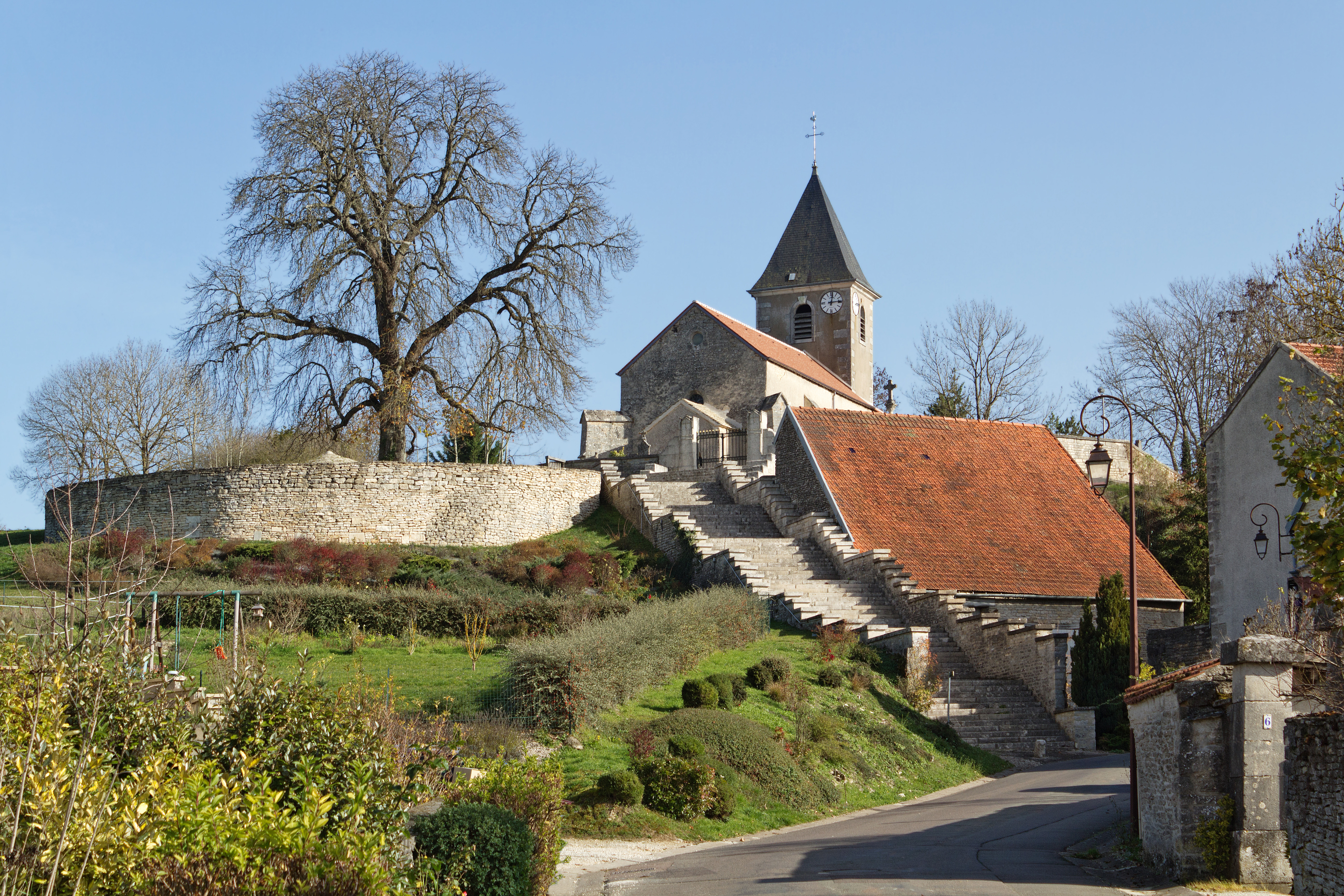
- The church in Diénay
- Location of Diénay
- Location within France Location within Bourgogne-Franche-Comté
- Coordinates: 47°31′17″N 5°04′01″E
- Country: France
- Region: Bourgogne-Franche-Comté
- Department: Côte-d'Or
- Arrondissement: Dijon
- Canton: Is-sur-Tille

Government
  - Mayor (2020–2026): André Liotard
- Area^{1}: 15.39 km^{2} (5.94 sq mi)
- Elevation: 287 m (942 ft)
- Highest elevation: 428 m (1,404 ft)
- Lowest elevation: 282 m (925 ft)
- Population (2023): 385
  - Density: 25.0/km^{2} (64.8/sq mi)
- Time zone: UTC+01:00 (CET)
  - Summer (DST): UTC+02:00 (CEST)
- INSEE/Postal code: 21230 /21120
- ^{1} French Land Register data, which excludes lakes, ponds, glaciers > 1 km^{2} (0.386 sq mi or 247 acres) and river estuaries.

Diénay is a commune in the Côte-d'Or department in eastern France.

== Population ==
Historical population
Year	Pop.	±% p.a.
1968	205	—
1975	165	−3.05%
1982	230	+4.86%
1990	241	+0.59%
1999	235	−0.28%
2007	255	+1.03%
2012	323	+4.84%
2017	376	+3.09%
2023	385	+0.40%
Source: INSEE

== See also ==
- Communes of the Côte-d'Or department
