= Poiseul-la-Grange =

- Commune
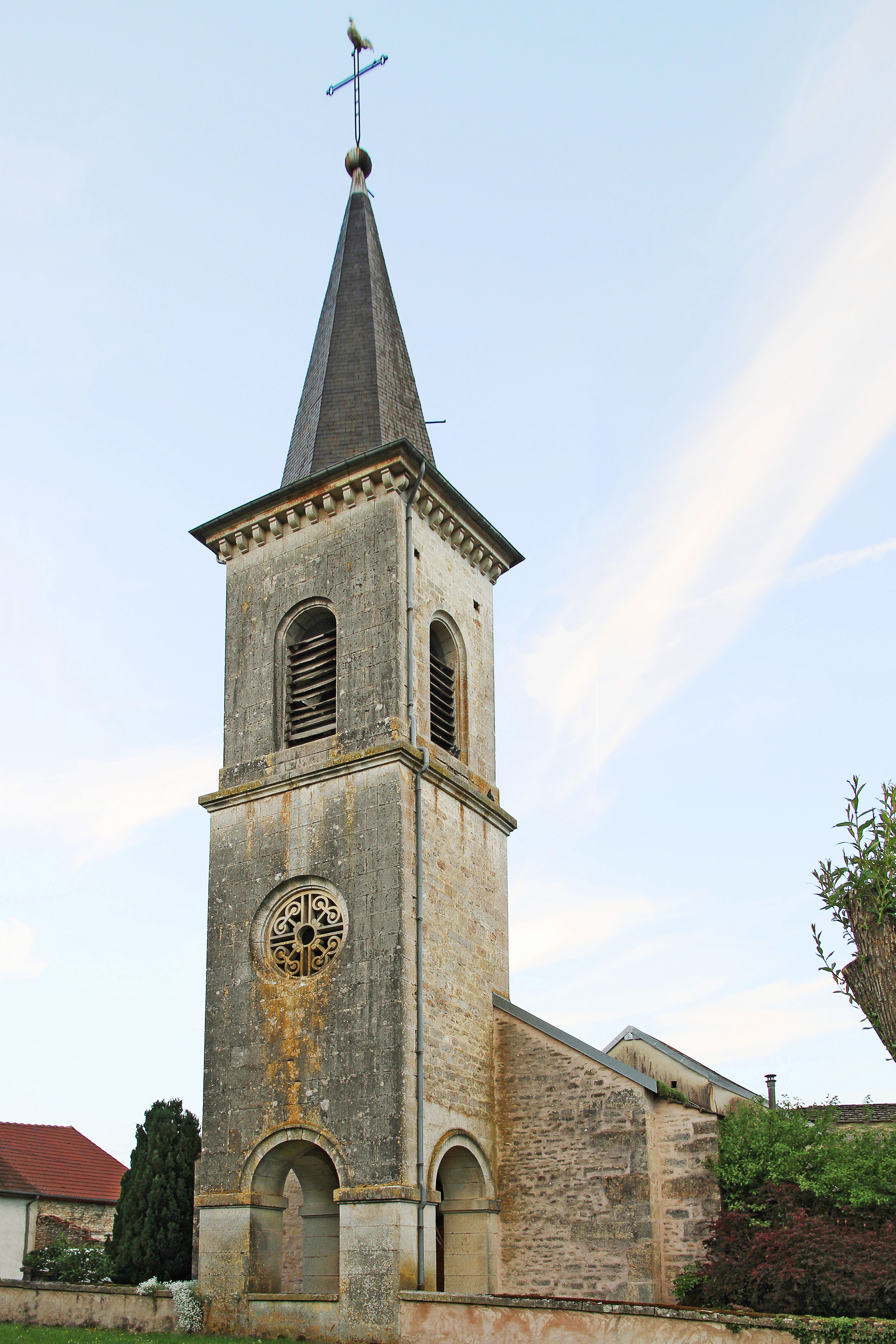
- The church in Poiseul-la-Grange
- Location of Poiseul-la-Grange
- Location within France Location within Bourgogne-Franche-Comté
- Coordinates: 47°34′38″N 4°48′18″E
- Country: France
- Region: Bourgogne-Franche-Comté
- Department: Côte-d'Or
- Arrondissement: Dijon
- Canton: Is-sur-Tille

Government
  - Mayor (2020–2026): Pascal Theïs
- Area^{1}: 22.89 km^{2} (8.84 sq mi)
- Elevation: 450 m (1,480 ft)
- Highest elevation: 506 m (1,660 ft)
- Lowest elevation: 370 m (1,210 ft)
- Population (2023): 75
  - Density: 3.3/km^{2} (8.5/sq mi)
- Time zone: UTC+01:00 (CET)
  - Summer (DST): UTC+02:00 (CEST)
- INSEE/Postal code: 21489 /21440
- ^{1} French Land Register data, which excludes lakes, ponds, glaciers > 1 km^{2} (0.386 sq mi or 247 acres) and river estuaries.

Poiseul-la-Grange (French pronunciation: [pwazœl la ɡʁɑ̃ʒ]) is a commune in the Côte-d'Or department in eastern France.

== Population ==
Historical population
Year	Pop.	±% p.a.
1968	139	—
1975	112	−3.04%
1982	86	−3.70%
1990	80	−0.90%
1999	70	−1.47%
2007	72	+0.35%
2012	60	−3.58%
2017	58	−0.68%
2023	75	+4.38%
Source: INSEE

== See also ==
- Communes of the Côte-d'Or department
