= Sacquenay =

- Commune
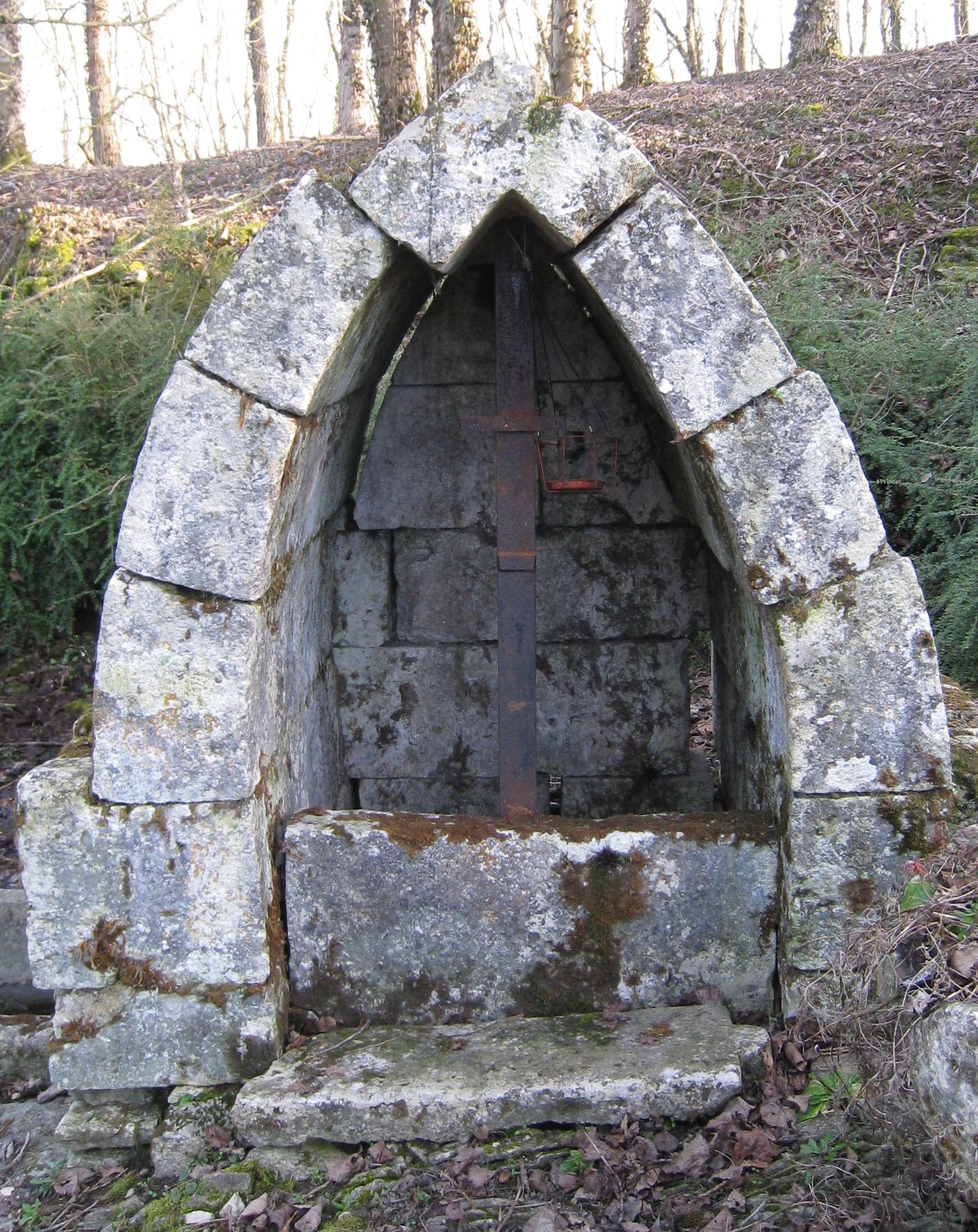
- The Buet fountain in Sacquenay
- Location of Sacquenay
- Location within France Location within Bourgogne-Franche-Comté
- Coordinates: 47°35′36″N 5°19′23″E
- Country: France
- Region: Bourgogne-Franche-Comté
- Department: Côte-d'Or
- Arrondissement: Dijon
- Canton: Is-sur-Tille
- Intercommunality: Tille et Venelle

Government
  - Mayor (2020–2026): Jean-Noël Truchot
- Area^{1}: 22.13 km^{2} (8.54 sq mi)
- Highest elevation: 331 m (1,086 ft)
- Lowest elevation: 244 m (801 ft)
- Population (2023): 285
  - Density: 12.9/km^{2} (33.4/sq mi)
- Time zone: UTC+01:00 (CET)
  - Summer (DST): UTC+02:00 (CEST)
- INSEE/Postal code: 21536 /21260
- ^{1} French Land Register data, which excludes lakes, ponds, glaciers > 1 km^{2} (0.386 sq mi or 247 acres) and river estuaries.

Sacquenay (French pronunciation: [saknɛ]) is a commune in the Côte-d'Or department in eastern France.

== Population ==
Historical population
Year	Pop.	±% p.a.
1968	318	—
1975	301	−0.78%
1982	276	−1.23%
1990	224	−2.58%
1999	265	+1.89%
2007	261	−0.19%
2012	263	+0.15%
2017	286	+1.69%
2023	285	−0.06%
Source: INSEE

== See also ==
- Communes of the Côte-d'Or department
