= Francheville, Côte-d'Or =

Francheville
- Commune
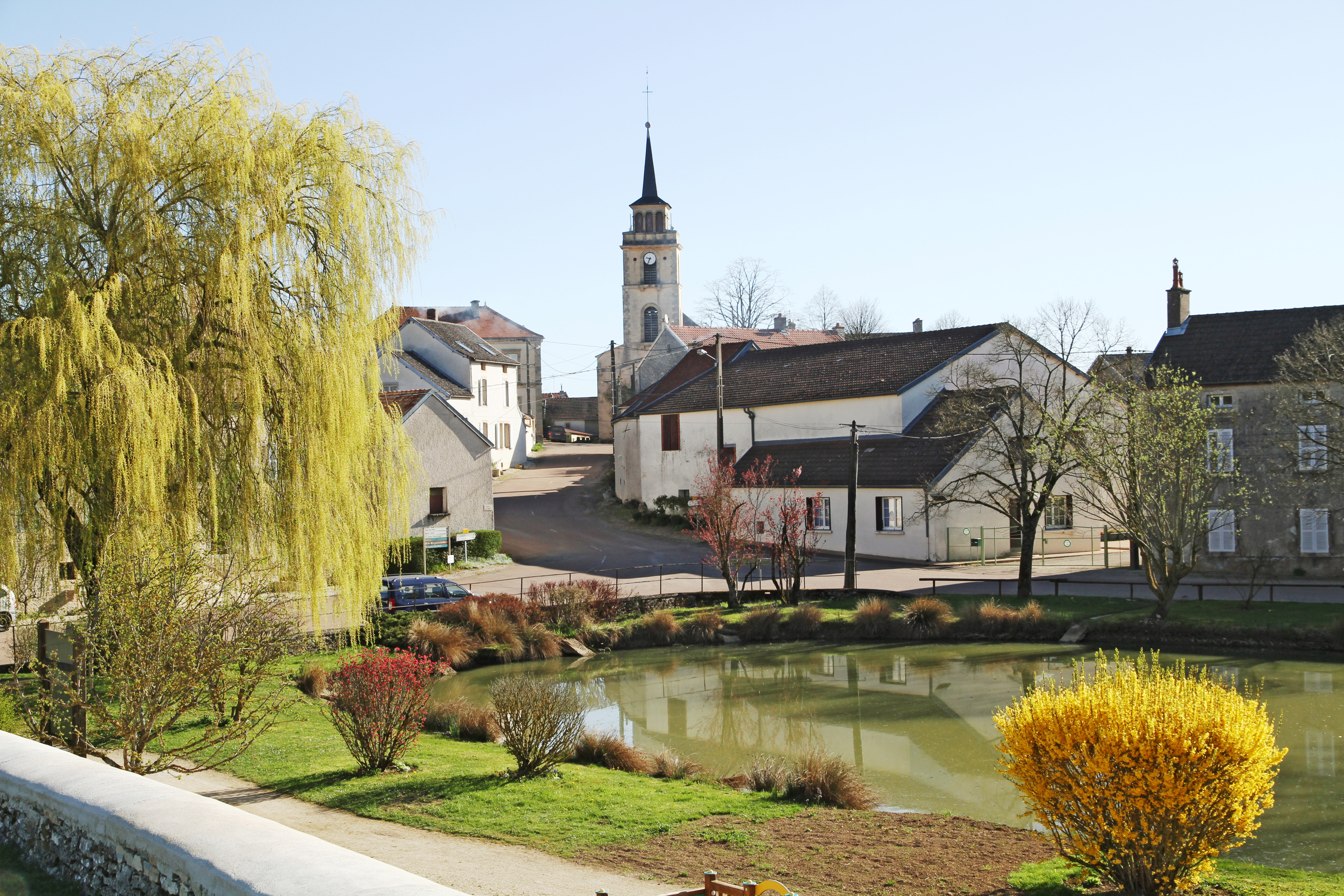
- The lake and church in the centre of the village

- Coat of arms
- Location of Francheville
- Location within France Location within Bourgogne-Franche-Comté
- Coordinates: 47°27′21″N 4°53′00″E
- Country: France
- Region: Bourgogne-Franche-Comté
- Department: Côte-d'Or
- Arrondissement: Dijon
- Canton: Is-sur-Tille

Government
  - Mayor (2020–2026): Gilles Duthu
- Area^{1}: 31.65 km^{2} (12.22 sq mi)
- Elevation: 480 m (1,570 ft)
- Highest elevation: 563 m (1,847 ft)
- Lowest elevation: 344 m (1,129 ft)
- Population (2023): 256
  - Density: 8.09/km^{2} (20.9/sq mi)
- Time zone: UTC+01:00 (CET)
  - Summer (DST): UTC+02:00 (CEST)
- INSEE/Postal code: 21284 /21440
- ^{1} French Land Register data, which excludes lakes, ponds, glaciers > 1 km^{2} (0.386 sq mi or 247 acres) and river estuaries.

Francheville (French pronunciation: [fʁɑ̃ʃvil]) is a commune in the Côte-d'Or department in eastern France.

== Population ==
Historical population
Year	Pop.	±% p.a.
1968	132	—
1975	138	+0.64%
1982	142	+0.41%
1990	205	+4.70%
1999	199	−0.33%
2007	247	+2.74%
2012	245	−0.16%
2017	285	+3.07%
2023	256	−1.77%
Source: INSEE

== See also ==
- Communes of the Côte-d'Or department
