= Spoy, Côte-d'Or =

Spoy
- Commune
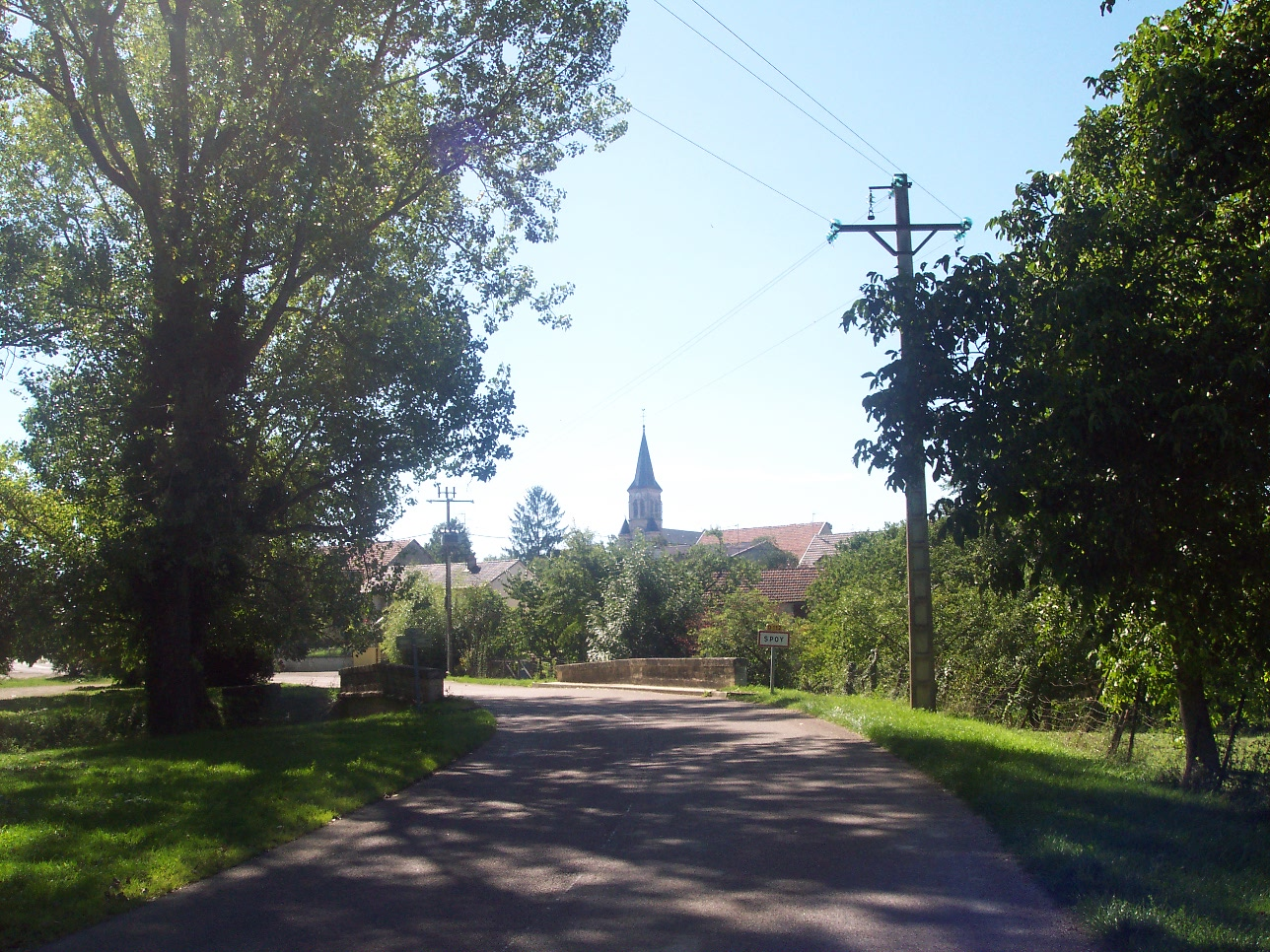
- The road into Spoy
- Location of Spoy
- Location within France Location within Bourgogne-Franche-Comté
- Coordinates: 47°26′48″N 5°11′27″E
- Country: France
- Region: Bourgogne-Franche-Comté
- Department: Côte-d'Or
- Arrondissement: Dijon
- Canton: Is-sur-Tille

Government
  - Mayor (2020–2026): Sébastien Chignardet
- Area^{1}: 12.04 km^{2} (4.65 sq mi)
- Elevation: 240 m (790 ft)
- Highest elevation: 289 m (948 ft)
- Lowest elevation: 236 m (774 ft)
- Population (2023): 386
  - Density: 32.1/km^{2} (83.0/sq mi)
- Time zone: UTC+01:00 (CET)
  - Summer (DST): UTC+02:00 (CEST)
- INSEE/Postal code: 21614 /21120
- ^{1} French Land Register data, which excludes lakes, ponds, glaciers > 1 km^{2} (0.386 sq mi or 247 acres) and river estuaries.

Spoy (French pronunciation: [spwa]) is a commune in the Côte-d'Or department in eastern France.

== Population ==
Historical population
| Year | Pop. | ±% p.a. |
|---|---|---|
| 1968 | 182 | — |
| 1975 | 191 | +0.69% |
| 1982 | 228 | +2.56% |
| 1990 | 246 | +0.95% |
| 1999 | 244 | −0.09% |
| 2007 | 290 | +2.18% |
| 2012 | 299 | +0.61% |
| 2017 | 392 | +5.57% |
| 2023 | 386 | −0.26% |
Source: INSEE

== See also ==
- Communes of the Côte-d'Or department
