= Pichanges =

- Commune
- Coat of arms
- Location of Pichanges
- Location within France Location within Bourgogne-Franche-Comté
- Coordinates: 47°27′46″N 5°09′03″E
- Country: France
- Region: Bourgogne-Franche-Comté
- Department: Côte-d'Or
- Arrondissement: Dijon
- Canton: Is-sur-Tille

Government
  - Mayor (2020–2026): Jean-Luc Pomi
- Area^{1}: 10.03 km^{2} (3.87 sq mi)
- Elevation: 350 m (1,150 ft)
- Highest elevation: 314 m (1,030 ft)
- Lowest elevation: 249 m (817 ft)
- Population (2023): 285
  - Density: 28.4/km^{2} (73.6/sq mi)
- Time zone: UTC+01:00 (CET)
  - Summer (DST): UTC+02:00 (CEST)
- INSEE/Postal code: 21483 /21120
- ^{1} French Land Register data, which excludes lakes, ponds, glaciers > 1 km^{2} (0.386 sq mi or 247 acres) and river estuaries.

Pichanges (French pronunciation: [piʃɑ̃ʒ]) is a commune in the Côte-d'Or department in eastern France.

== Population ==
Historical population
Year	Pop.	±% p.a.
1968	170	—
1975	126	−4.19%
1982	146	+2.13%
1990	211	+4.71%
1999	223	+0.62%
2007	249	+1.39%
2012	269	+1.56%
2017	293	+1.72%
2023	285	−0.46%
Source: INSEE

== See also ==
- Communes of the Côte-d'Or department
