= Cussey-les-Forges =

- Commune
- Location of Cussey-les-Forges
- Location within France Location within Bourgogne-Franche-Comté
- Coordinates: 47°38′36″N 5°04′47″E
- Country: France
- Region: Bourgogne-Franche-Comté
- Department: Côte-d'Or
- Arrondissement: Dijon
- Canton: Is-sur-Tille

Government
  - Mayor (2020–2026): Luc Minot
- Area^{1}: 23.32 km^{2} (9.00 sq mi)
- Elevation: 318 m (1,043 ft)
- Highest elevation: 472 m (1,549 ft)
- Lowest elevation: 299 m (981 ft)
- Population (2023): 144
  - Density: 6.17/km^{2} (16.0/sq mi)
- Time zone: UTC+01:00 (CET)
  - Summer (DST): UTC+02:00 (CEST)
- INSEE/Postal code: 21220 /21580
- ^{1} French Land Register data, which excludes lakes, ponds, glaciers > 1 km^{2} (0.386 sq mi or 247 acres) and river estuaries.

Cussey-les-Forges (French pronunciation: [kysɛ le fɔʁʒ]) is a commune in the Côte-d'Or department in eastern France.

== Population ==
Historical population
Year	Pop.	±% p.a.
1968	177	—
1975	128	−4.52%
1982	109	−2.27%
1990	112	+0.34%
1999	115	+0.29%
2007	133	+1.83%
2012	134	+0.15%
2017	138	+0.59%
2023	144	+0.71%
Source: INSEE

== See also ==
- Communes of the Côte-d'Or department
