= Canton of Is-sur-Tille =

Administrative division of the Côte-d'Or department, France

Coordinates: 47.52°N 5.11°E

The canton of Is-sur-Tille is an administrative division of the Côte-d'Or department, eastern France. Its borders were modified during the French canton re-organisation, which came into effect in March 2015. Its seat is in Is-sur-Tille.

It consists of the following communes:

1. Avelanges
2. Avot
3. Barjon
4. Boussenois
5. Busserotte-et-Montenaille
6. Bussières
7. Chaignay
8. Chanceaux
9. Chazeuil
10. Courlon
11. Courtivron
12. Crécey-sur-Tille
13. Cussey-les-Forges
14. Diénay
15. Échevannes
16. Épagny
17. Francheville
18. Foncegrive
19. Fraignot-et-Vesvrotte
20. Frénois
21. Gemeaux
22. Grancey-le-Château-Neuvelle
23. Is-sur-Tille
24. Lamargelle
25. Léry
26. Lux
27. Marcilly-sur-Tille
28. Marey-sur-Tille
29. Marsannay-le-Bois
30. Le Meix
31. Moloy
32. Orville
33. Pellerey
34. Pichanges
35. Poiseul-la-Grange
36. Poiseul-lès-Saulx
37. Poncey-sur-l'Ignon
38. Sacquenay
39. Salives
40. Saulx-le-Duc
41. Selongey
42. Spoy
43. Tarsul
44. Til-Châtel
45. Vaux-Saules
46. Vernois-lès-Vesvres
47. Vernot
48. Véronnes
49. Villecomte
50. Villey-sur-Tille
