= Orville, Côte-d'Or =

Orville
- Commune
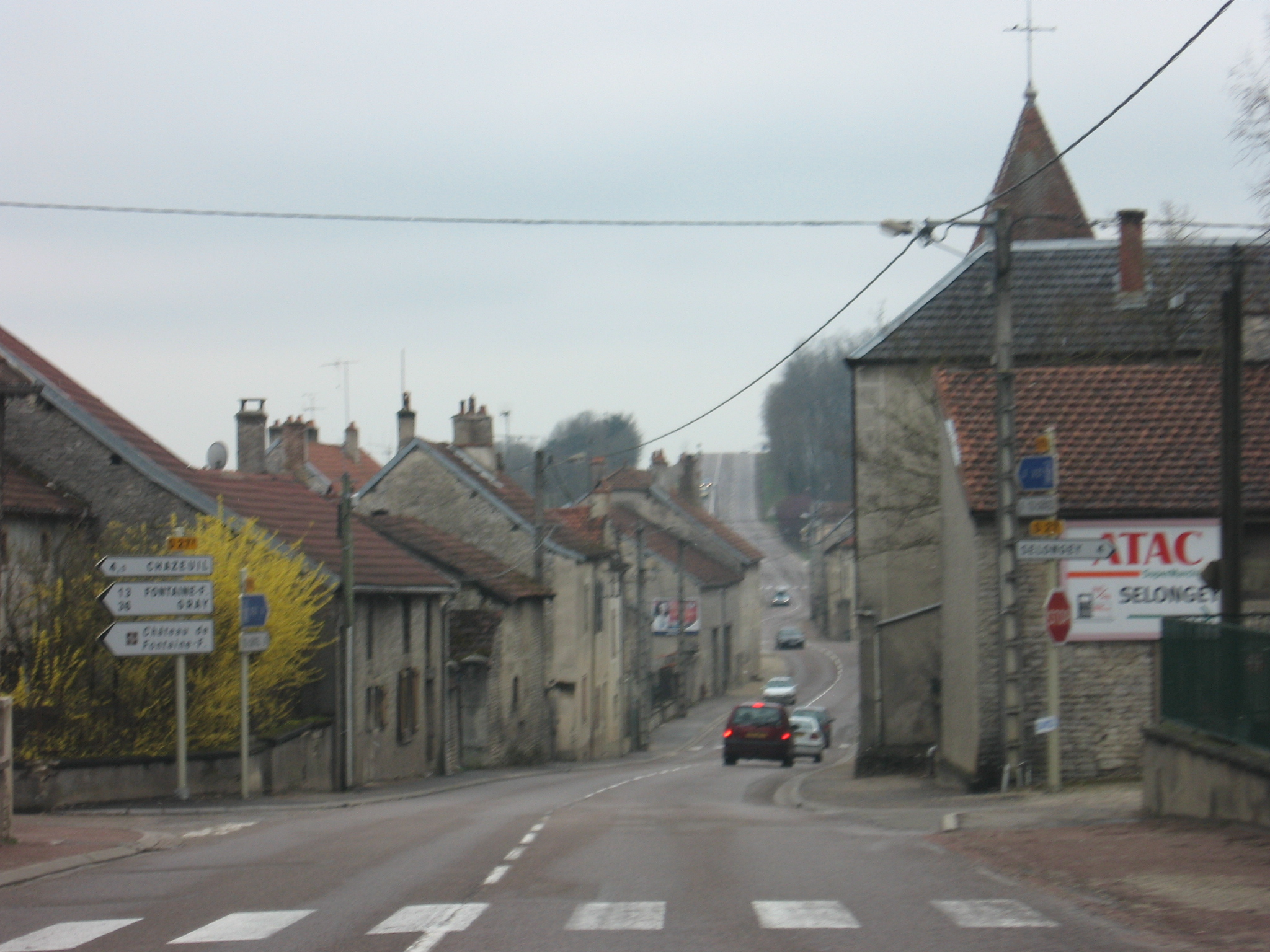
- A view within Orville
- Location of Orville
- Location within France Location within Bourgogne-Franche-Comté
- Coordinates: 47°33′50″N 5°12′47″E
- Country: France
- Region: Bourgogne-Franche-Comté
- Department: Côte-d'Or
- Arrondissement: Dijon
- Canton: Is-sur-Tille
- Intercommunality: Tille et Venelle

Government
  - Mayor (2024–2026): Jonathan Lomberget
- Area^{1}: 2.24 km^{2} (0.86 sq mi)
- Highest elevation: 330 m (1,080 ft)
- Lowest elevation: 277 m (909 ft)
- Population (2023): 184
  - Density: 82.1/km^{2} (213/sq mi)
- Time zone: UTC+01:00 (CET)
  - Summer (DST): UTC+02:00 (CEST)
- INSEE/Postal code: 21472 /21260
- ^{1} French Land Register data, which excludes lakes, ponds, glaciers > 1 km^{2} (0.386 sq mi or 247 acres) and river estuaries.

Orville (French pronunciation: [ɔʁvil]) is a commune in the Côte-d'Or department in eastern France.

== Population ==
Historical population
Year	Pop.	±% p.a.
1968	244	—
1975	255	+0.63%
1982	234	−1.22%
1990	182	−3.09%
1999	214	+1.82%
2007	198	−0.97%
2012	180	−1.89%
2017	171	−1.02%
2023	184	+1.23%
Source: INSEE

== See also ==
- Communes of the Côte-d'Or department
