= Poncey-sur-l'Ignon =

- Commune
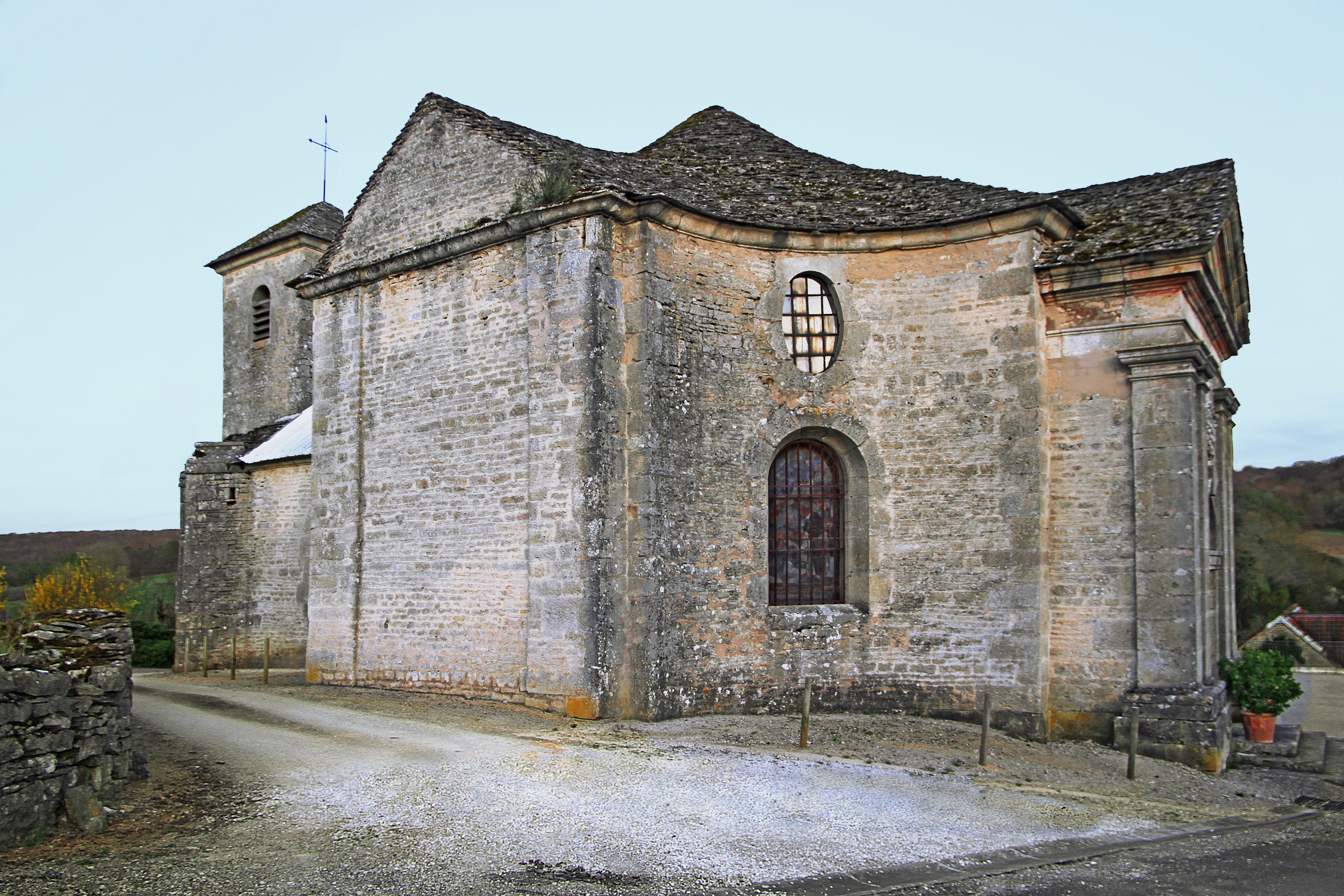
- The church in Poncey-sur-l'Ignon
- Location of Poncey-sur-l'Ignon
- Location within France Location within Bourgogne-Franche-Comté
- Coordinates: 47°29′43″N 4°45′43″E
- Country: France
- Region: Bourgogne-Franche-Comté
- Department: Côte-d'Or
- Arrondissement: Dijon
- Canton: Is-sur-Tille

Government
  - Mayor (2020–2026): Eliane Lépine
- Area^{1}: 16.35 km^{2} (6.31 sq mi)
- Elevation: 430 m (1,410 ft)
- Highest elevation: 529 m (1,736 ft)
- Lowest elevation: 383 m (1,257 ft)
- Population (2023): 80
  - Density: 4.9/km^{2} (13/sq mi)
- Time zone: UTC+01:00 (CET)
  - Summer (DST): UTC+02:00 (CEST)
- INSEE/Postal code: 21494 /21440
- ^{1} French Land Register data, which excludes lakes, ponds, glaciers > 1 km^{2} (0.386 sq mi or 247 acres) and river estuaries.

Poncey-sur-l'Ignon (French pronunciation: [pɔ̃sɛ syʁ liɲɔ̃]) is a commune in the Côte-d'Or department in eastern France.

== Population ==
Historical population
Year	Pop.	±% p.a.
1968	122	—
1975	105	−2.12%
1982	107	+0.27%
1990	66	−5.86%
1999	81	+2.30%
2007	85	+0.60%
2012	75	−2.47%
2017	78	+0.79%
2023	80	+0.42%
Source: INSEE

== See also ==
- Communes of the Côte-d'Or department
