= Marsannay-le-Bois =

- Commune
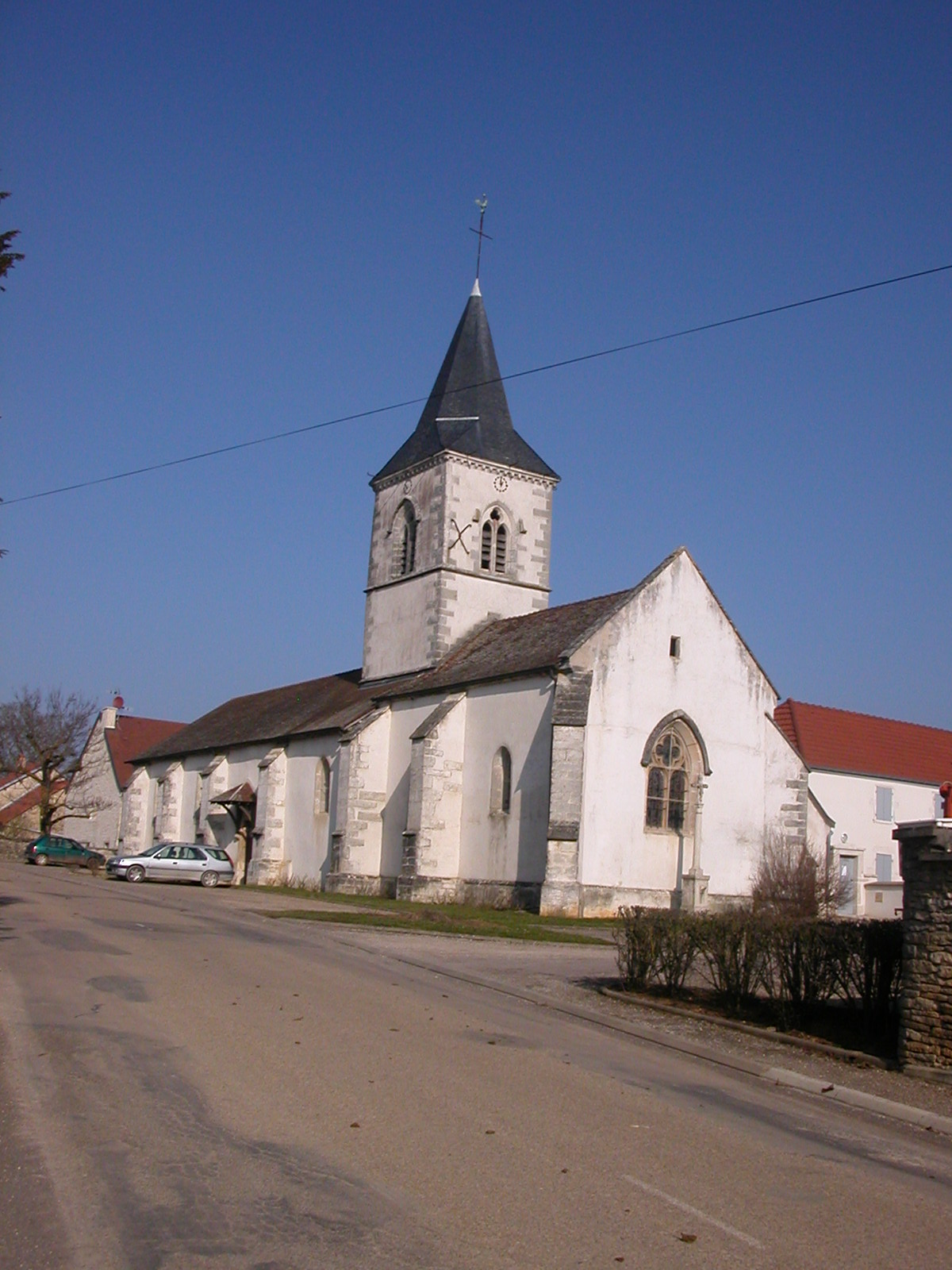
- The church in Marsannay-le-Bois

- Coat of arms
- Location of Marsannay-le-Bois
- Location within France Location within Bourgogne-Franche-Comté
- Coordinates: 47°26′26″N 5°05′45″E
- Country: France
- Region: Bourgogne-Franche-Comté
- Department: Côte-d'Or
- Arrondissement: Dijon
- Canton: Is-sur-Tille

Government
  - Mayor (2020–2026): Christophe Monot
- Area^{1}: 11.94 km^{2} (4.61 sq mi)
- Elevation: 320 m (1,050 ft)
- Highest elevation: 337 m (1,106 ft)
- Lowest elevation: 257 m (843 ft)
- Population (2023): 843
  - Density: 70.6/km^{2} (183/sq mi)
- Time zone: UTC+01:00 (CET)
  - Summer (DST): UTC+02:00 (CEST)
- INSEE/Postal code: 21391 /21380
- ^{1} French Land Register data, which excludes lakes, ponds, glaciers > 1 km^{2} (0.386 sq mi or 247 acres) and river estuaries.

Marsannay-le-Bois (French pronunciation: [maʁsanɛ lə bwa]) is a commune in the Côte-d'Or department in eastern France.

== Population ==
Historical population
Year	Pop.	±% p.a.
1968	311	—
1975	453	+5.52%
1982	522	+2.05%
1990	592	+1.59%
1999	673	+1.44%
2007	725	+0.93%
2012	823	+2.57%
2017	840	+0.41%
2023	843	+0.06%
Source: INSEE

== See also ==
- Communes of the Côte-d'Or department
