= Épagny, Côte-d'Or =

Épagny
- Commune
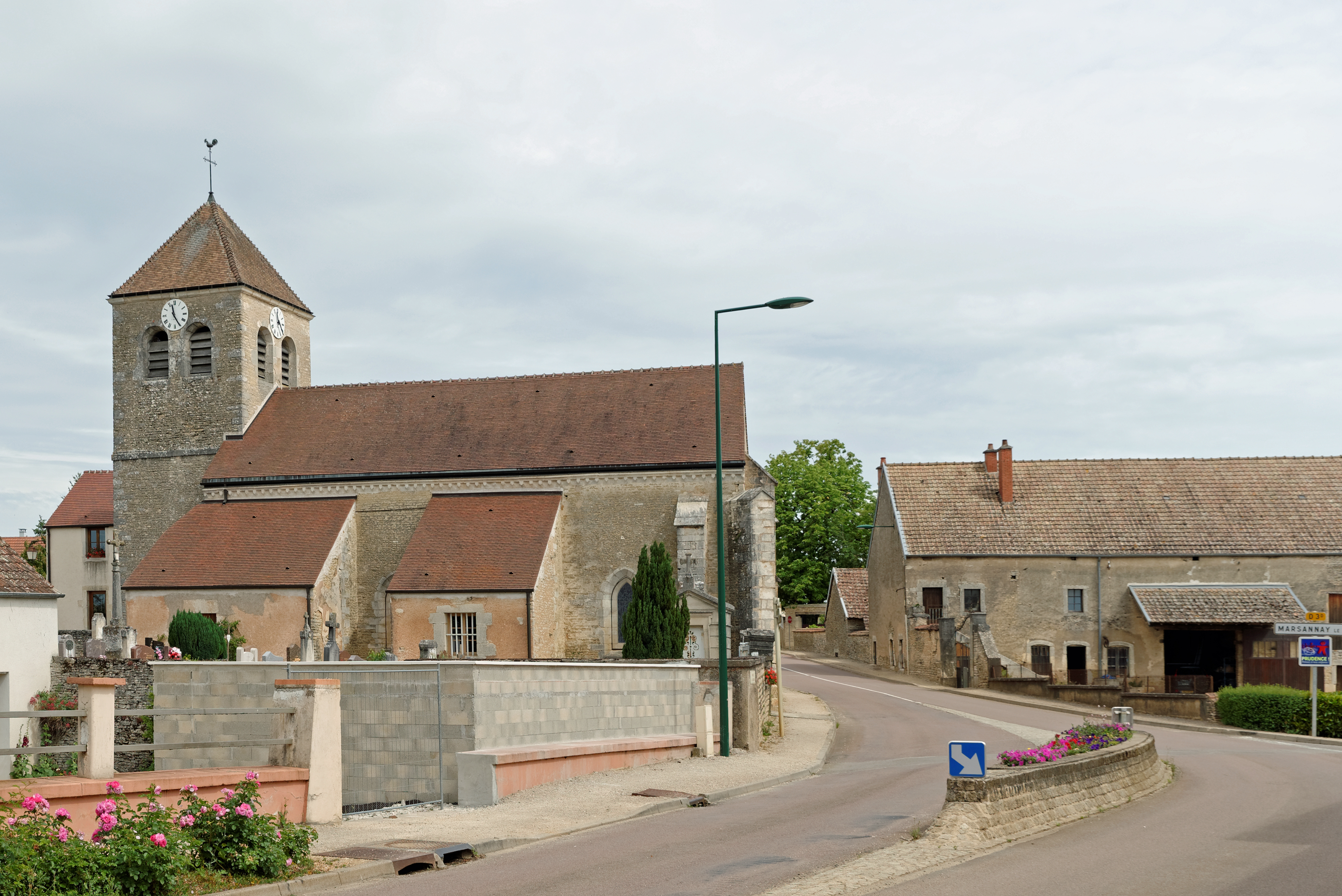
- The church in Épagny
- Location of Épagny
- Location within France Location within Bourgogne-Franche-Comté
- Coordinates: 47°26′56″N 5°03′35″E
- Country: France
- Region: Bourgogne-Franche-Comté
- Department: Côte-d'Or
- Arrondissement: Dijon
- Canton: Is-sur-Tille

Government
  - Mayor (2020–2026): Jean-Denis Staiger
- Area^{1}: 12.39 km^{2} (4.78 sq mi)
- Elevation: 317 m (1,040 ft)
- Highest elevation: 492 m (1,614 ft)
- Lowest elevation: 294 m (965 ft)
- Population (2023): 328
  - Density: 26.5/km^{2} (68.6/sq mi)
- Time zone: UTC+01:00 (CET)
  - Summer (DST): UTC+02:00 (CEST)
- INSEE/Postal code: 21245 /21380
- ^{1} French Land Register data, which excludes lakes, ponds, glaciers > 1 km^{2} (0.386 sq mi or 247 acres) and river estuaries.

Épagny (French pronunciation: [epaɲi]) is a commune in the Côte-d'Or department in eastern France.

== Population ==
Historical population
Year	Pop.	±% p.a.
1968	133	—
1975	152	+1.93%
1982	175	+2.03%
1990	217	+2.73%
1999	218	+0.05%
2007	260	+2.23%
2012	313	+3.78%
2017	313	+0.00%
2023	328	+0.78%
Source: INSEE

== See also ==
- Communes of the Côte-d'Or department
