= Fraignot-et-Vesvrotte =

- Commune
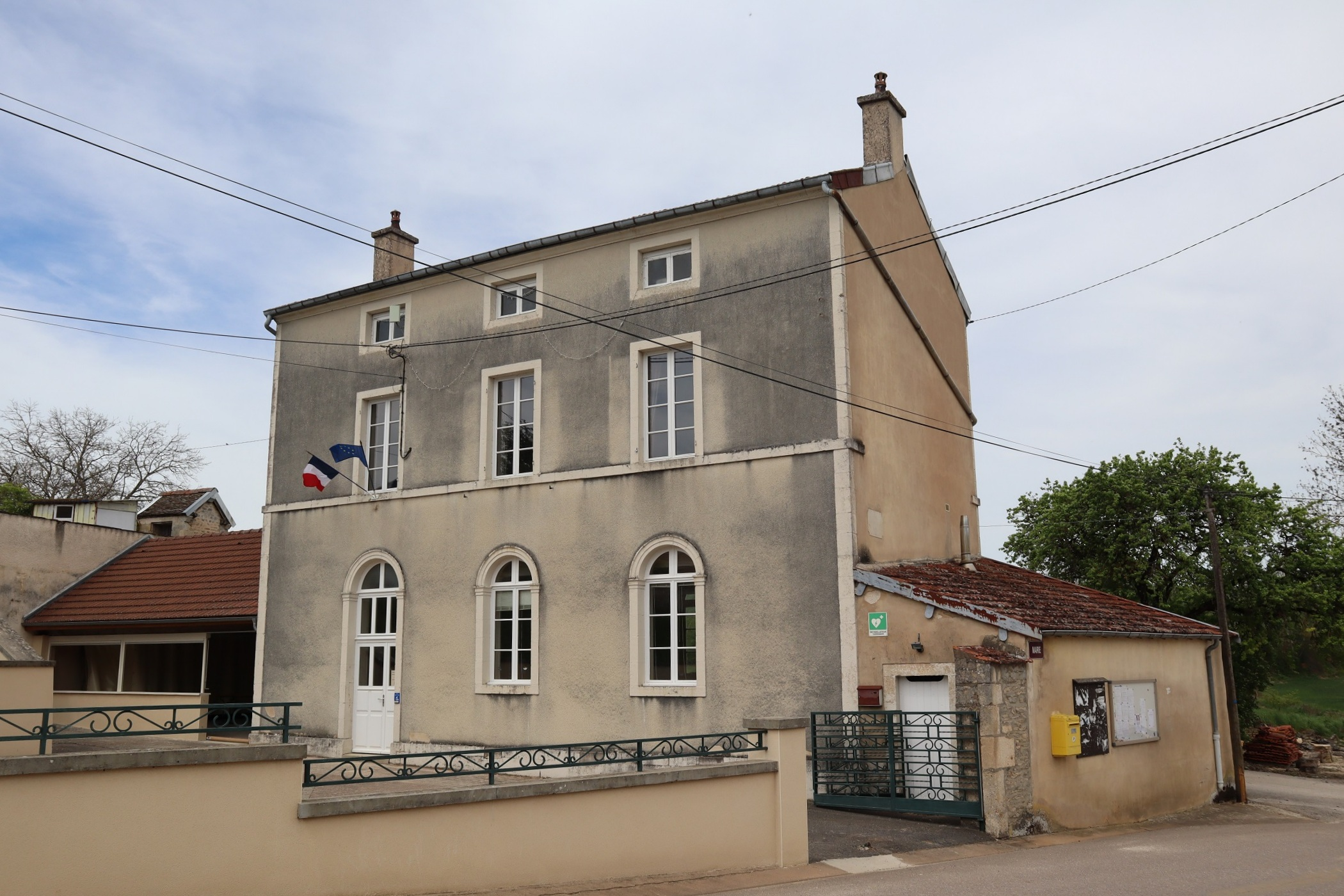
- Town hall
- Location of Fraignot-et-Vesvrotte
- Location within France Location within Bourgogne-Franche-Comté
- Coordinates: 47°39′14″N 4°56′18″E
- Country: France
- Region: Bourgogne-Franche-Comté
- Department: Côte-d'Or
- Arrondissement: Dijon
- Canton: Is-sur-Tille

Government
  - Mayor (2020–2026): Didier Thomère
- Area^{1}: 11.73 km^{2} (4.53 sq mi)
- Elevation: 435 m (1,427 ft)
- Highest elevation: 498 m (1,634 ft)
- Lowest elevation: 383 m (1,257 ft)
- Population (2023): 76
  - Density: 6.5/km^{2} (17/sq mi)
- Time zone: UTC+01:00 (CET)
  - Summer (DST): UTC+02:00 (CEST)
- INSEE/Postal code: 21283 /21580
- ^{1} French Land Register data, which excludes lakes, ponds, glaciers > 1 km^{2} (0.386 sq mi or 247 acres) and river estuaries.

Fraignot-et-Vesvrotte (French pronunciation: [fʁɛɲo e vɛvʁɔt]) is a commune in the Côte-d'Or department in eastern France.

== Population ==
Historical population
Year	Pop.	±% p.a.
1968	92	—
1975	69	−4.03%
1982	73	+0.81%
1990	76	+0.50%
1999	78	+0.29%
2007	69	−1.52%
2012	63	−1.80%
2017	62	−0.32%
2023	76	+3.45%
Source: INSEE

== See also ==
- Communes of the Côte-d'Or department
