= Busserotte-et-Montenaille =

- Commune
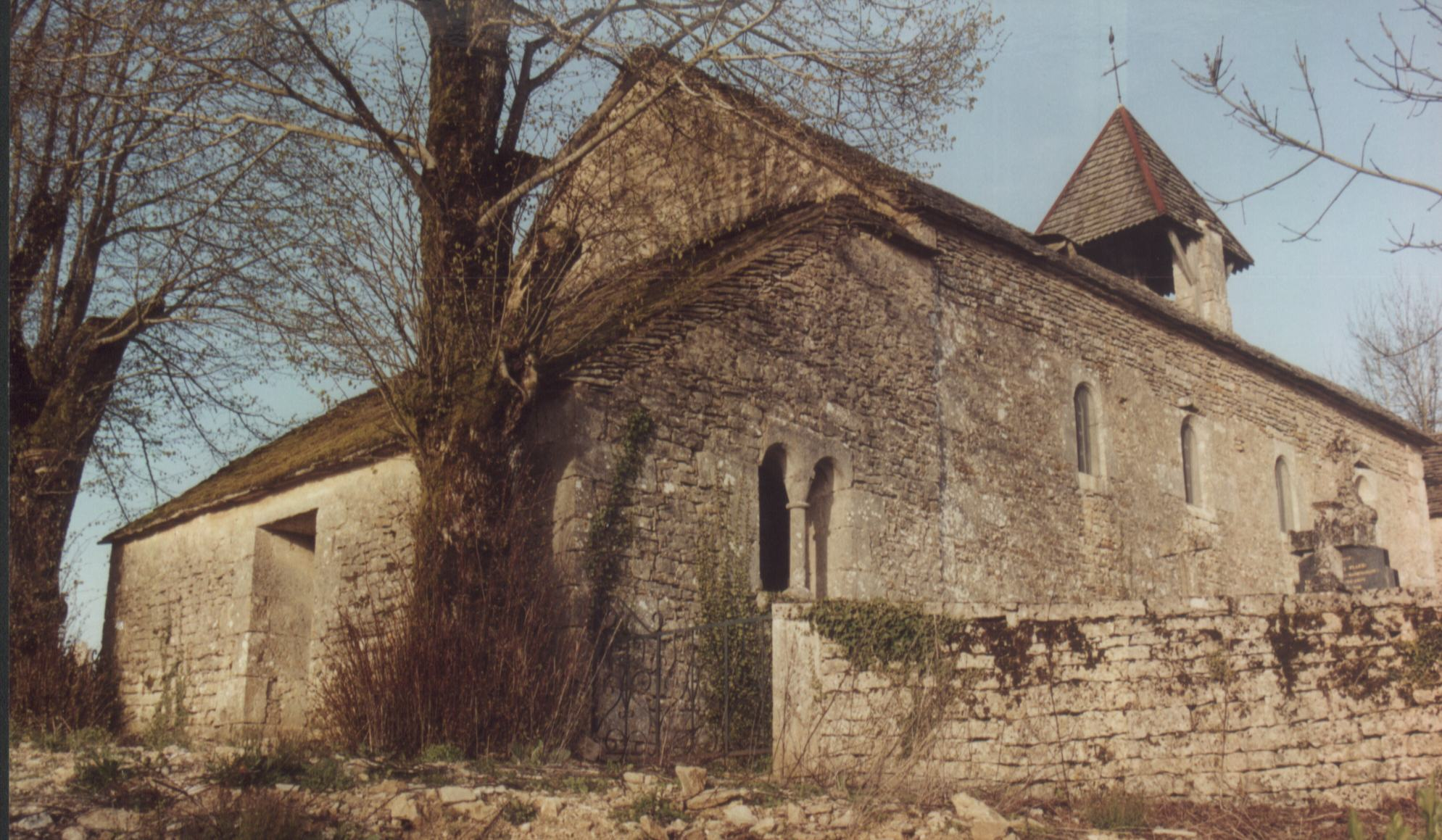
- The chapel in Busserotte-et-Montenaille
- Location of Busserotte-et-Montenaille
- Location within France Location within Bourgogne-Franche-Comté
- Coordinates: 47°39′50″N 4°58′39″E
- Country: France
- Region: Bourgogne-Franche-Comté
- Department: Côte-d'Or
- Arrondissement: Dijon
- Canton: Is-sur-Tille

Government
  - Mayor (2020–2026): Jean-Marie Mugnier
- Area^{1}: 6.56 km^{2} (2.53 sq mi)
- Elevation: 450 m (1,480 ft)
- Highest elevation: 487 m (1,598 ft)
- Lowest elevation: 359 m (1,178 ft)
- Population (2023): 33
  - Density: 5.0/km^{2} (13/sq mi)
- Time zone: UTC+01:00 (CET)
  - Summer (DST): UTC+02:00 (CEST)
- INSEE/Postal code: 21118 /21580
- ^{1} French Land Register data, which excludes lakes, ponds, glaciers > 1 km^{2} (0.386 sq mi or 247 acres) and river estuaries.

Busserotte-et-Montenaille (French pronunciation: [bysʁɔt e mɔ̃tnaj]) is a commune in the Côte-d'Or department in eastern France.

== Population ==
Historical population
| Year | Pop. | ±% p.a. |
|---|---|---|
| 1968 | 46 | — |
| 1975 | 39 | −2.33% |
| 1982 | 35 | −1.53% |
| 1990 | 33 | −0.73% |
| 1999 | 30 | −1.05% |
| 2007 | 32 | +0.81% |
| 2012 | 34 | +1.22% |
| 2017 | 24 | −6.73% |
| 2023 | 33 | +5.45% |
Source: INSEE

== See also ==
- Communes of the Côte-d'Or department
