= Pellerey =

- Commune
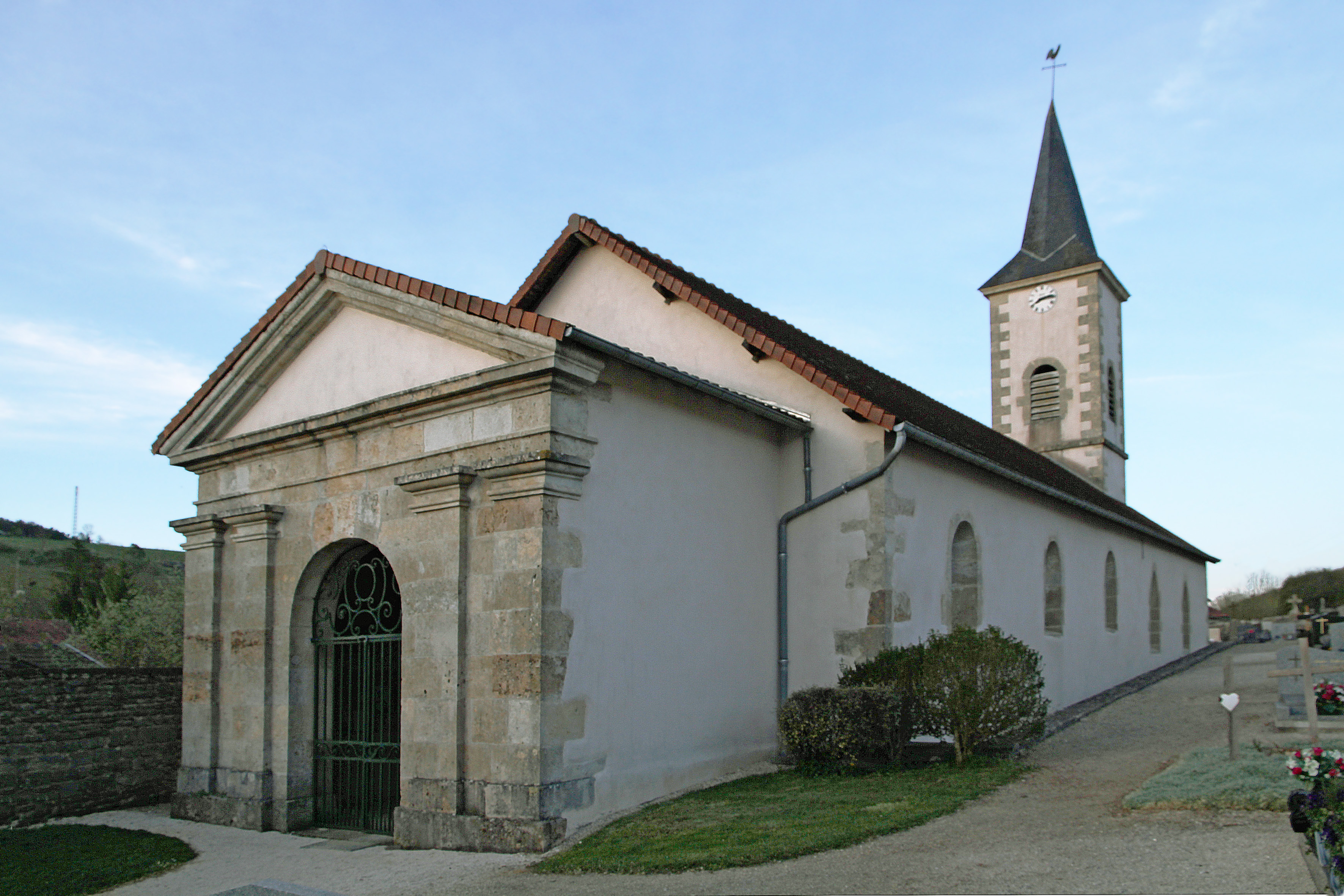
- The church in Pellerey
- Location of Pellerey
- Location within France Location within Bourgogne-Franche-Comté
- Coordinates: 47°30′21″N 4°46′59″E
- Country: France
- Region: Bourgogne-Franche-Comté
- Department: Côte-d'Or
- Arrondissement: Dijon
- Canton: Is-sur-Tille
- Intercommunality: Forêts, Seine et Suzon

Government
  - Mayor (2020–2026): Nicolas Boucherot
- Area^{1}: 12.44 km^{2} (4.80 sq mi)
- Elevation: 377 m (1,237 ft)
- Highest elevation: 510 m (1,670 ft)
- Lowest elevation: 357 m (1,171 ft)
- Population (2023): 79
  - Density: 6.4/km^{2} (16/sq mi)
- Time zone: UTC+01:00 (CET)
  - Summer (DST): UTC+02:00 (CEST)
- INSEE/Postal code: 21479 /21440
- ^{1} French Land Register data, which excludes lakes, ponds, glaciers > 1 km^{2} (0.386 sq mi or 247 acres) and river estuaries.

Pellerey (French pronunciation: [pɛlʁɛ]) is a commune in the Côte-d'Or department and Bourgogne-Franche-Comté region of eastern France.

== Population ==
Historical population
Year	Pop.	±% p.a.
1968	117	—
1975	115	−0.25%
1982	113	−0.25%
1990	106	−0.80%
1999	103	−0.32%
2007	100	−0.37%
2012	84	−3.43%
2017	105	+4.56%
2023	79	−4.63%
Source: INSEE

== See also ==
- Communes of the Côte-d'Or department
