= Vaux-Saules =

- Commune
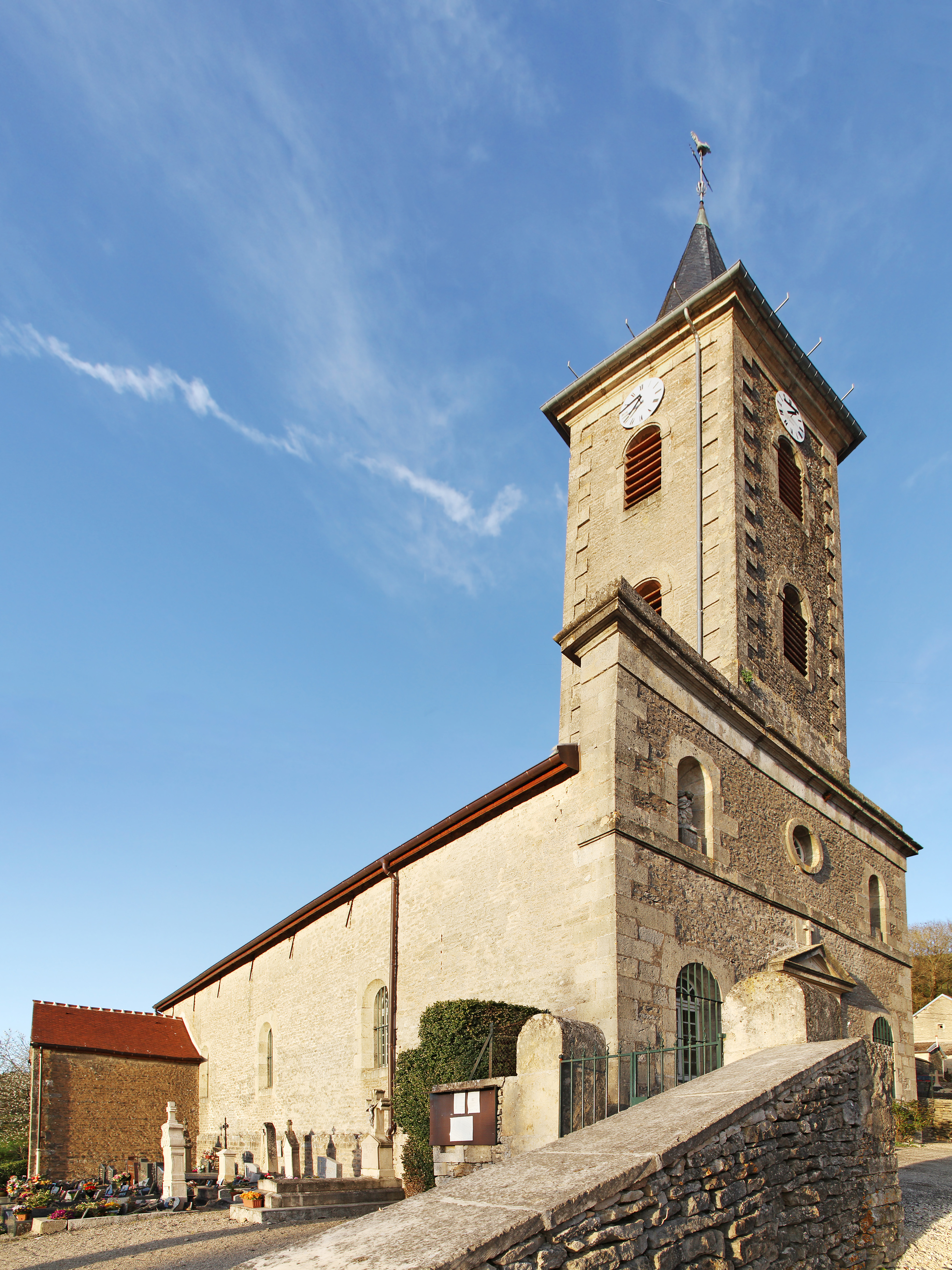
- The church in Vaux-Saules
- Location of Vaux-Saules
- Location within France Location within Bourgogne-Franche-Comté
- Coordinates: 47°28′02″N 4°48′18″E
- Country: France
- Region: Bourgogne-Franche-Comté
- Department: Côte-d'Or
- Arrondissement: Dijon
- Canton: Is-sur-Tille

Government
  - Mayor (2021–2026): Patrick Boyon
- Area^{1}: 27.89 km^{2} (10.77 sq mi)
- Elevation: 540 m (1,770 ft)
- Highest elevation: 581 m (1,906 ft)
- Lowest elevation: 375 m (1,230 ft)
- Population (2023): 170
  - Density: 6.1/km^{2} (16/sq mi)
- Time zone: UTC+01:00 (CET)
  - Summer (DST): UTC+02:00 (CEST)
- INSEE/Postal code: 21659 /21440
- ^{1} French Land Register data, which excludes lakes, ponds, glaciers > 1 km^{2} (0.386 sq mi or 247 acres) and river estuaries.

Vaux-Saules (French pronunciation: [vo sol]) is a commune in the Côte-d'Or department in eastern France.

== Population ==
Historical population
Year	Pop.	±% p.a.
1968	150	—
1975	128	−2.24%
1982	105	−2.79%
1990	111	+0.70%
1999	133	+2.03%
2007	161	+2.42%
2012	184	+2.71%
2017	168	−1.80%
2023	170	+0.20%
Source: INSEE

== See also ==
- Communes of the Côte-d'Or department
