= Saulx-le-Duc =

- Commune
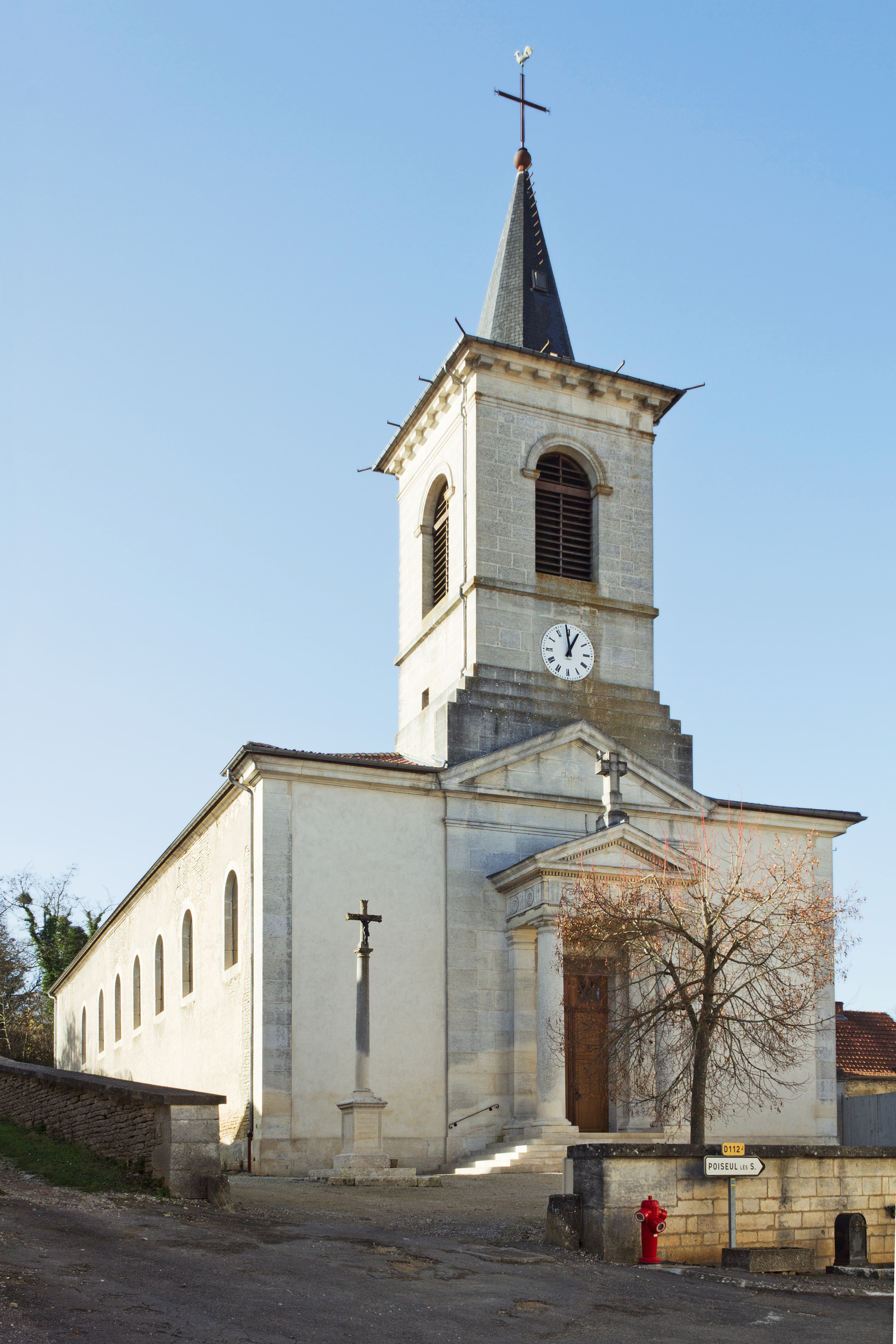
- The church in Saulx-le-Duc
- Location of Saulx-le-Duc
- Location within France Location within Bourgogne-Franche-Comté
- Coordinates: 47°32′24″N 5°01′13″E
- Country: France
- Region: Bourgogne-Franche-Comté
- Department: Côte-d'Or
- Arrondissement: Dijon
- Canton: Is-sur-Tille

Government
  - Mayor (2020–2026): Francis Perderiset
- Area^{1}: 29.08 km^{2} (11.23 sq mi)
- Elevation: 448 m (1,470 ft)
- Highest elevation: 480 m (1,570 ft)
- Lowest elevation: 292 m (958 ft)
- Population (2023): 246
  - Density: 8.46/km^{2} (21.9/sq mi)
- Time zone: UTC+01:00 (CET)
  - Summer (DST): UTC+02:00 (CEST)
- INSEE/Postal code: 21587 /21120
- ^{1} French Land Register data, which excludes lakes, ponds, glaciers > 1 km^{2} (0.386 sq mi or 247 acres) and river estuaries.

Saulx-le-Duc (French pronunciation: [so lə dyk]) is a commune in the Côte-d'Or department in eastern France.

== Population ==
Historical population
Year	Pop.	±% p.a.
1968	211	—
1975	213	+0.13%
1982	244	+1.96%
1990	201	−2.39%
1999	187	−0.80%
2007	257	+4.05%
2012	278	+1.58%
2017	239	−2.98%
2023	246	+0.48%
Source: INSEE

== See also ==
- Communes of the Côte-d'Or department
