= Frénois, Côte-d'Or =

Frénois
- Commune
- Location of Frénois
- Location within France Location within Bourgogne-Franche-Comté
- Coordinates: 47°31′50″N 4°53′32″E
- Country: France
- Region: Bourgogne-Franche-Comté
- Department: Côte-d'Or
- Arrondissement: Dijon
- Canton: Is-sur-Tille

Government
  - Mayor (2020–2026): Bénigne Colson
- Area^{1}: 21.96 km^{2} (8.48 sq mi)
- Elevation: 350 m (1,150 ft)
- Highest elevation: 527 m (1,729 ft)
- Lowest elevation: 322 m (1,056 ft)
- Population (2023): 96
  - Density: 4.4/km^{2} (11/sq mi)
- Time zone: UTC+01:00 (CET)
  - Summer (DST): UTC+02:00 (CEST)
- INSEE/Postal code: 21286 /21120
- ^{1} French Land Register data, which excludes lakes, ponds, glaciers > 1 km^{2} (0.386 sq mi or 247 acres) and river estuaries.

Frénois (French pronunciation: [fʁenwa]) is a commune in the Côte-d'Or department in eastern France.

== Population ==
Historical population
Year	Pop.	±% p.a.
1968	65	—
1975	40	−6.70%
1982	58	+5.45%
1990	51	−1.59%
1999	65	+2.73%
2007	71	+1.11%
2012	92	+5.32%
2017	85	−1.57%
2023	96	+2.05%
Source: INSEE

== See also ==
- Communes of the Côte-d'Or department
