= Perrigny =

Perrigny is the name or part of the name of several communes in France:

- Perrigny, Jura, in the Jura département
- Perrigny, Yonne, in the Yonne département
- Perrigny-lès-Dijon, in the Côte-d'Or département
- Perrigny-sur-Armançon, in the Yonne département
- Perrigny-sur-l'Ognon, in the Côte-d'Or département
- Perrigny-sur-Loire, in the Saône-et-Loire département

== See also ==
- SS Perrigny, a French collier in service 1947-62
- Périgny (disambiguation)
