= Arrondissement of Dijon =

Coordinates: 47°19′18″N 5°02′29″E

Dijon
- Arrondissement
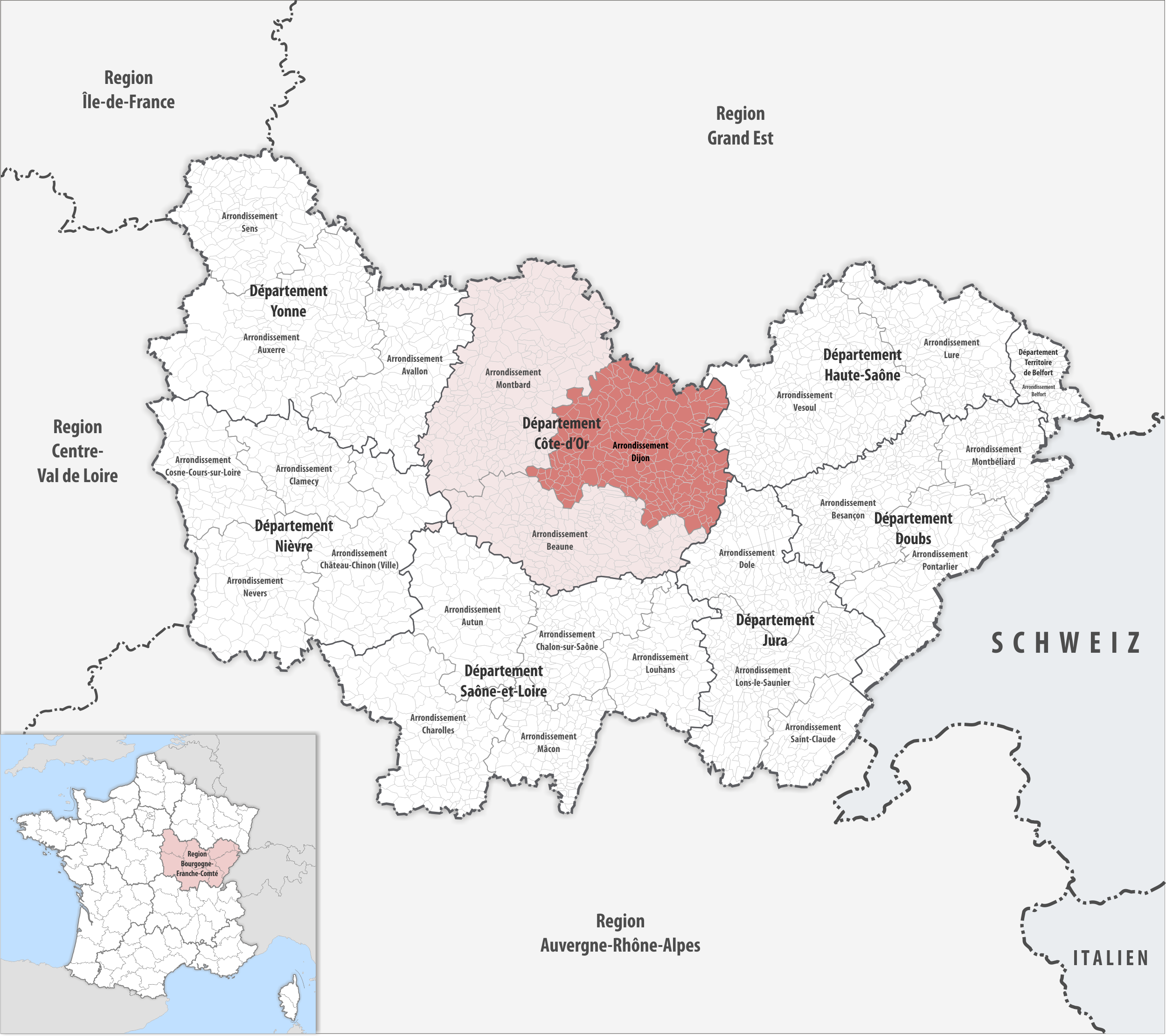
- Location within the region Bourgogne-Franche-Comté
- Country: France
- Region: Bourgogne-Franche-Comté
- Department: Côte-d'Or
- No. of communes: {{{nbcomm}}}
- Area: 2,808.2 km^{2} (1,084.3 sq mi)
- Population (2023): 373,323
  - Density: 132.94/km^{2} (344.31/sq mi)
- INSEE code: 212

The arrondissement of Dijon is an arrondissement of France in the Côte-d'Or department in the Bourgogne-Franche-Comté region. It has 224 communes. Its population is 368,440 (2021), and its area is 2,808.2 km^{2} (1,084.3 sq mi).

== Composition ==
The communes of the arrondissement of Dijon, and their INSEE codes, are:

1. Agey (21002)
2. Ahuy (21003)
3. Aiserey (21005)
4. Ancey (21013)
5. Arceau (21016)
6. Arcey (21018)
7. Arc-sur-Tille (21021)
8. Asnières-lès-Dijon (21027)
9. Athée (21028)
10. Aubigny-lès-Sombernon (21033)
11. Auxonne (21038)
12. Avelanges (21039)
13. Avot (21041)
14. Barbirey-sur-Ouche (21045)
15. Barjon (21049)
16. Baulme-la-Roche (21051)
17. Beaumont-sur-Vingeanne (21053)
18. Beire-le-Châtel (21056)
19. Beire-le-Fort (21057)
20. Bellefond (21059)
21. Belleneuve (21060)
22. Bessey-lès-Cîteaux (21067)
23. Bèze (21071)
24. Bézouotte (21072)
25. Billey (21074)
26. Binges (21076)
27. Blagny-sur-Vingeanne (21079)
28. Blaisy-Bas (21080)
29. Blaisy-Haut (21081)
30. Bligny-le-Sec (21085)
31. Bourberain (21094)
32. Boussenois (21096)
33. Bressey-sur-Tille (21105)
34. Bretenière (21106)
35. Bretigny (21107)
36. Brognon (21111)
37. Busserotte-et-Montenaille (21118)
38. Bussières (21119)
39. Bussy-la-Pesle (21121)
40. Cessey-sur-Tille (21126)
41. Chaignay (21127)
42. Chambeire (21130)
43. Champagne-sur-Vingeanne (21135)
44. Champagny (21136)
45. Champdôtre (21138)
46. Chanceaux (21142)
47. Charmes (21146)
48. Chaume-et-Courchamp (21158)
49. Chazeuil (21163)
50. Chenôve (21166)
51. Cheuge (21167)
52. Chevigny-Saint-Sauveur (21171)
53. Cirey-lès-Pontailler (21175)
54. Clénay (21179)
55. Cléry (21180)
56. Collonges-et-Premières (21183)
57. Corcelles-les-Monts (21192)
58. Courlon (21207)
59. Courtivron (21208)
60. Couternon (21209)
61. Crécey-sur-Tille (21211)
62. Cuiserey (21215)
63. Curtil-Saint-Seine (21218)
64. Cussey-les-Forges (21220)
65. Daix (21223)
66. Dampierre-et-Flée (21225)
67. Darois (21227)
68. Diénay (21230)
69. Dijon (21231)
70. Drambon (21233)
71. Drée (21234)
72. Échannay (21238)
73. Échevannes (21240)
74. Échigey (21242)
75. Épagny (21245)
76. Étaules (21255)
77. Étevaux (21256)
78. Fauverney (21261)
79. Fénay (21263)
80. Flacey (21266)
81. Flagey-lès-Auxonne (21268)
82. Flammerans (21269)
83. Flavignerot (21270)
84. Fleurey-sur-Ouche (21273)
85. Foncegrive (21275)
86. Fontaine-Française (21277)
87. Fontaine-lès-Dijon (21278)
88. Fontenelle (21281)
89. Fraignot-et-Vesvrotte (21283)
90. Francheville (21284)
91. Frénois (21286)
92. Gemeaux (21290)
93. Genlis (21292)
94. Gergueil (21293)
95. Gissey-sur-Ouche (21300)
96. Grancey-le-Château-Neuvelle (21304)
97. Grenant-lès-Sombernon (21306)
98. Grosbois-en-Montagne (21310)
99. Hauteville-lès-Dijon (21315)
100. Heuilley-sur-Saône (21316)
101. Is-sur-Tille (21317)
102. Izeure (21319)
103. Izier (21320)
104. Jancigny (21323)
105. Labergement-Foigney (21330)
106. Labergement-lès-Auxonne (21331)
107. Lamarche-sur-Saône (21337)
108. Lamargelle (21338)
109. Lantenay (21339)
110. Léry (21345)
111. Licey-sur-Vingeanne (21348)
112. Longchamp (21351)
113. Longeault-Pluvault (21352)
114. Longecourt-en-Plaine (21353)
115. Longvic (21355)
116. Lux (21361)
117. Magny-Montarlot (21367)
118. Magny-Saint-Médard (21369)
119. Magny-sur-Tille (21370)
120. Les Maillys (21371)
121. Mâlain (21373)
122. Marandeuil (21376)
123. Marcilly-sur-Tille (21383)
124. Marey-sur-Tille (21385)
125. Marliens (21388)
126. Marsannay-la-Côte (21390)
127. Marsannay-le-Bois (21391)
128. Maxilly-sur-Saône (21398)
129. Le Meix (21400)
130. Mesmont (21406)
131. Messigny-et-Vantoux (21408)
132. Mirebeau-sur-Bèze (21416)
133. Moloy (21421)
134. Montigny-Mornay-Villeneuve-sur-Vingeanne (21433)
135. Montmançon (21437)
136. Montoillot (21439)
137. Neuilly-Crimolois (21452)
138. Noiron-sur-Bèze (21459)
139. Norges-la-Ville (21462)
140. Oisilly (21467)
141. Orain (21468)
142. Orgeux (21469)
143. Orville (21472)
144. Ouges (21473)
145. Panges (21477)
146. Pasques (21478)
147. Pellerey (21479)
148. Perrigny-lès-Dijon (21481)
149. Perrigny-sur-l'Ognon (21482)
150. Pichanges (21483)
151. Plombières-lès-Dijon (21485)
152. Pluvet (21487)
153. Poiseul-la-Grange (21489)
154. Poiseul-lès-Saulx (21491)
155. Poncey-lès-Athée (21493)
156. Poncey-sur-l'Ignon (21494)
157. Pont (21495)
158. Pontailler-sur-Saône (21496)
159. Pouilly-sur-Vingeanne (21503)
160. Prâlon (21504)
161. Prenois (21508)
162. Quetigny (21515)
163. Remilly-en-Montagne (21520)
164. Remilly-sur-Tille (21521)
165. Renève (21522)
166. Rouvres-en-Plaine (21532)
167. Ruffey-lès-Echirey (21535)
168. Sacquenay (21536)
169. Saint-Anthot (21539)
170. Saint-Apollinaire (21540)
171. Sainte-Marie-sur-Ouche (21559)
172. Saint-Jean-de-Bœuf (21553)
173. Saint-Julien (21555)
174. Saint-Léger-Triey (21556)
175. Saint-Martin-du-Mont (21561)
176. Saint-Maurice-sur-Vingeanne (21562)
177. Saint-Sauveur (21571)
178. Saint-Seine-l'Abbaye (21573)
179. Saint-Seine-sur-Vingeanne (21574)
180. Saint-Victor-sur-Ouche (21578)
181. Salives (21579)
182. Saulx-le-Duc (21587)
183. Saussy (21589)
184. Savigny-le-Sec (21591)
185. Savigny-sous-Mâlain (21592)
186. Savolles (21595)
187. Selongey (21599)
188. Sennecey-lès-Dijon (21605)
189. Soirans (21609)
190. Soissons-sur-Nacey (21610)
191. Sombernon (21611)
192. Spoy (21614)
193. Talant (21617)
194. Talmay (21618)
195. Tanay (21619)
196. Tarsul (21620)
197. Tart (21623)
198. Tart-le-Bas (21622)
199. Tellecey (21624)
200. Thorey-en-Plaine (21632)
201. Til-Châtel (21638)
202. Tillenay (21639)
203. Tréclun (21643)
204. Trochères (21644)
205. Trouhaut (21646)
206. Turcey (21648)
207. Val-Suzon (21651)
208. Varanges (21656)
209. Varois-et-Chaignot (21657)
210. Vaux-Saules (21659)
211. Velars-sur-Ouche (21661)
212. Vernois-lès-Vesvres (21665)
213. Vernot (21666)
214. Véronnes (21667)
215. Verrey-sous-Drée (21669)
216. Vieilmoulin (21679)
217. Vielverge (21680)
218. Viévigne (21682)
219. Villecomte (21692)
220. Villers-les-Pots (21699)
221. Villers-Rotin (21701)
222. Villey-sur-Tille (21702)
223. Villotte-Saint-Seine (21705)
224. Vonges (21713)

== History ==
The arrondissement of Dijon was created in 1800. At the January 2017 reorganisation of the arrondissements of Côte-d'Or, it lost 31 communes to the arrondissement of Beaune.

As a result of the reorganisation of the cantons of France which came into effect in 2015, the borders of the cantons are no longer related to the borders of the arrondissements. The cantons of the arrondissement of Dijon were, as of January 2015:

1. Auxonne
2. Chenôve
3. Dijon-1
4. Dijon-2
5. Dijon-3
6. Dijon-4
7. Dijon-5
8. Dijon-6
9. Dijon-7
10. Dijon-8
11. Fontaine-Française
12. Fontaine-lès-Dijon
13. Genlis
14. Gevrey-Chambertin
15. Grancey-le-Château-Neuvelle
16. Is-sur-Tille
17. Mirebeau-sur-Bèze
18. Pontailler-sur-Saône
19. Saint-Seine-l'Abbaye
20. Selongey
21. Sombernon
