= Flagey =

Flagey may refer to:

== Places ==
- Flagey Square, a square in Ixelles, Brussels, Belgium
  - Flagey Building, or Le Flagey, a cultural institution on Flagey Square, Brussels
- Flagey, Doubs, a commune in the department of Doubs, France
- Flagey, Haute-Marne, a commune in the department of Haute-Marne, France
- Flagey-Echézeaux, a commune in the department of Côte-d'Or, France
- Flagey-lès-Auxonne, a commune in the department of Côte-d'Or, France
- Flagey-Rigney, a commune in the department of Doubs, France

== People ==
- Camille Flagey (1837-1898), lichenologist
- Eugène Flagey, a Belgian lawyer and politician after whom Flagey Square is named
