= Cirey-lès-Pontailler =

- Commune
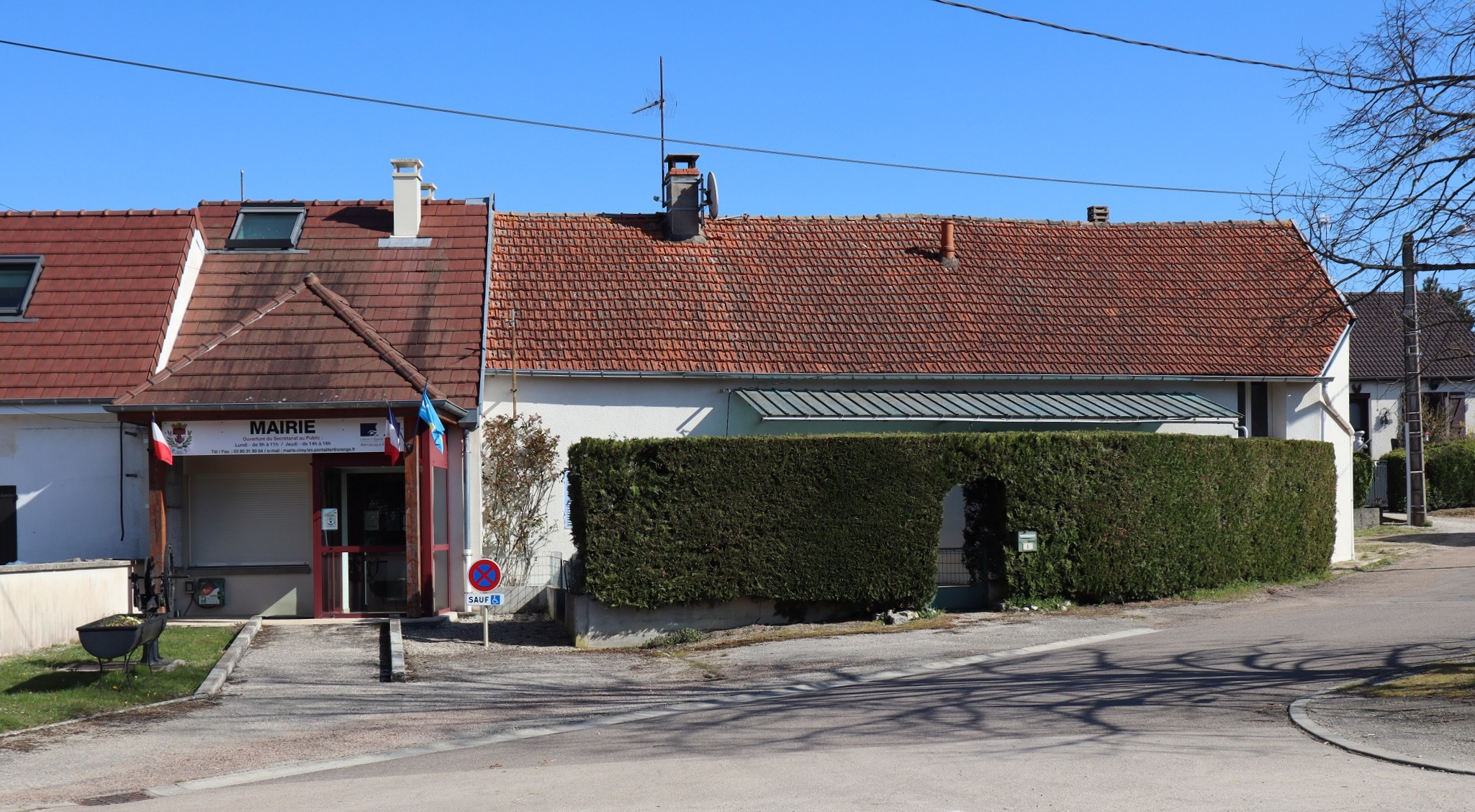
- Town hall

- Coat of arms
- Location of Cirey-lès-Pontailler
- Location within France Location within Bourgogne-Franche-Comté
- Coordinates: 47°18′35″N 5°17′46″E
- Country: France
- Region: Bourgogne-Franche-Comté
- Department: Côte-d'Or
- Arrondissement: Dijon
- Canton: Auxonne

Government
  - Mayor (2023–2026): Thierry Rolland
- Area^{1}: 8.79 km^{2} (3.39 sq mi)
- Elevation: 204 m (669 ft)
- Highest elevation: 241 m (791 ft)
- Lowest elevation: 188 m (617 ft)
- Population (2023): 181
  - Density: 20.6/km^{2} (53.3/sq mi)
- Time zone: UTC+01:00 (CET)
  - Summer (DST): UTC+02:00 (CEST)
- INSEE/Postal code: 21175 /21270
- ^{1} French Land Register data, which excludes lakes, ponds, glaciers > 1 km^{2} (0.386 sq mi or 247 acres) and river estuaries.

Cirey-lès-Pontailler (French pronunciation: [siʁɛ lɛ pɔ̃taje], literally Cirey near Pontailler) is a commune in the Côte-d'Or department in eastern France.

== Population ==
Historical population
Year	Pop.	±% p.a.
1968	76	—
1975	66	−2.00%
1982	65	−0.22%
1990	93	+4.58%
1999	115	+2.39%
2007	123	+0.84%
2012	146	+3.49%
2017	206	+7.13%
2023	181	−2.13%
Source: INSEE

== See also ==
- Communes of the Côte-d'Or department
