= Soissons-sur-Nacey =

- Commune
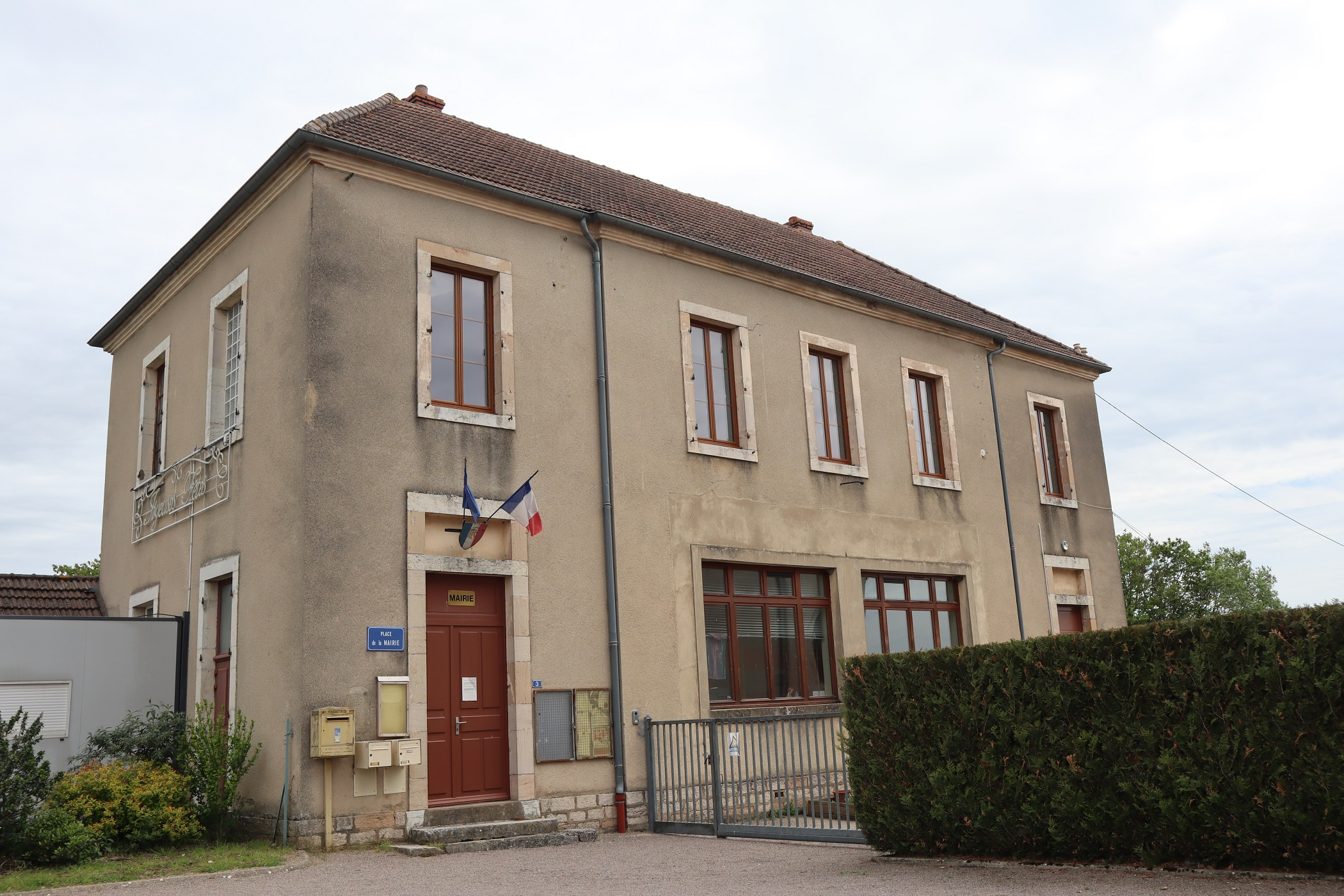
- Town hall

- Coat of arms
- Location of Soissons-sur-Nacey
- Location within France Location within Bourgogne-Franche-Comté
- Coordinates: 47°15′34″N 5°27′24″E
- Country: France
- Region: Bourgogne-Franche-Comté
- Department: Côte-d'Or
- Arrondissement: Dijon
- Canton: Auxonne

Government
  - Mayor (2020–2026): Gabriel Deloge
- Area^{1}: 7.72 km^{2} (2.98 sq mi)
- Elevation: 117 m (384 ft)
- Highest elevation: 208 m (682 ft)
- Lowest elevation: 181 m (594 ft)
- Population (2023): 355
  - Density: 46.0/km^{2} (119/sq mi)
- Time zone: UTC+01:00 (CET)
  - Summer (DST): UTC+02:00 (CEST)
- INSEE/Postal code: 21610 /21270
- ^{1} French Land Register data, which excludes lakes, ponds, glaciers > 1 km^{2} (0.386 sq mi or 247 acres) and river estuaries.

Soissons-sur-Nacey (French pronunciation: [swasɔ̃ syʁ nasɛ]) is a commune in the Côte-d'Or department in eastern France.

== Population ==
Historical population
Year	Pop.	±% p.a.
1968	199	—
1975	212	+0.91%
1982	221	+0.60%
1990	216	−0.29%
1999	259	+2.04%
2007	303	+1.98%
2012	350	+2.93%
2017	360	+0.57%
2023	355	−0.23%
Source: INSEE

== See also ==
- Communes of the Côte-d'Or department
