= Lamarche-sur-Saône =

- Commune
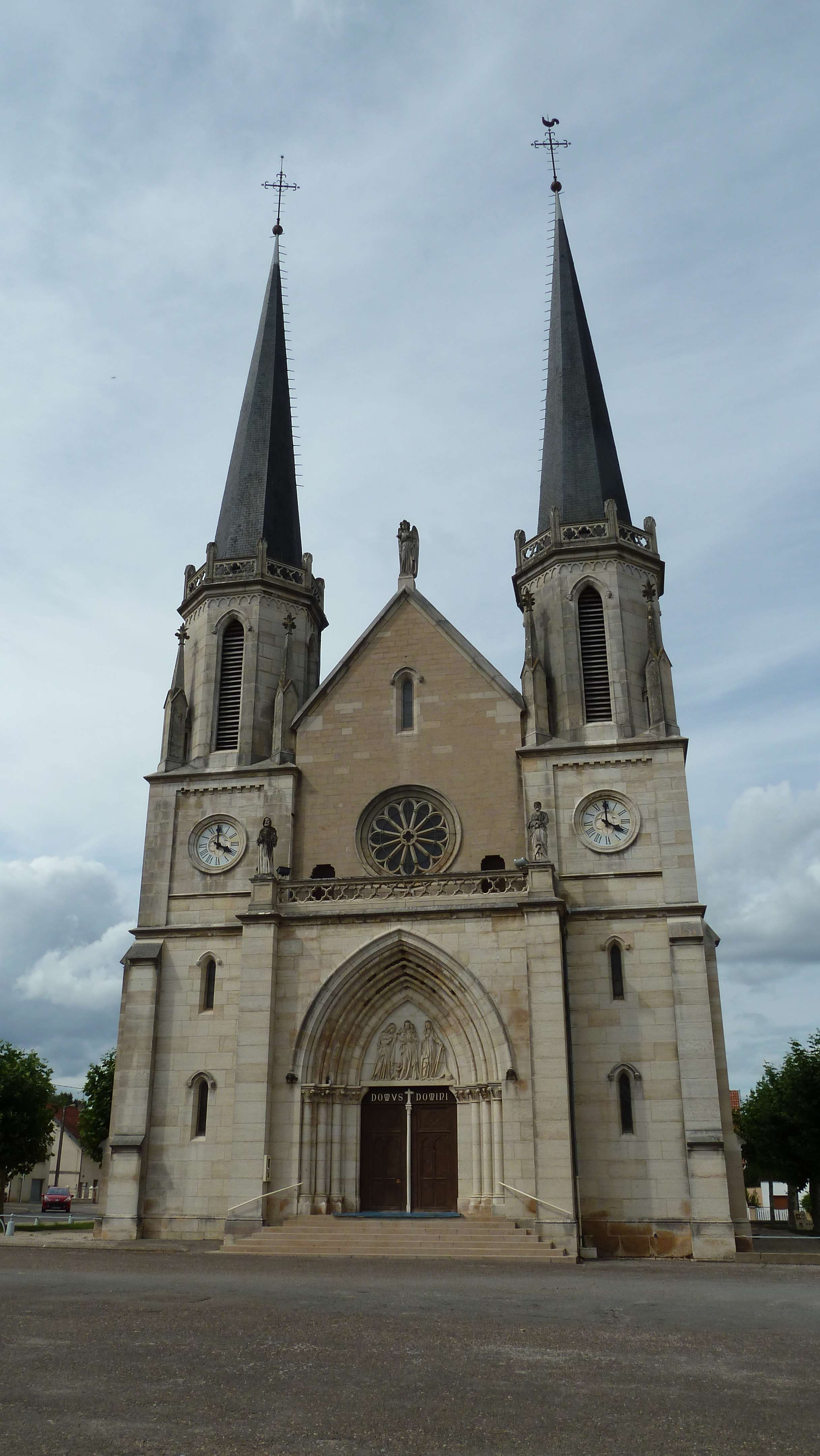
- The church in Lamarche-sur-Saône

- Coat of arms
- Location of Lamarche-sur-Saône
- Location within France Location within Bourgogne-Franche-Comté
- Coordinates: 47°16′13″N 5°23′09″E
- Country: France
- Region: Bourgogne-Franche-Comté
- Department: Côte-d'Or
- Arrondissement: Dijon
- Canton: Auxonne

Government
  - Mayor (2020–2026): Patrick Bovet
- Area^{1}: 33.96 km^{2} (13.11 sq mi)
- Elevation: 200 m (660 ft)
- Highest elevation: 238 m (781 ft)
- Lowest elevation: 182 m (597 ft)
- Population (2023): 1,382
  - Density: 40.69/km^{2} (105.4/sq mi)
- Time zone: UTC+01:00 (CET)
  - Summer (DST): UTC+02:00 (CEST)
- INSEE/Postal code: 21337 /21760
- ^{1} French Land Register data, which excludes lakes, ponds, glaciers > 1 km^{2} (0.386 sq mi or 247 acres) and river estuaries.

Lamarche-sur-Saône (French pronunciation: [lamaʁʃ syʁ son], literally Lamarche on Saône) is a commune in the Côte-d'Or department in eastern France.

== Population ==
Historical population
| Year | Pop. | ±% p.a. |
|---|---|---|
| 1968 | 1,206 | — |
| 1975 | 1,130 | −0.93% |
| 1982 | 1,256 | +1.52% |
| 1990 | 1,223 | −0.33% |
| 1999 | 1,201 | −0.20% |
| 2007 | 1,190 | −0.11% |
| 2012 | 1,303 | +1.83% |
| 2017 | 1,341 | +0.58% |
| 2023 | 1,382 | +0.50% |
Source: INSEE

== See also ==
- Communes of the Côte-d'Or department
