= Flammerans =

- Commune
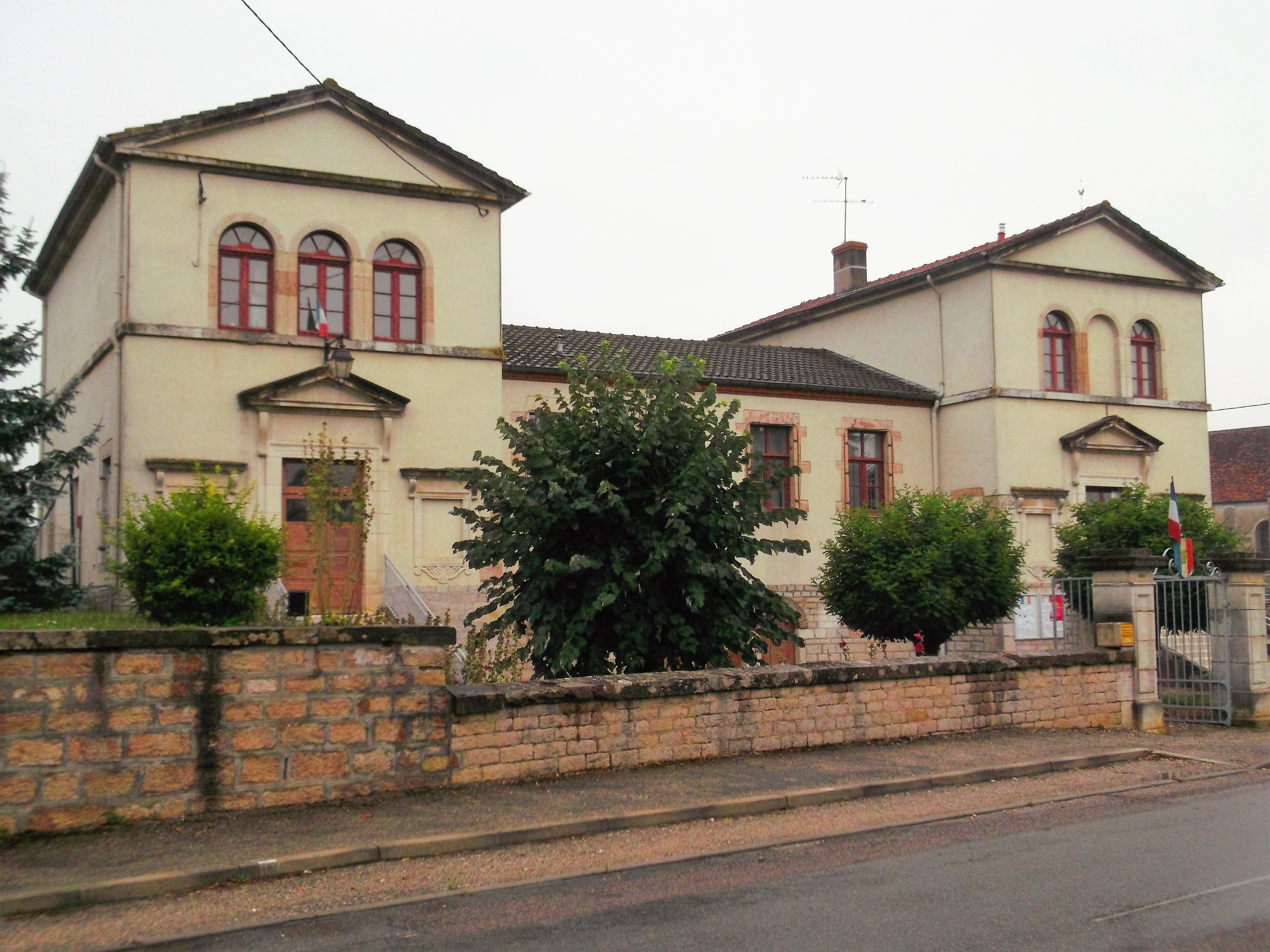
- Town hall
- Location of Flammerans
- Location within France Location within Bourgogne-Franche-Comté
- Coordinates: 47°13′52″N 5°26′54″E
- Country: France
- Region: Bourgogne-Franche-Comté
- Department: Côte-d'Or
- Arrondissement: Dijon
- Canton: Auxonne

Government
  - Mayor (2020–2026): Éric Loichot
- Area^{1}: 16.55 km^{2} (6.39 sq mi)
- Elevation: 200 m (660 ft)
- Highest elevation: 213 m (699 ft)
- Lowest elevation: 181 m (594 ft)
- Population (2023): 458
  - Density: 27.7/km^{2} (71.7/sq mi)
- Time zone: UTC+01:00 (CET)
  - Summer (DST): UTC+02:00 (CEST)
- INSEE/Postal code: 21269 /21130
- ^{1} French Land Register data, which excludes lakes, ponds, glaciers > 1 km^{2} (0.386 sq mi or 247 acres) and river estuaries.

Flammerans is a commune in the Côte-d'Or department in eastern France.

== Population ==
Historical population
Year	Pop.	±% p.a.
1968	303	—
1975	262	−2.06%
1982	322	+2.99%
1990	358	+1.33%
1999	335	−0.74%
2007	400	+2.24%
2012	418	+0.88%
2017	428	+0.47%
2023	458	+1.14%
Source: INSEE

== See also ==
- Communes of the Côte-d'Or department
