= Les Maillys =

- Commune
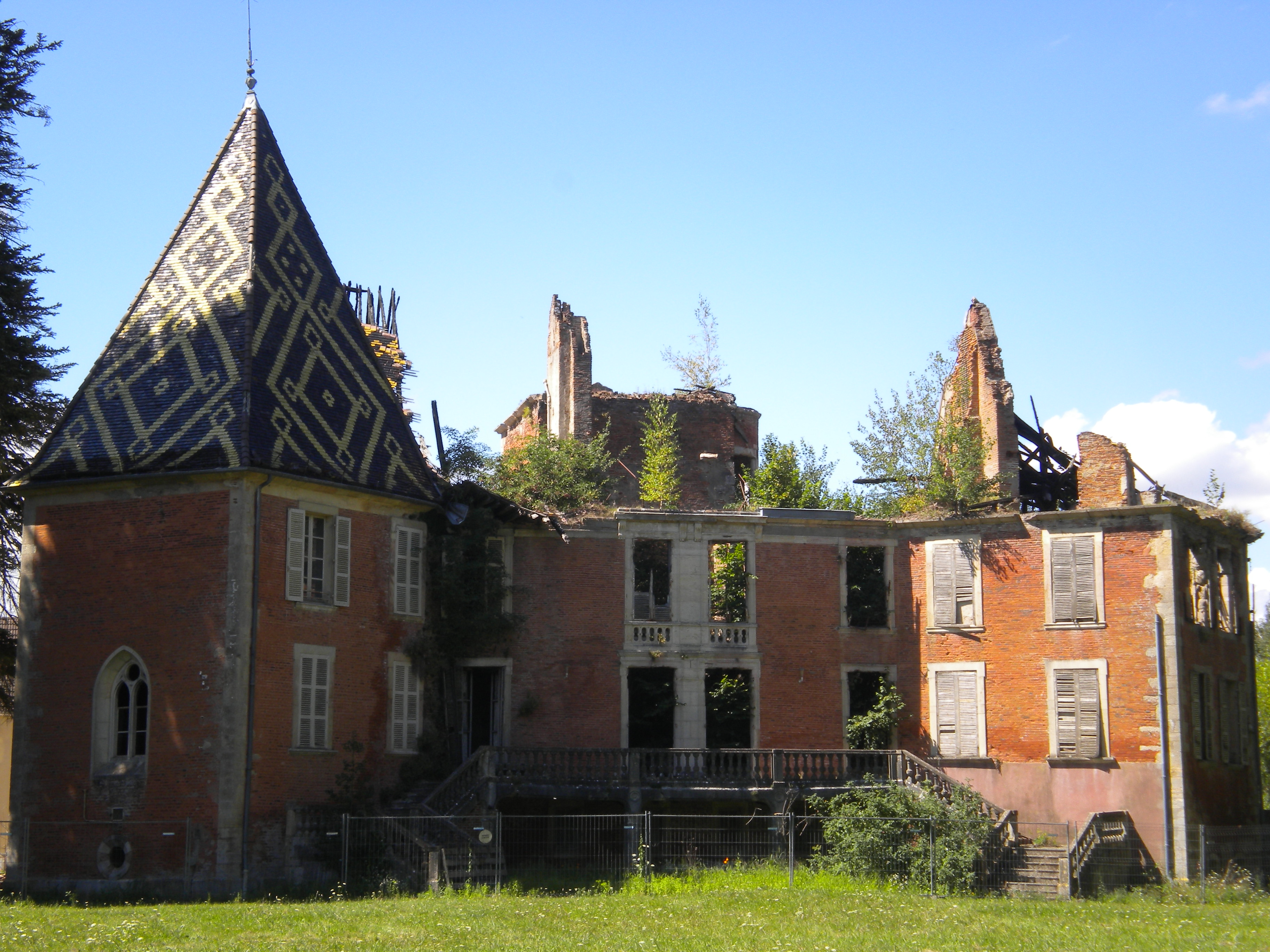
- Ruins of the chateau

- Coat of arms
- Location of Les Maillys
- Location within France Location within Bourgogne-Franche-Comté
- Coordinates: 47°08′16″N 5°20′27″E
- Country: France
- Region: Bourgogne-Franche-Comté
- Department: Côte-d'Or
- Arrondissement: Dijon
- Canton: Auxonne

Government
  - Mayor (2020–2026): Maximilien Aurousseau
- Area^{1}: 29.79 km^{2} (11.50 sq mi)
- Elevation: 182 m (597 ft)
- Highest elevation: 197 m (646 ft)
- Lowest elevation: 180 m (590 ft)
- Population (2023): 803
  - Density: 27.0/km^{2} (69.8/sq mi)
- Time zone: UTC+01:00 (CET)
  - Summer (DST): UTC+02:00 (CEST)
- INSEE/Postal code: 21371 /21130
- ^{1} French Land Register data, which excludes lakes, ponds, glaciers > 1 km^{2} (0.386 sq mi or 247 acres) and river estuaries.

Les Maillys (French pronunciation: [le maji]) is a commune in the Côte-d'Or department in eastern France.

== Population ==
Historical population
Year	Pop.	±% p.a.
1968	709	—
1975	668	−0.85%
1982	774	+2.13%
1990	739	−0.58%
1999	764	+0.37%
2007	819	+0.87%
2012	866	+1.12%
2017	820	−1.09%
2023	803	−0.35%
Source: INSEE

== See also ==
- Communes of the Côte-d'Or department
