= Périgny =

Périgny may refer to:

== Canada ==
- Périgny River, a tributary of the O'Sullivan River in Quebec

== France ==
- Périgny, Allier
- Périgny, Calvados
- Périgny, Charente-Maritime
- Périgny, Loir-et-Cher
- Périgny, Val-de-Marne
- Périgny-la-Rose, in the Aube département

== See also ==
- Perrigny (disambiguation)
