= Tréclun =

- Commune
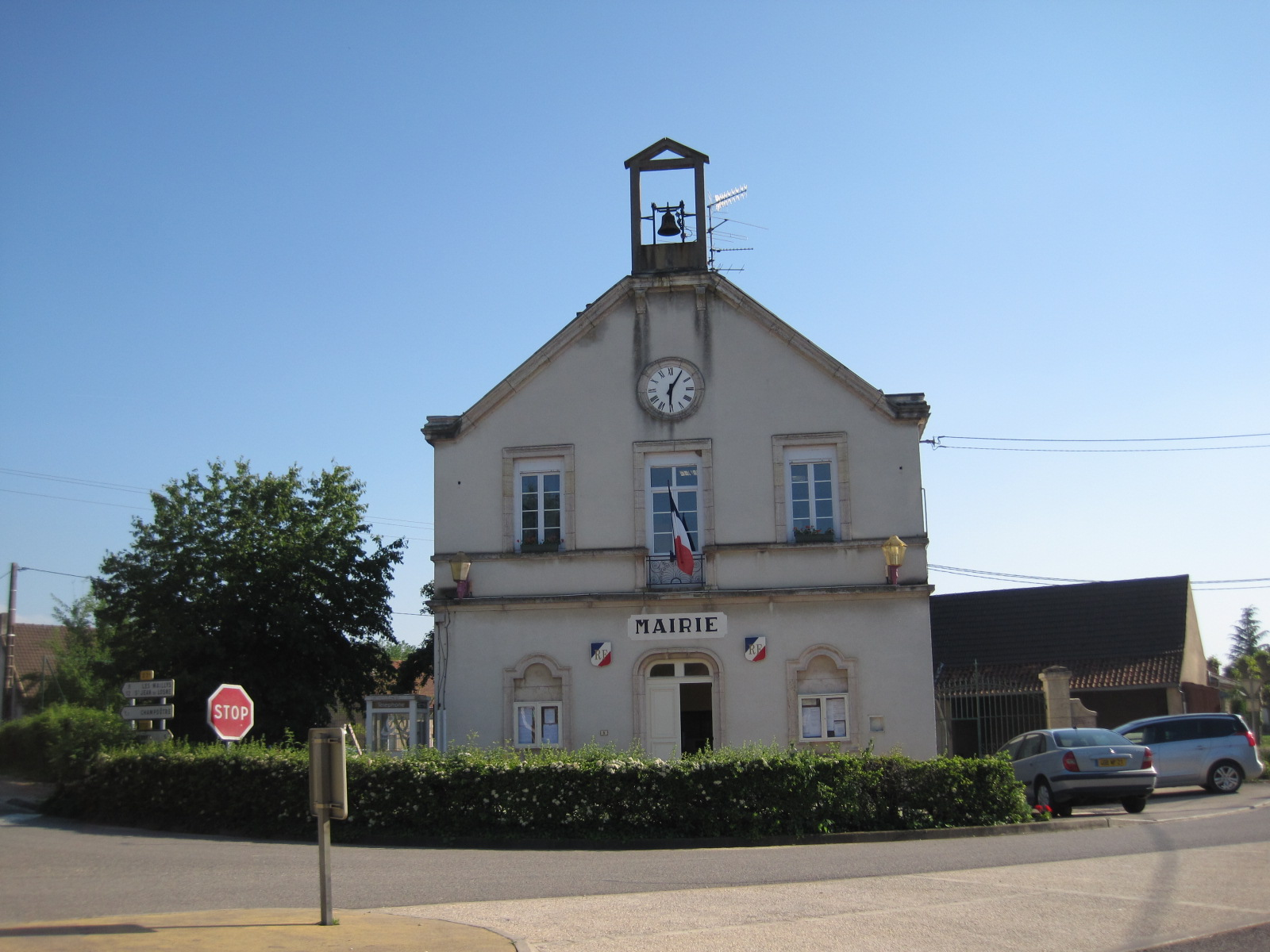
- Town hall
- Location of Tréclun
- Location within France Location within Bourgogne-Franche-Comté
- Coordinates: 47°11′28″N 5°17′31″E
- Country: France
- Region: Bourgogne-Franche-Comté
- Department: Côte-d'Or
- Arrondissement: Dijon
- Canton: Auxonne

Government
  - Mayor (2020–2026): Sébastien Sordel
- Area^{1}: 5.68 km^{2} (2.19 sq mi)
- Elevation: 188 m (617 ft)
- Highest elevation: 204 m (669 ft)
- Lowest elevation: 187 m (614 ft)
- Population (2023): 423
  - Density: 74.5/km^{2} (193/sq mi)
- Time zone: UTC+01:00 (CET)
  - Summer (DST): UTC+02:00 (CEST)
- INSEE/Postal code: 21643 /21130
- ^{1} French Land Register data, which excludes lakes, ponds, glaciers > 1 km^{2} (0.386 sq mi or 247 acres) and river estuaries.

Tréclun (French pronunciation: [tʁeklœ̃]) is a commune in the Côte-d'Or department in eastern France.

== Population ==
Historical population
Year	Pop.	±% p.a.
1968	206	—
1975	215	+0.61%
1982	211	−0.27%
1990	213	+0.12%
1999	222	+0.46%
2007	295	+3.62%
2012	440	+8.32%
2017	470	+1.33%
2023	423	−1.74%
Source: INSEE

== See also ==
- Communes of the Côte-d'Or department
