= Labergement-lès-Auxonne =

- Commune
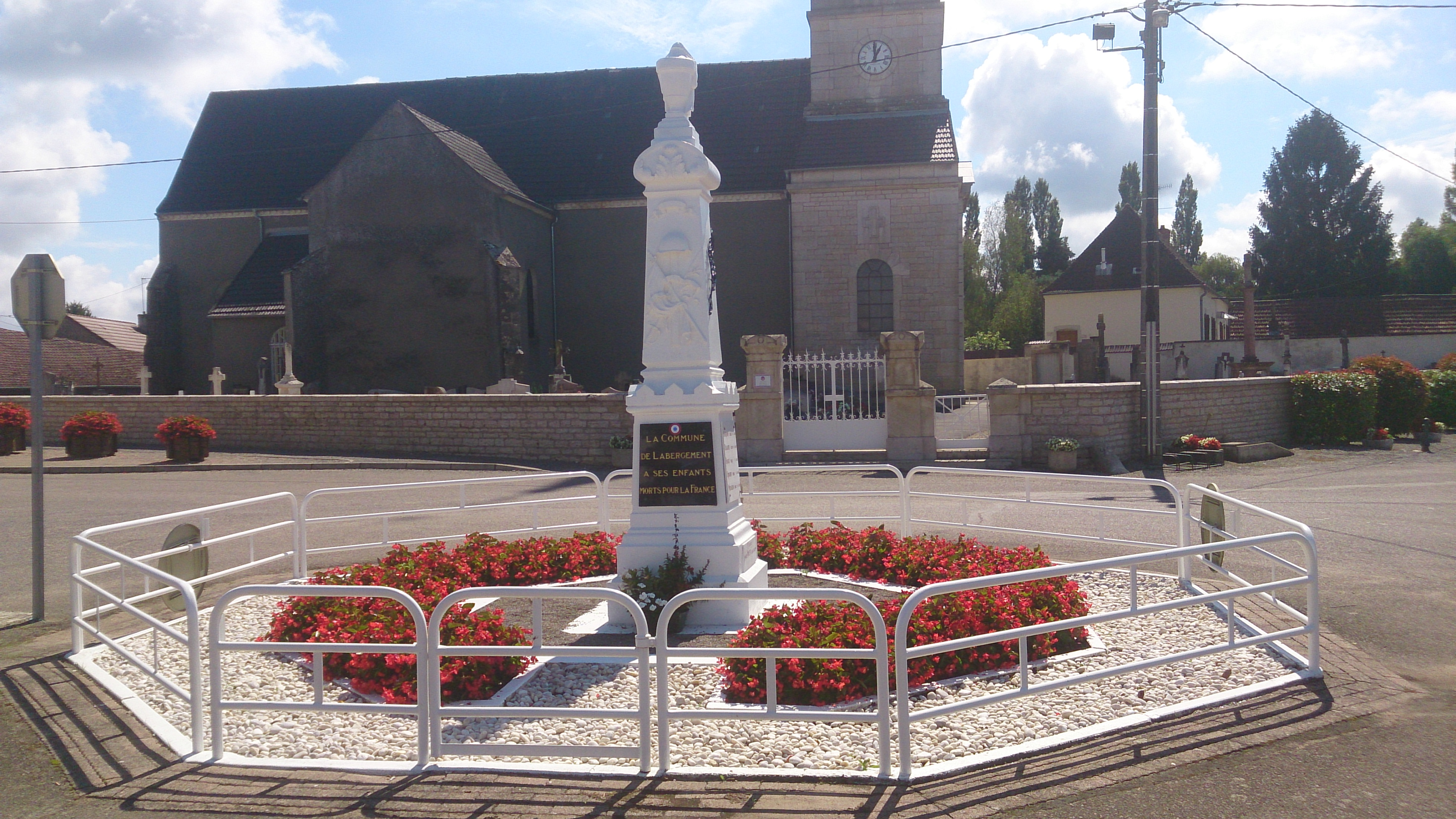
- The war memorial and church in Labergement-lès-Auxonne

- Coat of arms
- Location of Labergement-lès-Auxonne
- Location within France Location within Bourgogne-Franche-Comté
- Coordinates: 47°09′32″N 5°22′53″E
- Country: France
- Region: Bourgogne-Franche-Comté
- Department: Côte-d'Or
- Arrondissement: Dijon
- Canton: Auxonne

Government
  - Mayor (2020–2026): Christophe Bringout
- Area^{1}: 5.93 km^{2} (2.29 sq mi)
- Highest elevation: 186 m (610 ft)
- Lowest elevation: 180 m (590 ft)
- Population (2023): 350
  - Density: 59/km^{2} (150/sq mi)
- Time zone: UTC+01:00 (CET)
  - Summer (DST): UTC+02:00 (CEST)
- INSEE/Postal code: 21331 /21130
- ^{1} French Land Register data, which excludes lakes, ponds, glaciers > 1 km^{2} (0.386 sq mi or 247 acres) and river estuaries.

Labergement-lès-Auxonne (French pronunciation: [labɛʁʒəmɑ̃ lɛ.z‿oksɔn], literally Labergement near Auxonne) is a commune in the Côte-d'Or department in eastern France.

== Population ==
Historical population
Year	Pop.	±% p.a.
1968	317	—
1975	361	+1.87%
1982	318	−1.80%
1990	348	+1.13%
1999	330	−0.59%
2007	348	+0.67%
2012	334	−0.82%
2017	328	−0.36%
2023	350	+1.09%
Source: INSEE

== See also ==
- Communes of the Côte-d'Or department
