= Binges, Côte-d'Or =

Binges
- Commune
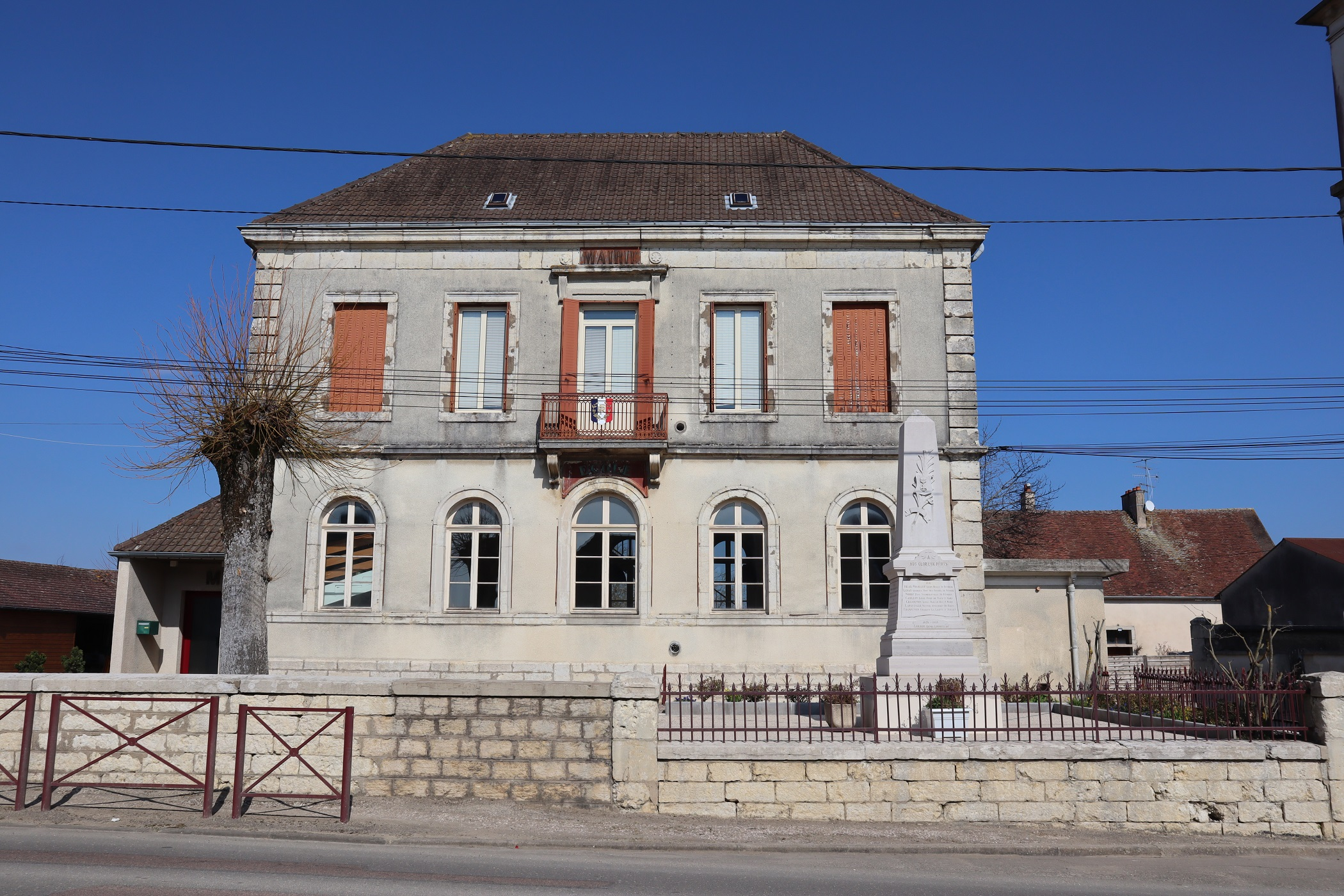
- Town hall

- Coat of arms
- Location of Binges
- Location within France Location within Bourgogne-Franche-Comté
- Coordinates: 47°19′48″N 5°16′05″E
- Country: France
- Region: Bourgogne-Franche-Comté
- Department: Côte-d'Or
- Arrondissement: Dijon
- Canton: Auxonne

Government
  - Mayor (2020–2026): Hugues Antoine
- Area^{1}: 17.66 km^{2} (6.82 sq mi)
- Elevation: 209 m (686 ft)
- Highest elevation: 240 m (790 ft)
- Lowest elevation: 193 m (633 ft)
- Population (2023): 880
  - Density: 50/km^{2} (130/sq mi)
- Time zone: UTC+01:00 (CET)
  - Summer (DST): UTC+02:00 (CEST)
- INSEE/Postal code: 21076 /21270
- ^{1} French Land Register data, which excludes lakes, ponds, glaciers > 1 km^{2} (0.386 sq mi or 247 acres) and river estuaries.

Binges (French pronunciation: [bɛ̃ʒ]) is a commune in the Côte-d'Or department in eastern France.

== Population ==
Historical population
Year	Pop.	±% p.a.
1968	353	—
1975	438	+3.13%
1982	470	+1.01%
1990	508	+0.98%
1999	581	+1.50%
2007	618	+0.77%
2012	647	+0.92%
2017	790	+4.07%
2023	880	+1.81%
Source: INSEE

== See also ==
- Communes of the Côte-d'Or department
