= Saint-Léger-Triey =

- Commune
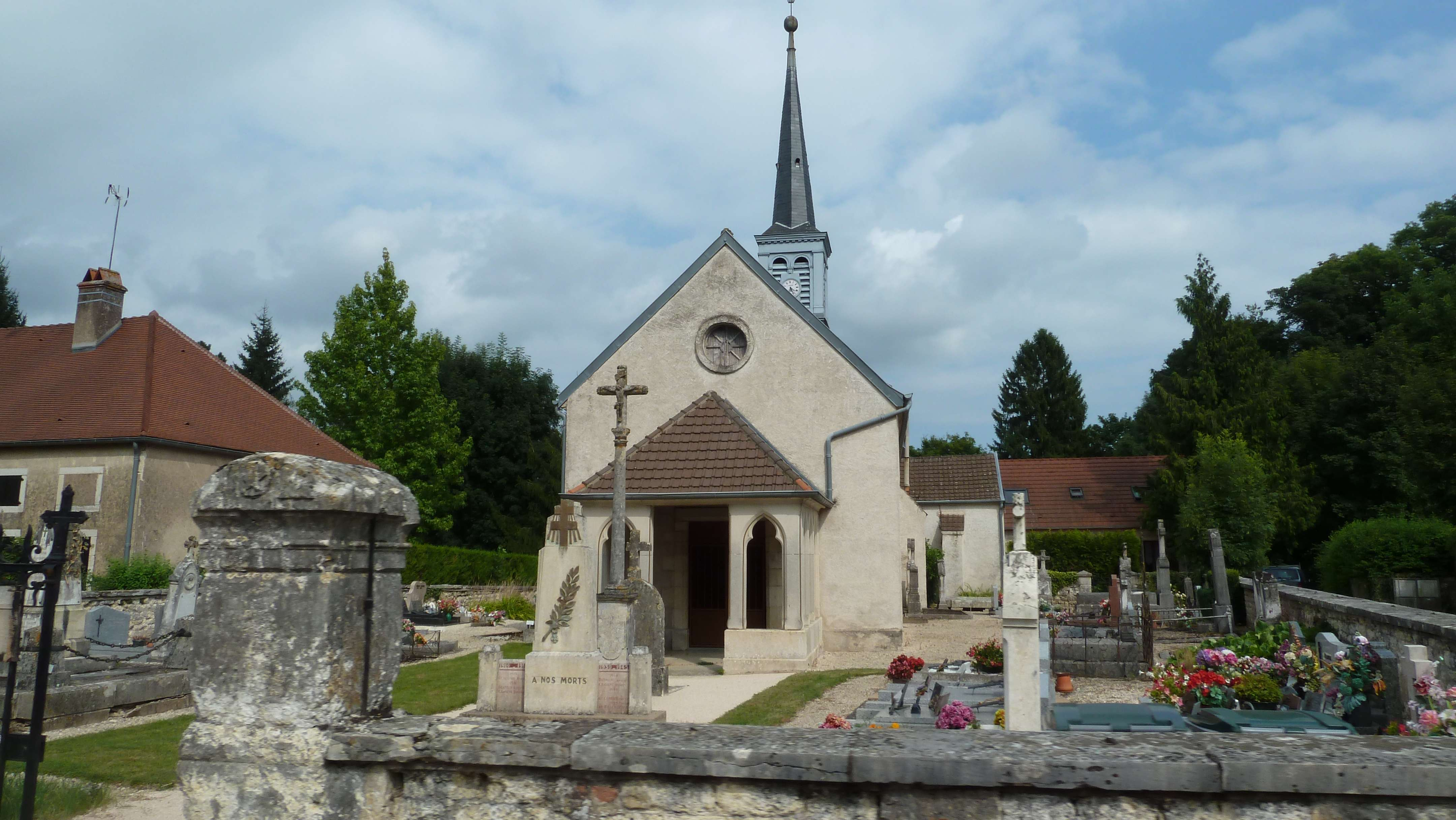
- The church in Saint-Léger-Triey

- Coat of arms
- Location of Saint-Léger-Triey
- Location within France Location within Bourgogne-Franche-Comté
- Coordinates: 47°18′57″N 5°21′56″E
- Country: France
- Region: Bourgogne-Franche-Comté
- Department: Côte-d'Or
- Arrondissement: Dijon
- Canton: Auxonne

Government
  - Mayor (2020–2026): Jean-Luc Laffuge
- Area^{1}: 10.46 km^{2} (4.04 sq mi)
- Elevation: 188 m (617 ft)
- Highest elevation: 217 m (712 ft)
- Lowest elevation: 185 m (607 ft)
- Population (2023): 258
  - Density: 24.7/km^{2} (63.9/sq mi)
- Time zone: UTC+01:00 (CET)
  - Summer (DST): UTC+02:00 (CEST)
- INSEE/Postal code: 21556 /21270
- ^{1} French Land Register data, which excludes lakes, ponds, glaciers > 1 km^{2} (0.386 sq mi or 247 acres) and river estuaries.

Saint-Léger-Triey (French pronunciation: [sɛ̃ leʒe tʁijɛ]) is a commune in the Côte-d'Or department in eastern France.

== Population ==
Historical population
Year	Pop.	±% p.a.
1968	104	—
1975	119	+1.94%
1982	105	−1.77%
1990	146	+4.21%
1999	145	−0.08%
2007	197	+3.91%
2012	235	+3.59%
2017	252	+1.41%
2023	258	+0.39%
Source: INSEE

== See also ==
- Communes of the Côte-d'Or department
