= Vielverge =

- Commune
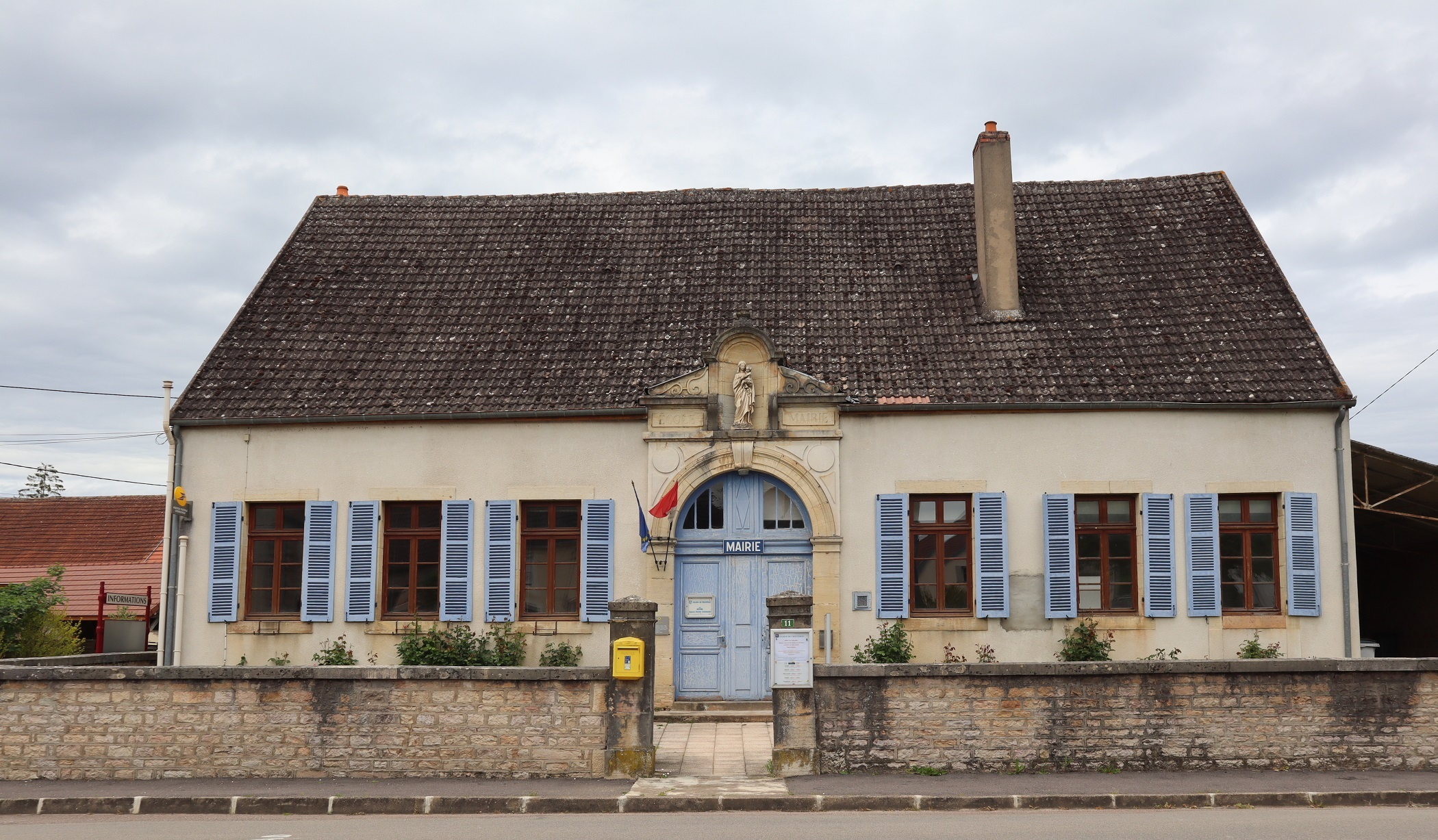
- Town hall

- Coat of arms
- Location of Vielverge
- Location within France Location within Bourgogne-Franche-Comté
- Coordinates: 47°16′10″N 5°27′07″E
- Country: France
- Region: Bourgogne-Franche-Comté
- Department: Côte-d'Or
- Arrondissement: Dijon
- Canton: Auxonne

Government
  - Mayor (2020–2026): Evelyne Sommet
- Area^{1}: 14.78 km^{2} (5.71 sq mi)
- Elevation: 187 m (614 ft)
- Highest elevation: 207 m (679 ft)
- Lowest elevation: 180 m (590 ft)
- Population (2023): 495
  - Density: 33.5/km^{2} (86.7/sq mi)
- Time zone: UTC+01:00 (CET)
  - Summer (DST): UTC+02:00 (CEST)
- INSEE/Postal code: 21680 /21270
- ^{1} French Land Register data, which excludes lakes, ponds, glaciers > 1 km^{2} (0.386 sq mi or 247 acres) and river estuaries.

Vielverge (French pronunciation: [vjɛlvɛʁʒ]) is a commune in the Côte-d'Or department in eastern France.

== Population ==
Historical population
Year	Pop.	±% p.a.
1968	484	—
1975	504	+0.58%
1982	452	−1.54%
1990	443	−0.25%
1999	459	+0.40%
2007	490	+0.82%
2012	491	+0.04%
2017	496	+0.20%
2023	495	−0.03%
Source: INSEE

== See also ==
- Communes of the Côte-d'Or department
