= Saint-Sauveur, Côte-d'Or =

Saint-Sauveur
- Commune
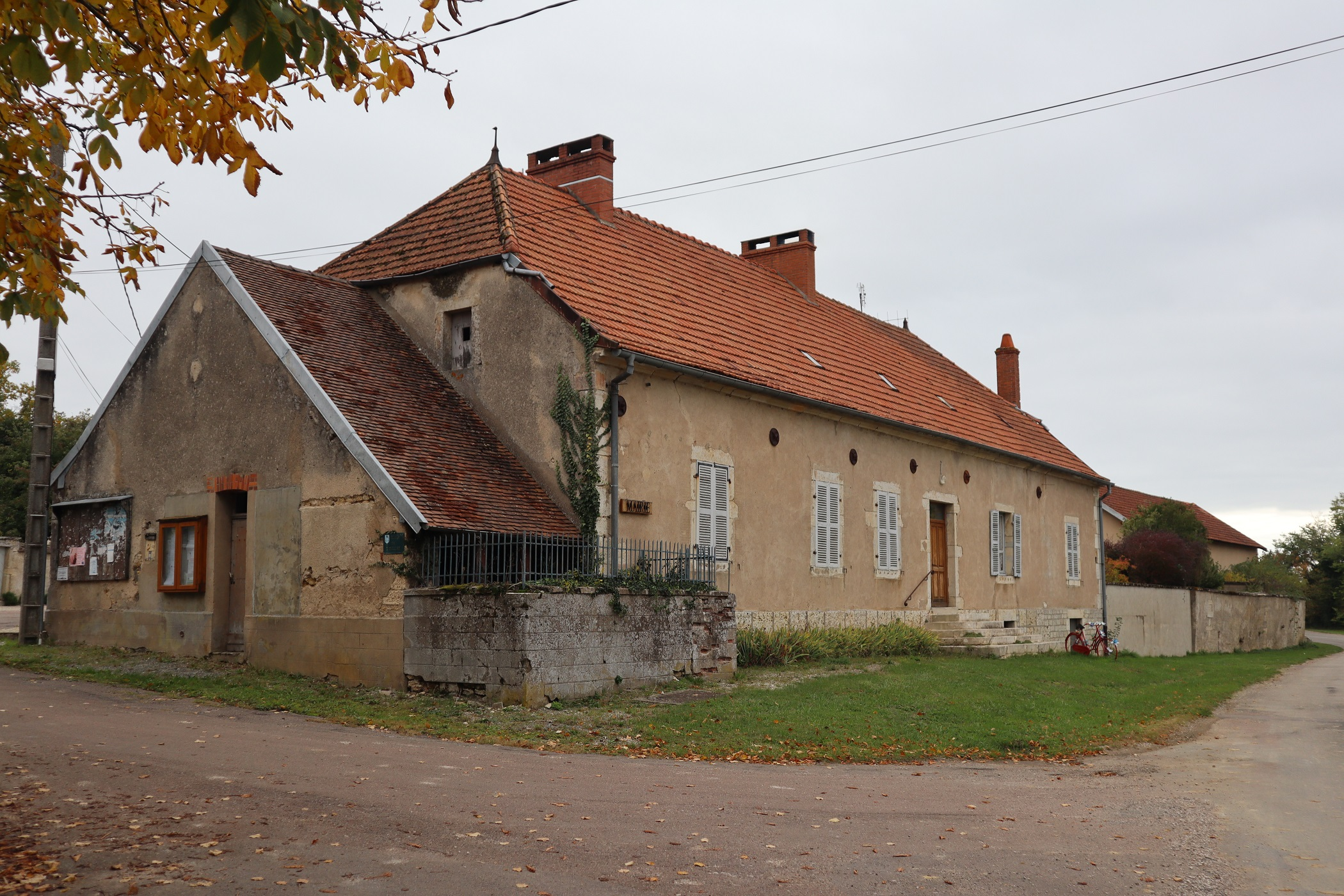
- Town hall

- Coat of arms
- Location of Saint-Sauveur
- Location within France Location within Bourgogne-Franche-Comté
- Coordinates: 47°21′32″N 5°24′54″E
- Country: France
- Region: Bourgogne-Franche-Comté
- Department: Côte-d'Or
- Arrondissement: Dijon
- Canton: Auxonne

Government
  - Mayor (2020–2026): Daniel Ruard
- Area^{1}: 9.38 km^{2} (3.62 sq mi)
- Elevation: 199 m (653 ft)
- Highest elevation: 211 m (692 ft)
- Lowest elevation: 188 m (617 ft)
- Population (2023): 225
  - Density: 24.0/km^{2} (62.1/sq mi)
- Time zone: UTC+01:00 (CET)
  - Summer (DST): UTC+02:00 (CEST)
- INSEE/Postal code: 21571 /21270
- ^{1} French Land Register data, which excludes lakes, ponds, glaciers > 1 km^{2} (0.386 sq mi or 247 acres) and river estuaries.

Saint-Sauveur (French pronunciation: [sɛ̃ sovœʁ]) is a commune in Côte-d'Or, a department in eastern France.

== Population ==
Historical population
| Year | Pop. | ±% p.a. |
|---|---|---|
| 1968 | 148 | — |
| 1975 | 120 | −2.95% |
| 1982 | 140 | +2.23% |
| 1990 | 171 | +2.53% |
| 1999 | 206 | +2.09% |
| 2007 | 174 | −2.09% |
| 2012 | 259 | +8.28% |
| 2017 | 251 | −0.63% |
| 2023 | 225 | −1.81% |
Source: INSEE

== See also ==
- Communes of the Côte-d'Or department
