= Soirans =

- Commune
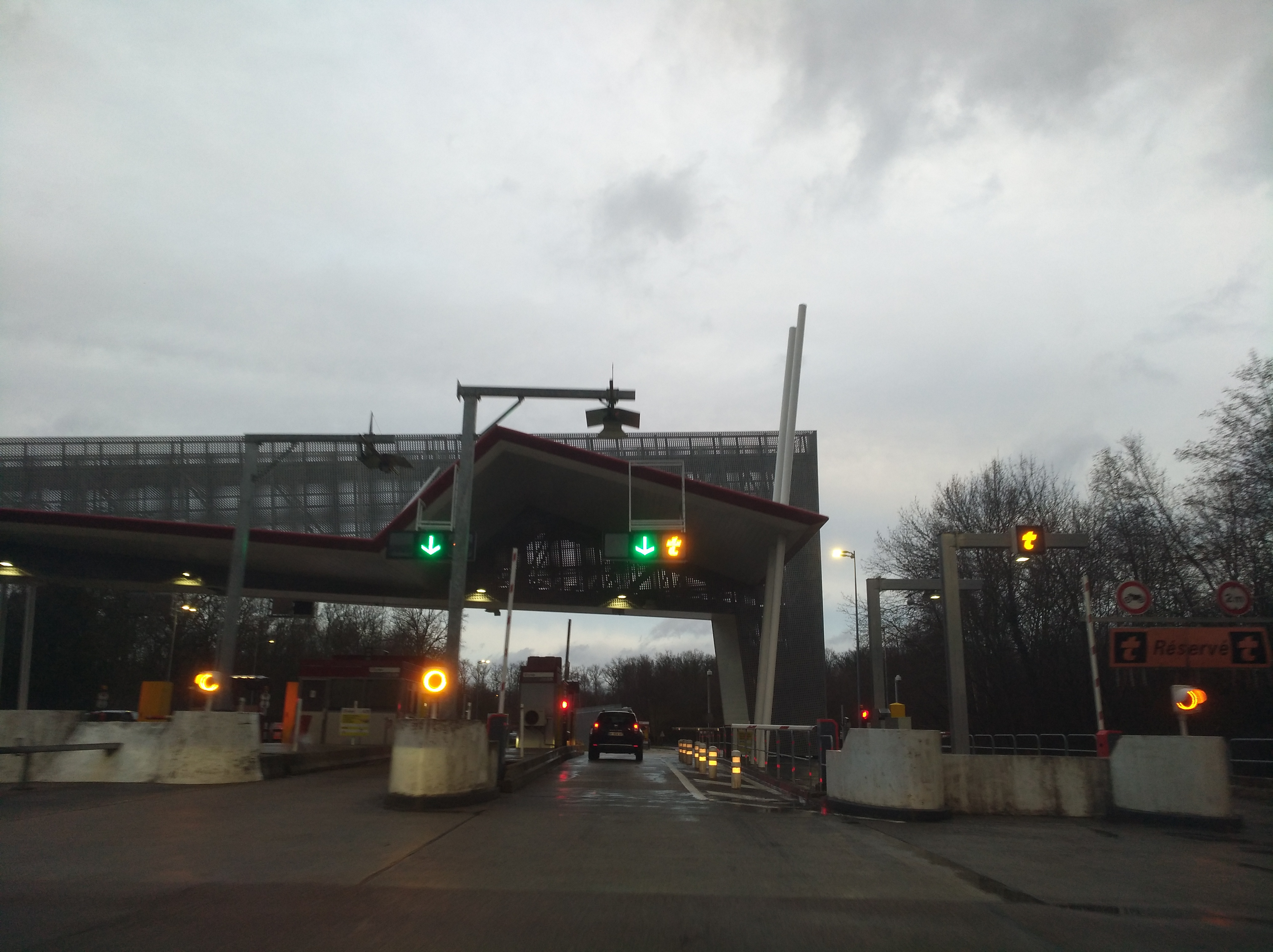
- Autoroute A39 tollbooths at Soirans

- Coat of arms
- Location of Soirans
- Location within France Location within Bourgogne-Franche-Comté
- Coordinates: 47°12′27″N 5°17′21″E
- Country: France
- Region: Bourgogne-Franche-Comté
- Department: Côte-d'Or
- Arrondissement: Dijon
- Canton: Auxonne

Government
  - Mayor (2020–2026): Jean-Paul Vadot
- Area^{1}: 4.42 km^{2} (1.71 sq mi)
- Elevation: 190 m (620 ft)
- Highest elevation: 204 m (669 ft)
- Lowest elevation: 189 m (620 ft)
- Population (2023): 494
  - Density: 112/km^{2} (289/sq mi)
- Time zone: UTC+01:00 (CET)
  - Summer (DST): UTC+02:00 (CEST)
- INSEE/Postal code: 21609 /21110
- ^{1} French Land Register data, which excludes lakes, ponds, glaciers > 1 km^{2} (0.386 sq mi or 247 acres) and river estuaries.

Soirans (French pronunciation: [swaʁɑ̃], before 1993: Soirans-Fouffrans) is a commune in the Côte-d'Or department in eastern France.

== Population ==
Historical population
Year	Pop.	±% p.a.
1968	114	—
1975	118	+0.49%
1982	234	+10.27%
1990	330	+4.39%
1999	361	+1.00%
2007	458	+3.02%
2012	462	+0.17%
2017	485	+0.98%
2023	494	+0.31%
Source: INSEE

== See also ==
- Communes of the Côte-d'Or department
