= Villers-Rotin =

- Commune
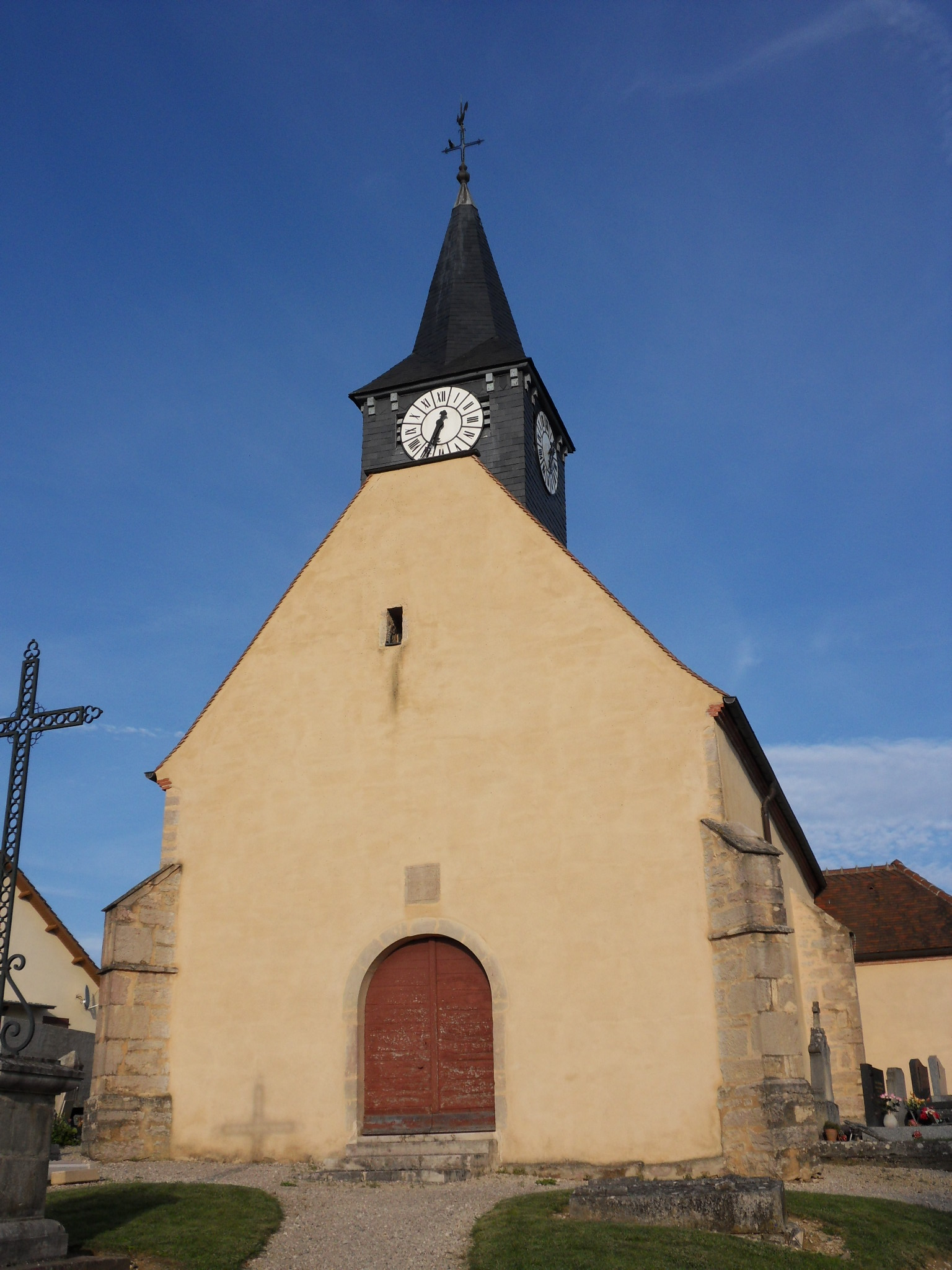
- The church in Villers-Rotin

- Coat of arms
- Location of Villers-Rotin
- Location within France Location within Bourgogne-Franche-Comté
- Coordinates: 47°09′27″N 5°24′24″E
- Country: France
- Region: Bourgogne-Franche-Comté
- Department: Côte-d'Or
- Arrondissement: Dijon
- Canton: Auxonne

Government
  - Mayor (2020–2026): Anthony Mausservey
- Area^{1}: 3.11 km^{2} (1.20 sq mi)
- Elevation: 192 m (630 ft)
- Highest elevation: 206 m (676 ft)
- Lowest elevation: 182 m (597 ft)
- Population (2023): 124
  - Density: 39.9/km^{2} (103/sq mi)
- Time zone: UTC+01:00 (CET)
  - Summer (DST): UTC+02:00 (CEST)
- INSEE/Postal code: 21701 /21130
- ^{1} French Land Register data, which excludes lakes, ponds, glaciers > 1 km^{2} (0.386 sq mi or 247 acres) and river estuaries.

Villers-Rotin (French pronunciation: [vilɛʁ ʁɔtɛ̃]) is a commune in the Côte-d'Or department in eastern France.

== Population ==
Historical population
Year	Pop.	±% p.a.
1968	112	—
1975	97	−2.03%
1982	120	+3.09%
1990	129	+0.91%
1999	121	−0.71%
2007	132	+1.09%
2012	135	+0.45%
2017	128	−1.06%
2023	124	−0.53%
Source: INSEE

== See also ==
- Communes of the Côte-d'Or department
