= Montmançon =

- Commune
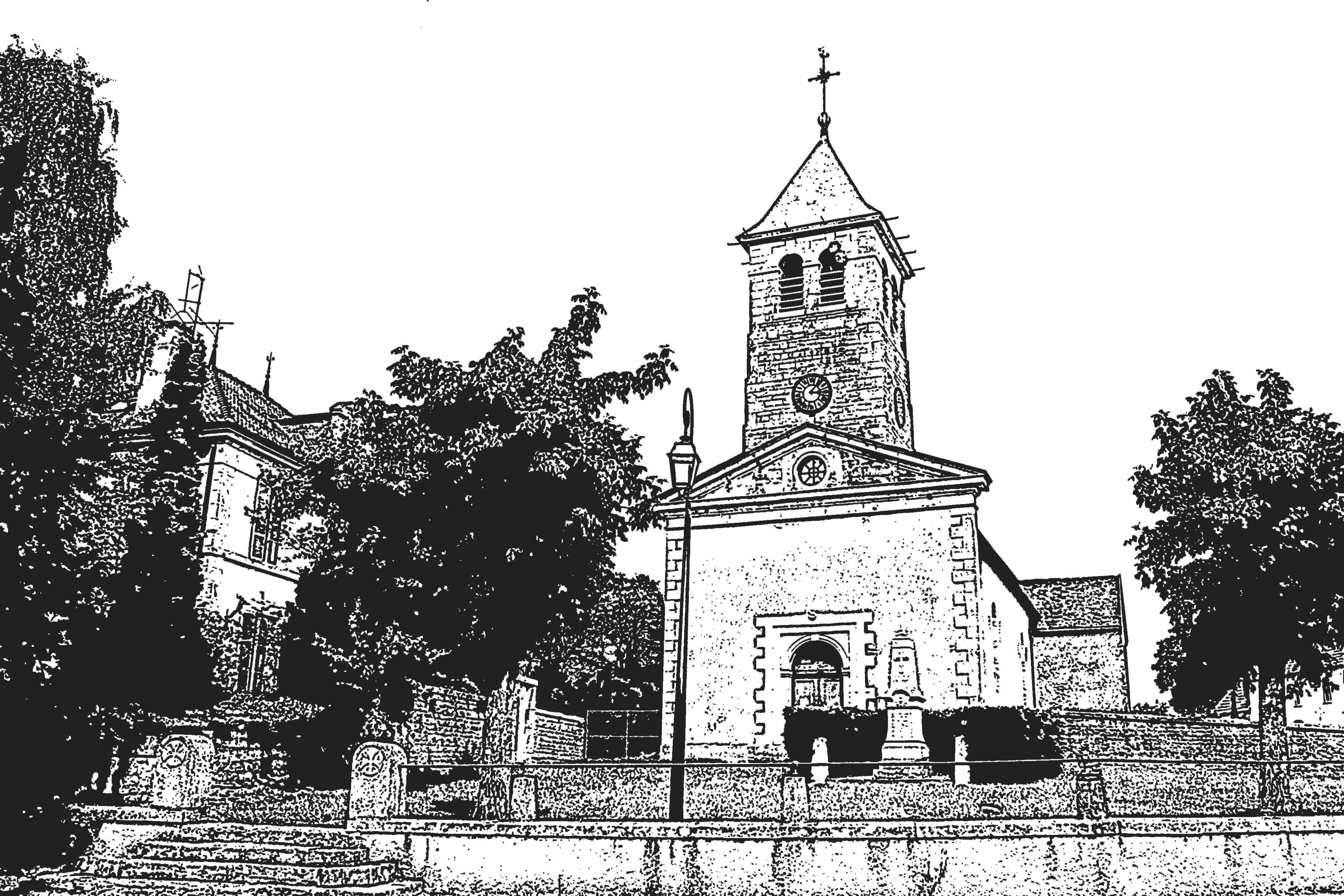
- The church in Montmançon

- Coat of arms
- Location of Montmançon
- Location within France Location within Bourgogne-Franche-Comté
- Coordinates: 47°21′12″N 5°22′46″E
- Country: France
- Region: Bourgogne-Franche-Comté
- Department: Côte-d'Or
- Arrondissement: Dijon
- Canton: Auxonne

Government
  - Mayor (2020–2026): Patrick Ryser
- Area^{1}: 8.99 km^{2} (3.47 sq mi)
- Elevation: 208 m (682 ft)
- Highest elevation: 221 m (725 ft)
- Lowest elevation: 188 m (617 ft)
- Population (2023): 237
  - Density: 26.4/km^{2} (68.3/sq mi)
- Time zone: UTC+01:00 (CET)
  - Summer (DST): UTC+02:00 (CEST)
- INSEE/Postal code: 21437 /21270
- ^{1} French Land Register data, which excludes lakes, ponds, glaciers > 1 km^{2} (0.386 sq mi or 247 acres) and river estuaries.

Montmançon (French pronunciation: [mɔ̃mɑ̃sɔ̃]) is a commune in the Côte-d'Or department in eastern France.

== Population ==
Historical population
Year	Pop.	±% p.a.
1968	110	—
1975	97	−1.78%
1982	144	+5.81%
1990	164	+1.64%
1999	159	−0.34%
2007	203	+3.10%
2012	235	+2.97%
2017	248	+1.08%
2023	237	−0.75%
Source: INSEE

== See also ==
- Communes of the Côte-d'Or department
