= Magny-Montarlot =

- Commune
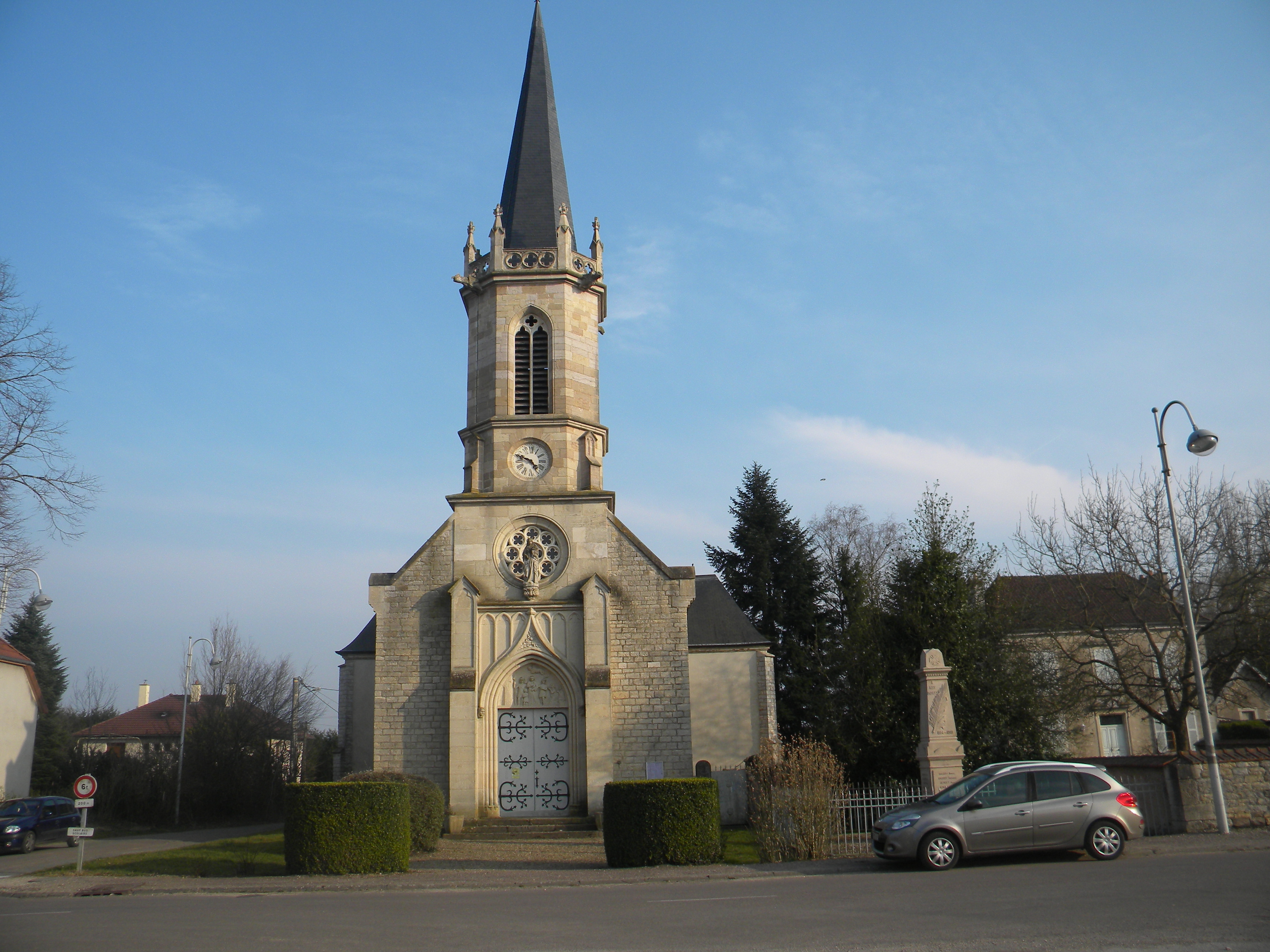
- The church in Magny-Montarlot

- Coat of arms
- Location of Magny-Montarlot
- Location within France Location within Bourgogne-Franche-Comté
- Coordinates: 47°14′55″N 5°20′51″E
- Country: France
- Region: Bourgogne-Franche-Comté
- Department: Côte-d'Or
- Arrondissement: Dijon
- Canton: Auxonne

Government
  - Mayor (2020–2026): Franck Deloy
- Area^{1}: 5.94 km^{2} (2.29 sq mi)
- Elevation: 230 m (750 ft)
- Highest elevation: 238 m (781 ft)
- Lowest elevation: 193 m (633 ft)
- Population (2023): 262
  - Density: 44.1/km^{2} (114/sq mi)
- Time zone: UTC+01:00 (CET)
  - Summer (DST): UTC+02:00 (CEST)
- INSEE/Postal code: 21367 /21130
- ^{1} French Land Register data, which excludes lakes, ponds, glaciers > 1 km^{2} (0.386 sq mi or 247 acres) and river estuaries.

Magny-Montarlot (French pronunciation: [maɲi mɔ̃taʁlo]) is a commune in the Côte-d'Or department in eastern France.

== Population ==
Historical population
Year	Pop.	±% p.a.
1968	154	—
1975	151	−0.28%
1982	184	+2.86%
1990	192	+0.53%
1999	185	−0.41%
2007	199	+0.92%
2012	257	+5.25%
2017	265	+0.61%
2023	262	−0.19%
Source: INSEE

== See also ==
- Communes of the Côte-d'Or department
