= Tillenay =

- Commune
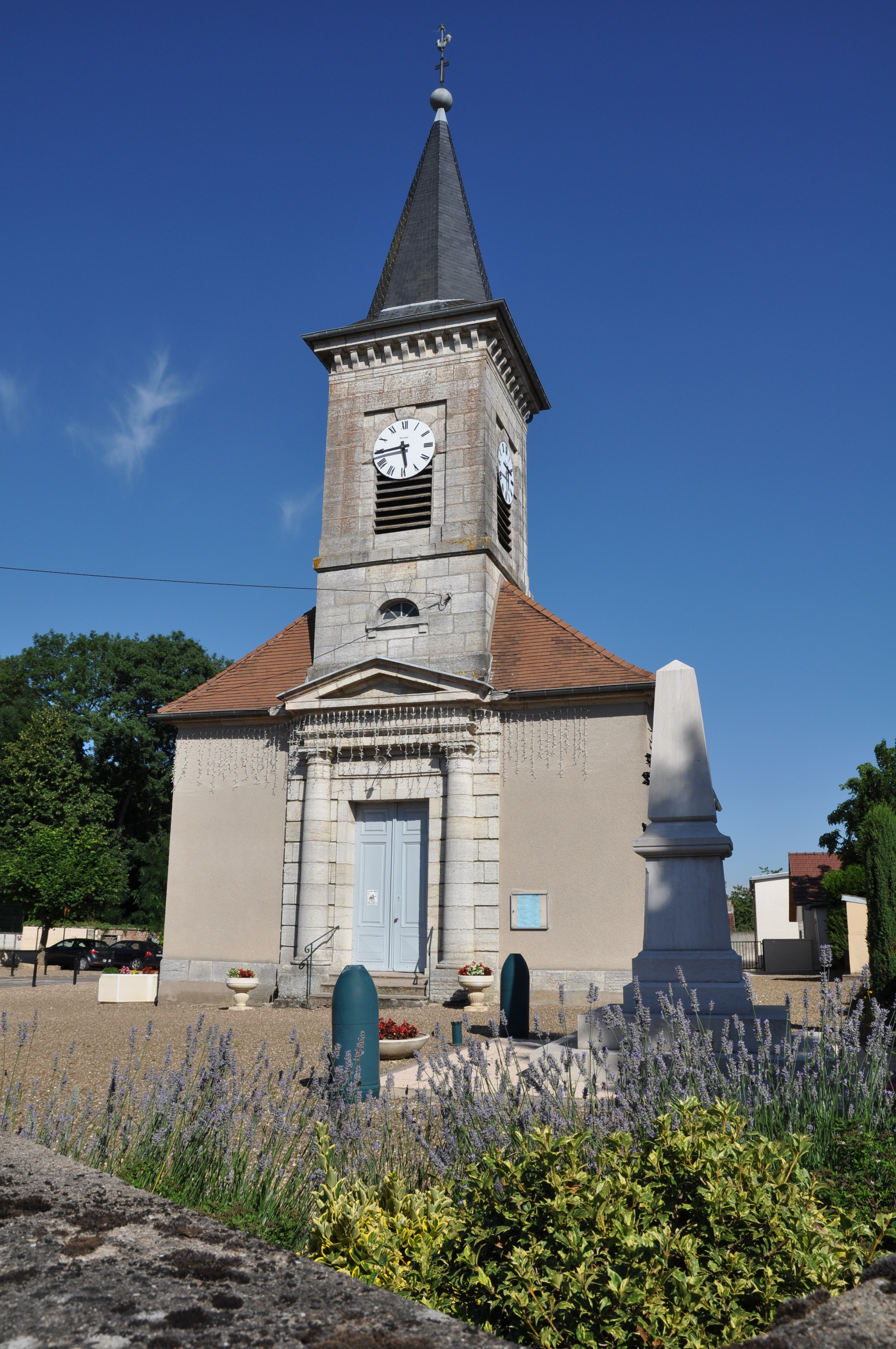
- The church in Tillenay
- Location of Tillenay
- Location within France Location within Bourgogne-Franche-Comté
- Coordinates: 47°10′54″N 5°21′11″E
- Country: France
- Region: Bourgogne-Franche-Comté
- Department: Côte-d'Or
- Arrondissement: Dijon
- Canton: Auxonne

Government
  - Mayor (2020–2026): Christophe Febvret
- Area^{1}: 6.07 km^{2} (2.34 sq mi)
- Elevation: 182 m (597 ft)
- Highest elevation: 204 m (669 ft)
- Lowest elevation: 181 m (594 ft)
- Population (2023): 743
  - Density: 122/km^{2} (317/sq mi)
- Time zone: UTC+01:00 (CET)
  - Summer (DST): UTC+02:00 (CEST)
- INSEE/Postal code: 21639 /21130
- ^{1} French Land Register data, which excludes lakes, ponds, glaciers > 1 km^{2} (0.386 sq mi or 247 acres) and river estuaries.

Tillenay is a commune in the Côte-d'Or department in eastern France.

== Population ==
Historical population
| Year | Pop. | ±% p.a. |
|---|---|---|
| 1968 | 479 | — |
| 1975 | 455 | −0.73% |
| 1982 | 452 | −0.09% |
| 1990 | 476 | +0.65% |
| 1999 | 501 | +0.57% |
| 2007 | 623 | +2.76% |
| 2012 | 762 | +4.11% |
| 2017 | 762 | +0.00% |
| 2023 | 743 | −0.42% |
Source: INSEE

== See also ==
- Communes of the Côte-d'Or department
