= Champdôtre =

- Commune
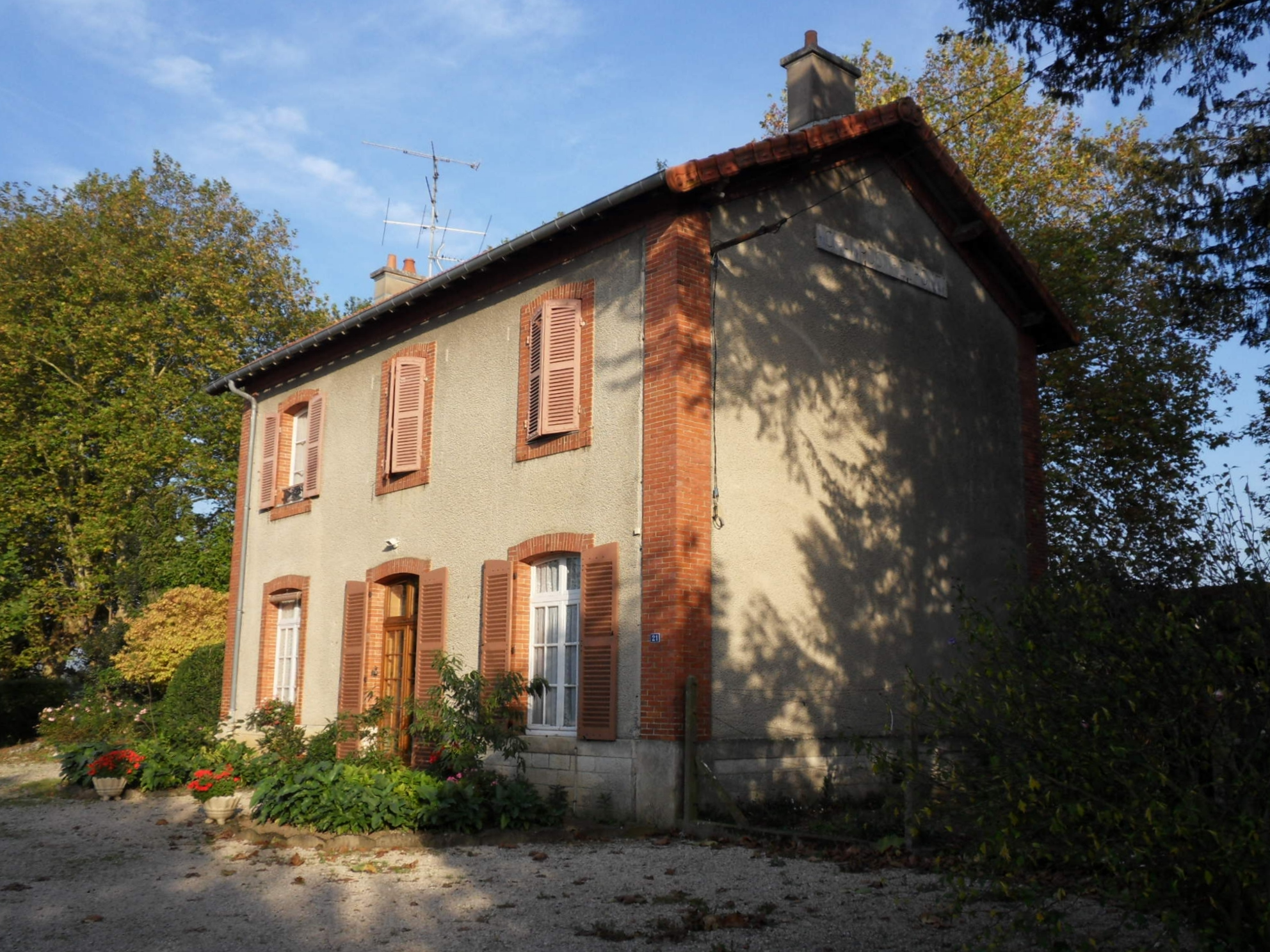
- Train station

- Coat of arms
- Location of Champdôtre
- Location within France Location within Bourgogne-Franche-Comté
- Coordinates: 47°10′56″N 5°18′16″E
- Country: France
- Region: Bourgogne-Franche-Comté
- Department: Côte-d'Or
- Arrondissement: Dijon
- Canton: Auxonne

Government
  - Mayor (2020–2026): Jean-Louis Laguerre
- Area^{1}: 10.44 km^{2} (4.03 sq mi)
- Elevation: 191 m (627 ft)
- Highest elevation: 204 m (669 ft)
- Lowest elevation: 185 m (607 ft)
- Population (2023): 600
  - Density: 57/km^{2} (150/sq mi)
- Time zone: UTC+01:00 (CET)
  - Summer (DST): UTC+02:00 (CEST)
- INSEE/Postal code: 21138 /21130
- ^{1} French Land Register data, which excludes lakes, ponds, glaciers > 1 km^{2} (0.386 sq mi or 247 acres) and river estuaries.

Champdôtre (French pronunciation: [ʃɑ̃dotʁ]) is a commune in the Côte-d'Or department in eastern France.

== Population ==
Historical population
Year	Pop.	±% p.a.
1968	482	—
1975	452	−0.91%
1982	474	+0.68%
1990	504	+0.77%
1999	548	+0.93%
2007	540	−0.18%
2012	577	+1.33%
2017	606	+0.99%
2023	600	−0.17%
Source: INSEE

== See also ==
- Communes of the Côte-d'Or department
