= Tellecey =

- Commune
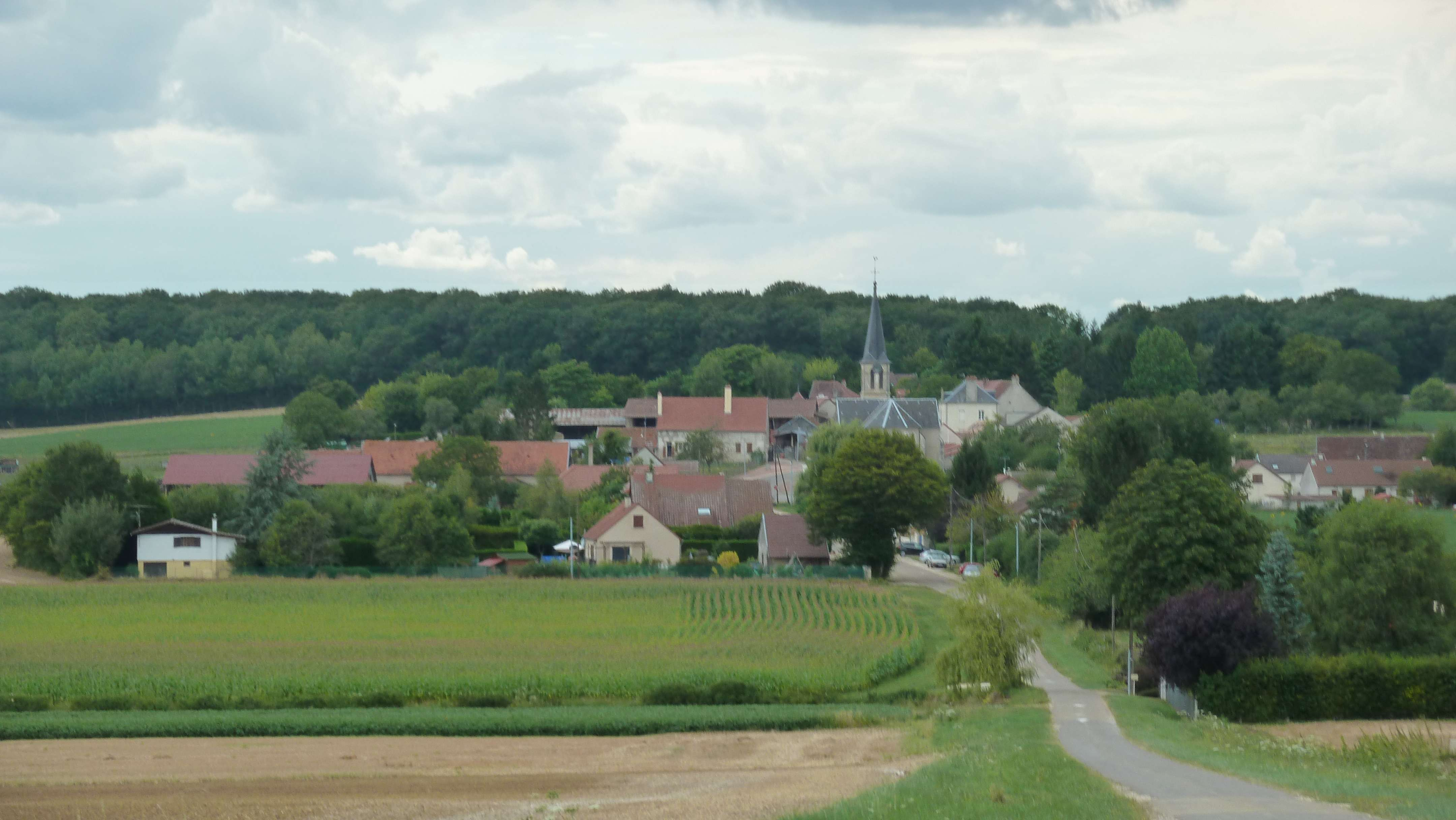
- The road into Tellecey

- Coat of arms
- Location of Tellecey
- Location within France Location within Bourgogne-Franche-Comté
- Coordinates: 47°17′41″N 5°16′55″E
- Country: France
- Region: Bourgogne-Franche-Comté
- Department: Côte-d'Or
- Arrondissement: Dijon
- Canton: Auxonne

Government
  - Mayor (2020–2026): Colette Lenoble
- Area^{1}: 5.07 km^{2} (1.96 sq mi)
- Elevation: 209 m (686 ft)
- Highest elevation: 238 m (781 ft)
- Lowest elevation: 193 m (633 ft)
- Population (2023): 143
  - Density: 28.2/km^{2} (73.1/sq mi)
- Time zone: UTC+01:00 (CET)
  - Summer (DST): UTC+02:00 (CEST)
- INSEE/Postal code: 21624 /21270
- ^{1} French Land Register data, which excludes lakes, ponds, glaciers > 1 km^{2} (0.386 sq mi or 247 acres) and river estuaries.

Tellecey (French pronunciation: [tɛlsɛ]) is a commune in the Côte-d'Or department in eastern France.

== Population ==
Historical population
Year	Pop.	±% p.a.
1968	59	—
1975	52	−1.79%
1982	68	+3.91%
1990	108	+5.95%
1999	134	+2.43%
2007	127	−0.67%
2012	143	+2.40%
2017	141	−0.28%
2023	143	+0.24%
Source: INSEE

== See also ==
- Communes of the Côte-d'Or department
