= Étevaux =

- Commune
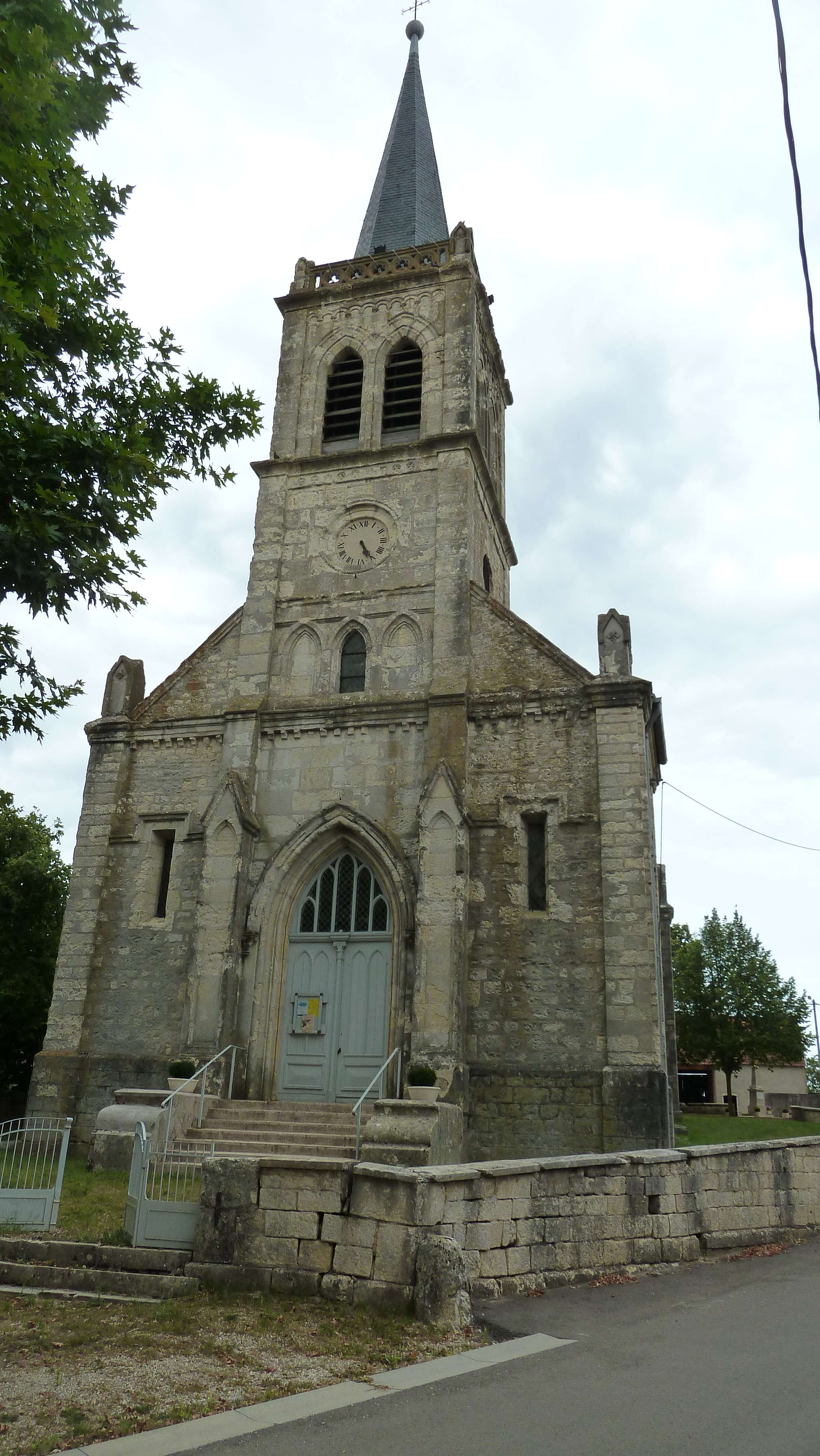
- The church in Étevaux

- Coat of arms
- Location of Étevaux
- Location within France Location within Bourgogne-Franche-Comté
- Coordinates: 47°19′23″N 5°19′06″E
- Country: France
- Region: Bourgogne-Franche-Comté
- Department: Côte-d'Or
- Arrondissement: Dijon
- Canton: Auxonne

Government
  - Mayor (2020–2026): Jean-Claude Rossin
- Area^{1}: 8.67 km^{2} (3.35 sq mi)
- Elevation: 230 m (750 ft)
- Highest elevation: 228 m (748 ft)
- Lowest elevation: 186 m (610 ft)
- Population (2023): 305
  - Density: 35.2/km^{2} (91.1/sq mi)
- Time zone: UTC+01:00 (CET)
  - Summer (DST): UTC+02:00 (CEST)
- INSEE/Postal code: 21256 /21270
- ^{1} French Land Register data, which excludes lakes, ponds, glaciers > 1 km^{2} (0.386 sq mi or 247 acres) and river estuaries.

Étevaux (French pronunciation: [etvo]) is a commune in the Côte-d'Or department in eastern France.

== Population ==
Historical population
Year	Pop.	±% p.a.
1968	162	—
1975	165	+0.26%
1982	206	+3.22%
1990	247	+2.29%
1999	259	+0.53%
2007	291	+1.47%
2012	302	+0.74%
2017	315	+0.85%
2023	305	−0.54%
Source: INSEE

== See also ==
- Communes of the Côte-d'Or department
