= Billey =

- Commune
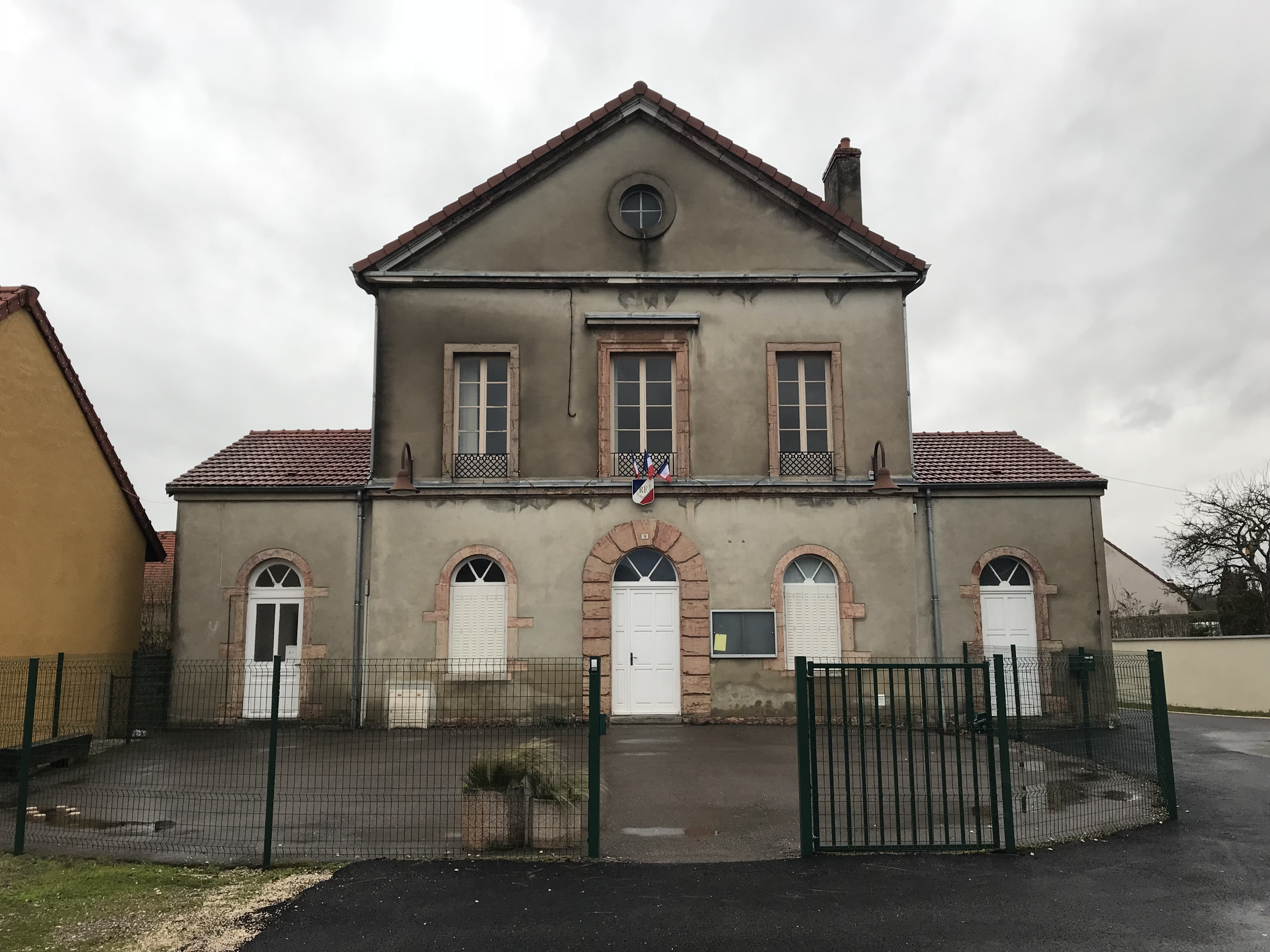
- The town hall in Billey

- Coat of arms
- Location of Billey
- Location within France Location within Bourgogne-Franche-Comté
- Coordinates: 47°08′45″N 5°25′57″E
- Country: France
- Region: Bourgogne-Franche-Comté
- Department: Côte-d'Or
- Arrondissement: Dijon
- Canton: Auxonne

Government
  - Mayor (2021–2026): Michel Bernier
- Area^{1}: 3.83 km^{2} (1.48 sq mi)
- Elevation: 186 m (610 ft)
- Highest elevation: 209 m (686 ft)
- Lowest elevation: 184 m (604 ft)
- Population (2023): 245
  - Density: 64.0/km^{2} (166/sq mi)
- Time zone: UTC+01:00 (CET)
  - Summer (DST): UTC+02:00 (CEST)
- INSEE/Postal code: 21074 /21130
- ^{1} French Land Register data, which excludes lakes, ponds, glaciers > 1 km^{2} (0.386 sq mi or 247 acres) and river estuaries.

Billey is a commune in the Côte-d'Or department in eastern France.

== Population ==
Historical population
Year	Pop.	±% p.a.
1968	123	—
1975	125	+0.23%
1982	157	+3.31%
1990	232	+5.00%
1999	205	−1.37%
2007	204	−0.06%
2012	231	+2.52%
2017	264	+2.71%
2023	245	−1.24%
Source: INSEE

== See also ==
- Communes of the Côte-d'Or department
