= Drambon =

- Commune
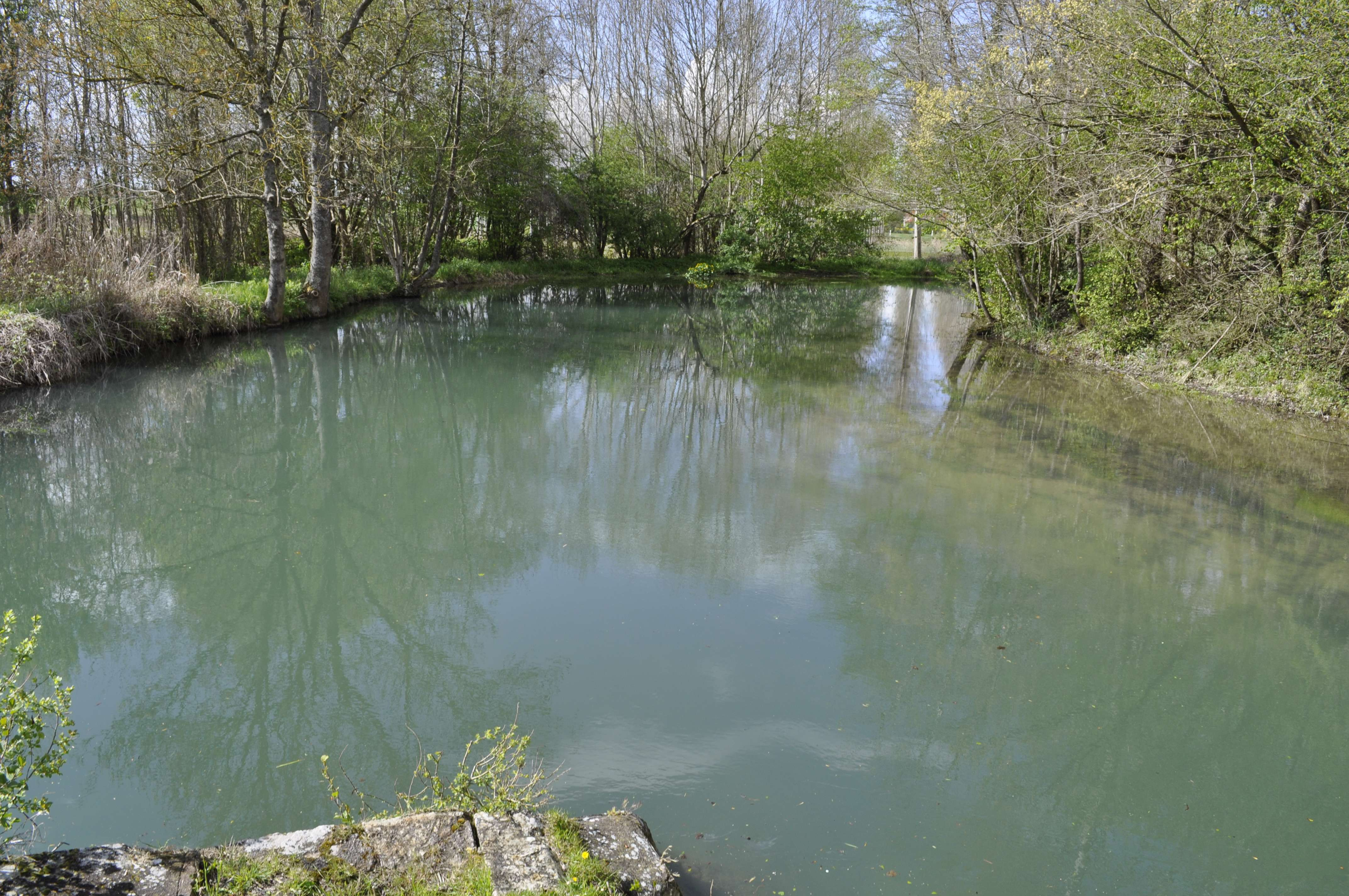
- The confluence of the Bèze and Alban rivers in Drambon

- Coat of arms
- Location of Drambon
- Location within France Location within Bourgogne-Franche-Comté
- Coordinates: 47°20′16″N 5°21′43″E
- Country: France
- Region: Bourgogne-Franche-Comté
- Department: Côte-d'Or
- Arrondissement: Dijon
- Canton: Auxonne

Government
  - Mayor (2020–2026): Michel Couturier
- Area^{1}: 4.77 km^{2} (1.84 sq mi)
- Elevation: 192 m (630 ft)
- Highest elevation: 207 m (679 ft)
- Lowest elevation: 186 m (610 ft)
- Population (2023): 179
  - Density: 37.5/km^{2} (97.2/sq mi)
- Time zone: UTC+01:00 (CET)
  - Summer (DST): UTC+02:00 (CEST)
- INSEE/Postal code: 21233 /21270
- ^{1} French Land Register data, which excludes lakes, ponds, glaciers > 1 km^{2} (0.386 sq mi or 247 acres) and river estuaries.

Drambon (French pronunciation: [dʁɑ̃bɔ̃]) is a commune in the Côte-d'Or department in eastern France.

== Population ==
Historical population
| Year | Pop. | ±% p.a. |
|---|---|---|
| 1968 | 104 | — |
| 1975 | 80 | −3.68% |
| 1982 | 79 | −0.18% |
| 1990 | 112 | +4.46% |
| 1999 | 139 | +2.43% |
| 2007 | 163 | +2.01% |
| 2012 | 165 | +0.24% |
| 2017 | 186 | +2.42% |
| 2023 | 179 | −0.64% |
Source: INSEE

== See also ==
- Communes of the Côte-d'Or department
