= Marandeuil =

- Commune
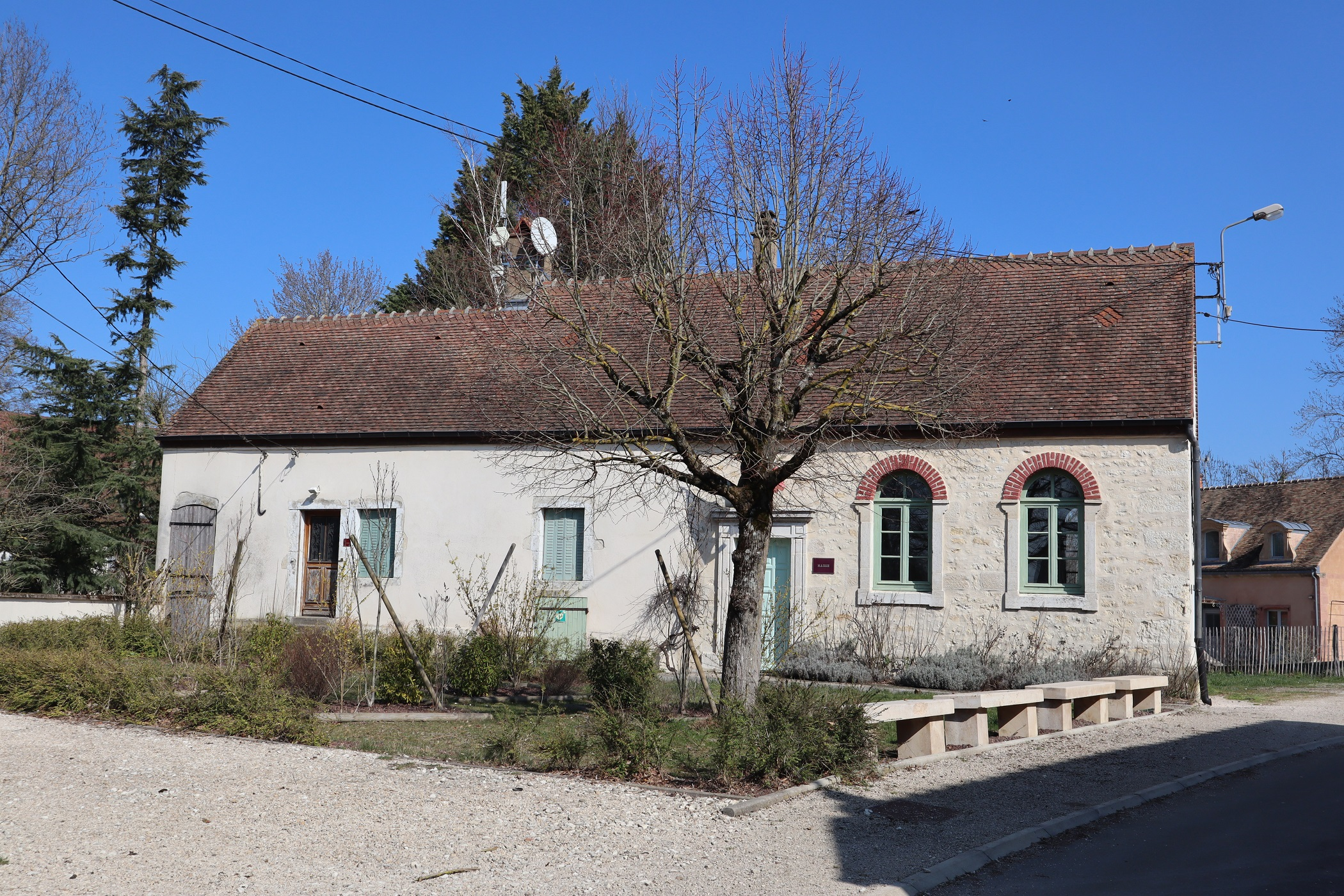
- Town hall
- Location of Marandeuil
- Location within France Location within Bourgogne-Franche-Comté
- Coordinates: 47°20′54″N 5°20′54″E
- Country: France
- Region: Bourgogne-Franche-Comté
- Department: Côte-d'Or
- Arrondissement: Dijon
- Canton: Auxonne

Government
  - Mayor (2020–2026): Denis Ciccardini
- Area^{1}: 4.55 km^{2} (1.76 sq mi)
- Elevation: 191 m (627 ft)
- Highest elevation: 202 m (663 ft)
- Lowest elevation: 188 m (617 ft)
- Population (2023): 100
  - Density: 22/km^{2} (57/sq mi)
- Time zone: UTC+01:00 (CET)
  - Summer (DST): UTC+02:00 (CEST)
- INSEE/Postal code: 21376 /21270
- ^{1} French Land Register data, which excludes lakes, ponds, glaciers > 1 km^{2} (0.386 sq mi or 247 acres) and river estuaries.

Marandeuil (French pronunciation: [maʁɑ̃dœj]) is a commune in the Côte-d'Or department in eastern France.

== Population ==
Historical population
Year	Pop.	±% p.a.
1968	41	—
1975	41	+0.00%
1982	38	−1.08%
1990	58	+5.43%
1999	51	−1.42%
2007	66	+3.28%
2012	127	+13.99%
2017	113	−2.31%
2023	100	−2.02%
Source: INSEE

== See also ==
- Communes of the Côte-d'Or department
