= Pont, Côte-d'Or =

Pont
- Commune
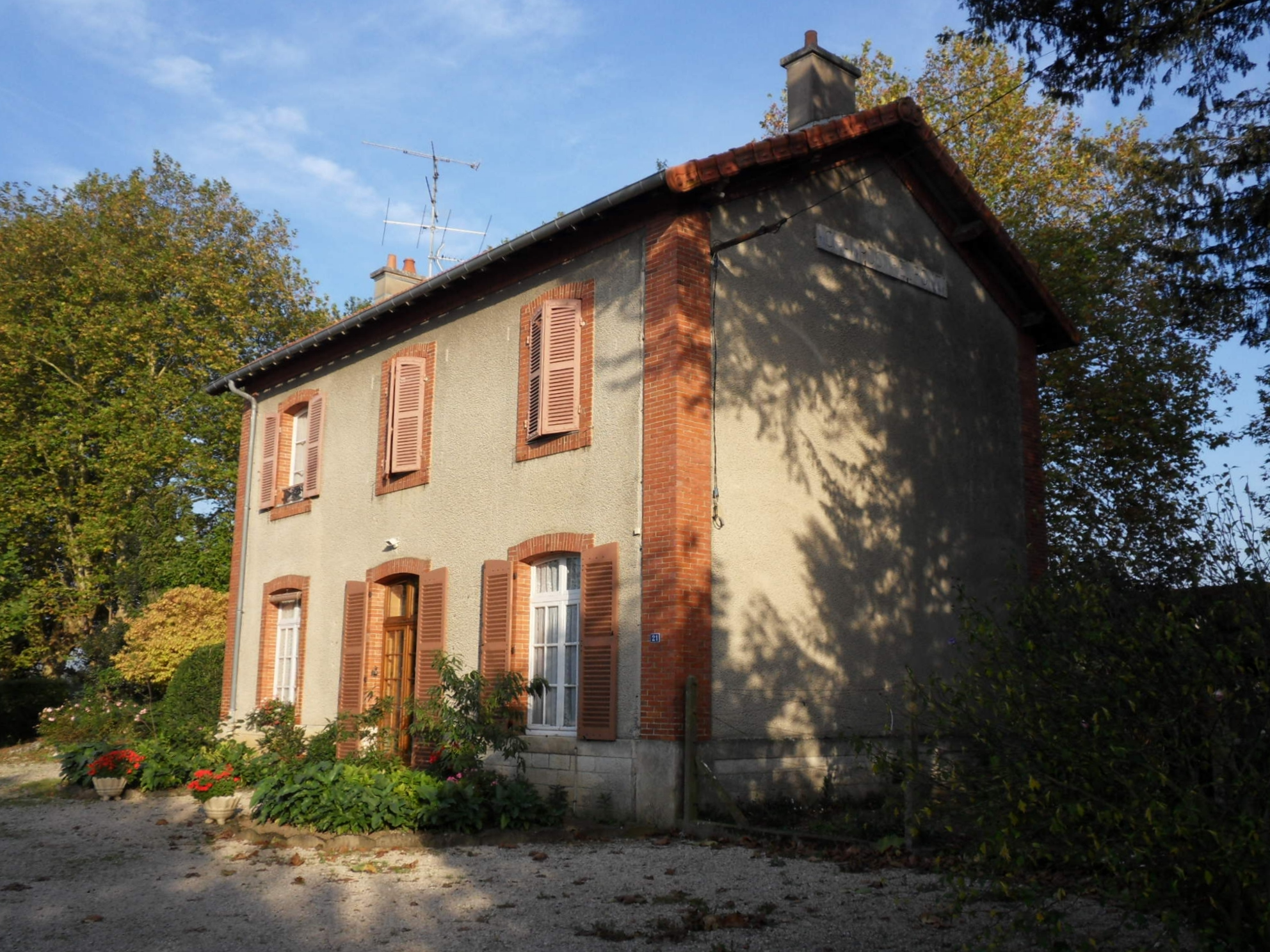
- Champdotre-Pont train station

- Coat of arms
- Location of Pont
- Location within France Location within Bourgogne-Franche-Comté
- Coordinates: 47°10′38″N 5°19′00″E
- Country: France
- Region: Bourgogne-Franche-Comté
- Department: Côte-d'Or
- Arrondissement: Dijon
- Canton: Auxonne

Government
  - Mayor (2020–2026): Daniel Marechal
- Area^{1}: 3.49 km^{2} (1.35 sq mi)
- Elevation: 189 m (620 ft)
- Highest elevation: 202 m (663 ft)
- Lowest elevation: 183 m (600 ft)
- Population (2023): 157
  - Density: 45.0/km^{2} (117/sq mi)
- Time zone: UTC+01:00 (CET)
  - Summer (DST): UTC+02:00 (CEST)
- INSEE/Postal code: 21495 /21130
- ^{1} French Land Register data, which excludes lakes, ponds, glaciers > 1 km^{2} (0.386 sq mi or 247 acres) and river estuaries.

Pont (French pronunciation: [pɔ̃]) is a commune in the Côte-d'Or department in eastern France.

== Population ==
Historical population
Year	Pop.	±% p.a.
1968	87	—
1975	91	+0.64%
1982	84	−1.14%
1990	83	−0.15%
1999	87	+0.52%
2007	92	+0.70%
2012	101	+1.88%
2017	141	+6.90%
2023	157	+1.81%
Source: INSEE

== See also ==
- Communes of the Côte-d'Or department
