= Perrigny-sur-l'Ognon =

- Commune
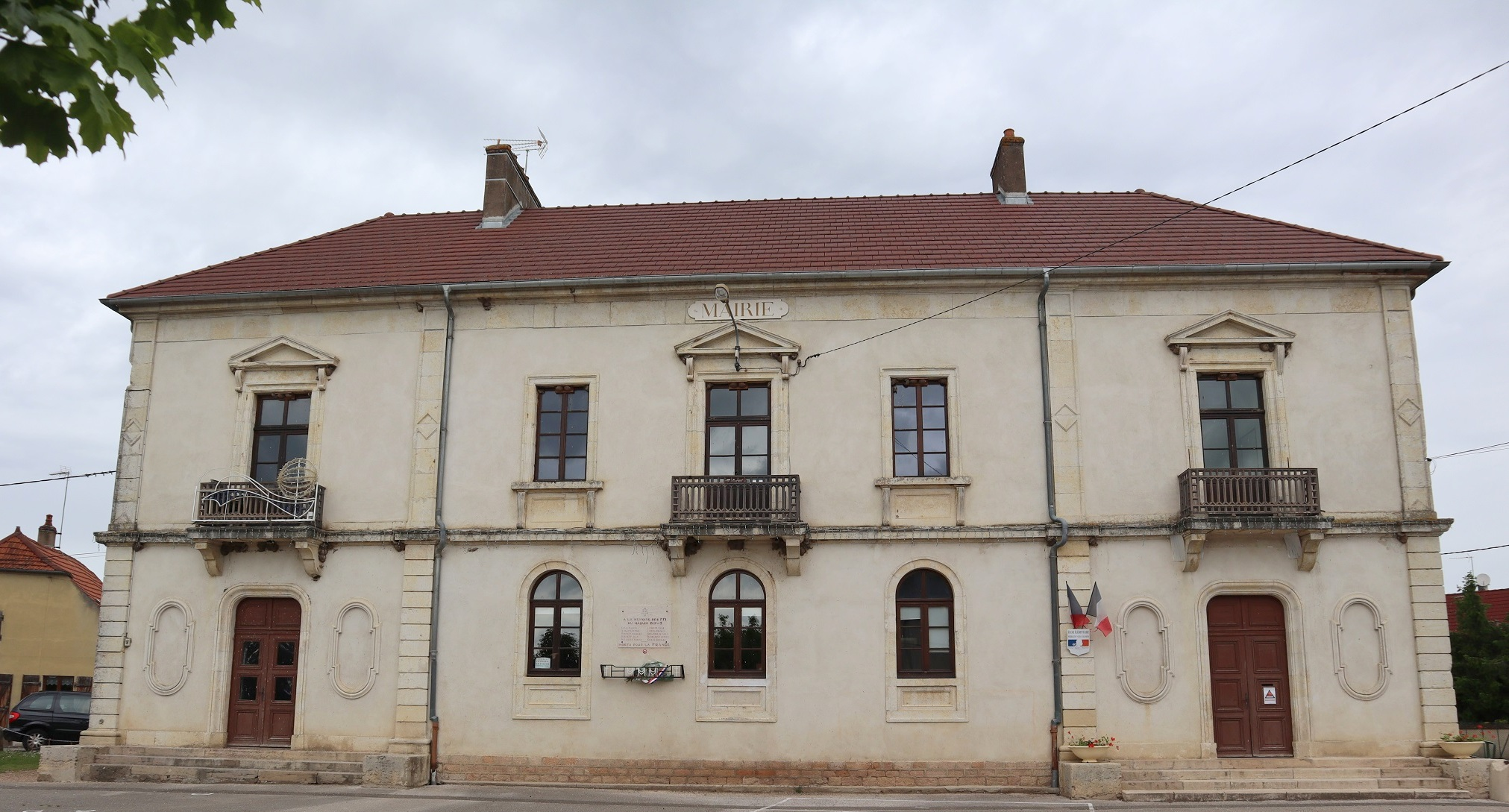
- Town hall
- Location of Perrigny-sur-l'Ognon
- Location within France Location within Bourgogne-Franche-Comté
- Coordinates: 47°18′43″N 5°26′56″E
- Country: France
- Region: Bourgogne-Franche-Comté
- Department: Côte-d'Or
- Arrondissement: Dijon
- Canton: Auxonne

Government
  - Mayor (2020–2026): Jean-Paul Delfour
- Area^{1}: 18.92 km^{2} (7.31 sq mi)
- Elevation: 200 m (660 ft)
- Highest elevation: 206 m (676 ft)
- Lowest elevation: 183 m (600 ft)
- Population (2023): 655
  - Density: 34.6/km^{2} (89.7/sq mi)
- Time zone: UTC+01:00 (CET)
  - Summer (DST): UTC+02:00 (CEST)
- INSEE/Postal code: 21482 /21270
- ^{1} French Land Register data, which excludes lakes, ponds, glaciers > 1 km^{2} (0.386 sq mi or 247 acres) and river estuaries.

Perrigny-sur-l'Ognon (French pronunciation: [pɛʁiɲi syʁ lɔɲɔ̃], literally Perrigny on the Ognon) is a commune in the Côte-d'Or department in eastern France.

== Population ==
Historical population
Year	Pop.	±% p.a.
1968	433	—
1975	422	−0.37%
1982	461	+1.27%
1990	483	+0.58%
1999	496	+0.30%
2007	646	+3.36%
2012	677	+0.94%
2017	646	−0.93%
2023	655	+0.23%
Source: INSEE

== See also ==
- Communes of the Côte-d'Or department
