= Flagey-lès-Auxonne =

- Commune
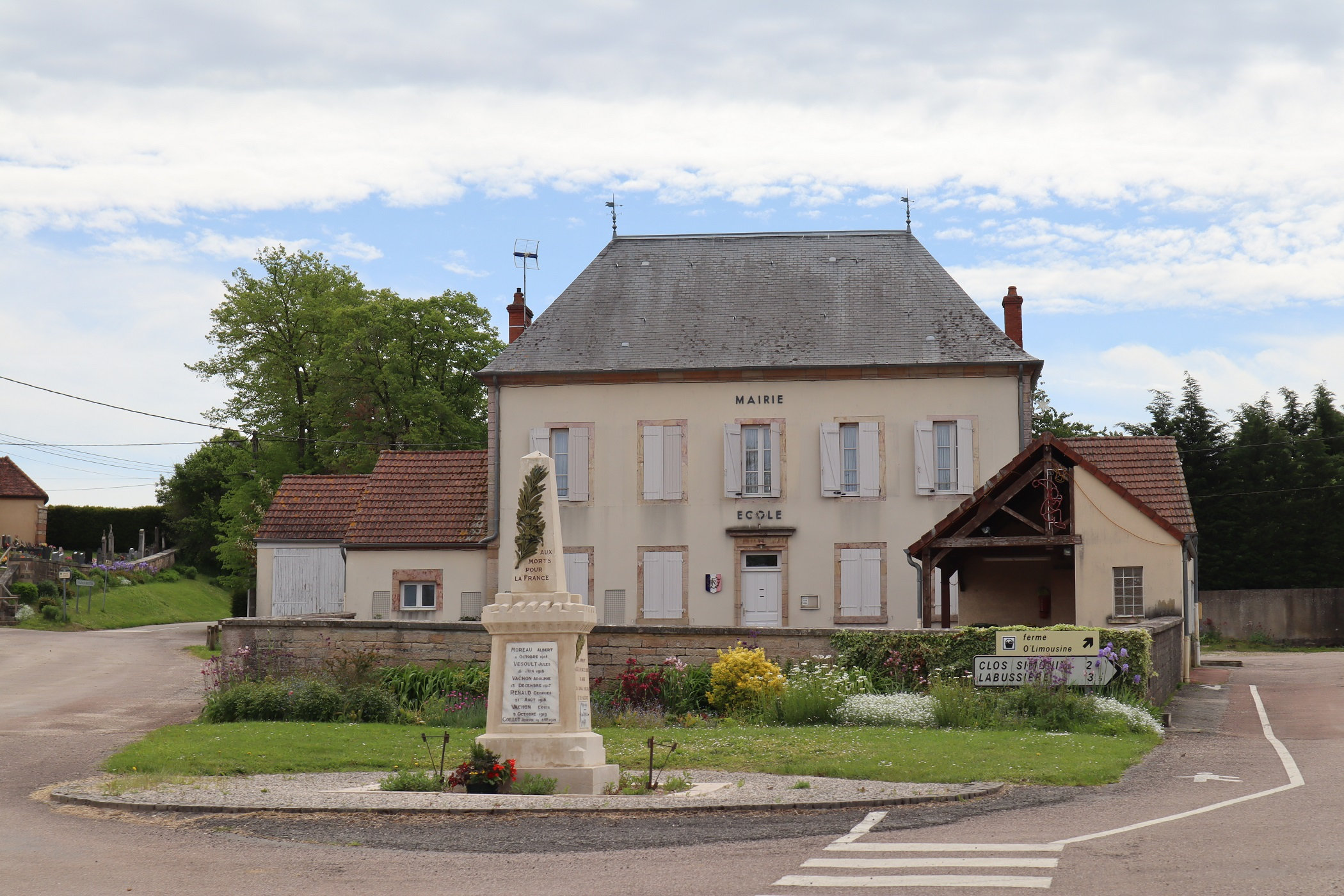
- Flagey-lès-Auxonne Town hall

- Coat of arms
- Location of Flagey-lès-Auxonne
- Location within France Location within Bourgogne-Franche-Comté
- Coordinates: 47°08′50″N 5°23′25″E
- Country: France
- Region: Bourgogne-Franche-Comté
- Department: Côte-d'Or
- Arrondissement: Dijon
- Canton: Auxonne
- Intercommunality: Auxonne Pontailler Val de Saône

Government
  - Mayor (2020–2026): Patrice Béché
- Area^{1}: 7.91 km^{2} (3.05 sq mi)
- Elevation: 186 m (610 ft)
- Highest elevation: 209 m (686 ft)
- Lowest elevation: 180 m (590 ft)
- Population (2023): 214
  - Density: 27.1/km^{2} (70.1/sq mi)
- Time zone: UTC+01:00 (CET)
  - Summer (DST): UTC+02:00 (CEST)
- INSEE/Postal code: 21268 /21130
- ^{1} French Land Register data, which excludes lakes, ponds, glaciers > 1 km^{2} (0.386 sq mi or 247 acres) and river estuaries.

Flagey-lès-Auxonne (French pronunciation: [flaʒɛ lɛ.z‿oksɔn], literally Flagey near Auxonne) is a commune in the Côte-d'Or department and Bourgogne-Franche-Comté region of eastern France.

== Population ==
Historical population
| Year | Pop. | ±% p.a. |
|---|---|---|
| 1968 | 117 | — |
| 1975 | 131 | +1.63% |
| 1982 | 159 | +2.81% |
| 1990 | 148 | −0.89% |
| 1999 | 163 | +1.08% |
| 2007 | 176 | +0.96% |
| 2012 | 200 | +2.59% |
| 2017 | 194 | −0.61% |
| 2023 | 214 | +1.65% |
Source: INSEE

== See also ==
- Communes of the Côte-d'Or department
