= Pontailler-sur-Saône =

- Commune
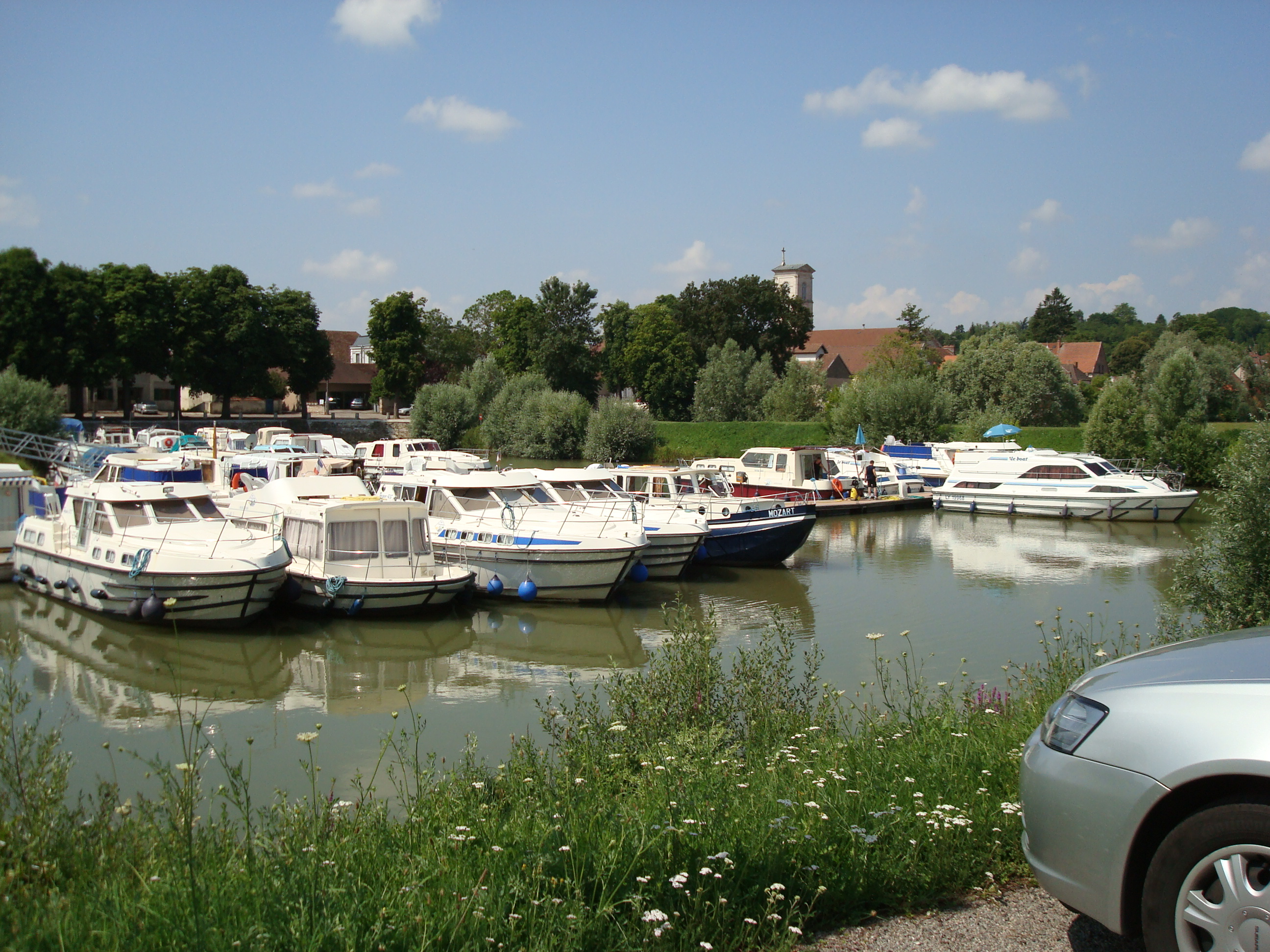
- The marina of Pontailler-sur-Saône

- Coat of arms
- Location of Pontailler-sur-Saône
- Location within France Location within Bourgogne-Franche-Comté
- Coordinates: 47°18′26″N 5°24′45″E
- Country: France
- Region: Bourgogne-Franche-Comté
- Department: Côte-d'Or
- Arrondissement: Dijon
- Canton: Auxonne

Government
  - Mayor (2020–2026): Marie-Claire Bonnet-Vallet
- Area^{1}: 13.17 km^{2} (5.08 sq mi)
- Elevation: 187 m (614 ft)
- Highest elevation: 226 m (741 ft)
- Lowest elevation: 182 m (597 ft)
- Population (2023): 1,277
  - Density: 96.96/km^{2} (251.1/sq mi)
- Time zone: UTC+01:00 (CET)
  - Summer (DST): UTC+02:00 (CEST)
- INSEE/Postal code: 21496 /21270
- ^{1} French Land Register data, which excludes lakes, ponds, glaciers > 1 km^{2} (0.386 sq mi or 247 acres) and river estuaries.

Pontailler-sur-Saône (French pronunciation: [pɔ̃taje syʁ son], literally Pontailler on Saône) is a commune in the Côte-d'Or department in eastern France.

== Population ==
Historical population
Year	Pop.	±% p.a.
1968	1,119	—
1975	1,310	+2.28%
1982	1,370	+0.64%
1990	1,318	−0.48%
1999	1,346	+0.23%
2007	1,293	−0.50%
2012	1,251	−0.66%
2017	1,308	+0.90%
2023	1,277	−0.40%
Source: INSEE

== See also ==
- Communes of the Côte-d'Or department
