= Canton of Auxonne =

Coordinates: 47.19°N 5.39°E

The canton of Auxonne is an administrative division of the Côte-d'Or department, eastern France. Its borders were modified at the French canton reorganisation, which came into effect in March 2015. Its seat is in Auxonne.

It consists of the following communes:

1. Athée
2. Auxonne
3. Billey
4. Binges
5. Champdôtre
6. Cirey-lès-Pontailler
7. Cléry
8. Drambon
9. Étevaux
10. Flagey-lès-Auxonne
11. Flammerans
12. Heuilley-sur-Saône
13. Labergement-lès-Auxonne
14. Lamarche-sur-Saône
15. Magny-Montarlot
16. Les Maillys
17. Marandeuil
18. Maxilly-sur-Saône
19. Montmançon
20. Perrigny-sur-l'Ognon
21. Poncey-lès-Athée
22. Pont
23. Pontailler-sur-Saône
24. Saint-Léger-Triey
25. Saint-Sauveur
26. Soirans
27. Soissons-sur-Nacey
28. Talmay
29. Tellecey
30. Tillenay
31. Tréclun
32. Vielverge
33. Villers-les-Pots
34. Villers-Rotin
35. Vonges
