= Chassagne =

Chassagne, La Chassagne and de la Chassagne may refer to:

== Toponyme ==
- Chassagne, Puy-de-Dôme, commune in Puy-de-Dôme
- Chassagne-Montrachet, commune in Côte-d'Or
- Chassagne-Saint-Denis, commune in Doubs
- La Chassagne, commune in Jura
- La Chassagne, lieu-dit in Ladapeyre, Creuse
- La Chassagne, lieu-dit in Onnens, Vaud, Switzerland

== People ==
- Jean Chassagne (1881–1947), French racing driver
- Micheline Chassagne, better known as Micheline Presle, French actress
- Paul Chassagne (born 1932), French biathlete
- Raymond Chassagne (1924–2013), Haitian poet
- Régine Chassagne (born 1977), Canadian musician and singer
- Yvette Chassagne (1922–2007), French politician and official

== Architecture ==
- Château de la Chassagne, a castle in the commune of Saint-Vincent-Bragny, Saône-et-Loire, France
- Château de la Chassagne, a castle in the commune of Neuville-les-Dames, Ain, France
- Château de la Chassagne, a castle in Saint-Hilaire-le-Château, Creuse, Nouvelle-Aquitaine, France
- Château la Chassagne, a castle in the communes of Fleurey-sur-Ouche and Sainte-Marie-sur-Ouche, Côte-d'Or, France
- Château la Chassagne, a castle in the commune of Ladapeyre, Creuse, Nouvelle-Aquitaine, France
- Église Saint-Pierre de Chassagne, a Roman Catholic church in the commune of Chassagne, Puy-de-Dôme, France
- Tour Chassagne, one of two office skyscrapers located in La Défense, Nanterre, Hauts-de-Seine, Paris, France

== See also ==
- 15037 Chassagne, asteroid
- Chassagne-Montrachet wine, wine from the communes of Chassagne-Montrachet and Remigny in Côte de Beaune of Burgundy
