= Ancey =

- Commune
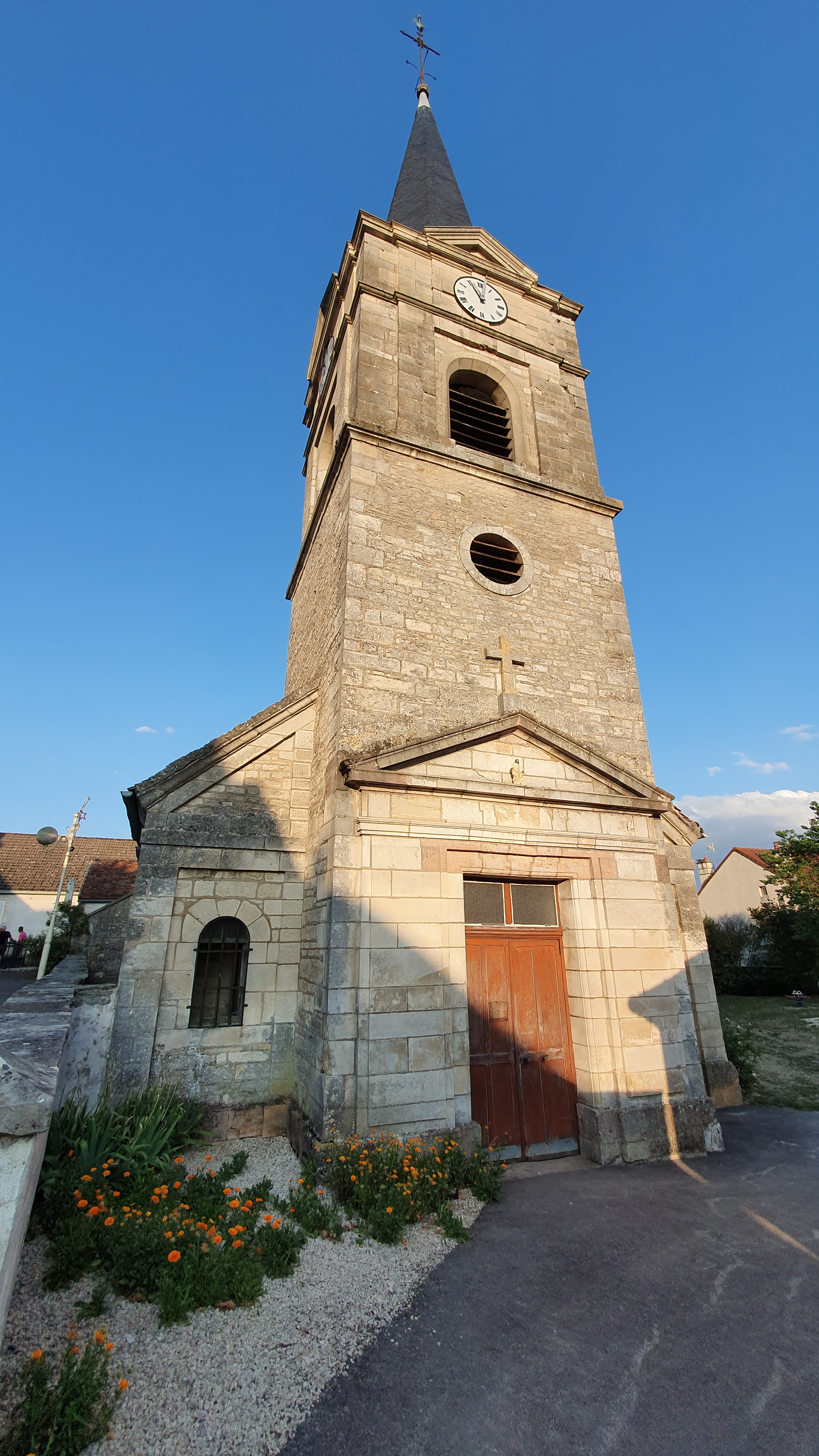
- The Nativity Church in Ancey

- Coat of arms
- Location of Ancey
- Location within France Location within Bourgogne-Franche-Comté
- Coordinates: 47°19′48″N 4°49′39″E
- Country: France
- Region: Bourgogne-Franche-Comté
- Department: Côte-d'Or
- Arrondissement: Dijon
- Canton: Talant
- Intercommunality: Ouche et Montagne

Government
  - Mayor (2020–2026): Benjamin Vasseur
- Area^{1}: 8.47 km^{2} (3.27 sq mi)
- Elevation: 280 m (920 ft)
- Highest elevation: 603 m (1,978 ft)
- Lowest elevation: 285 m (935 ft)
- Population (2023): 451
  - Density: 53.2/km^{2} (138/sq mi)
- Time zone: UTC+01:00 (CET)
  - Summer (DST): UTC+02:00 (CEST)
- INSEE/Postal code: 21013 /21410
- ^{1} French Land Register data, which excludes lakes, ponds, glaciers > 1 km^{2} (0.386 sq mi or 247 acres) and river estuaries.

Ancey (French pronunciation: [ɑ̃sɛ]) is a commune in the Côte-d'Or department in the Bourgogne-Franche-Comté region of eastern France.

== Geography ==
Ancey is located some 25 km west of Dijon and 2 km north of Sainte-Marie-sur-Ouche. It can be accessed by the D104C road from Malain in the west passing south of the village eastwards to Lantenay. The D104L also comes from Fleurey-sur-Ouche in the south-east. The village is located north of the D104C and can be accessed by several country roads. The railway line from Dijon passes through the commune from east to west south of the village but the nearest station is just outside the commune to the west. Most of the commune north of the village is heavily forested however south of the village is mostly farmland.

Although the Canal de Bourgogne passes to the south of the commune there are no identifiable waterways in the commune.

== History ==
=== Heraldry ===
Arms of Ancey	Blazon: Azure, saltire in argent cantoned with 4 martlets in Or.

== Administration ==
List of Successive Mayors

From	To	Name
2001	2014	Armand Viellard
2014	2020	Claude Crouzet
2020	2026	Benjamin Vasseur

== Demography ==
The inhabitants of the commune are known as Anceyéens or Anceyéennes in French.

Historical population

Year	Pop.	±% p.a.
1793	397	—
1821	475	+0.64%
1846	533	+0.46%
1872	380	−1.29%
1901	387	+0.06%
1926	351	−0.39%
1946	298	−0.82%
1962	246	−1.19%
1968	244	−0.14%

Year	Pop.	±% p.a.
1975	217	−1.66%
1982	254	+2.27%
1990	297	+1.97%
1999	345	+1.68%
2007	377	+1.11%
2012	402	+1.29%
2017	442	+1.92%
2023	451	+0.34%

Source: EHESS and INSEE

== Culture and heritage ==
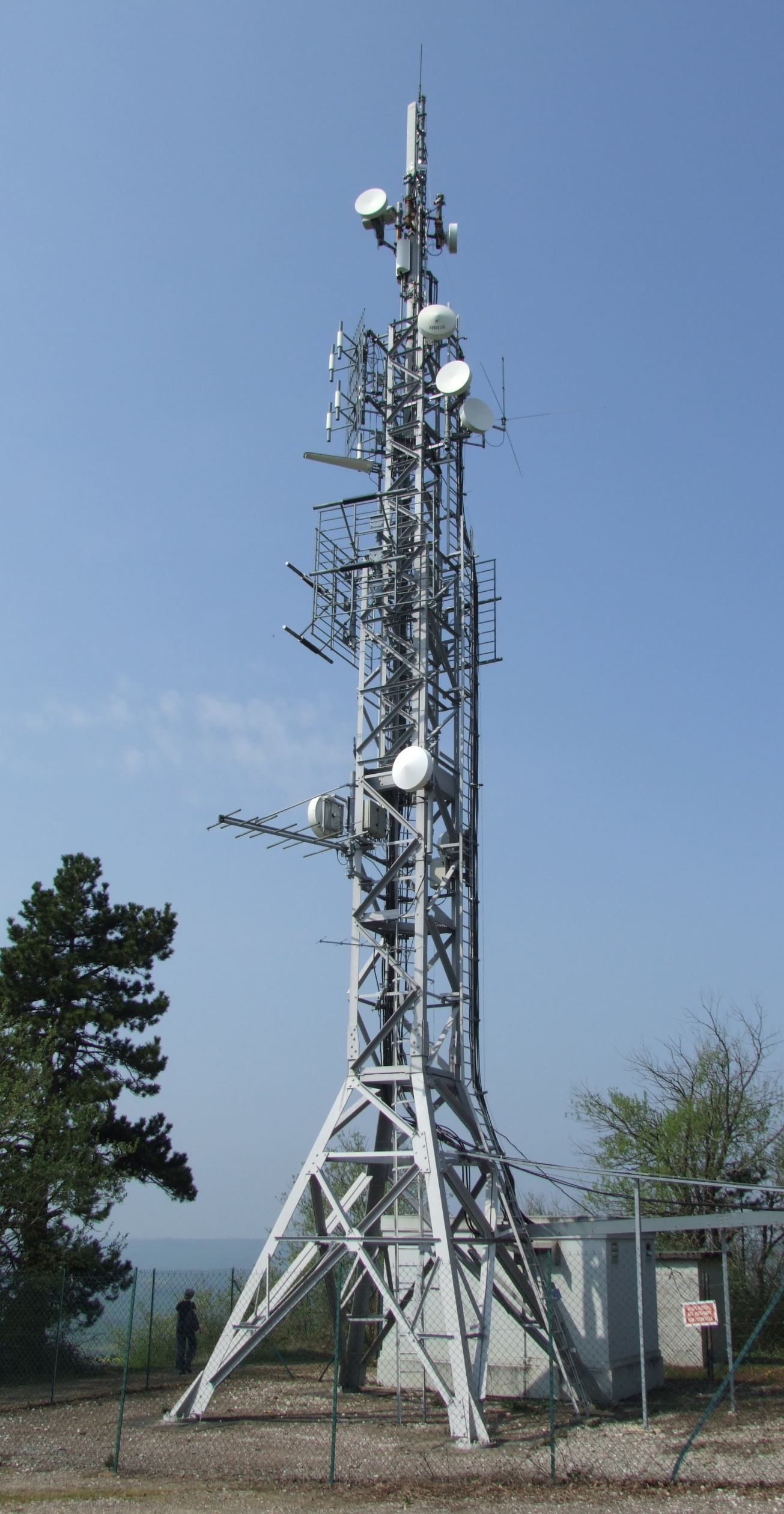
Ancey relay antenna

=== Civil heritage ===
The commune has many buildings and structures that are registered as historical monuments:

- A Farmhouse (1) (1623)
- A Farmhouse (2) (1760)
- A Farmhouse (3) (1815)
- A Farmhouse (4) (18th century)
- A Farmhouse (5) (1790)
- A House (1) (1769)
- A House (2) (1781)
- A House (3) (18th century)
- A House (4) (18th century)
- A House (5) (19th century)
- A House (6) (19th century)
- A House (7) (18th century)
- A House (8) (19th century)
- A House (9) (1846)
- A House at Rue d'Amont (19th century)
- A House (10) (18th century)
- A House (11) (19th century)
- A House (12) (18th century)
- A House at Chemin de Panges (1824)
- Houses and Farms (17th-19th centuries)

=== Religious heritage ===
The commune has three religious sites that are registered as historical monuments:

- A Wayside Cross at Route de Mâlain (1810)
- A Monumental Cross (19th century)
- The Parish Church of the Nativity (1545). The Church contains many items that are registered as historical objects:
  - A Reliquary of Sainte-Brigide (16th century)
  - A Commemorative Plaque (1787)
  - A set of 2 Crosses of Consecration (16th century)
  - A Fresco: Adoration of the Magi (16th century)
  - Pews, Wall Lamp, a bench, and a door (1791)
  - A Processional Staff: Virgin and child (18th century)
  - A Processional Staff: Saint Vincent (19th century)
  - A Processional Cross (18th century)
  - A Processional Staff: Sainte Brigide (17th century)
  - 2 Paintings: The Adoration of the Shepherds and the Adoration of the Magi (1654)
  - A Statue: Saint évêque (17th century)
  - A Statue: Virgin and child (18th century)
  - A Confessional (19th century)
  - A Pulpit (18th century)
  - The Furniture in the Church
  - A Mural: Virgin of the Assumption (19th century)
  - An Altar, Retable, and Tabernacle (18th century)

== See also ==
- Communes of the Côte-d'Or department
