= Arcey =

Arcey may refer to the following places in France:

- Arcey, Côte-d'Or, a commune in the department of Côte-d'Or
- Arcey, Doubs, a commune in the department of Doubs
