= Baulme-la-Roche =

- Commune
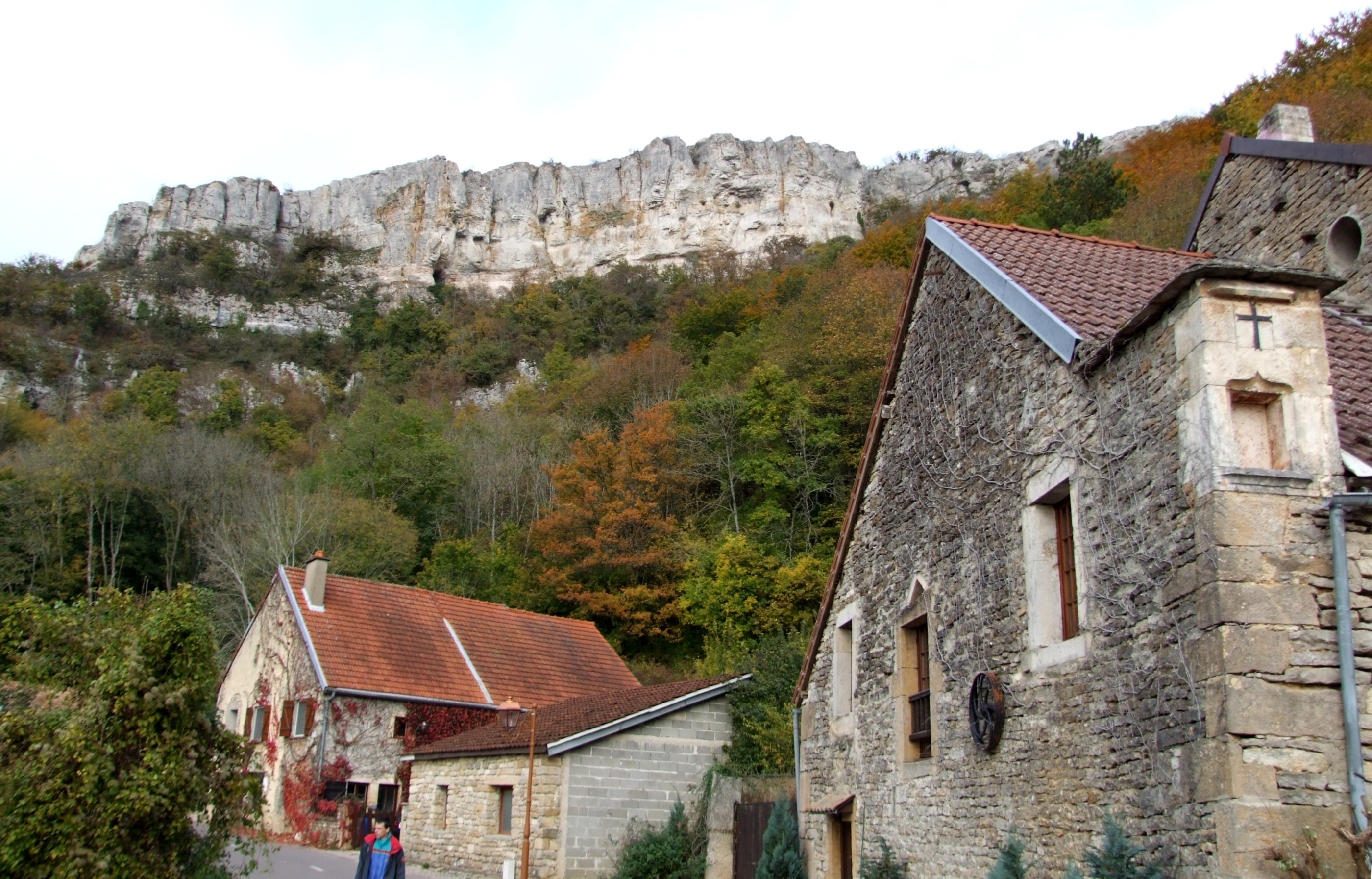
- A general view of Baulme-la-Roche

- Coat of arms
- Location of Baulme-la-Roche
- Location within France Location within Bourgogne-Franche-Comté
- Coordinates: 47°20′48″N 4°47′59″E
- Country: France
- Region: Bourgogne-Franche-Comté
- Department: Côte-d'Or
- Arrondissement: Dijon
- Canton: Talant
- Intercommunality: Ouche et Montagne

Government
  - Mayor (2020–2026): Raphaël Véjux
- Area^{1}: 6.69 km^{2} (2.58 sq mi)
- Elevation: 450 m (1,480 ft)
- Highest elevation: 596 m (1,955 ft)
- Lowest elevation: 360 m (1,180 ft)
- Population (2023): 93
  - Density: 14/km^{2} (36/sq mi)
- Time zone: UTC+01:00 (CET)
  - Summer (DST): UTC+02:00 (CEST)
- INSEE/Postal code: 21051 /21410
- ^{1} French Land Register data, which excludes lakes, ponds, glaciers > 1 km^{2} (0.386 sq mi or 247 acres) and river estuaries.

Baulme-la-Roche (French pronunciation: [bo(l)m la ʁɔʃ]) is a commune in the Côte-d'Or department in the Bourgogne-Franche-Comté region of eastern France.

The inhabitants of the commune are known as Rochebalmiens or Rochebalmiennes.

== Geography ==
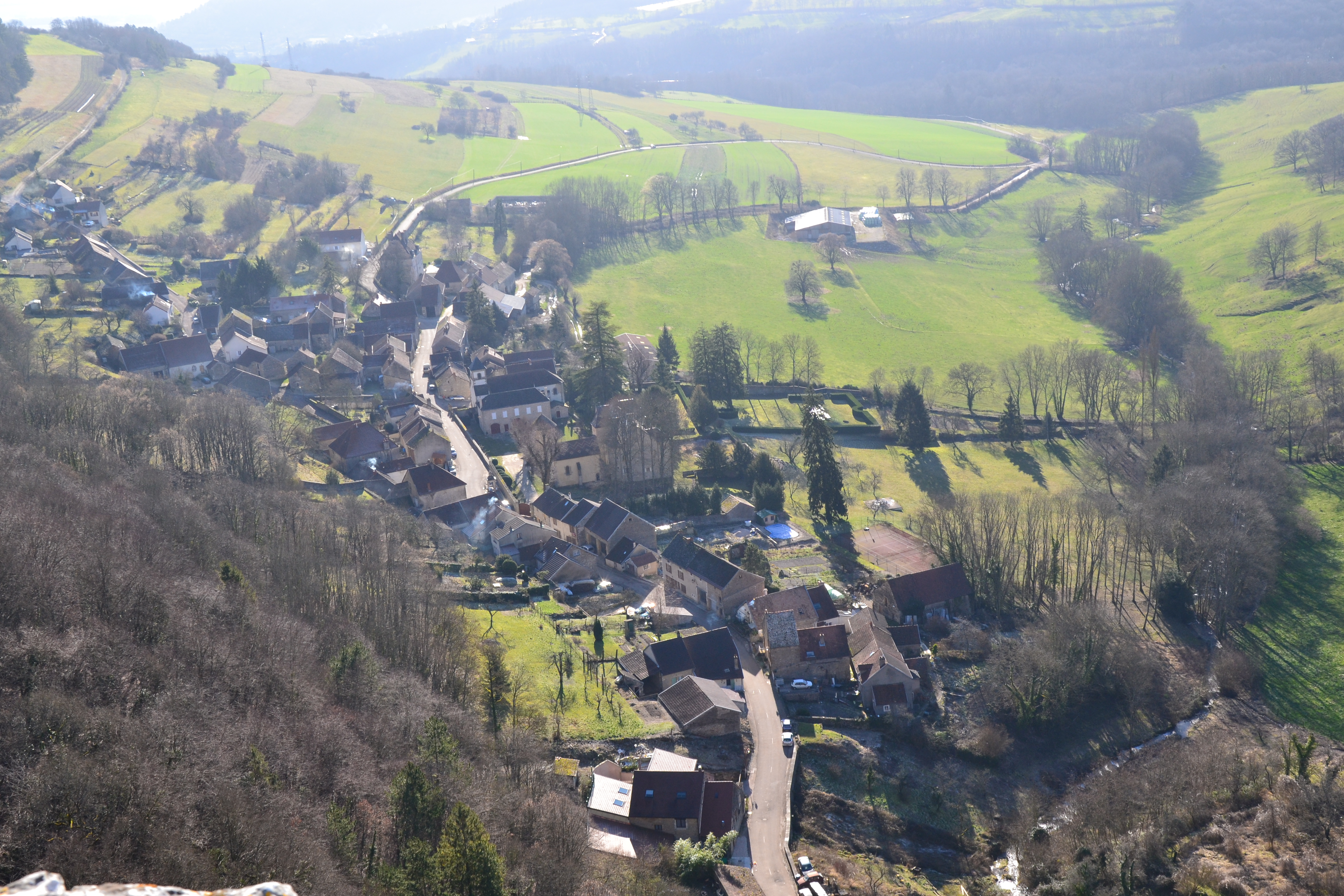
View of the commune

Baulme-la-Roche is located some 17 km west by north-west of Dijon and 8 km north-east of Sombernon. Access to the commune is by the D104C from Mâlain in the south which passes through the commune and the village and continues north-east to join the D10 south-east of Panges. The Paris–Marseille railway passes through the commune and the entrance to the Blaisy-Bas Tunnel is in the commune. The nearest station is at Malain south of the commune. The commune is mostly farmland but there are extensive forests - especially in the east.

The Douix river rises in the west of the commune and flows south-east to join the Ouche east of Sainte-Marie-sur-Ouche. The Ruisseau de Baulme-la-Roche rises in the centre of the commune and flows south-west to join the Douix.

== Toponymy ==
Baulme-la-Roche appears as Beaume la Roche on the 1750 Cassini Map and the same on the 1790 version.

=== Heraldry ===
Arms of Baulme-la-Roche	Blazon: Party per fess, at 1 party per pale, Argent a cross Gules charged with 5 roses and Azure a dexter arm carnation vested Argent holds a crozier of Or; at 2 Azure, a mountain of 3 hillocks of Or; all debruised by a barrulet on the division charged with a fess wavy of Azure.

== Administration ==
List of Successive Mayors

From	To	Name
2001	2011	Gisèle Monot
2011	2014	Jean Luc Gourdin
2014	2026	Raphaël Véjux

== Demography ==
Historical population

Year	Pop.	±% p.a.
1793	357	—
1821	314	−0.46%
1846	393	+0.90%
1872	198	−2.60%
1901	177	−0.39%
1926	170	−0.16%
1946	139	−1.00%
1962	120	−0.91%
1968	106	−2.05%

Year	Pop.	±% p.a.
1975	77	−4.46%
1982	88	+1.93%
1990	100	+1.61%
1999	118	+1.86%
2007	125	+0.72%
2012	108	−2.88%
2017	90	−3.58%
2023	93	+0.55%

Source: EHESS and INSEE

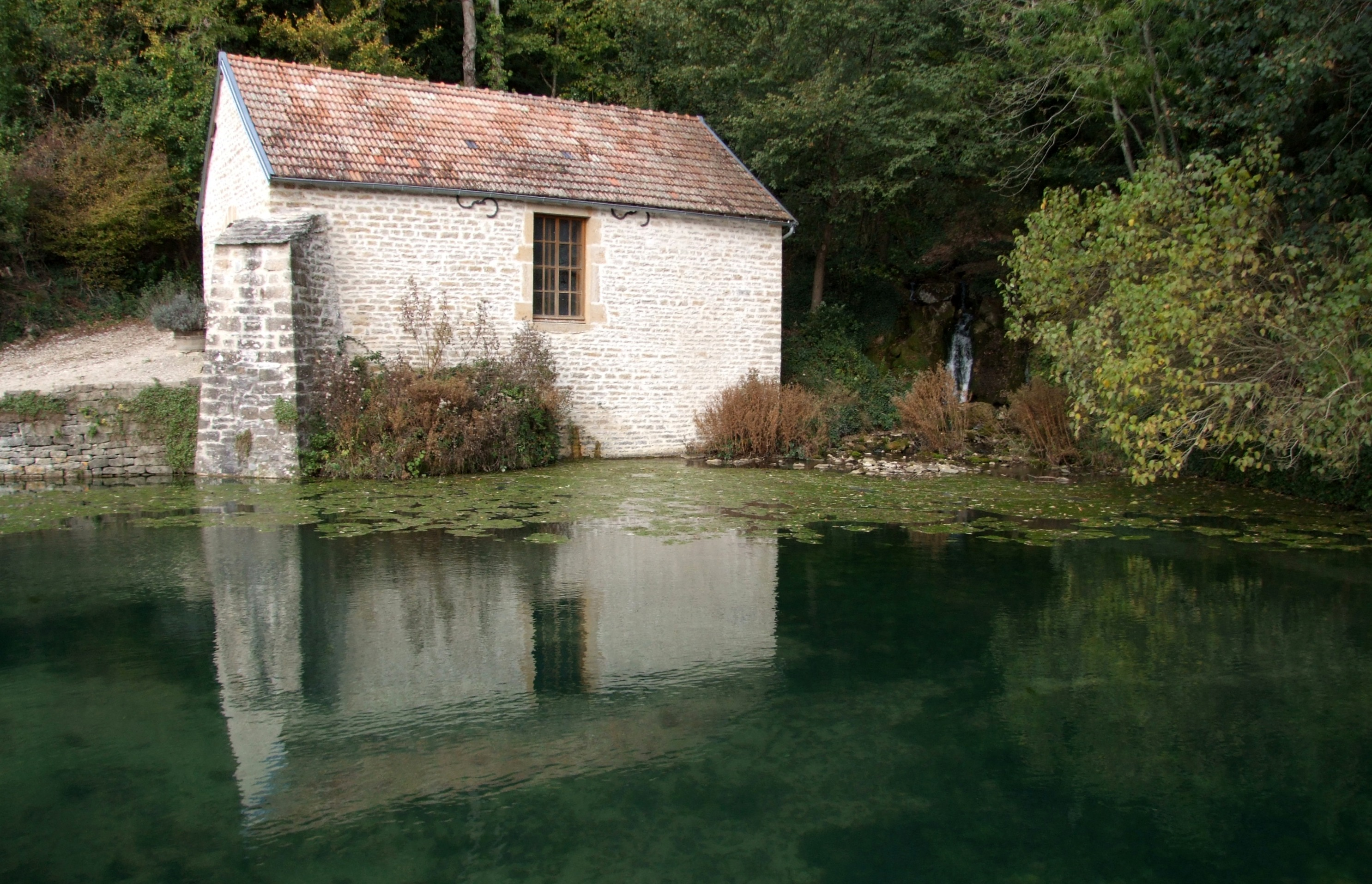
Baulme-la-Roche

== Culture and heritage ==
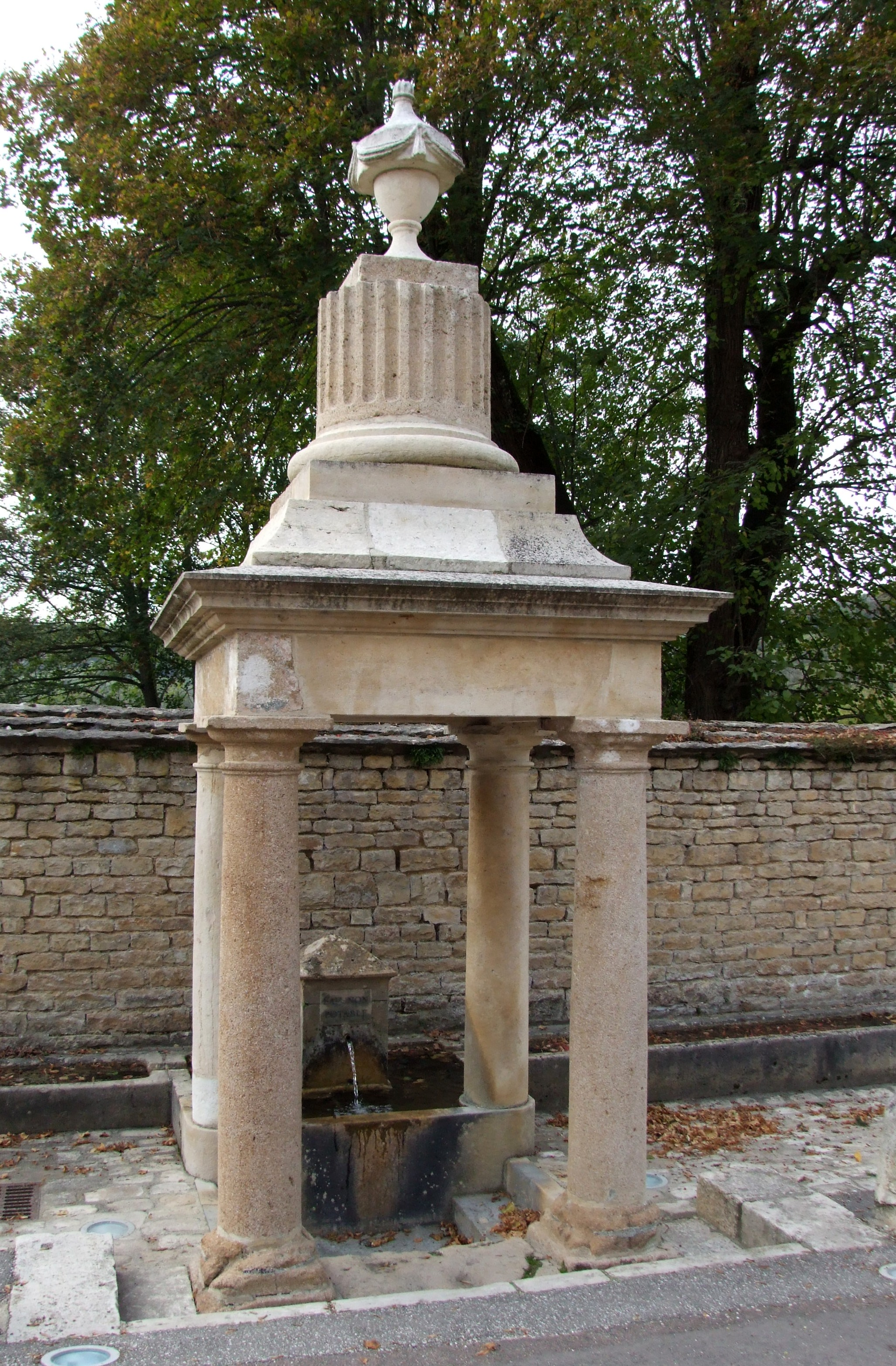
The Fountain

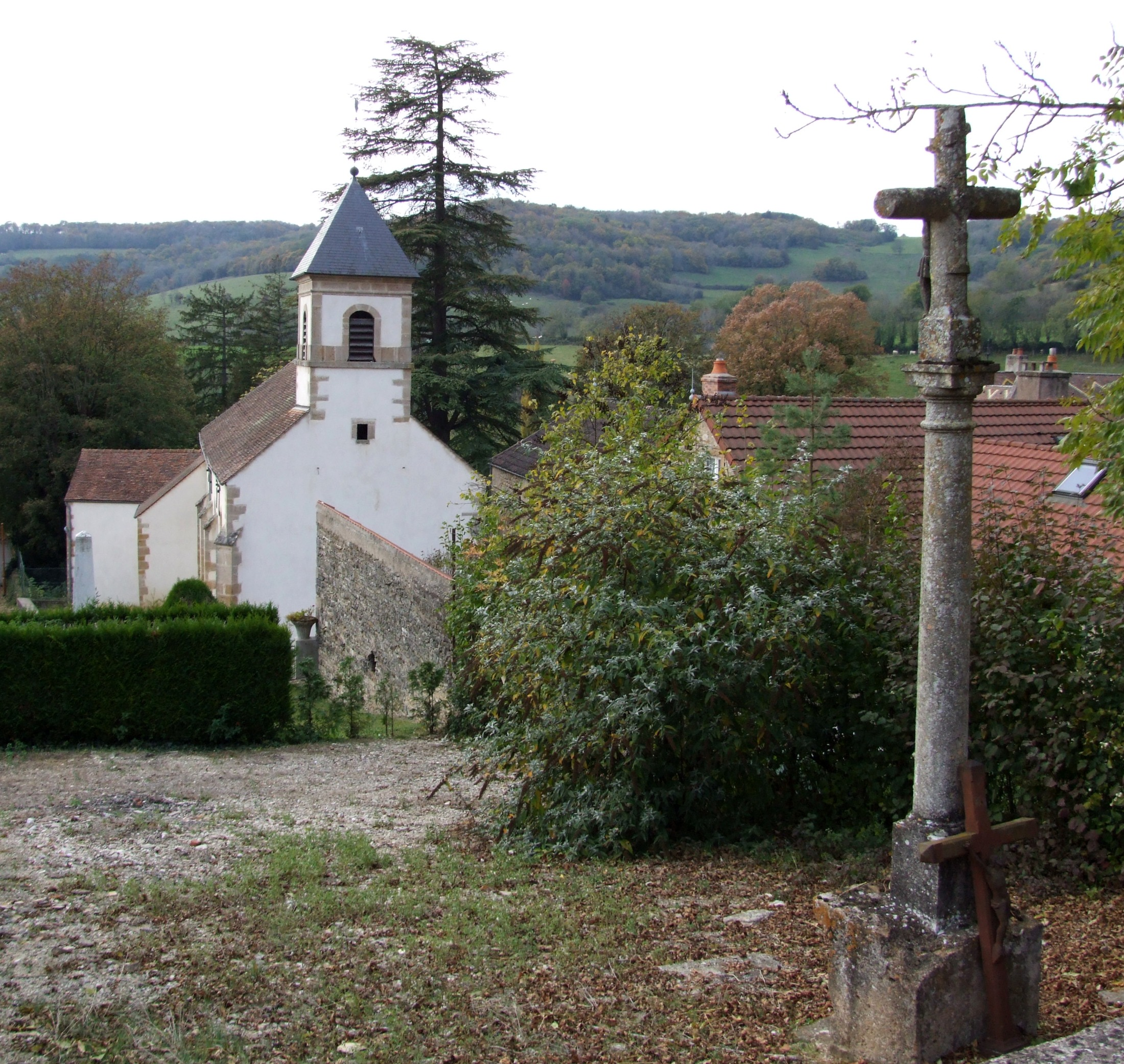
The Parish Church

=== Civil heritage ===
The commune has a number of buildings and sites that are registered as historical monuments:

- A Farmhouse (16th century)
- A House (1807)
- A Farmhouse (18th century)
- A House (19th century)
- A Blacksmith's House (1818)
- A Fountain at Rue Landel (1822)
- Houses and farms (17th-19th century)
- A Fountain at la Dhuys (1822)

=== Religious heritage ===
The commune has several religious buildings and sites that are registered as historical monuments:

- A Benedictine Priory (1502)
- The Parish Church of Saint Martin (15th century)

The Church contains a large number of items that are registered as historical objects. In total, including civil heritage, there are 40 historical objects in the commune.

== See also ==
- Communes of the Côte-d'Or department
