= Verrey =

Verrey may refer to:

- David Verrey, British actor
- Verrey-sous-Drée, French commune
- Verrey-sous-Salmaise, French commune
