= Bussy-la-Pesle =

Bussy-la-Pesle may refer to the following places in France:

- Bussy-la-Pesle, Côte-d'Or, a commune in the department of Côte-d'Or
- Bussy-la-Pesle, Nièvre, a commune in the department of Nièvre
