= Gergueil =

- Commune
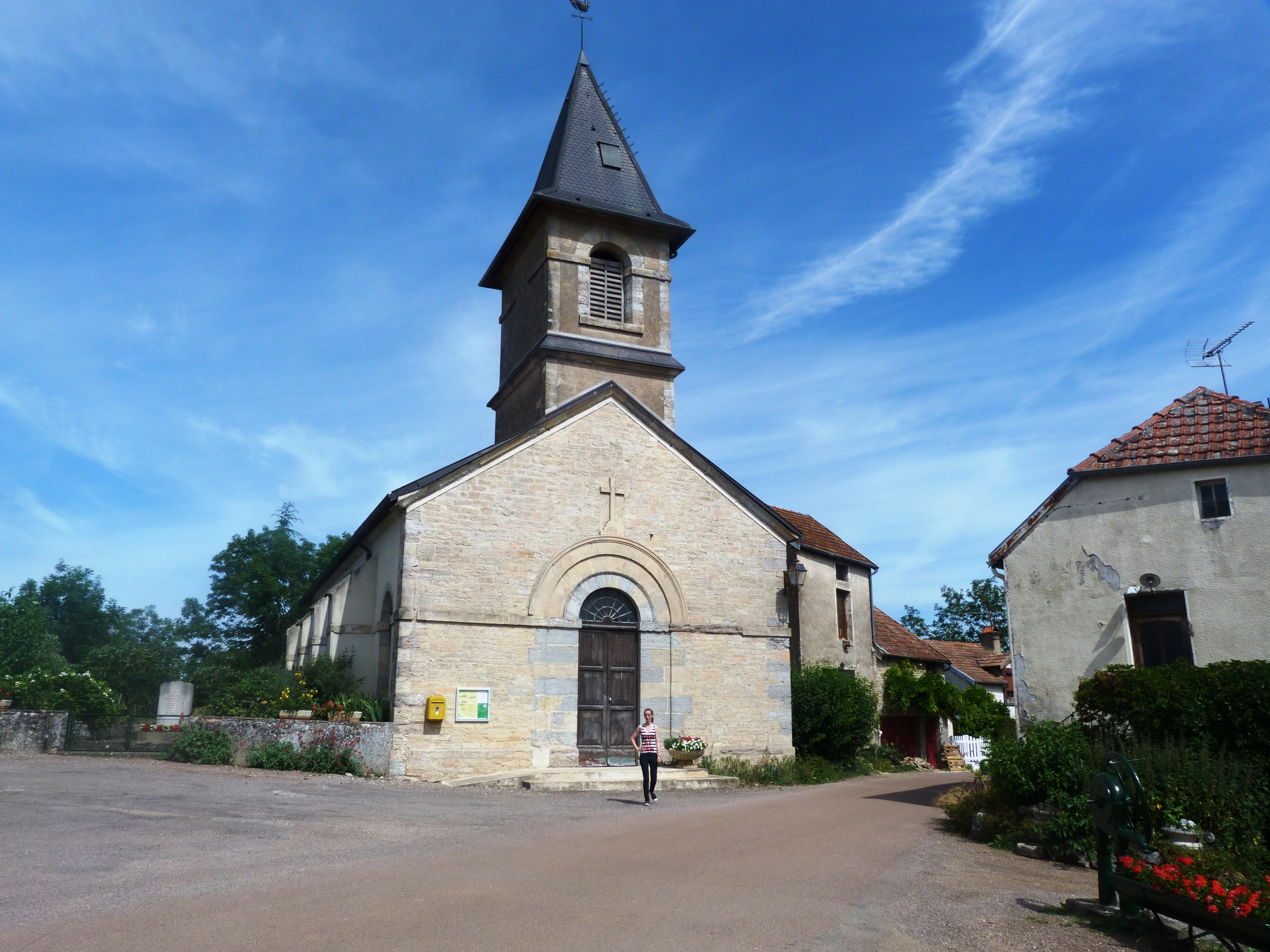
- The church in Gergueil

- Coat of arms
- Location of Gergueil
- Location within France Location within Bourgogne-Franche-Comté
- Coordinates: 47°14′28″N 4°49′09″E
- Country: France
- Region: Bourgogne-Franche-Comté
- Department: Côte-d'Or
- Arrondissement: Dijon
- Canton: Talant

Government
  - Mayor (2020–2026): Bernard Reymond
- Area^{1}: 9.93 km^{2} (3.83 sq mi)
- Elevation: 505 m (1,657 ft)
- Highest elevation: 569 m (1,867 ft)
- Lowest elevation: 340 m (1,120 ft)
- Population (2023): 131
  - Density: 13.2/km^{2} (34.2/sq mi)
- Time zone: UTC+01:00 (CET)
  - Summer (DST): UTC+02:00 (CEST)
- INSEE/Postal code: 21293 /21410
- ^{1} French Land Register data, which excludes lakes, ponds, glaciers > 1 km^{2} (0.386 sq mi or 247 acres) and river estuaries.

Gergueil (French pronunciation: [ʒɛʁɡœj]) is a commune in the Côte-d'Or department in eastern France.

== Population ==
Historical population
Year	Pop.	±% p.a.
1968	81	—
1975	54	−5.63%
1982	66	+2.91%
1990	72	+1.09%
1999	100	+3.72%
2007	136	+3.92%
2012	128	−1.21%
2017	117	−1.78%
2023	131	+1.90%
Source: INSEE

== See also ==
- Communes of the Côte-d'Or department
