= Arcey, Côte-d'Or =

Arcey
- Commune
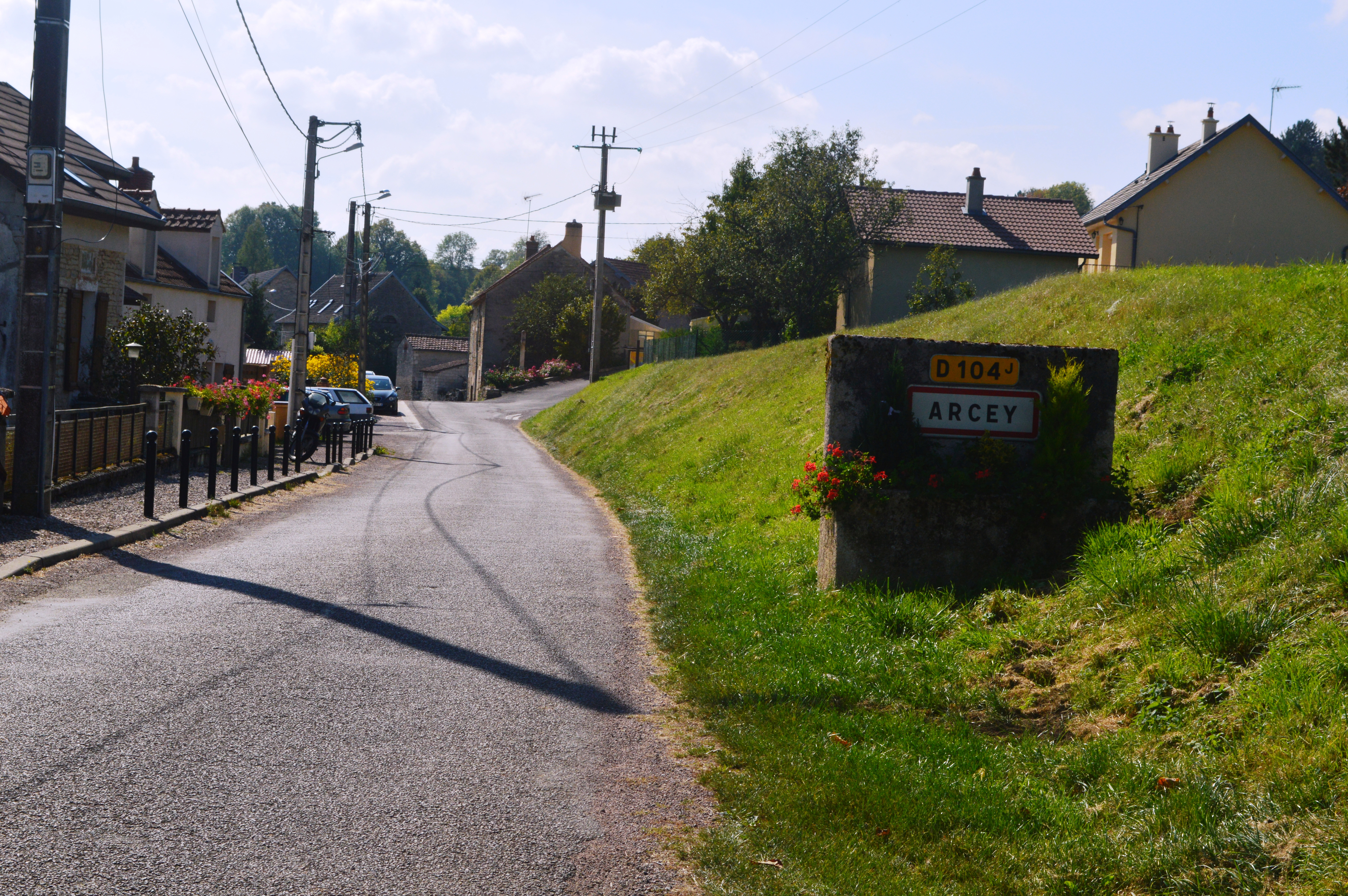
- The road into Arcey

- Coat of arms
- Location of Arcey
- Location within France Location within Bourgogne-Franche-Comté
- Coordinates: 47°16′33″N 4°49′42″E
- Country: France
- Region: Bourgogne-Franche-Comté
- Department: Côte-d'Or
- Arrondissement: Dijon
- Canton: Talant

Government
  - Mayor (2020–2026): Julien Andrzejewski
- Area^{1}: 3.47 km^{2} (1.34 sq mi)
- Elevation: 450 m (1,480 ft)
- Highest elevation: 542 m (1,778 ft)
- Lowest elevation: 290 m (950 ft)
- Population (2023): 51
  - Density: 15/km^{2} (38/sq mi)
- Time zone: UTC+01:00 (CET)
  - Summer (DST): UTC+02:00 (CEST)
- INSEE/Postal code: 21018 /21410
- ^{1} French Land Register data, which excludes lakes, ponds, glaciers > 1 km^{2} (0.386 sq mi or 247 acres) and river estuaries.

Arcey (French pronunciation: [aʁsɛ]) is a commune in the Côte-d'Or department in the Bourgogne-Franche-Comté region of eastern France.

== Geography ==
Arcey is located some 3 km south-east of Sainte-Marie-sur-Ouche and 16 km west by south-west of Dijon. Access to the commune is by the D35 road from Pont-de-Pany in the north-west passing through the north of the commune and continuing south-east to Urcy. The D104 road forms most of the eastern border of the commune as it branches south from the D35 and continues to join the D8 south of the commune. Access to the village is by the country road Rue des Ecrevisses which branches off the D35 in the north and passes south through the length of the commune and the village. The commune is heavily forested with some areas of farmland in the centre near the village.

== History ==
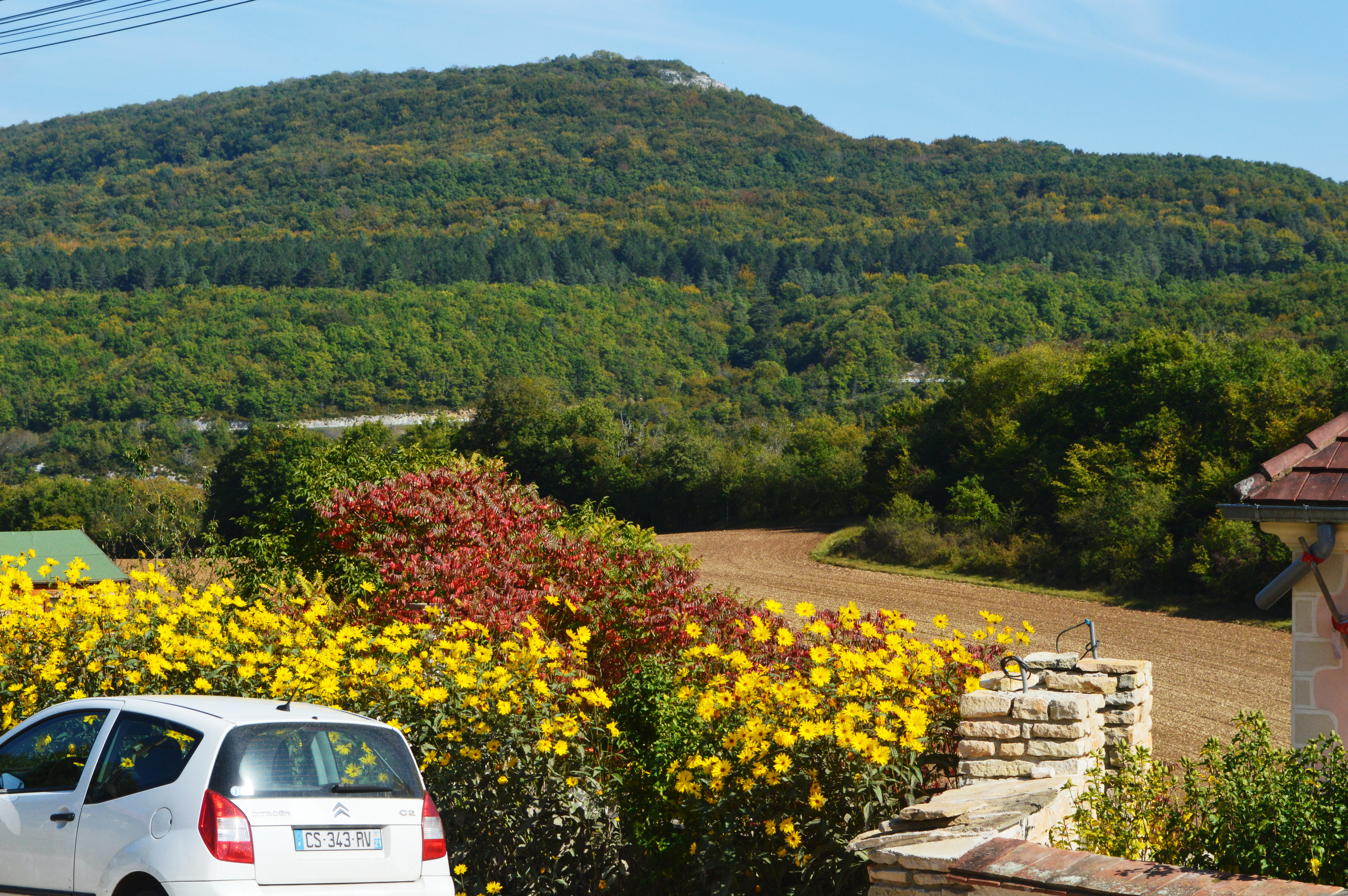
Arcey Landscape

=== Heraldry ===
| Arms of Arcey | Blazon: Party per bend sinister: at 1 Argent, at 2 Gules, debruised over all in chief two tablets of law Azure: that to dexter surmounting the word "L'AMOUR" in letters Sable surmounting two squares of Or; that to sinister surmounting the word "LA LOI" in letters Sable and surmounting a scale in Or, in base a boar Sable in base surmounting the letters "ARCEY" in the arc of a circle the same; |

== Administration ==
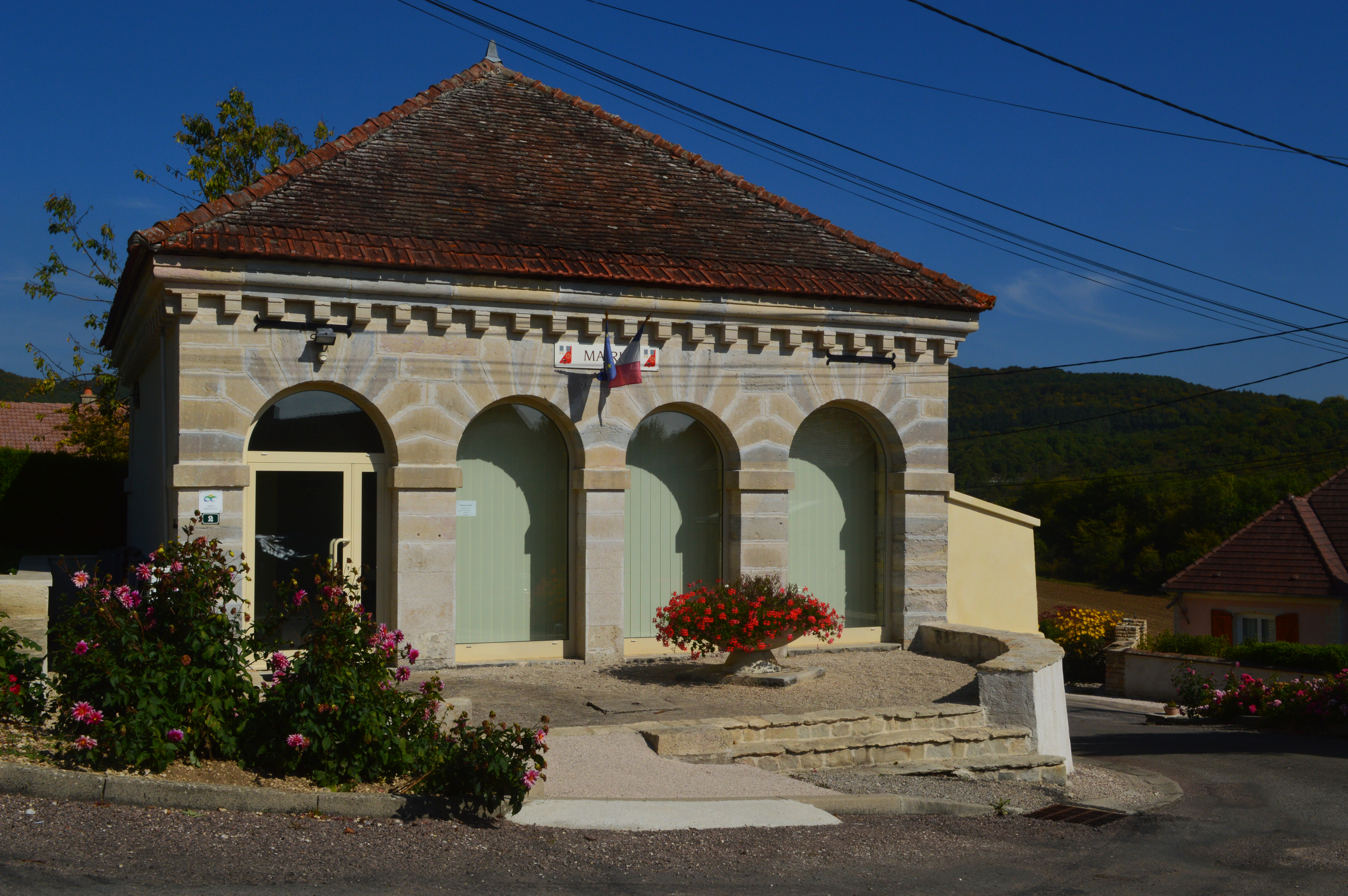
The Town Hall

List of Successive Mayors

| From | To | Name |
|---|---|---|
| 2001 | 2014 | Anne Marie Pugeaut |
| 2014 | 2020 | François Manière |
| 2020 | 2026 | Julien Andrzejewski |

== Demography ==
Historical population

| Year | Pop. | ±% p.a. |
|---|---|---|
| 1793 | 99 | — |
| 1821 | 95 | −0.15% |
| 1846 | 133 | +1.35% |
| 1872 | 90 | −1.49% |
| 1901 | 56 | −1.62% |
| 1926 | 41 | −1.24% |
| 1946 | 27 | −2.07% |
| 1962 | 27 | +0.00% |
| 1968 | 26 | −0.63% |

| Year | Pop. | ±% p.a. |
|---|---|---|
| 1975 | 32 | +3.01% |
| 1982 | 33 | +0.44% |
| 1990 | 42 | +3.06% |
| 1999 | 45 | +0.77% |
| 2007 | 41 | −1.16% |
| 2012 | 49 | +3.63% |
| 2017 | 53 | +1.58% |
| 2023 | 51 | −0.64% |

Source: EHESS and INSEE

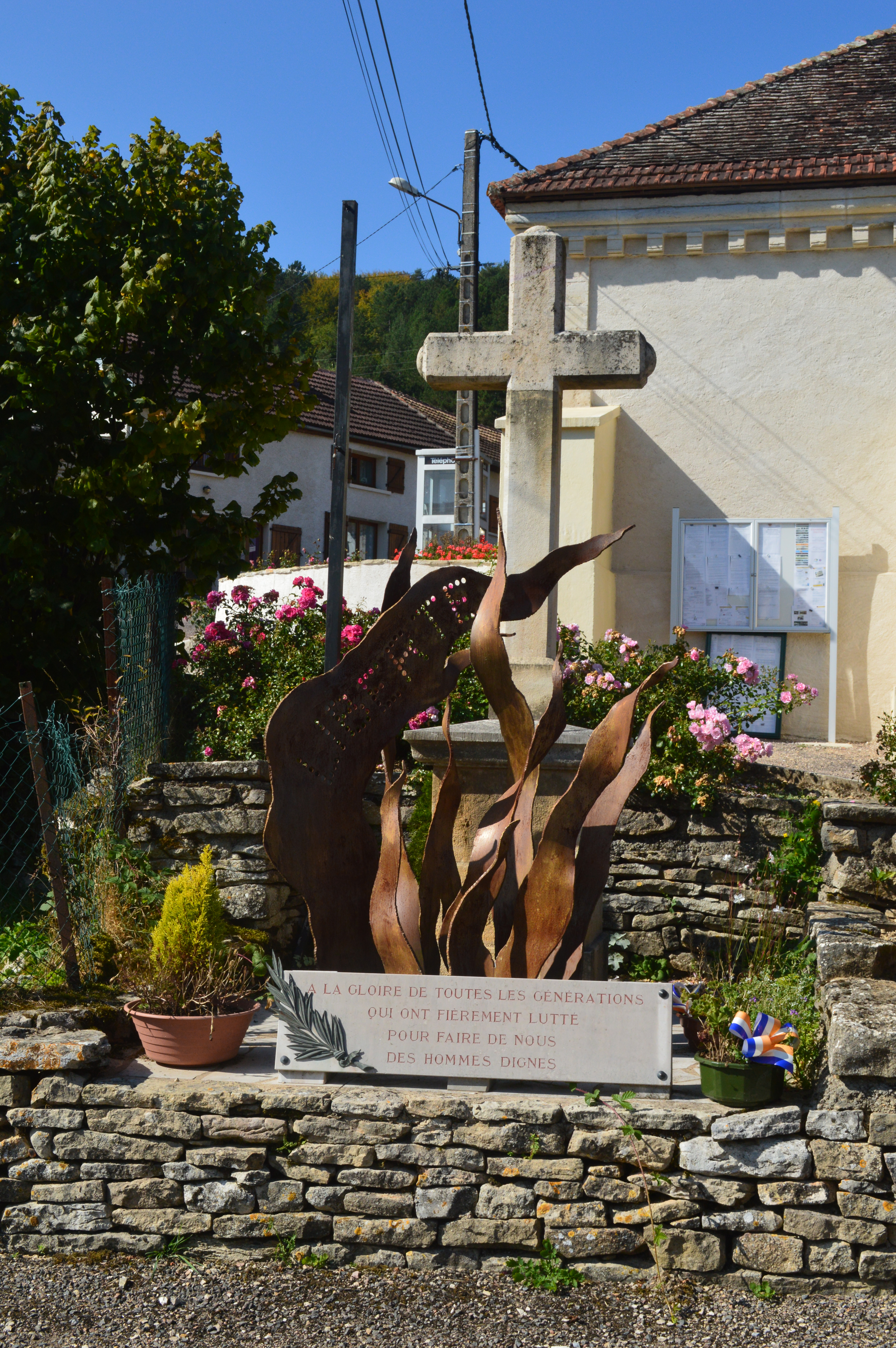
Arcey War Memorial

== Culture and heritage ==
=== Civil heritage ===
The commune has a number of buildings and structures that are registered as historical monuments:

- A Lavoir (Public laundry) (19th century)
- A House at Grande Rue (18th century)
- A series of 5 Milestones of Justice (13th century)
- Houses and Farms (18th-19th century)

=== Religious heritage ===
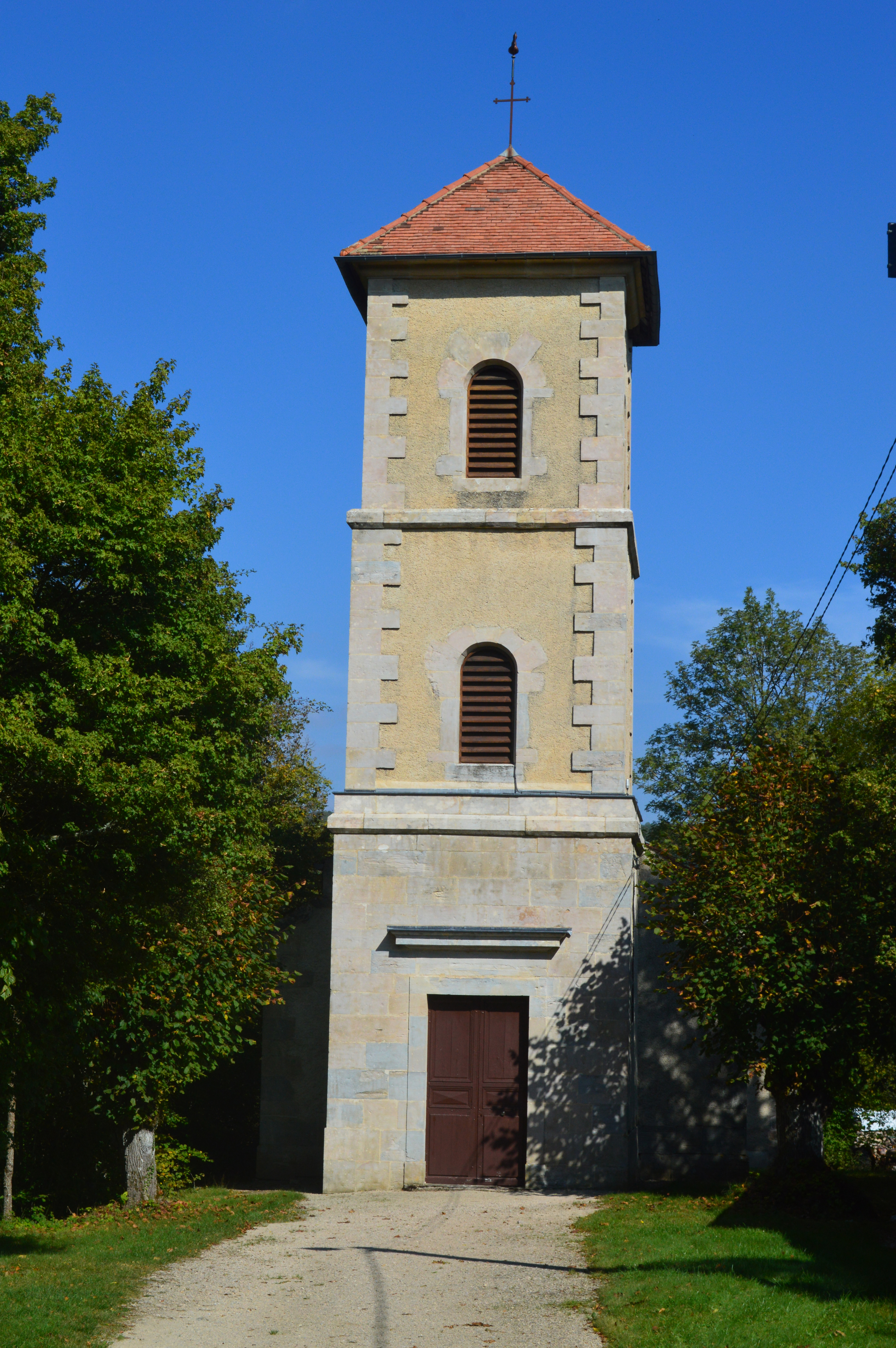
The Church of the Nativity

The commune has one religious building that is registered as an historical monument:

- The Parish Church of the Nativity (15th century) The Church contains many items that are registered as historical objects:
  - 2 Processional Candlesticks (19th century)
  - A Chasuble (18th century)
  - An Exhibition Throne (18th century)
  - The Furniture in the Church
  - A Processional Staff: Virgin and child (18th century)
  - A Painting: Saint Sebastian (19th century)
  - A Baptismal font (16th century)

== See also ==
- Communes of the Côte-d'Or department
