= Grenant-lès-Sombernon =

- Commune
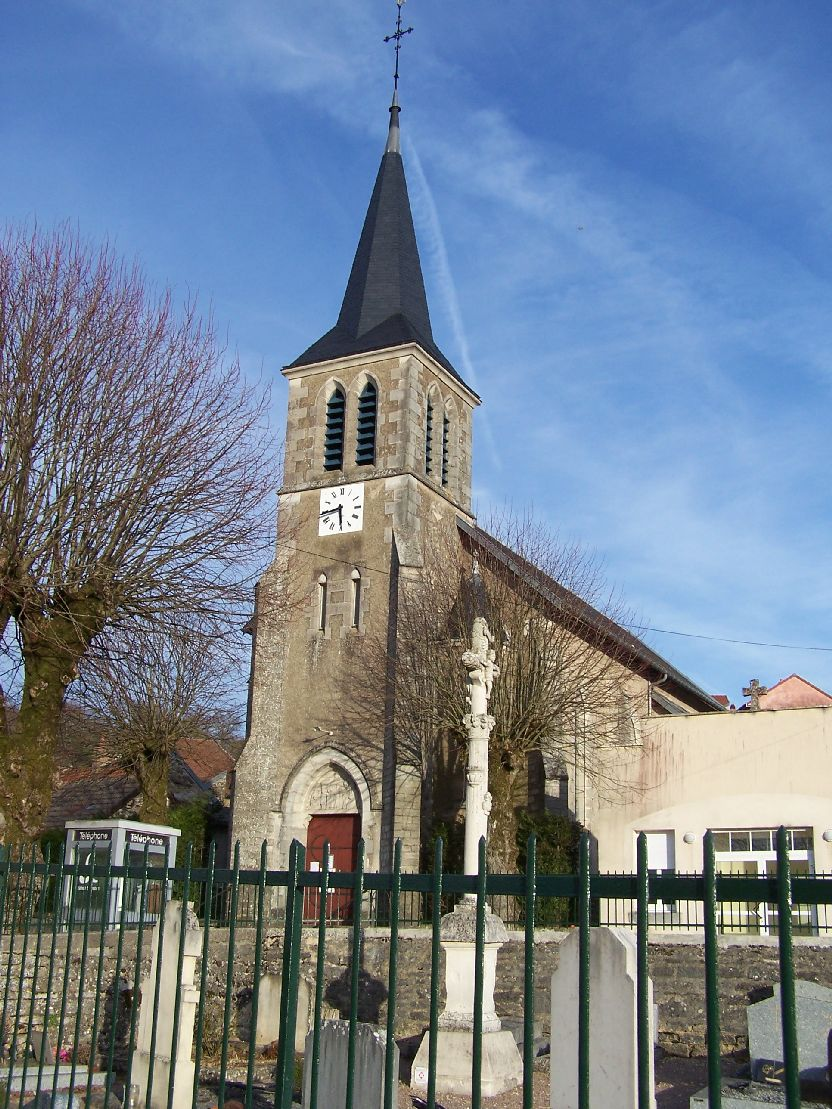
- The church in Grenant-lès-Sombernon

- Coat of arms
- Location of Grenant-lès-Sombernon
- Location within France Location within Bourgogne-Franche-Comté
- Coordinates: 47°16′20″N 4°42′44″E
- Country: France
- Region: Bourgogne-Franche-Comté
- Department: Côte-d'Or
- Arrondissement: Dijon
- Canton: Talant

Government
  - Mayor (2020–2026): Jean-Luc Lecour
- Area^{1}: 7.19 km^{2} (2.78 sq mi)
- Elevation: 570 m (1,870 ft)
- Highest elevation: 580 m (1,900 ft)
- Lowest elevation: 370 m (1,210 ft)
- Population (2023): 216
  - Density: 30.0/km^{2} (77.8/sq mi)
- Time zone: UTC+01:00 (CET)
  - Summer (DST): UTC+02:00 (CEST)
- INSEE/Postal code: 21306 /21540
- ^{1} French Land Register data, which excludes lakes, ponds, glaciers > 1 km^{2} (0.386 sq mi or 247 acres) and river estuaries.

Grenant-lès-Sombernon (French pronunciation: [ɡʁənɑ̃ lɛ sɔ̃bɛʁnɔ̃], literally Grenant near Sombernon) is a commune in the Côte-d'Or department in eastern France.

Prior to September 16, 2005, it was known as Grenand-lès-Sombernon.

== Population ==
Historical population
Year	Pop.	±% p.a.
1968	110	—
1975	87	−3.30%
1982	109	+3.27%
1990	121	+1.31%
1999	138	+1.47%
2007	180	+3.38%
2012	204	+2.53%
2017	212	+0.77%
2023	216	+0.31%
Source: INSEE

== See also ==
- Communes of the Côte-d'Or department
