= Saint-Jean-de-Bœuf =

- Commune
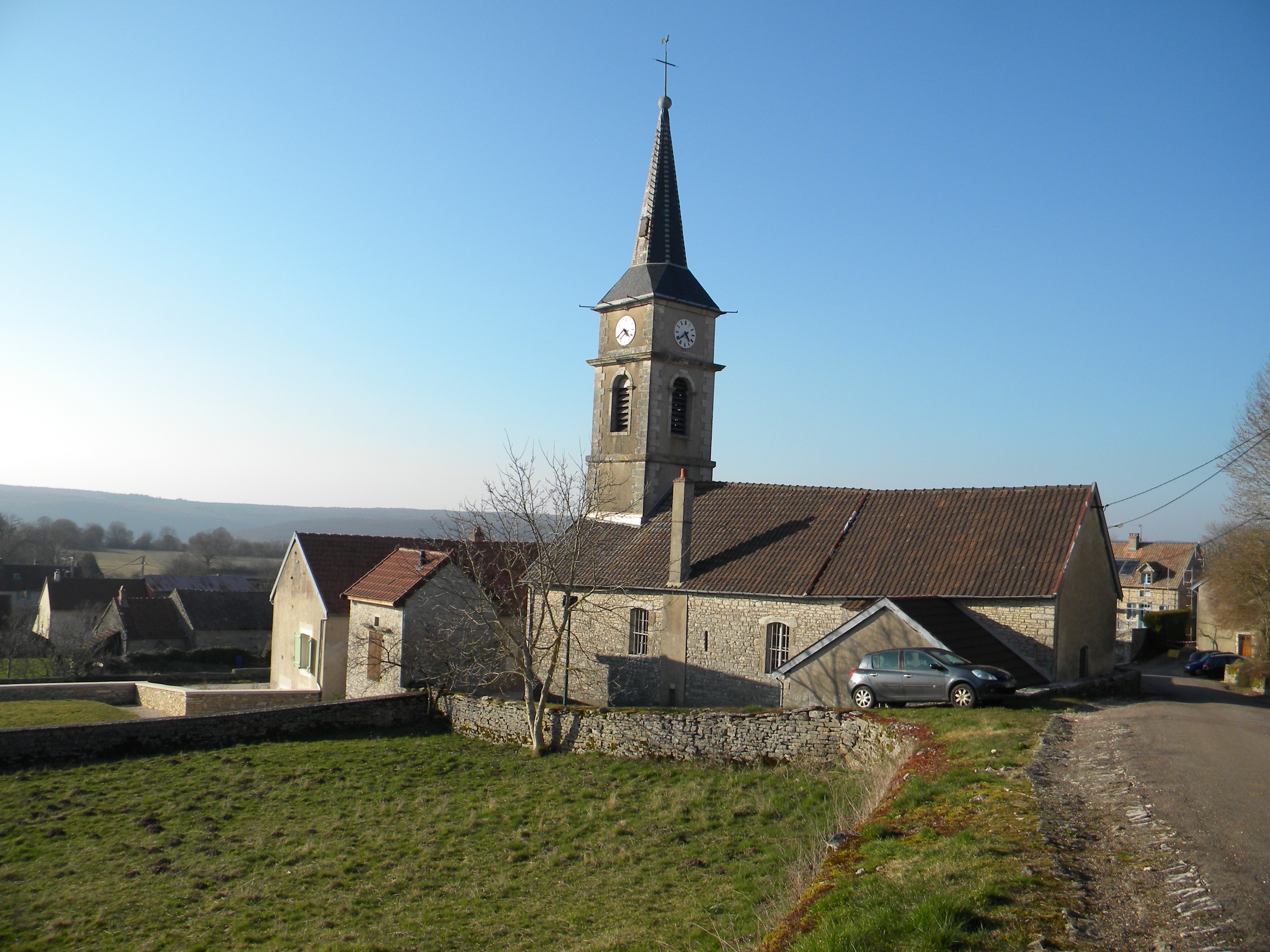
- The church in Saint-Jean-de-Bœuf

- Coat of arms
- Location of Saint-Jean-de-Bœuf
- Location within France Location within Bourgogne-Franche-Comté
- Coordinates: 47°13′06″N 4°44′48″E
- Country: France
- Region: Bourgogne-Franche-Comté
- Department: Côte-d'Or
- Arrondissement: Dijon
- Canton: Talant

Government
  - Mayor (2020–2026): Michel Mercier
- Area^{1}: 12.26 km^{2} (4.73 sq mi)
- Elevation: 518 m (1,699 ft)
- Highest elevation: 619 m (2,031 ft)
- Lowest elevation: 397 m (1,302 ft)
- Population (2023): 102
  - Density: 8.32/km^{2} (21.5/sq mi)
- Time zone: UTC+01:00 (CET)
  - Summer (DST): UTC+02:00 (CEST)
- INSEE/Postal code: 21553 /21410
- ^{1} French Land Register data, which excludes lakes, ponds, glaciers > 1 km^{2} (0.386 sq mi or 247 acres) and river estuaries.

Saint-Jean-de-Bœuf (French pronunciation: [sɛ̃ ʒɑ̃ də bœf]) is a commune in the Côte-d'Or department in eastern France.

== Population ==
Historical population
Year	Pop.	±% p.a.
1968	66	—
1975	51	−3.62%
1982	59	+2.10%
1990	56	−0.65%
1999	65	+1.67%
2007	104	+6.05%
2012	118	+2.56%
2017	112	−1.04%
2023	102	−1.55%
Source: INSEE

== See also ==
- Communes of the Côte-d'Or department
