= Saint-Anthot =

- Commune
- Location of Saint-Anthot
- Location within France Location within Bourgogne-Franche-Comté
- Coordinates: 47°19′00″N 4°38′46″E
- Country: France
- Region: Bourgogne-Franche-Comté
- Department: Côte-d'Or
- Arrondissement: Dijon
- Canton: Talant

Government
  - Mayor (2020–2026): Michel Grossetête
- Area^{1}: 4.11 km^{2} (1.59 sq mi)
- Elevation: 530 m (1,740 ft)
- Highest elevation: 574 m (1,883 ft)
- Lowest elevation: 423 m (1,388 ft)
- Population (2023): 67
  - Density: 16/km^{2} (42/sq mi)
- Time zone: UTC+01:00 (CET)
  - Summer (DST): UTC+02:00 (CEST)
- INSEE/Postal code: 21539 /21540
- ^{1} French Land Register data, which excludes lakes, ponds, glaciers > 1 km^{2} (0.386 sq mi or 247 acres) and river estuaries.

Saint-Anthot (French pronunciation: [sɛ̃.t‿ɑ̃to]) is a commune in the Côte-d'Or department in eastern France.

== Population ==
Historical population
Year	Pop.	±% p.a.
1968	47	—
1975	45	−0.62%
1982	45	+0.00%
1990	45	+0.00%
1999	44	−0.25%
2007	49	+1.35%
2012	68	+6.77%
2017	59	−2.80%
2023	67	+2.14%
Source: INSEE

== See also ==
- Communes of the Côte-d'Or department
