= Vieilmoulin =

- Commune
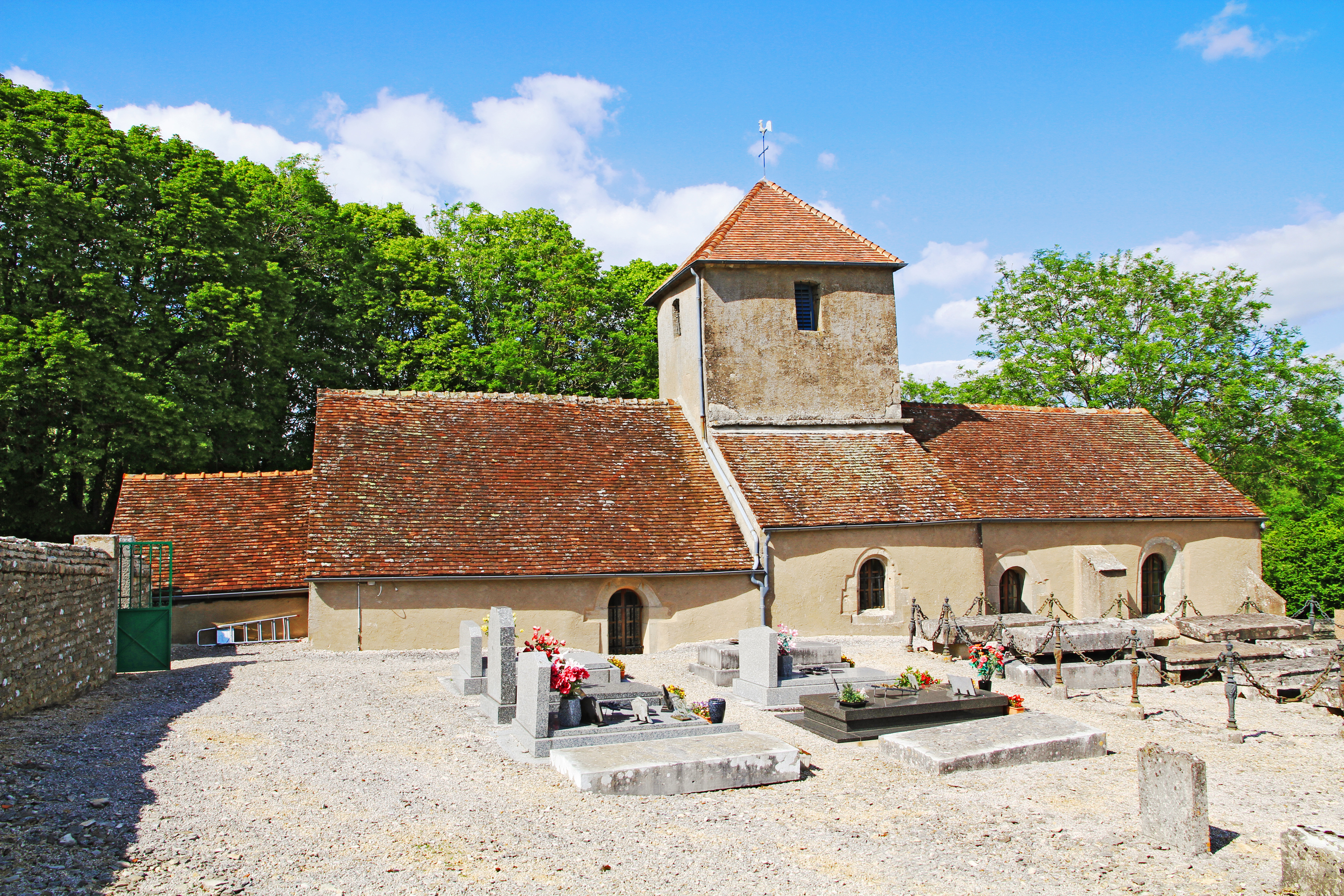
- The church in La Chaleur
- Location of Vieilmoulin
- Location within France Location within Bourgogne-Franche-Comté
- Coordinates: 47°18′45″N 4°40′47″E
- Country: France
- Region: Bourgogne-Franche-Comté
- Department: Côte-d'Or
- Arrondissement: Dijon
- Canton: Talant

Government
  - Mayor (2020–2026): Bernard Levoyet
- Area^{1}: 6.06 km^{2} (2.34 sq mi)
- Elevation: 483 m (1,585 ft)
- Highest elevation: 587 m (1,926 ft)
- Lowest elevation: 428 m (1,404 ft)
- Population (2023): 139
  - Density: 22.9/km^{2} (59.4/sq mi)
- Time zone: UTC+01:00 (CET)
  - Summer (DST): UTC+02:00 (CEST)
- INSEE/Postal code: 21679 /21540
- ^{1} French Land Register data, which excludes lakes, ponds, glaciers > 1 km^{2} (0.386 sq mi or 247 acres) and river estuaries.

Vieilmoulin (French pronunciation: [vjɛjmulɛ̃]) is a commune in the Côte-d'Or department in eastern France.

== Population ==
Historical population
Year	Pop.	±% p.a.
1968	98	—
1975	88	−1.53%
1982	78	−1.71%
1990	69	−1.52%
1999	80	+1.66%
2007	95	+2.17%
2012	108	+2.60%
2017	124	+2.80%
2023	139	+1.92%
Source: INSEE

== See also ==
- Communes of the Côte-d'Or department
