= Verrey-sous-Drée =

- Commune
- Location of Verrey-sous-Drée
- Location within France Location within Bourgogne-Franche-Comté
- Coordinates: 47°22′01″N 4°41′23″E
- Country: France
- Region: Bourgogne-Franche-Comté
- Department: Côte-d'Or
- Arrondissement: Dijon
- Canton: Talant

Government
  - Mayor (2020–2026): Laurent Lamy
- Area^{1}: 3.44 km^{2} (1.33 sq mi)
- Elevation: 506 m (1,660 ft)
- Highest elevation: 548 m (1,798 ft)
- Lowest elevation: 397 m (1,302 ft)
- Population (2023): 99
  - Density: 29/km^{2} (75/sq mi)
- Time zone: UTC+01:00 (CET)
  - Summer (DST): UTC+02:00 (CEST)
- INSEE/Postal code: 21669 /21540
- ^{1} French Land Register data, which excludes lakes, ponds, glaciers > 1 km^{2} (0.386 sq mi or 247 acres) and river estuaries.

Verrey-sous-Drée (French pronunciation: [veʁɛ su dʁe], literally Verrey under Drée) is a commune in the Côte-d'Or department in eastern France.

== Population ==
Historical population
Year	Pop.	±% p.a.
1968	47	—
1975	49	+0.60%
1982	55	+1.66%
1990	66	+2.31%
1999	52	−2.61%
2007	44	−2.07%
2012	67	+8.77%
2017	74	+2.01%
2023	99	+4.97%
Source: INSEE

== See also ==
- Communes of the Côte-d'Or department
