= Talant =

- Commune
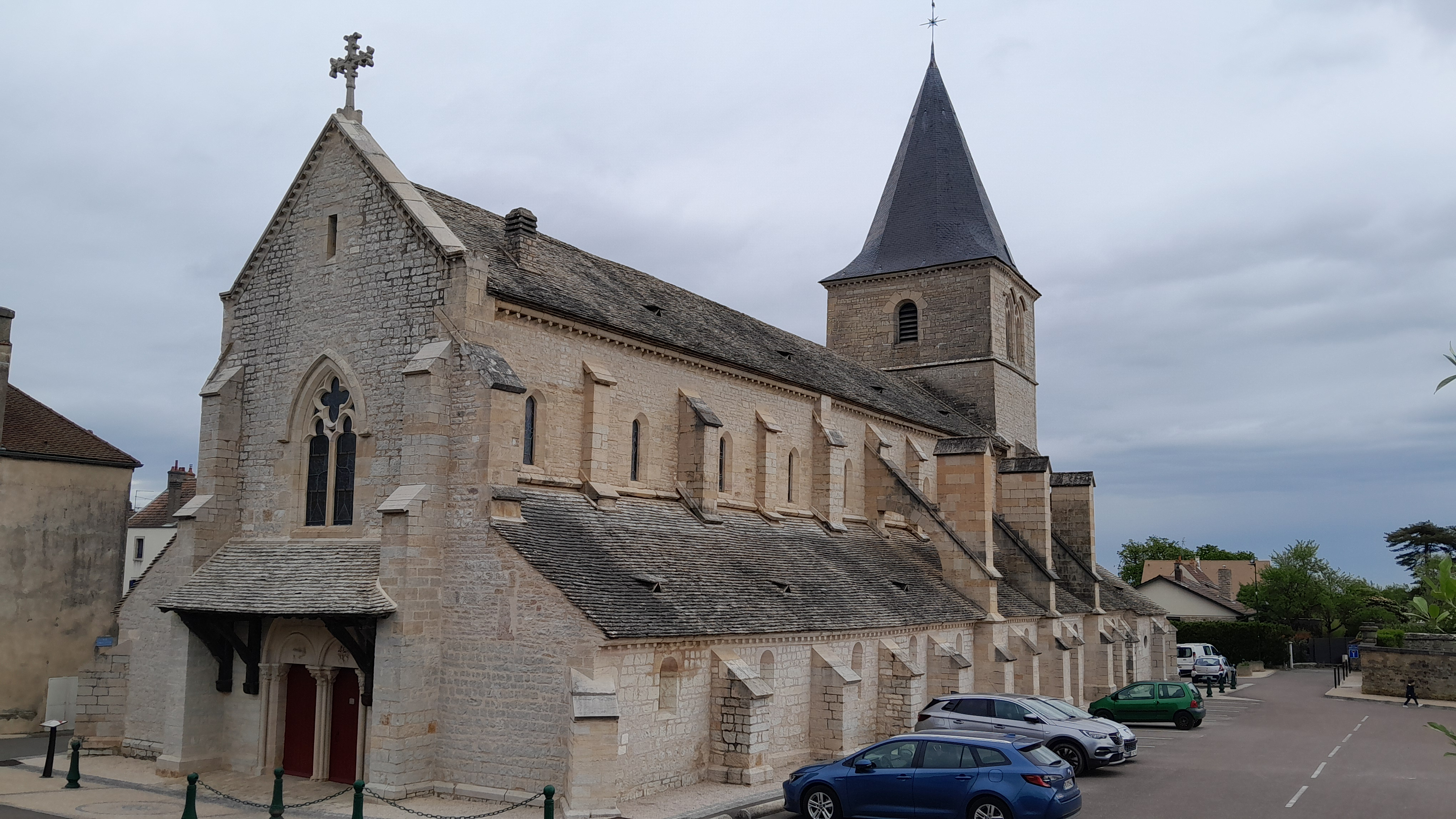
- Notre-Dame de Talant

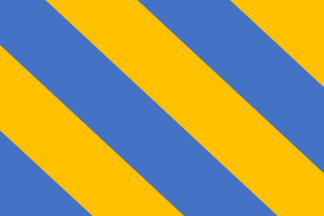
- Flag Coat of arms
- Location of Talant
- Location within France Location within Bourgogne-Franche-Comté
- Coordinates: 47°20′14″N 5°00′23″E
- Country: France
- Region: Bourgogne-Franche-Comté
- Department: Côte-d'Or
- Arrondissement: Dijon
- Canton: Talant
- Intercommunality: Dijon Métropole

Government
  - Mayor (2020–2026): Fabian Ruinet
- Area^{1}: 4.9 km^{2} (1.9 sq mi)
- Elevation: 359 m (1,178 ft)
- Highest elevation: 405 m (1,329 ft)
- Lowest elevation: 243 m (797 ft)
- Population (2023): 11,896
  - Density: 2,400/km^{2} (6,300/sq mi)
- Time zone: UTC+01:00 (CET)
  - Summer (DST): UTC+02:00 (CEST)
- INSEE/Postal code: 21617 /21240
- ^{1} French Land Register data, which excludes lakes, ponds, glaciers > 1 km^{2} (0.386 sq mi or 247 acres) and river estuaries.

Talant (French pronunciation: [talɑ̃]) is a commune in the Côte-d'Or department in eastern France.

== Population ==
Historical population
Year	Pop.	±% p.a.
1968	3,210	—
1975	4,436	+4.73%
1982	11,665	+14.81%
1990	12,860	+1.23%
1999	12,176	−0.61%
2007	11,778	−0.41%
2012	11,204	−0.99%
2017	11,689	+0.85%
2023	11,896	+0.29%
Source: INSEE

== See also ==
- Communes of the Côte-d'Or department
