= Pasques =

- Commune
- Coat of arms
- Location of Pasques
- Location within France Location within Bourgogne-Franche-Comté
- Coordinates: 47°22′02″N 4°51′47″E
- Country: France
- Region: Bourgogne-Franche-Comté
- Department: Côte-d'Or
- Arrondissement: Dijon
- Canton: Talant
- Intercommunality: Ouche et Montagne

Government
  - Mayor (2020–2026): Céline Vialet
- Area^{1}: 20.41 km^{2} (7.88 sq mi)
- Highest elevation: 602 m (1,975 ft)
- Lowest elevation: 372 m (1,220 ft)
- Population (2023): 290
  - Density: 14/km^{2} (37/sq mi)
- Time zone: UTC+01:00 (CET)
  - Summer (DST): UTC+02:00 (CEST)
- INSEE/Postal code: 21478 /21370
- ^{1} French Land Register data, which excludes lakes, ponds, glaciers > 1 km^{2} (0.386 sq mi or 247 acres) and river estuaries.

Pasques (French pronunciation: [pak]) is a commune in the Côte-d'Or department in eastern France.

== Population ==
Historical population
Year	Pop.	±% p.a.
1968	113	—
1975	138	+2.90%
1982	209	+6.11%
1990	285	+3.95%
1999	266	−0.76%
2007	291	+1.13%
2012	300	+0.61%
2017	289	−0.74%
2023	290	+0.06%
Source: INSEE

== See also ==
- Communes of the Côte-d'Or department
