= Savigny-sous-Mâlain =

- Commune
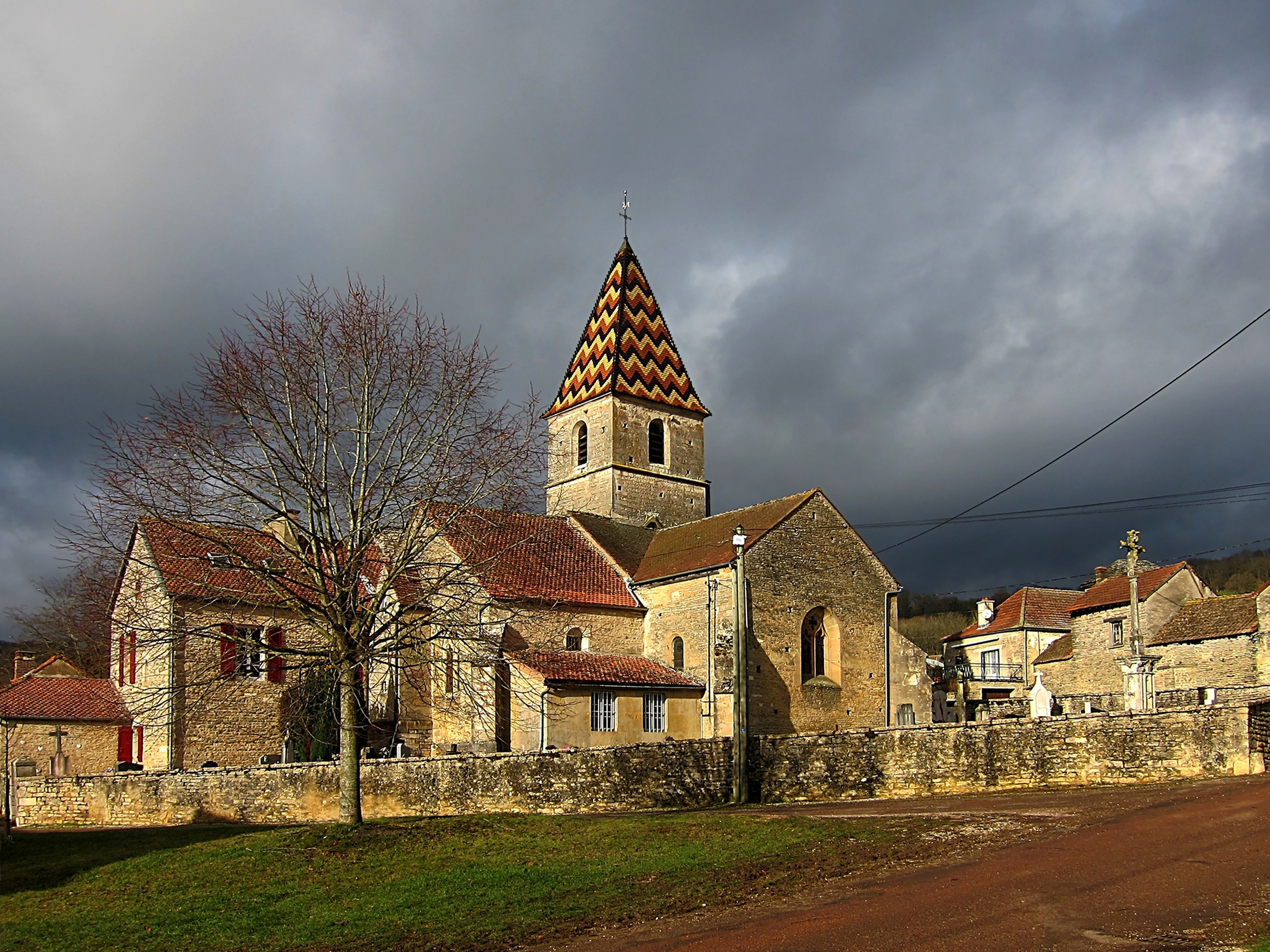
- The church in Savigny-sous-Mâlain

- Coat of arms
- Location of Savigny-sous-Mâlain
- Location within France Location within Bourgogne-Franche-Comté
- Coordinates: 47°19′59″N 4°45′37″E
- Country: France
- Region: Bourgogne-Franche-Comté
- Department: Côte-d'Or
- Arrondissement: Dijon
- Canton: Talant

Government
  - Mayor (2020–2026): Géraldine Meuzard
- Area^{1}: 6.35 km^{2} (2.45 sq mi)
- Highest elevation: 593 m (1,946 ft)
- Lowest elevation: 362 m (1,188 ft)
- Population (2023): 234
  - Density: 36.9/km^{2} (95.4/sq mi)
- Time zone: UTC+01:00 (CET)
  - Summer (DST): UTC+02:00 (CEST)
- INSEE/Postal code: 21592 /21540
- ^{1} French Land Register data, which excludes lakes, ponds, glaciers > 1 km^{2} (0.386 sq mi or 247 acres) and river estuaries.

Savigny-sous-Mâlain (French pronunciation: [saviɲi su malɛ̃], literally Savigny under Mâlain) is a commune in the Côte-d'Or department in eastern France.

== Population ==
Historical population
Year	Pop.	±% p.a.
1968	136	—
1975	136	+0.00%
1982	139	+0.31%
1990	168	+2.40%
1999	202	+2.07%
2007	207	+0.31%
2012	196	−1.09%
2017	223	+2.61%
2023	234	+0.81%
Source: INSEE

== See also ==
- Communes of the Côte-d'Or department
