= Montoillot =

- Commune
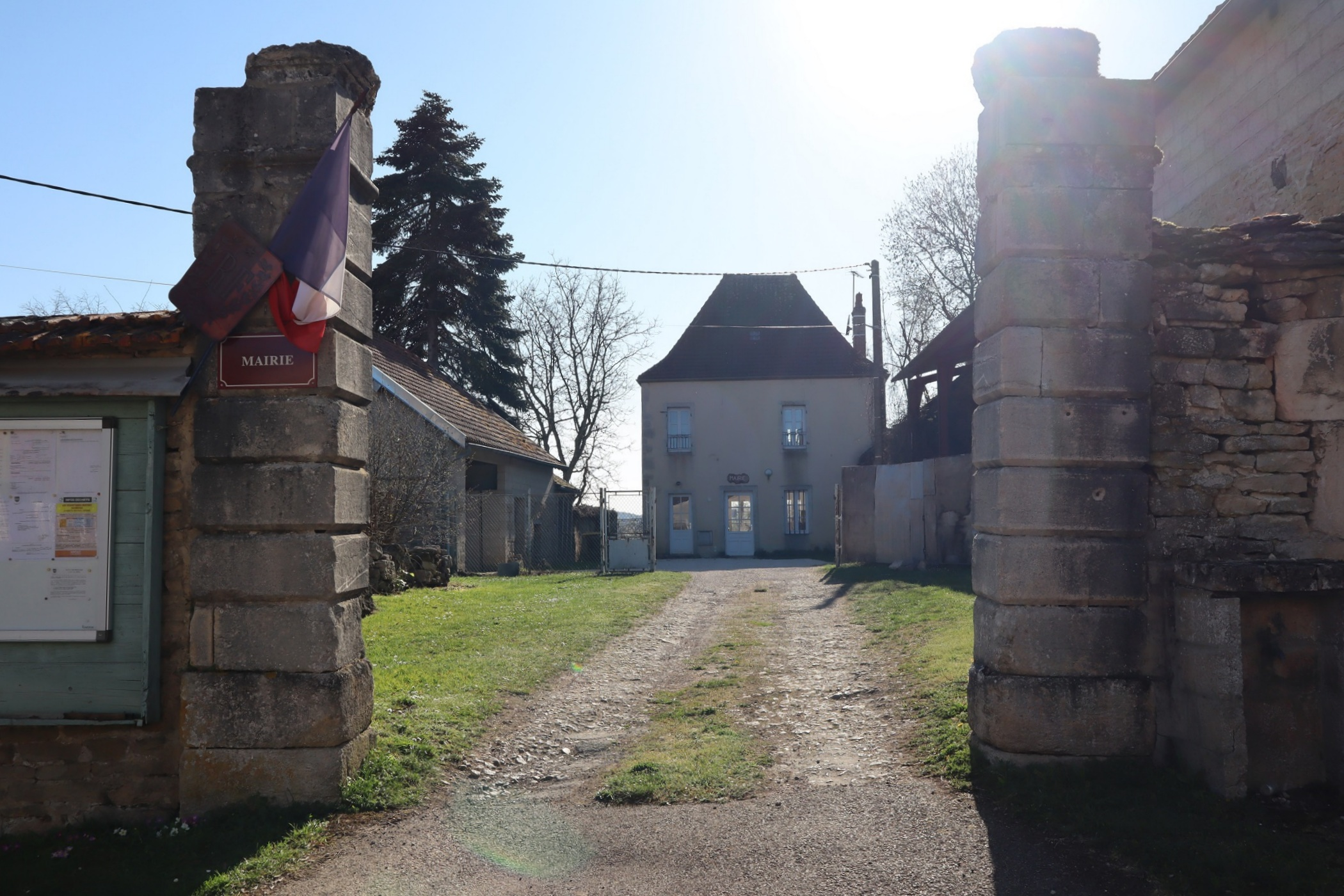
- Town hall

- Coat of arms
- Location of Montoillot
- Location within France Location within Bourgogne-Franche-Comté
- Coordinates: 47°16′14″N 4°39′28″E
- Country: France
- Region: Bourgogne-Franche-Comté
- Department: Côte-d'Or
- Arrondissement: Dijon
- Canton: Talant

Government
  - Mayor (2020–2026): Yann Gobert
- Area^{1}: 7.71 km^{2} (2.98 sq mi)
- Elevation: 400 m (1,300 ft)
- Highest elevation: 552 m (1,811 ft)
- Lowest elevation: 374 m (1,227 ft)
- Population (2023): 96
  - Density: 12/km^{2} (32/sq mi)
- Time zone: UTC+01:00 (CET)
  - Summer (DST): UTC+02:00 (CEST)
- INSEE/Postal code: 21439 /21540
- ^{1} French Land Register data, which excludes lakes, ponds, glaciers > 1 km^{2} (0.386 sq mi or 247 acres) and river estuaries.

Montoillot (French pronunciation: [mɔ̃twajo]) is a commune in the Côte-d'Or department in eastern France.

== Population ==
Historical population
Year	Pop.	±% p.a.
1968	68	—
1975	49	−4.57%
1982	45	−1.21%
1990	59	+3.44%
1999	64	+0.91%
2007	70	+1.13%
2012	73	+0.84%
2017	80	+1.85%
2023	96	+3.09%
Source: INSEE

== See also ==
- Communes of the Côte-d'Or department
