= Remilly-en-Montagne =

- Commune
- Coat of arms
- Location of Remilly-en-Montagne
- Location within France Location within Bourgogne-Franche-Comté
- Coordinates: 47°17′35″N 4°44′16″E
- Country: France
- Region: Bourgogne-Franche-Comté
- Department: Côte-d'Or
- Arrondissement: Dijon
- Canton: Talant
- Intercommunality: Ouche et Montagne

Government
  - Mayor (2020–2026): Marc Chevillon
- Area^{1}: 8.47 km^{2} (3.27 sq mi)
- Elevation: 350 m (1,150 ft)
- Highest elevation: 565 m (1,854 ft)
- Lowest elevation: 330 m (1,080 ft)
- Population (2023): 146
  - Density: 17.2/km^{2} (44.6/sq mi)
- Time zone: UTC+01:00 (CET)
  - Summer (DST): UTC+02:00 (CEST)
- INSEE/Postal code: 21520 /21540
- ^{1} French Land Register data, which excludes lakes, ponds, glaciers > 1 km^{2} (0.386 sq mi or 247 acres) and river estuaries.

Remilly-en-Montagne is a commune in the Côte-d'Or department and Bourgogne-Franche-Comté region of eastern France.

== Population ==
Historical population
Year	Pop.	±% p.a.
1968	104	—
1975	90	−2.04%
1982	70	−3.53%
1990	93	+3.62%
1999	106	+1.46%
2007	129	+2.49%
2012	136	+1.06%
2017	149	+1.84%
2023	146	−0.34%
Source: INSEE

== See also ==
- Communes of the Côte-d'Or department
