= Blaisy-Haut =

- Commune
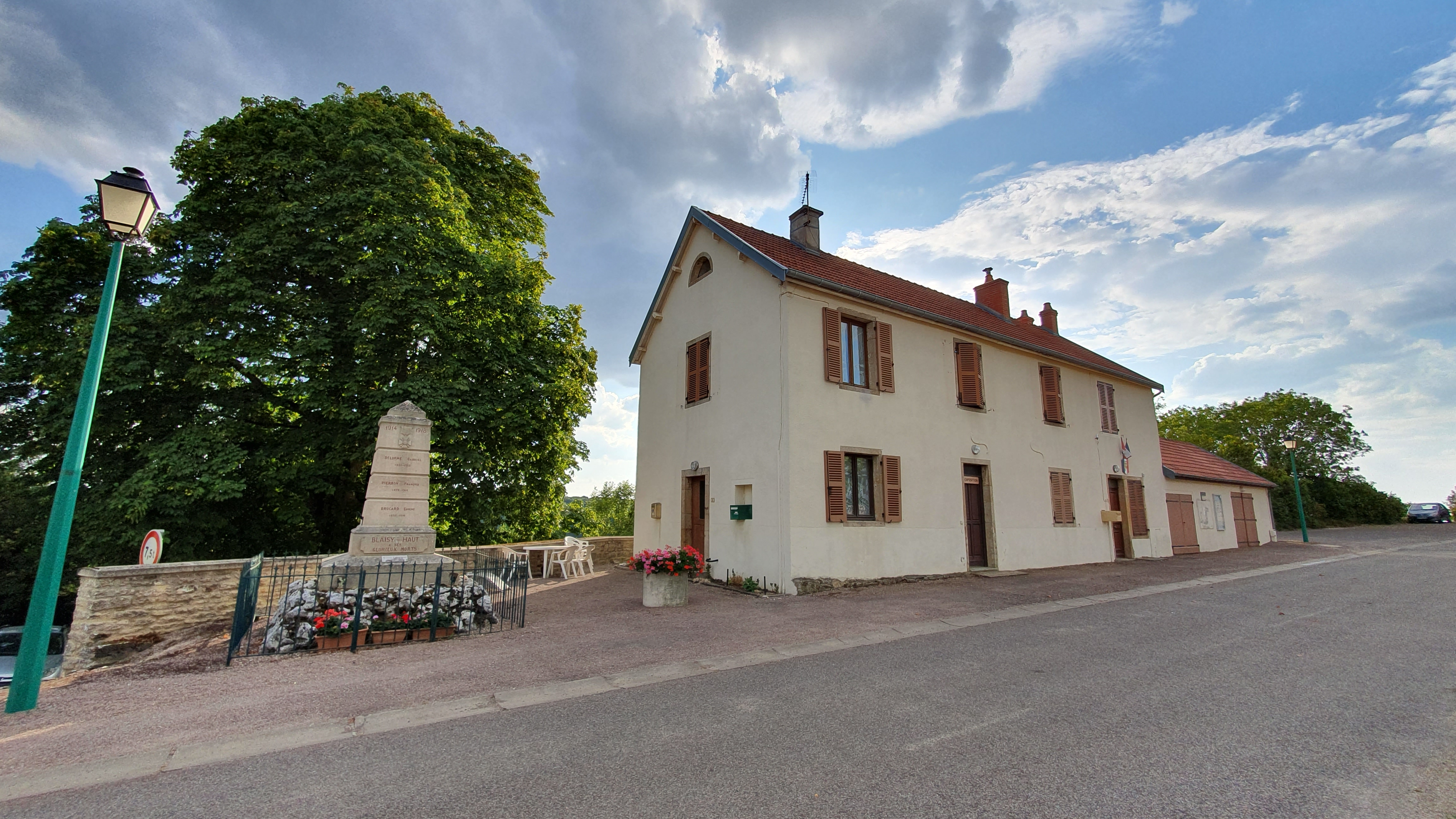
- Town hall
- Location of Blaisy-Haut
- Location within France Location within Bourgogne-Franche-Comté
- Coordinates: 47°21′45″N 4°45′42″E
- Country: France
- Region: Bourgogne-Franche-Comté
- Department: Côte-d'Or
- Arrondissement: Dijon
- Canton: Talant

Government
  - Mayor (2020–2026): Hubert Fèvre
- Area^{1}: 8.31 km^{2} (3.21 sq mi)
- Elevation: 606 m (1,988 ft)
- Highest elevation: 591 m (1,939 ft)
- Lowest elevation: 419 m (1,375 ft)
- Population (2023): 123
  - Density: 14.8/km^{2} (38.3/sq mi)
- Time zone: UTC+01:00 (CET)
  - Summer (DST): UTC+02:00 (CEST)
- INSEE/Postal code: 21081 /21540
- ^{1} French Land Register data, which excludes lakes, ponds, glaciers > 1 km^{2} (0.386 sq mi or 247 acres) and river estuaries.

Blaisy-Haut (French pronunciation: [blɛzi o]) is a commune in the Côte-d'Or department in eastern France.

== Population ==
Historical population
Year	Pop.	±% p.a.
1968	78	—
1975	70	−1.53%
1982	73	+0.60%
1990	101	+4.14%
1999	104	+0.33%
2007	117	+1.48%
2012	123	+1.01%
2017	131	+1.27%
2023	123	−1.04%
Source: INSEE

== See also ==
- Communes of the Côte-d'Or department
