= Saint-Victor-sur-Ouche =

- Commune
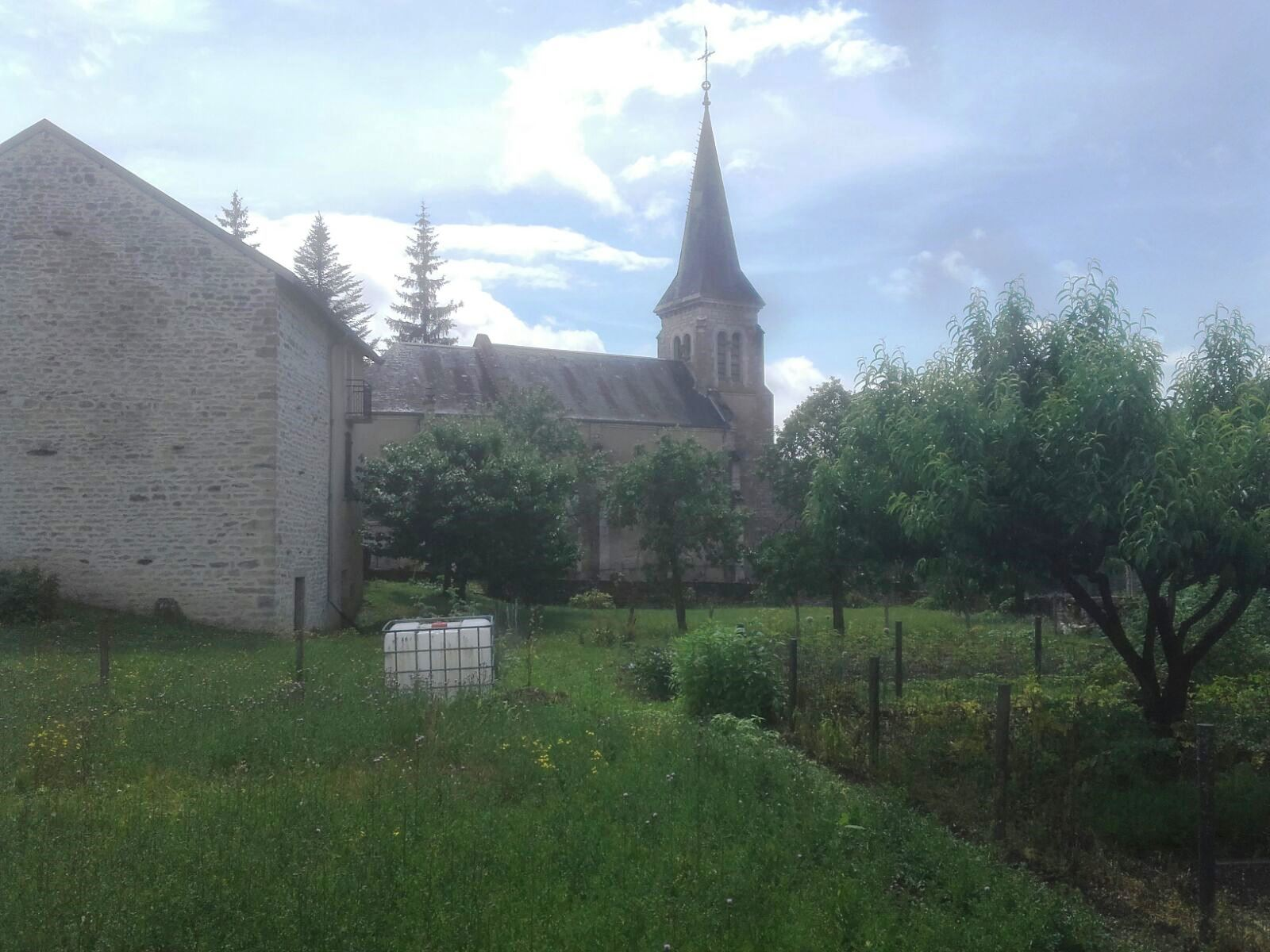
- The church in Saint-Victor-sur-Ouche

- Coat of arms
- Location of Saint-Victor-sur-Ouche
- Location within France Location within Bourgogne-Franche-Comté
- Coordinates: 47°14′05″N 4°44′50″E
- Country: France
- Region: Bourgogne-Franche-Comté
- Department: Côte-d'Or
- Arrondissement: Dijon
- Canton: Talant

Government
  - Mayor (2020–2026): Jean-David Lalevée
- Area^{1}: 12.77 km^{2} (4.93 sq mi)
- Elevation: 306 m (1,004 ft)
- Highest elevation: 559 m (1,834 ft)
- Lowest elevation: 300 m (980 ft)
- Population (2023): 296
  - Density: 23.2/km^{2} (60.0/sq mi)
- Time zone: UTC+01:00 (CET)
  - Summer (DST): UTC+02:00 (CEST)
- INSEE/Postal code: 21578 /21410
- ^{1} French Land Register data, which excludes lakes, ponds, glaciers > 1 km^{2} (0.386 sq mi or 247 acres) and river estuaries.

Saint-Victor-sur-Ouche (French pronunciation: [sɛ̃ viktɔʁ syʁ uʃ], literally Saint-Victor on Ouche) is a commune in the Côte-d'Or department in eastern France.

== Population ==
Historical population
Year	Pop.	±% p.a.
1968	109	—
1975	92	−2.39%
1982	178	+9.89%
1990	222	+2.80%
1999	229	+0.35%
2007	222	−0.39%
2012	263	+3.45%
2017	303	+2.87%
2023	296	−0.39%
Source: INSEE

== See also ==
- Communes of the Côte-d'Or department
