= Échannay =

- Commune
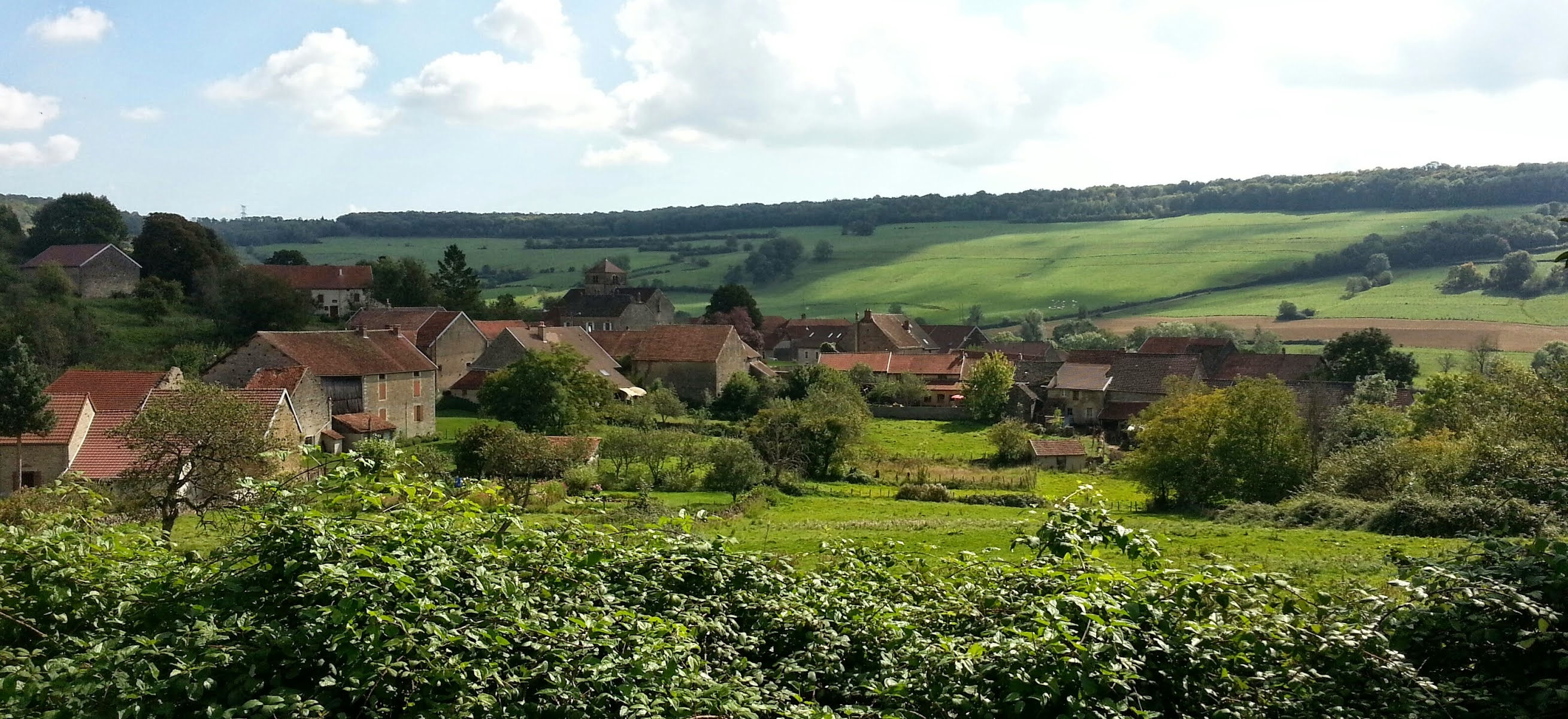
- A general view of Échannay

- Coat of arms
- Location of Échannay
- Location within France Location within Bourgogne-Franche-Comté
- Coordinates: 47°16′57″N 4°40′34″E
- Country: France
- Region: Bourgogne-Franche-Comté
- Department: Côte-d'Or
- Arrondissement: Dijon
- Canton: Talant

Government
  - Mayor (2020–2026): Laurent Streibig
- Area^{1}: 7.18 km^{2} (2.77 sq mi)
- Elevation: 420 m (1,380 ft)
- Highest elevation: 579 m (1,900 ft)
- Lowest elevation: 395 m (1,296 ft)
- Population (2023): 132
  - Density: 18.4/km^{2} (47.6/sq mi)
- Time zone: UTC+01:00 (CET)
  - Summer (DST): UTC+02:00 (CEST)
- INSEE/Postal code: 21238 /21540
- ^{1} French Land Register data, which excludes lakes, ponds, glaciers > 1 km^{2} (0.386 sq mi or 247 acres) and river estuaries.

Échannay (French pronunciation: [eʃanɛ]) is a commune in the Côte-d'Or department in eastern France.

== Population ==
Historical population
Year	Pop.	±% p.a.
1968	73	—
1975	55	−3.96%
1982	86	+6.59%
1990	103	+2.28%
1999	104	+0.11%
2007	120	+1.80%
2012	120	+0.00%
2017	128	+1.30%
2023	132	+0.51%
Source: INSEE

== See also ==
- Communes of the Côte-d'Or department
