= Canton of Talant =

Coordinates: 47.34°N 5.00°E

The canton of Talant is an administrative division of the Côte-d'Or department, eastern France. It was created at the French canton reorganisation which came into effect in March 2015. Its seat is in Talant.

It consists of the following communes:

1. Agey
2. Ancey
3. Arcey
4. Aubigny-lès-Sombernon
5. Barbirey-sur-Ouche
6. Baulme-la-Roche
7. Blaisy-Bas
8. Blaisy-Haut
9. Bussy-la-Pesle
10. Drée
11. Échannay
12. Fleurey-sur-Ouche
13. Gergueil
14. Gissey-sur-Ouche
15. Grenant-lès-Sombernon
16. Grosbois-en-Montagne
17. Lantenay
18. Mâlain
19. Mesmont
20. Montoillot
21. Pasques
22. Plombières-lès-Dijon
23. Prâlon
24. Remilly-en-Montagne
25. Saint-Anthot
26. Sainte-Marie-sur-Ouche
27. Saint-Jean-de-Bœuf
28. Saint-Victor-sur-Ouche
29. Savigny-sous-Mâlain
30. Sombernon
31. Talant
32. Velars-sur-Ouche
33. Verrey-sous-Drée
34. Vieilmoulin
