= Chassagne-Saint-Denis =

- Commune
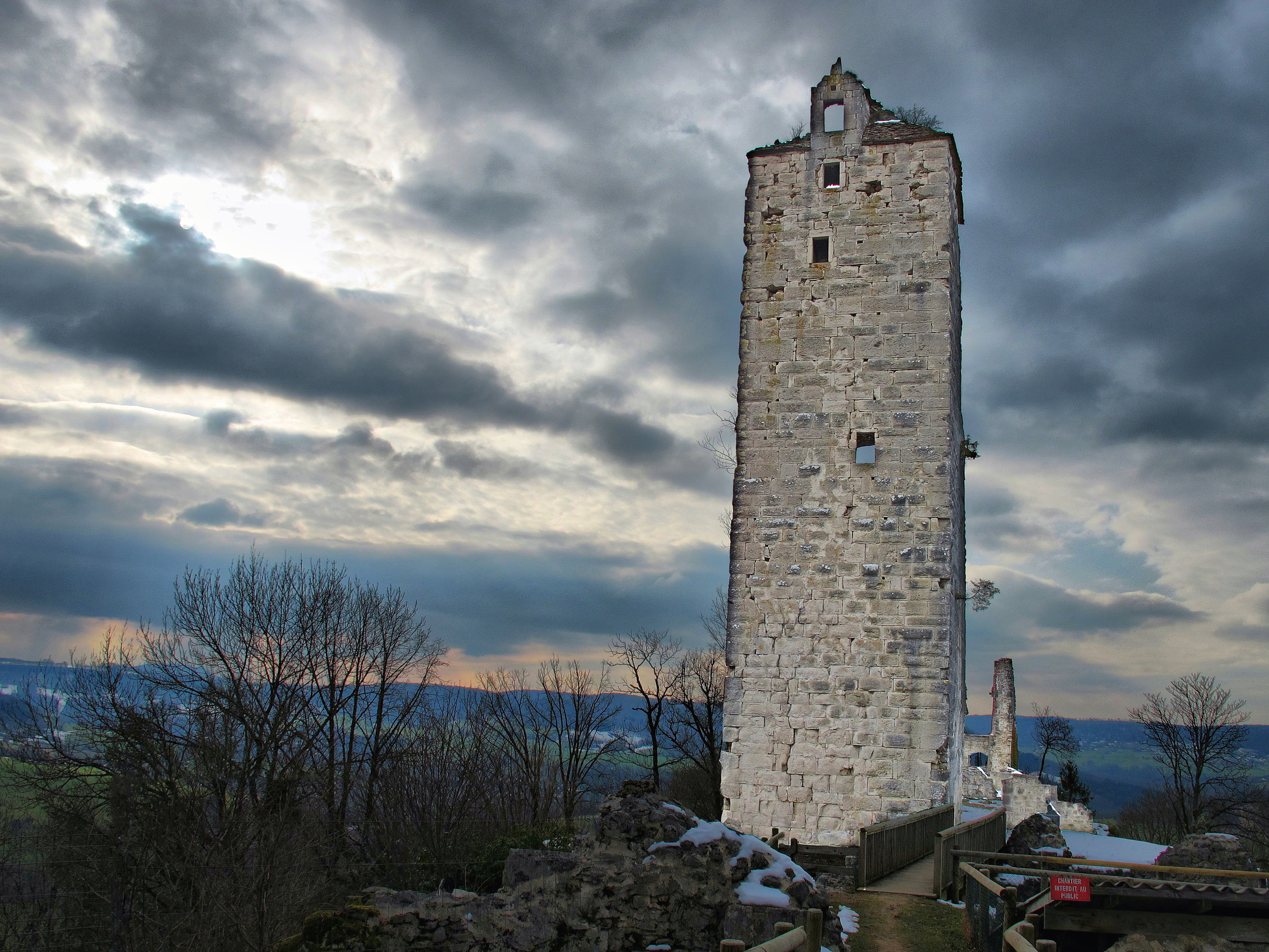
- Chateau of Scey

- Coat of arms
- Location of Chassagne-Saint-Denis
- Location within France Location within Bourgogne-Franche-Comté
- Coordinates: 47°05′03″N 6°06′53″E
- Country: France
- Region: Bourgogne-Franche-Comté
- Department: Doubs
- Arrondissement: Besançon
- Canton: Ornans

Government
  - Mayor (2020–2026): Félix Chopard
- Area^{1}: 9.23 km^{2} (3.56 sq mi)
- Highest elevation: 583 m (1,913 ft)
- Lowest elevation: 420 m (1,380 ft)
- Population (2023): 138
  - Density: 15.0/km^{2} (38.7/sq mi)
- Time zone: UTC+01:00 (CET)
  - Summer (DST): UTC+02:00 (CEST)
- INSEE/Postal code: 25129 /25290
- ^{1} French Land Register data, which excludes lakes, ponds, glaciers > 1 km^{2} (0.386 sq mi or 247 acres) and river estuaries.

Chassagne-Saint-Denis (French pronunciation: [ʃasaɲ sɛ̃ dəni]) is a commune in the Doubs department in the Bourgogne-Franche-Comté region in eastern France.

== Population ==
Historical population
Year	Pop.	±% p.a.
1968	79	—
1975	56	−4.80%
1982	85	+6.14%
1990	100	+2.05%
1999	111	+1.17%
2007	113	+0.22%
2012	117	+0.70%
2017	114	−0.52%
2023	138	+3.24%
Source: INSEE

== See also ==
- Communes of the Doubs department
