= Bussy-la-Pesle, Côte-d'Or =

Bussy-la-Pesle
- Commune
- Location of Bussy-la-Pesle
- Location within France Location within Bourgogne-Franche-Comté
- Coordinates: 47°22′04″N 4°42′24″E
- Country: France
- Region: Bourgogne-Franche-Comté
- Department: Côte-d'Or
- Arrondissement: Dijon
- Canton: Talant

Government
  - Mayor (2020–2026): Jean-Marie Debas
- Area^{1}: 11.47 km^{2} (4.43 sq mi)
- Elevation: 440 m (1,440 ft)
- Highest elevation: 593 m (1,946 ft)
- Lowest elevation: 394 m (1,293 ft)
- Population (2023): 73
  - Density: 6.4/km^{2} (16/sq mi)
- Time zone: UTC+01:00 (CET)
  - Summer (DST): UTC+02:00 (CEST)
- INSEE/Postal code: 21121 /21540
- ^{1} French Land Register data, which excludes lakes, ponds, glaciers > 1 km^{2} (0.386 sq mi or 247 acres) and river estuaries.

Bussy-la-Pesle (French pronunciation: [bysi la pɛl]) is a commune in the Côte-d'Or department in eastern France.

== Population ==
Historical population
Year	Pop.	±% p.a.
1968	94	—
1975	61	−5.99%
1982	78	+3.57%
1990	59	−3.43%
1999	49	−2.04%
2007	55	+1.45%
2012	70	+4.94%
2017	77	+1.92%
2023	73	−0.89%
Source: INSEE

== See also ==
- Communes of the Côte-d'Or department
