= Chassagne, Puy-de-Dôme =

Chassagne
- Commune
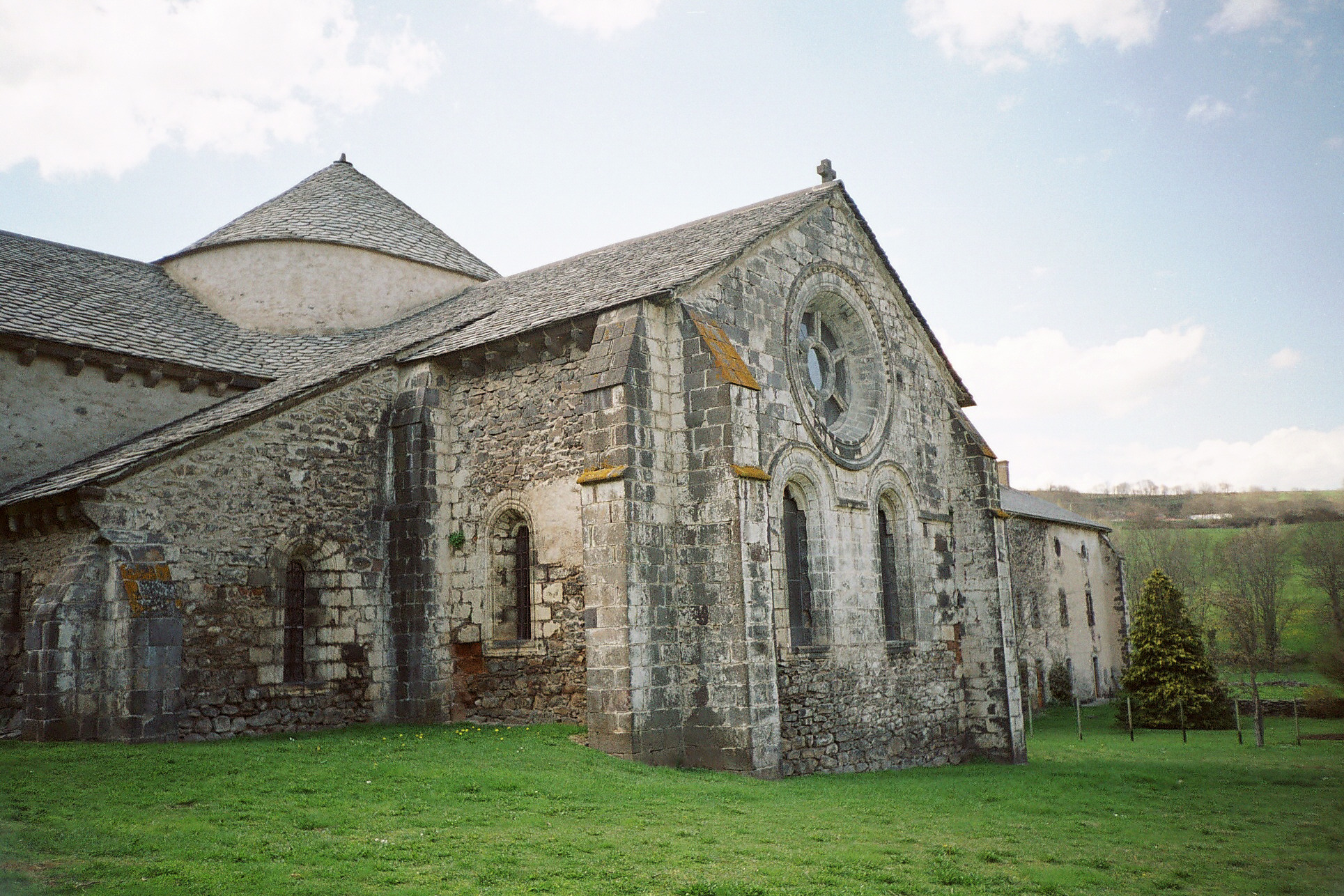
- The abbey of Mègemont in Chassagne

- Coat of arms
- Location of Chassagne
- Location within France Location within Auvergne-Rhône-Alpes
- Coordinates: 45°29′54″N 3°04′38″E
- Country: France
- Region: Auvergne-Rhône-Alpes
- Department: Puy-de-Dôme
- Arrondissement: Issoire
- Canton: Brassac-les-Mines
- Intercommunality: Agglo Pays d'Issoire

Government
  - Mayor (2020–2026): Guy Fradin
- Area^{1}: 16.06 km^{2} (6.20 sq mi)
- Elevation: 950 m (3,120 ft)
- Highest elevation: 1,252 m (4,108 ft)
- Lowest elevation: 622 m (2,041 ft)
- Population (2023): 76
  - Density: 4.7/km^{2} (12/sq mi)
- Time zone: UTC+01:00 (CET)
  - Summer (DST): UTC+02:00 (CEST)
- INSEE/Postal code: 63097 /63320
- ^{1} French Land Register data, which excludes lakes, ponds, glaciers > 1 km^{2} (0.386 sq mi or 247 acres) and river estuaries.

Chassagne (French pronunciation: [ʃasaɲ]; Occitan: Chassanha) is a commune in the Puy-de-Dôme department in Auvergne-Rhône-Alpes in central France. It is in the canton of Brassac-les-Mines.

== See also ==
- Communes of the Puy-de-Dôme department
