= Lantenay, Côte-d'Or =

Lantenay
- Commune
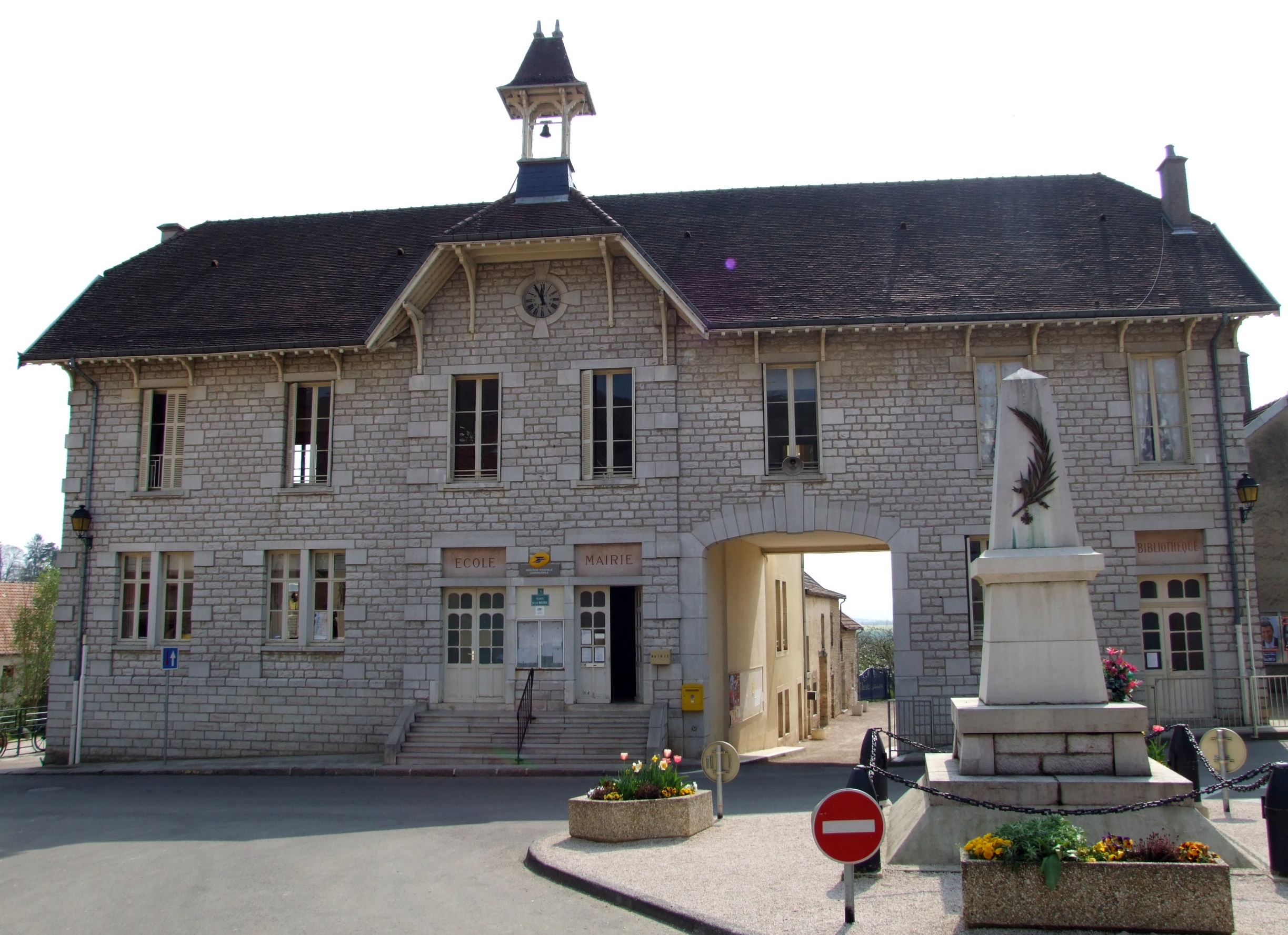
- Town hall

- Coat of arms
- Location of Lantenay
- Location within France Location within Bourgogne-Franche-Comté
- Coordinates: 47°20′34″N 4°52′03″E
- Country: France
- Region: Bourgogne-Franche-Comté
- Department: Côte-d'Or
- Arrondissement: Dijon
- Canton: Talant

Government
  - Mayor (2020–2026): Patrick Seguin
- Area^{1}: 17.13 km^{2} (6.61 sq mi)
- Highest elevation: 581 m (1,906 ft)
- Lowest elevation: 295 m (968 ft)
- Population (2023): 496
  - Density: 29.0/km^{2} (75.0/sq mi)
- Time zone: UTC+01:00 (CET)
  - Summer (DST): UTC+02:00 (CEST)
- INSEE/Postal code: 21339 /21370
- ^{1} French Land Register data, which excludes lakes, ponds, glaciers > 1 km^{2} (0.386 sq mi or 247 acres) and river estuaries.

Lantenay (French pronunciation: [lɑ̃tnɛ]) is a commune in the Côte-d'Or department in eastern France.

== Population ==
Historical population
| Year | Pop. | ±% p.a. |
|---|---|---|
| 1968 | 288 | — |
| 1975 | 266 | −1.13% |
| 1982 | 302 | +1.83% |
| 1990 | 315 | +0.53% |
| 1999 | 425 | +3.38% |
| 2007 | 470 | +1.27% |
| 2012 | 502 | +1.33% |
| 2017 | 510 | +0.32% |
| 2023 | 496 | −0.46% |
Source: INSEE

== See also ==
- Communes of the Côte-d'Or department
