= Raymond Chassagne =

Raymond Chassagne (February 13, 1924 – May 27, 2013) was a Haitian poet and essayist.

== Early life ==
Chassagne was born in Jérémie, Haiti, and was a former officer in the Haitian army who was exiled after a political trial and imprisonment of nine months during President François Duvalier's regime.
