= Drée =

- Commune
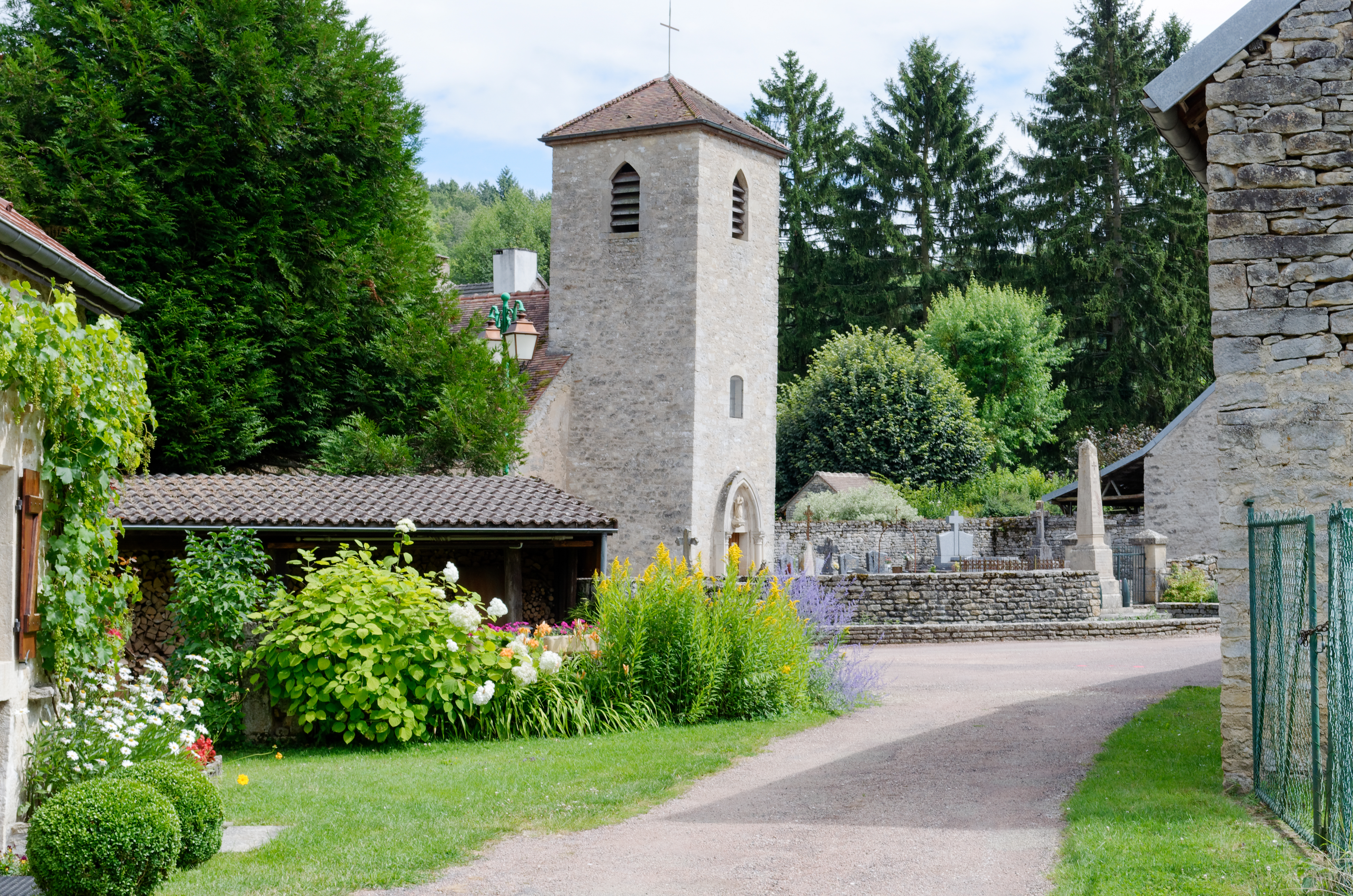
- The church and surroundings in Drée
- Location of Drée
- Location within France Location within Bourgogne-Franche-Comté
- Coordinates: 47°21′00″N 4°41′30″E
- Country: France
- Region: Bourgogne-Franche-Comté
- Department: Côte-d'Or
- Arrondissement: Dijon
- Canton: Talant

Government
  - Mayor (2020–2026): Paul Robinat
- Area^{1}: 5.14 km^{2} (1.98 sq mi)
- Elevation: 460 m (1,510 ft)
- Highest elevation: 573 m (1,880 ft)
- Lowest elevation: 445 m (1,460 ft)
- Population (2023): 66
  - Density: 13/km^{2} (33/sq mi)
- Time zone: UTC+01:00 (CET)
  - Summer (DST): UTC+02:00 (CEST)
- INSEE/Postal code: 21234 /21540
- ^{1} French Land Register data, which excludes lakes, ponds, glaciers > 1 km^{2} (0.386 sq mi or 247 acres) and river estuaries.

Drée (French pronunciation: [dʁe]) is a commune in the Côte-d'Or department in eastern France.

== Population ==
Historical population
Year	Pop.	±% p.a.
1968	23	—
1975	25	+1.20%
1982	41	+7.32%
1990	52	+3.02%
1999	31	−5.59%
2007	53	+6.93%
2012	50	−1.16%
2017	59	+3.37%
2023	66	+1.89%
Source: INSEE

== See also ==
- Communes of the Côte-d'Or department
