= Fleurey-sur-Ouche =

- Commune
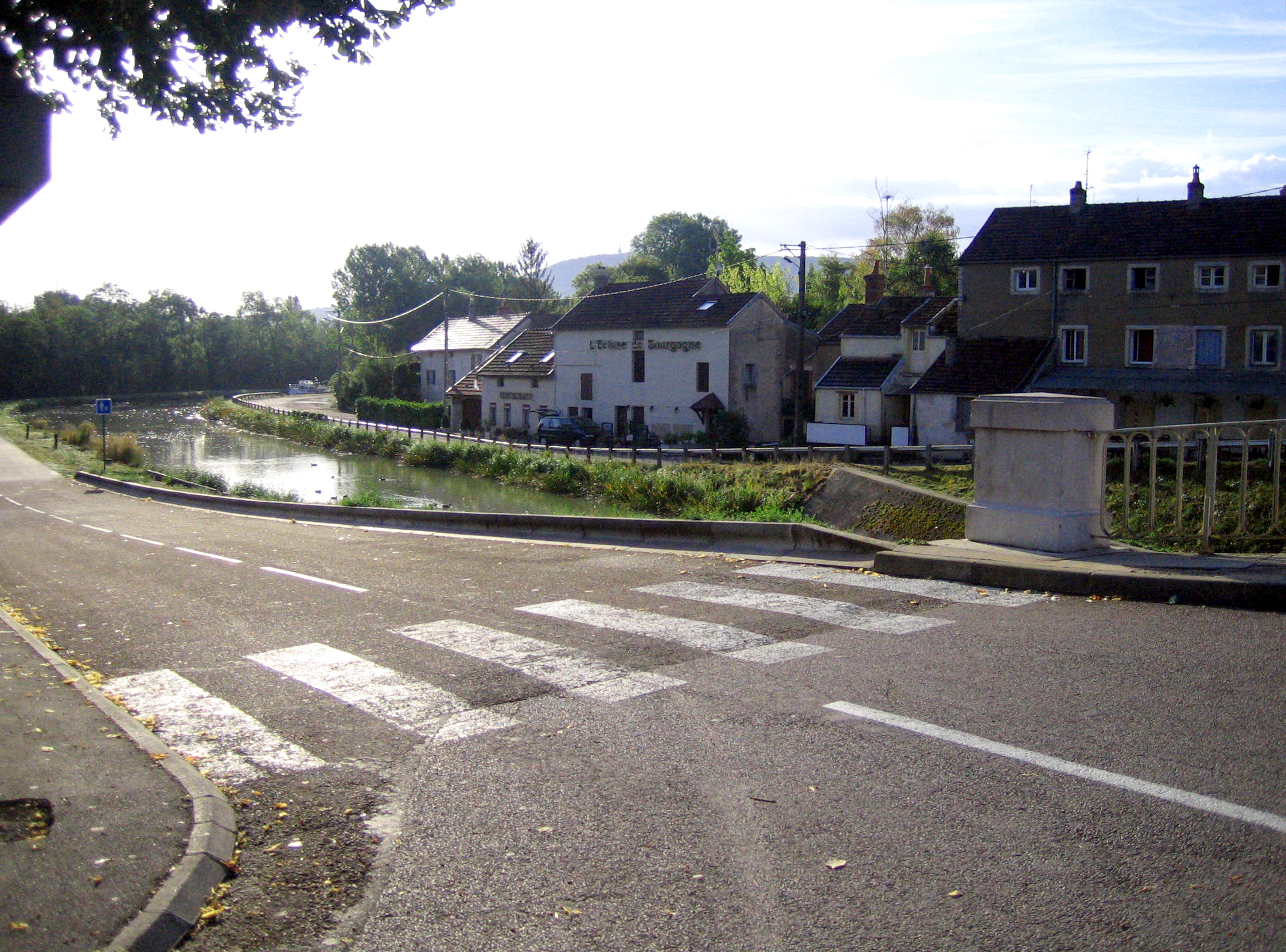
- Canal de Bourgogne

- Coat of arms
- Location of Fleurey-sur-Ouche
- Location within France Location within Bourgogne-Franche-Comté
- Coordinates: 47°18′46″N 4°51′37″E
- Country: France
- Region: Bourgogne-Franche-Comté
- Department: Côte-d'Or
- Arrondissement: Dijon
- Canton: Talant

Government
  - Mayor (2020–2026): Philippe Algrain
- Area^{1}: 29.76 km^{2} (11.49 sq mi)
- Highest elevation: 601 m (1,972 ft)
- Lowest elevation: 260 m (850 ft)
- Population (2023): 1,535
  - Density: 51.58/km^{2} (133.6/sq mi)
- Time zone: UTC+01:00 (CET)
  - Summer (DST): UTC+02:00 (CEST)
- INSEE/Postal code: 21273 /21410
- ^{1} French Land Register data, which excludes lakes, ponds, glaciers > 1 km^{2} (0.386 sq mi or 247 acres) and river estuaries.

Fleurey-sur-Ouche (French pronunciation: [flœʁɛ syʁ uʃ], literally Fleurey on Ouche) is a commune in the Côte-d'Or department in eastern France.

== Population ==
Historical population
Year	Pop.	±% p.a.
1968	593	—
1975	628	+0.82%
1982	879	+4.92%
1990	1,079	+2.60%
1999	1,221	+1.38%
2007	1,183	−0.39%
2012	1,192	+0.15%
2017	1,326	+2.15%
2023	1,535	+2.47%
Source: INSEE

== See also ==
- Communes of the Côte-d'Or department
