= Sainte-Marie-sur-Ouche =

- Commune
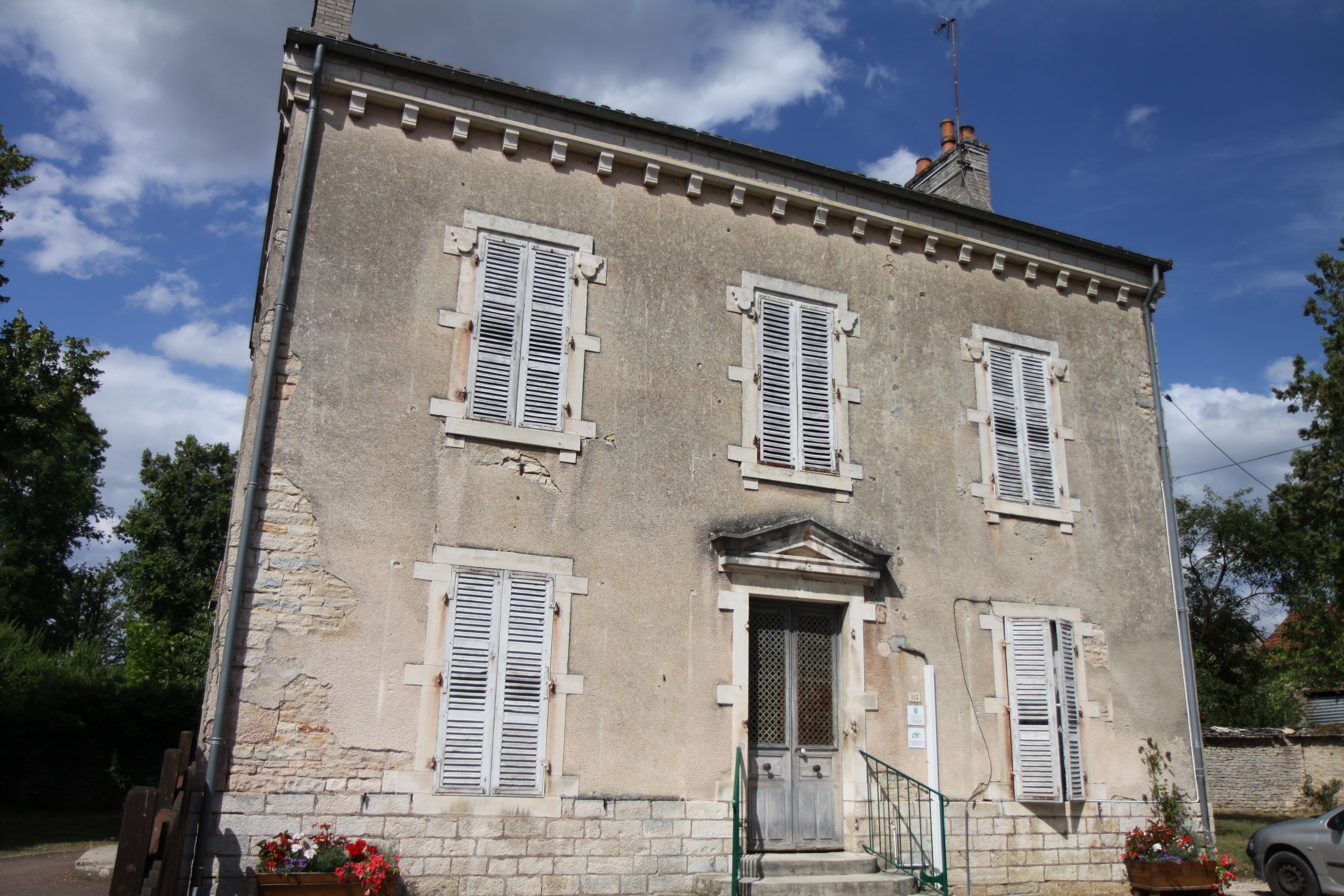
- Town hall

- Coat of arms
- Location of Sainte-Marie-sur-Ouche
- Location within France Location within Bourgogne-Franche-Comté
- Coordinates: 47°17′15″N 4°47′53″E
- Country: France
- Region: Bourgogne-Franche-Comté
- Department: Côte-d'Or
- Arrondissement: Dijon
- Canton: Talant

Government
  - Mayor (2020–2026): André Maillot
- Area^{1}: 8.25 km^{2} (3.19 sq mi)
- Elevation: 288 m (945 ft)
- Highest elevation: 541 m (1,775 ft)
- Lowest elevation: 275 m (902 ft)
- Population (2023): 701
  - Density: 85.0/km^{2} (220/sq mi)
- Time zone: UTC+01:00 (CET)
  - Summer (DST): UTC+02:00 (CEST)
- INSEE/Postal code: 21559 /21410
- ^{1} French Land Register data, which excludes lakes, ponds, glaciers > 1 km^{2} (0.386 sq mi or 247 acres) and river estuaries.

Sainte-Marie-sur-Ouche (French pronunciation: [sɛ̃t maʁi syʁ uʃ]) is a commune in the Côte-d'Or department in eastern France.

== Population ==
Historical population
Year	Pop.	±% p.a.
1968	408	—
1975	388	−0.72%
1982	560	+5.38%
1990	593	+0.72%
1999	589	−0.08%
2007	634	+0.92%
2012	699	+1.97%
2017	693	−0.17%
2023	701	+0.19%
Source: INSEE

== See also ==
- Communes of the Côte-d'Or department
