= Aiserey =

- Commune
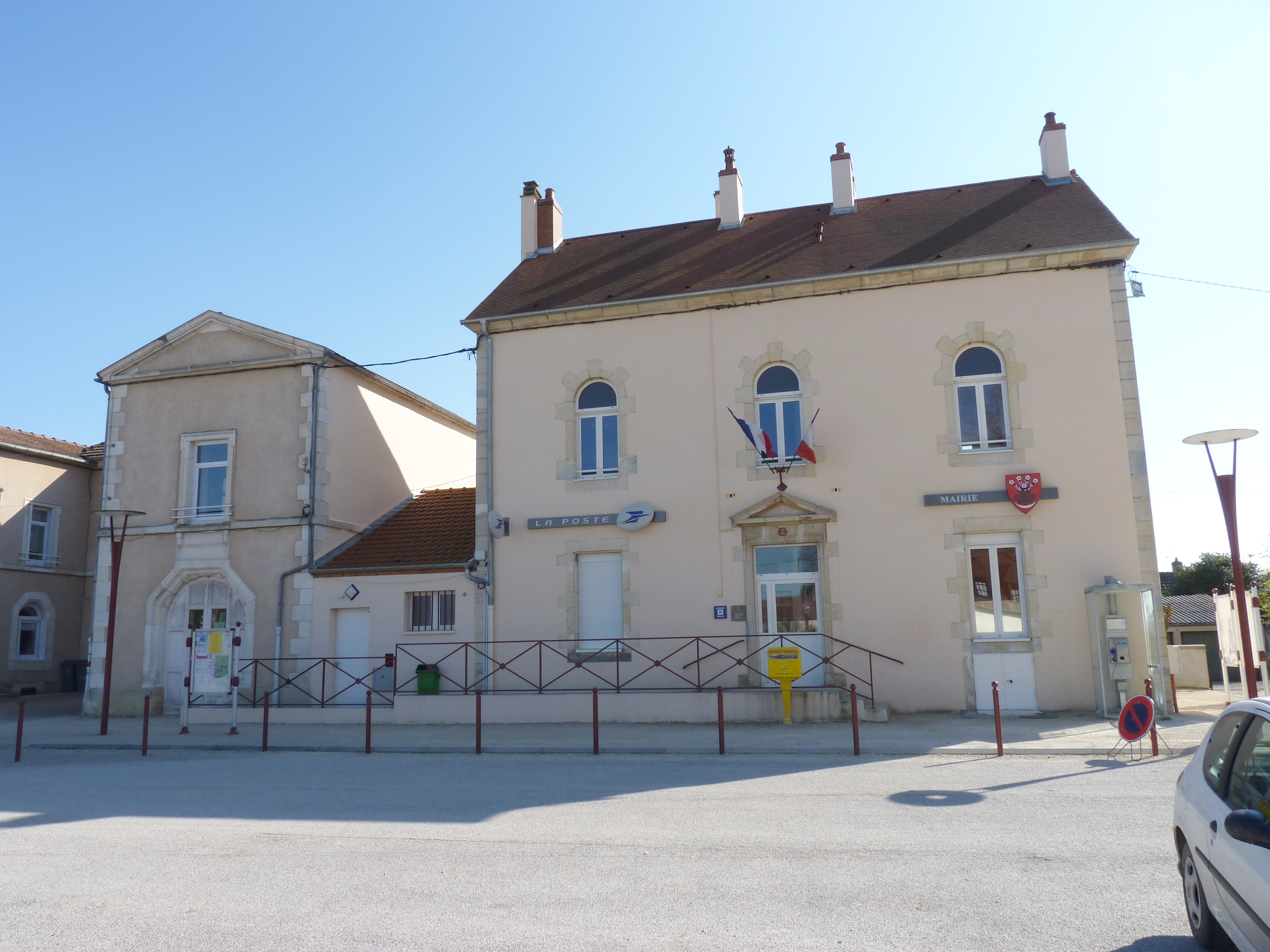
- The Town Hall and the Post Office

- Coat of arms
- Location of Aiserey
- Location within France Location within Bourgogne-Franche-Comté
- Coordinates: 47°10′23″N 5°09′46″E
- Country: France
- Region: Bourgogne-Franche-Comté
- Department: Côte-d'Or
- Arrondissement: Dijon
- Canton: Genlis
- Intercommunality: Plaine Dijonnaise

Government
  - Mayor (2020–2026): Dominique Janin
- Area^{1}: 10.5 km^{2} (4.1 sq mi)
- Highest elevation: 199 m (653 ft)
- Lowest elevation: 187 m (614 ft)
- Population (2023): 1,500
  - Density: 140/km^{2} (370/sq mi)
- Time zone: UTC+01:00 (CET)
  - Summer (DST): UTC+02:00 (CEST)
- INSEE/Postal code: 21005 /21110
- ^{1} French Land Register data, which excludes lakes, ponds, glaciers > 1 km^{2} (0.386 sq mi or 247 acres) and river estuaries.

Aiserey (French pronunciation: [ɛzʁɛ]) is a commune in the Côte-d'Or department in the Bourgogne-Franche-Comté region of eastern France.

== Geography ==
Aiserey is located some 20 km south-east of Dijon and 32 km north-east of Beaune. It can be accessed by Highway D968 from Dijon and Longecourt-en-Plaine in the north-west continuing through the heart of the commune and the village on to Brazey-en-Plaine in the south-east. There is also the D116 coming from Izeure in the west continuing to Echigey in the east. The railway line running south-east from Dijon passes through the commune and there is a station next to the village. In addition to the village there is the small village of Potangey in the north. The rest of the commune is entirely farmland apart from the former sugar refinery in the east.

The Canal de Bourgogne passes through the commune on the eastern side from north-west to south-east. The Oucherolle stream rises near the village and flows to the north-west. There are reservoirs in the east of the commune linked to the canal.

=== Heraldry ===
Arms of Aiserey	Blazon: Gules, a vase of Or supported by a crescent of argent and garnished by a bouquet of 5 flowers stalked and leaved the same, the flowers seeded in Or.

== Administration ==
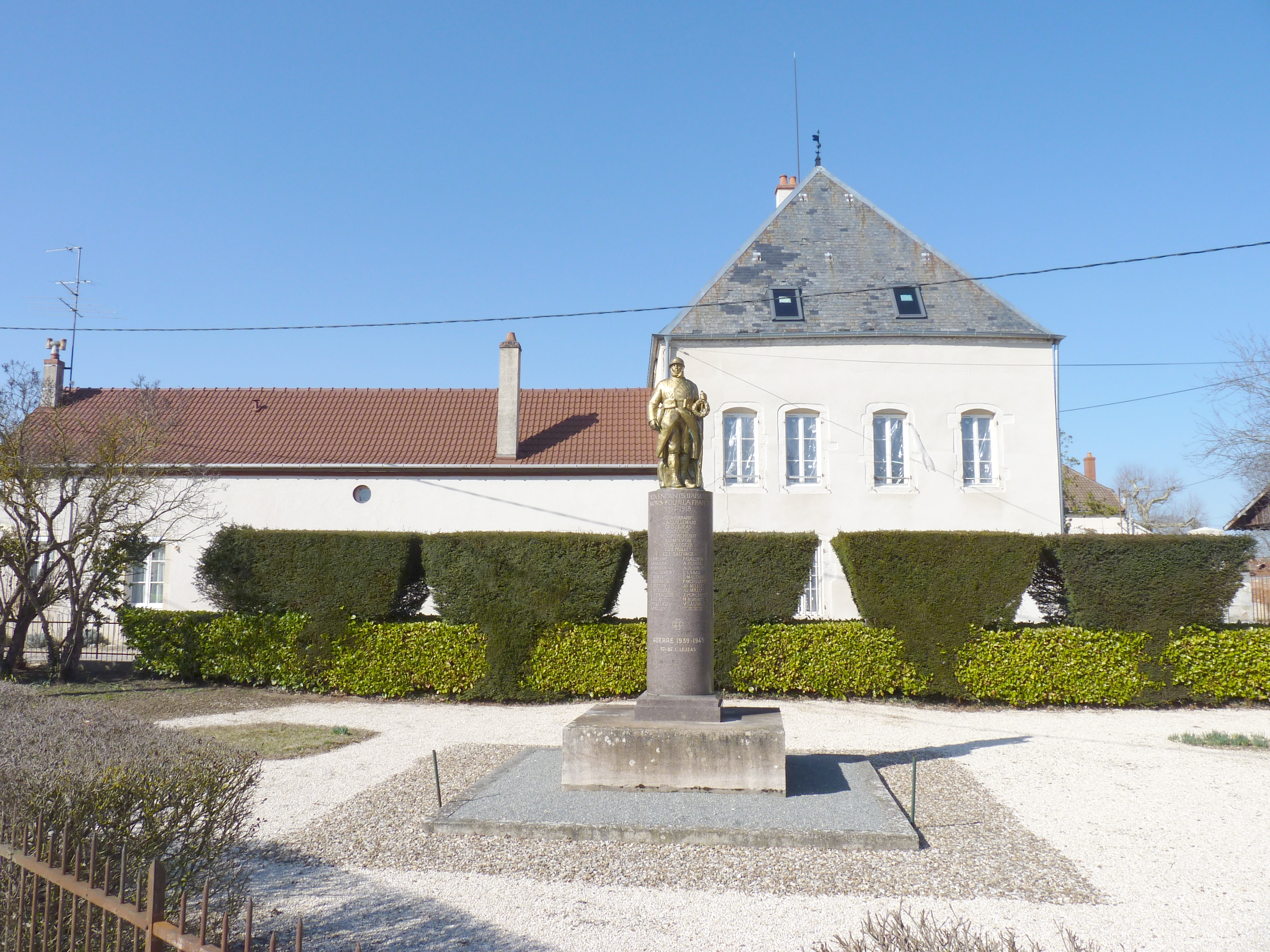
The War memorial

List of Successive Mayors of Aiserey

From	To	Name
?	1968	Abel Thivant
1968	1983	Jean Thivant
1983	1989	Jean-Louis Delatte
2001	2020	Gérard Trémoulet
2020	2026	Dominique Janin

== Population ==
The inhabitants of the commune are known as Aiseréens or Aiseréennes in French.

Historical population
Year	Pop.	±% p.a.
1968	631	—
1975	672	+0.90%
1982	863	+3.64%
1990	1,111	+3.21%
1999	1,138	+0.27%
2007	1,330	+1.97%
2012	1,342	+0.18%
2017	1,400	+0.85%
2023	1,500	+1.16%
Source: INSEE

== Economy ==
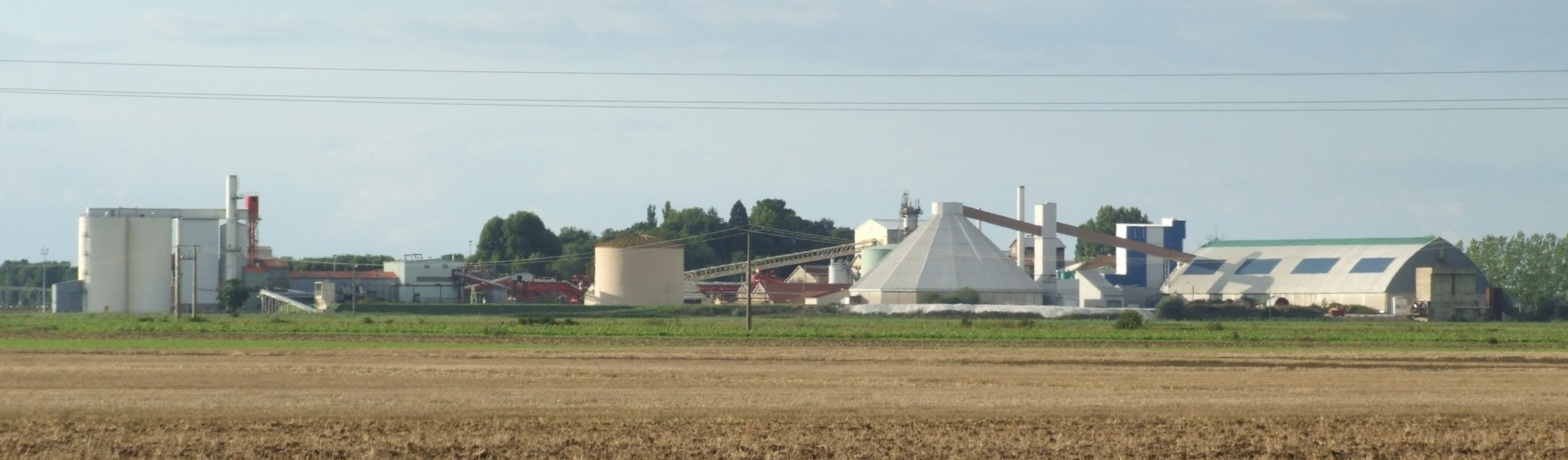
The Sugar refinery at Aiserey

The Sugar refinery at Aiserey was the only one in Burgundy but it has been closed since December 2007 and been converted into an "organic" flour mill.

== Sites and Monuments ==
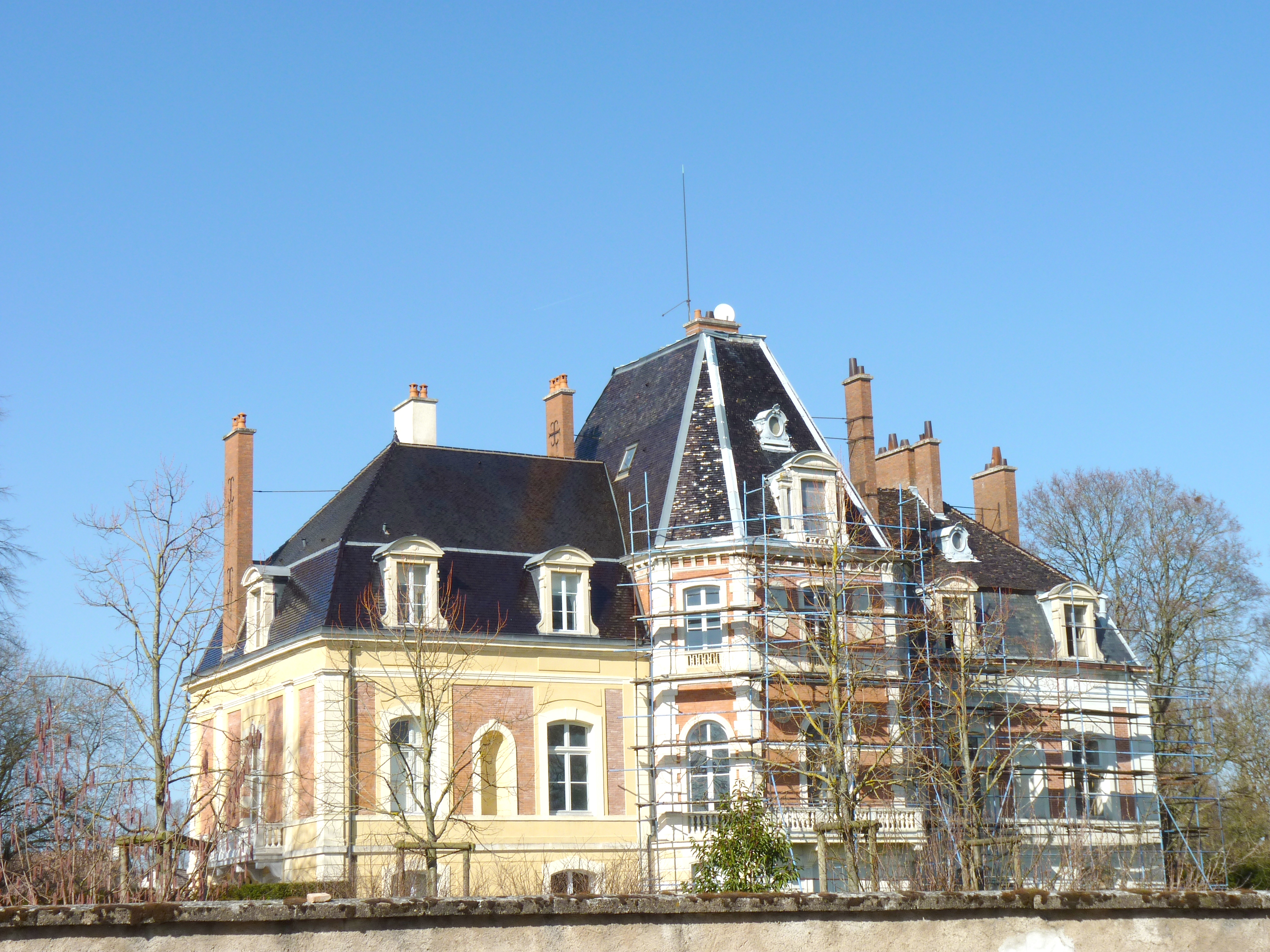
Aiserey Castle

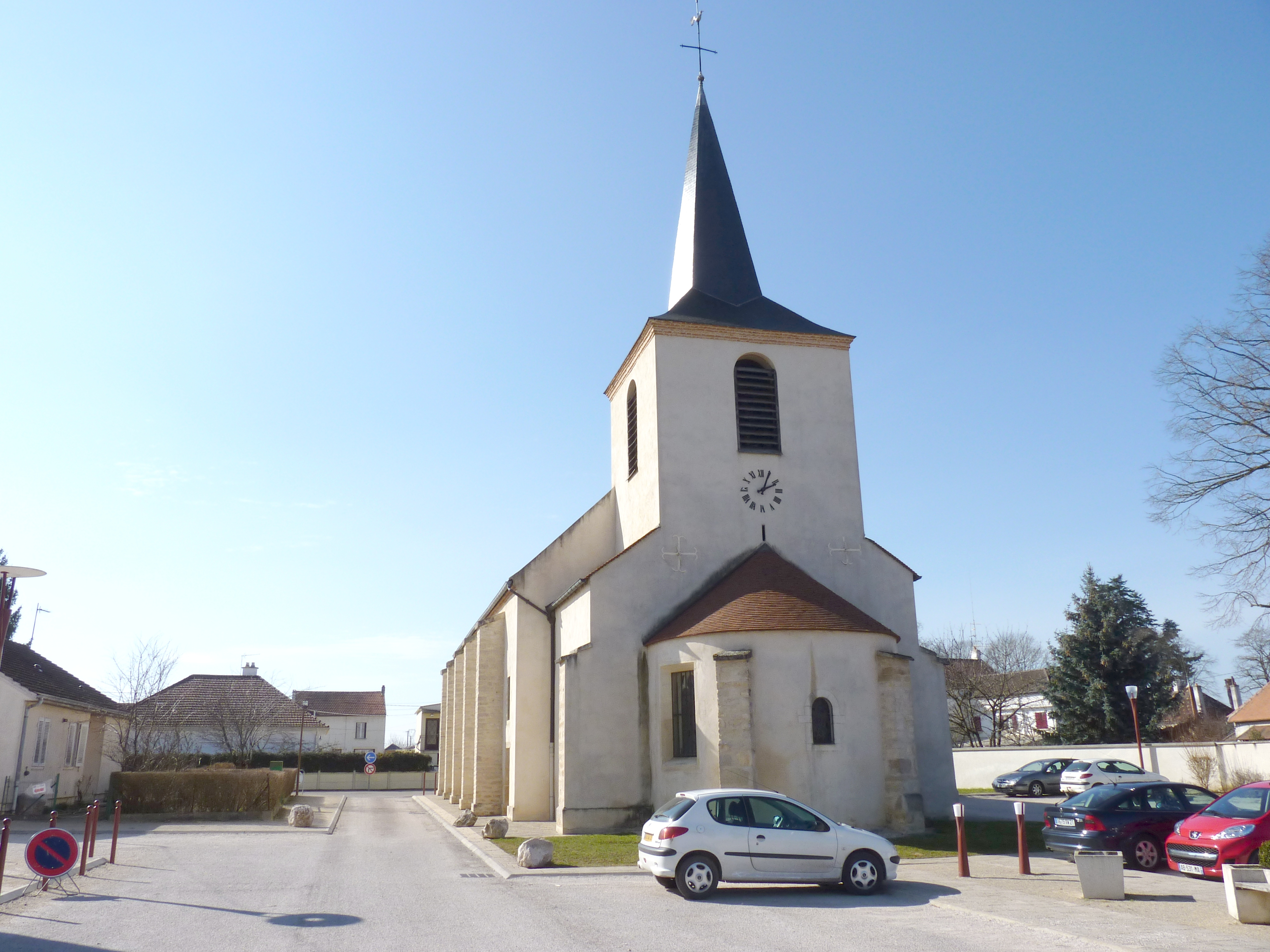
The Church

A group of Farm Buildings (19th century) are registered as an historical monument.

The two main monuments in Aiserey are its Chateau and its Church, both located in the heart of the village.

== Notable people linked to the commune ==
- Étienne Stéphane Tarnier (1828-1897), a famous French physician born in Aiserey, which also has a street named in his honour
- Claude Bossuet d'Aiserey the uncle of Jacques-Bénigne Bossuet

== See also ==
- Communes of the Côte-d'Or department
