= Tart Abbey =

Abbey in Côte-d'Or, France

Coordinates: 47°11′3″N 5°14′36″E

Cistercian abbeys in Burgundy

Tart Abbey, also Le Tart Abbey, was the first nunnery of the Cistercian movement. It was located in the present commune of Tart-l'Abbaye in Burgundy (Côte-d'Or), near Genlis, on the banks of the River Ouche and only a few miles away from Cîteaux Abbey, the Cistercian mother house. The community moved to Dijon in 1623, and the abbey buildings in Tart were destroyed by war shortly afterwards; only ruins remain.

== History ==
=== Tart ===
==== Foundation and first century ====
The foundation charter of Tart Abbey is dated 1132, although the deed mentions three previous gifts from 1125. The founder was Arnoul Cornu, lord of Tart-le-Haut, and his wife Emeline, and their gift consisted of the land of Tart, the tithes of Rouvres and Tart-la-Ville and the grange of Marmot.

It seems clear that the creation of this community was the result of a lengthy series of transactions, which may have begun in about 1120, involving not only Arnoul but the lord of Vergy (his overlord); Josserand de Brancion, Bishop of Langres; the family of Hugh II, Duke of Burgundy; the cathedral chapter of Langres; and Stephen Harding, abbot of the nearby Cîteaux Abbey.

The first abbess was Elizabeth de Vergy, widow of Humbert de Mailly, lord of Faverney or Fauverney, daughter of Savary de Donzy, Count of Chalon-sur-Saône. She was previously a novice in a Benedictine nunnery, Jully Abbey or Priory, at Jully-les-Nonnains, from where the new foundation at Tart was settled. She remained its head for the next 40 years.

Pope Eugene III put the abbey under Papal protection by a bull of 1147, confirmed by his successors.

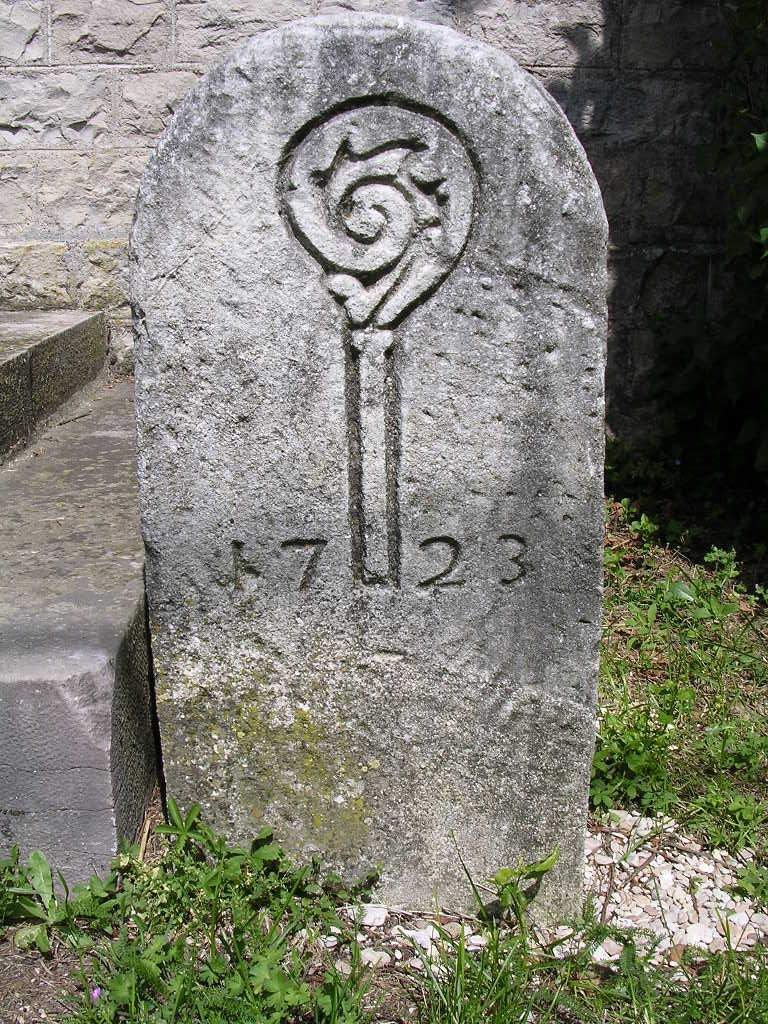
Boundary stone of Tart Abbey

Thanks to its support from the upper echelons of society, if not to more popular appeal, the abbey received sufficient endowments to ensure its financial stability through the difficult times to come. Its lands included several vineyards, and the sale of wine was a significant element in the abbey's economy: five hectares of the Vignoble de Bourgogne, others located at Beaune, Chambolle-Musigny, Morey-Saint-Denis, Chézeaux and Vosne-Romanée. Physical labour in the fields and vineyards was regarded as too strenuous for female religious, and the work was undertaken by lay brothers from Cîteaux. These were often in short supply, and the nuns were obliged to hire day-labourers to make up the shortfall.

The abbot of Cîteaux also oversaw the spiritual discipline of the nunnery and was responsible for the appointment of the abbess, who was not elected by the community, as was the practice elsewhere. Tart soon became the head of the female branch of the Cistercians, and was directly responsible for the foundation of many further nunneries in France and more in Spain.

By the end of the 13th century, when the supply of gifts was drying up, the abbey had amassed sufficient wealth, mostly in the form of land, and gained sufficient ability to manage it, to secure their future through the hardships to come, of which there were many: the Hundred Years' War, the Grandes Compagnies and the Écorcheurs, and the epidemics and calamities that these brought with them, lasted more or less right up to the start of the French Wars of Religion.

==== Decadence and reform ====
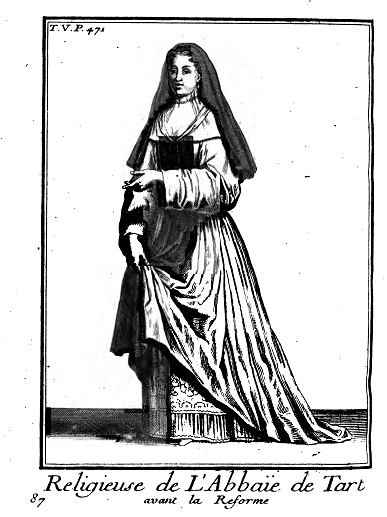
Dame de Tart: illustration from Histoire des ordres religieux et militaires, le R.P. Helyot, vol. V, 1792

For the first century of its existence, under the close supervision of the mother house at Cîteaux, Tart Abbey maintained very high standards of devotion and rigour, which assured its predominant position at the head of the women's houses of the Cistercian Order. After that, however, a decline began to set in, brought about partly by deteriorating external conditions - wars, famine, pestilence, economic crisis and so on - but also by the tendency, which affected most if not all medieval women's religious foundations, for wealthy and influential families to use them as secure accommodation for their unmarried and widowed female relatives. Such women were by no means always inclined to the religious life, and their presence in any numbers inevitably affected a community's spiritual practice and discipline for the worse. By the 16th century the abbey was in a state of advanced decadence and moral collapse, which neither bishops nor popes were able to remedy, and was notorious for its worldly life and sexual impropriety.

In 1617, however, Jeanne-Françoise de Courcelles de Pourlan (b. 1591), who had been educated as a girl at Tart, returned as abbess, with a strong determination to bring about the required reform. Despite the great resistance of the rest of the community, she found a powerful ally in Sébastien Zamet, Bishop of Langres. Opposition to the reform, inside and outside the nunnery, was so great that there was an attempt on the bishop's life. Eventually they decided that reform was impossible as long as the community remained in the abbey at Tart, and that the only way to bring it about was to transfer the nunnery to Dijon, on the basis that in a town it was far easier to maintain seclusion and the discipline of the spiritual life.

Accordingly, those of the community who were willing to accept the new and stricter life - five, plus two novices - moved to Dijon on 24 May 1623.

=== Dijon ===
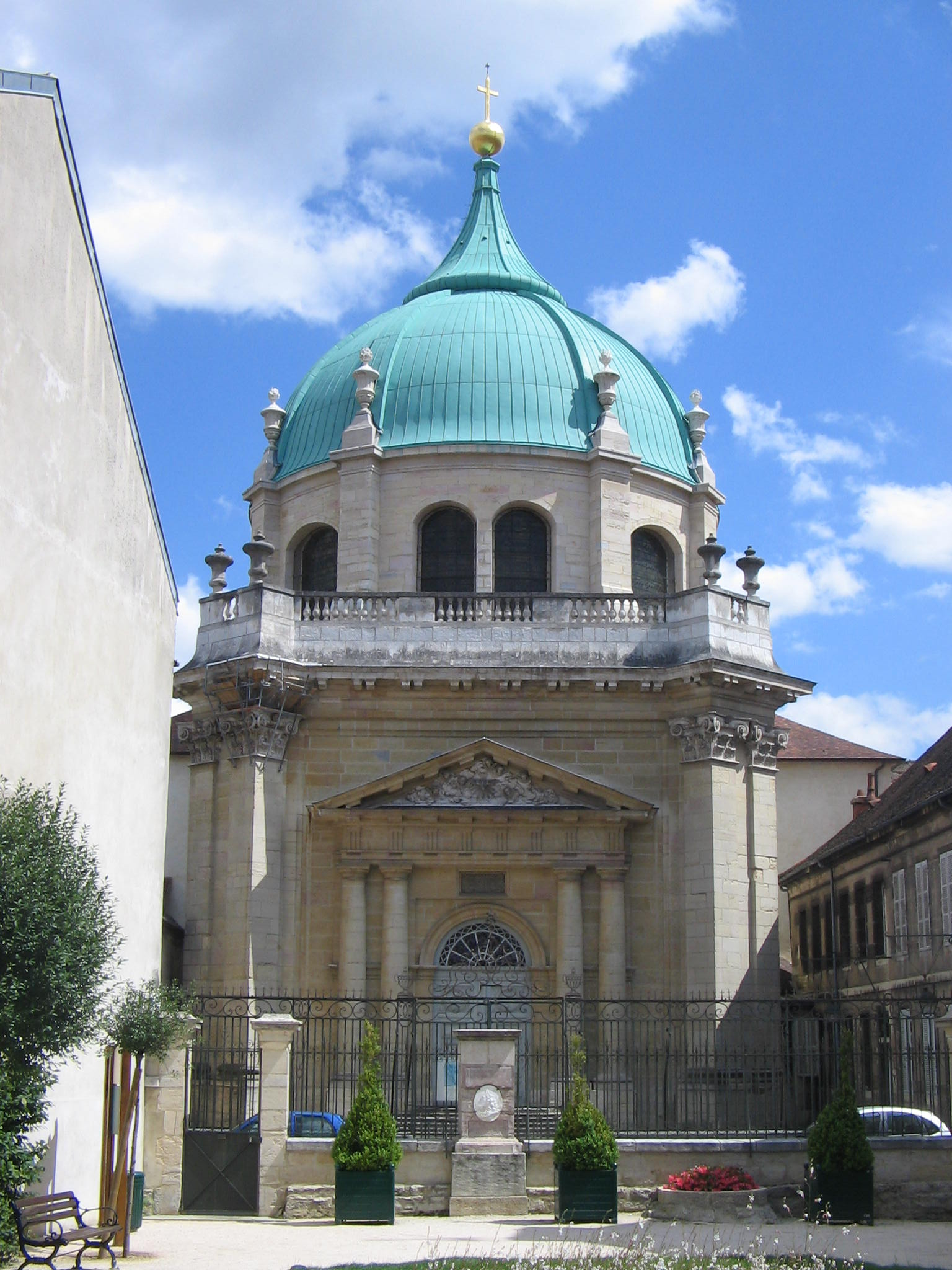
Façade of the former abbey church, Saint Anne's, now a museum

The first few years in Dijon were not comfortable. There were long delays in preparing suitable premises, made longer by the severe reduction in the income of the community in Dijon that resulted when in 1636 the troops of Matthias Gallas sacked and burnt the abbey buildings at Tart in the course of the Thirty Years' War, except for an isolated chapel.

After the election of an opponent of the reform, Pierre Nivelle, as abbot of Cîteaux, Jeanne de Pourlan (who had taken the religious name of Jeanne de Saint Joseph) put herself under the jurisdiction of the Bishop of Langres. At the same time she changed the previous system, whereby the abbot of Cîteaux had directly nominated the abbess, to a three-yearly election by the nuns.

The community was dissolved during the French Revolution. After passing through a number of uses, the buildings are now a museum of Burgundian life, the Musée Perrin de Puycousin, and the former church is now the Dijon Museum of Sacred Art (Musée d'art sacré de Dijon).

== See also ==
- List of Cistercian monasteries in France
