= Longchamp, Côte-d'Or =

Longchamp
- Commune
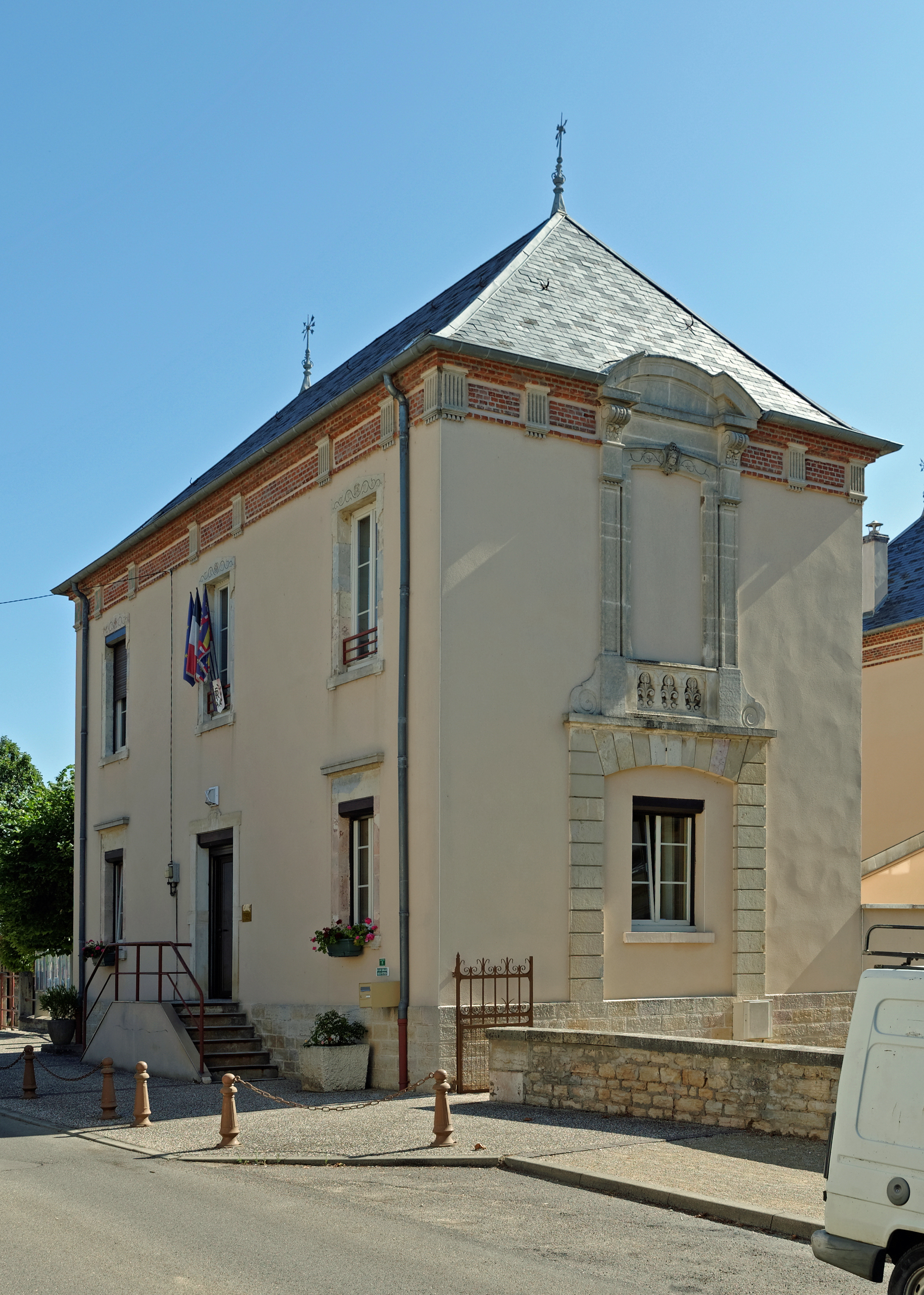
- Town hall

- Coat of arms
- Location of Longchamp
- Location within France Location within Bourgogne-Franche-Comté
- Coordinates: 47°15′41″N 5°17′17″E
- Country: France
- Region: Bourgogne-Franche-Comté
- Department: Côte-d'Or
- Arrondissement: Dijon
- Canton: Genlis
- Intercommunality: Plaine Dijonnaise

Government
  - Mayor (2024–2026): Roland Goujon
- Area^{1}: 16.23 km^{2} (6.27 sq mi)
- Highest elevation: 241 m (791 ft)
- Lowest elevation: 197 m (646 ft)
- Population (2023): 1,171
  - Density: 72.15/km^{2} (186.9/sq mi)
- Time zone: UTC+01:00 (CET)
  - Summer (DST): UTC+02:00 (CEST)
- INSEE/Postal code: 21351 /21110
- ^{1} French Land Register data, which excludes lakes, ponds, glaciers > 1 km^{2} (0.386 sq mi or 247 acres) and river estuaries.

Longchamp (French pronunciation: [lɔ̃ʃɑ̃]) is a commune in the Côte-d'Or department in eastern France.

== Population ==
Historical population
Year	Pop.	±% p.a.
1968	729	—
1975	719	−0.20%
1982	854	+2.49%
1990	1,000	+1.99%
1999	949	−0.58%
2007	1,176	+2.72%
2012	1,177	+0.02%
2017	1,168	−0.15%
2023	1,171	+0.04%
Source: INSEE

== See also ==
- Communes of the Côte-d'Or department
