= Thorey-en-Plaine =

- Commune
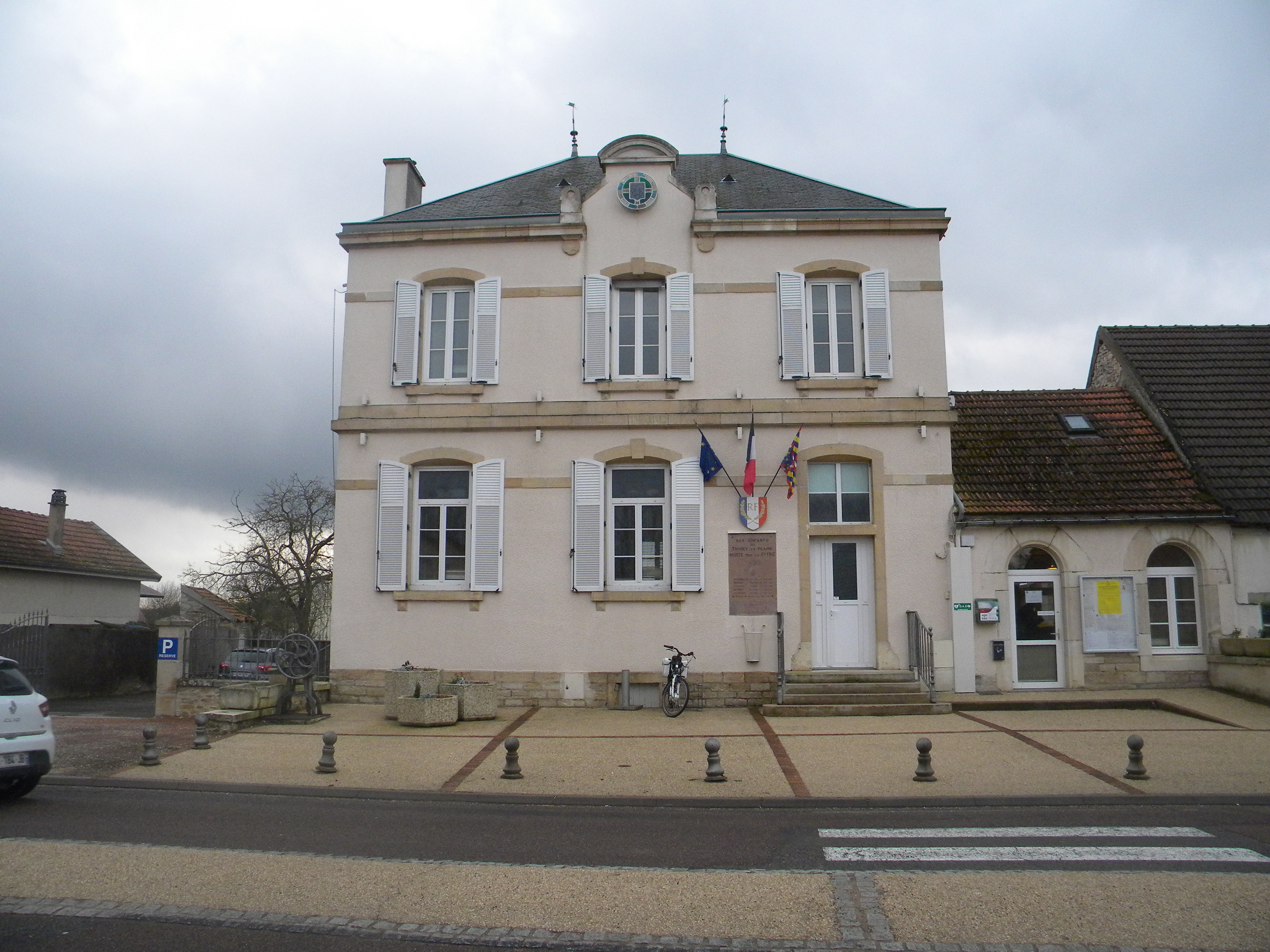
- Town hall

- Coat of arms
- Location of Thorey-en-Plaine
- Location within France Location within Bourgogne-Franche-Comté
- Coordinates: 47°12′59″N 5°08′01″E
- Country: France
- Region: Bourgogne-Franche-Comté
- Department: Côte-d'Or
- Arrondissement: Dijon
- Canton: Genlis
- Intercommunality: Plaine Dijonnaise

Government
  - Mayor (2020–2026): Gilles Brachotte
- Area^{1}: 5.82 km^{2} (2.25 sq mi)
- Highest elevation: 208 m (682 ft)
- Lowest elevation: 198 m (650 ft)
- Population (2023): 1,176
  - Density: 202/km^{2} (523/sq mi)
- Time zone: UTC+01:00 (CET)
  - Summer (DST): UTC+02:00 (CEST)
- INSEE/Postal code: 21632 /21110
- ^{1} French Land Register data, which excludes lakes, ponds, glaciers > 1 km^{2} (0.386 sq mi or 247 acres) and river estuaries.

Thorey-en-Plaine (French pronunciation: [tɔʁɛ ɑ̃ plɛn]) is a commune in the Côte-d'Or department in eastern France.

== Population ==
Historical population
Year	Pop.	±% p.a.
1968	165	—
1975	210	+3.51%
1982	413	+10.14%
1990	611	+5.02%
1999	830	+3.46%
2007	979	+2.09%
2012	1,061	+1.62%
2017	1,051	−0.19%
2023	1,176	+1.89%
Source: INSEE

== See also ==
- Communes of the Côte-d'Or department
