= Stéphane Tarnier =

French obstetrician

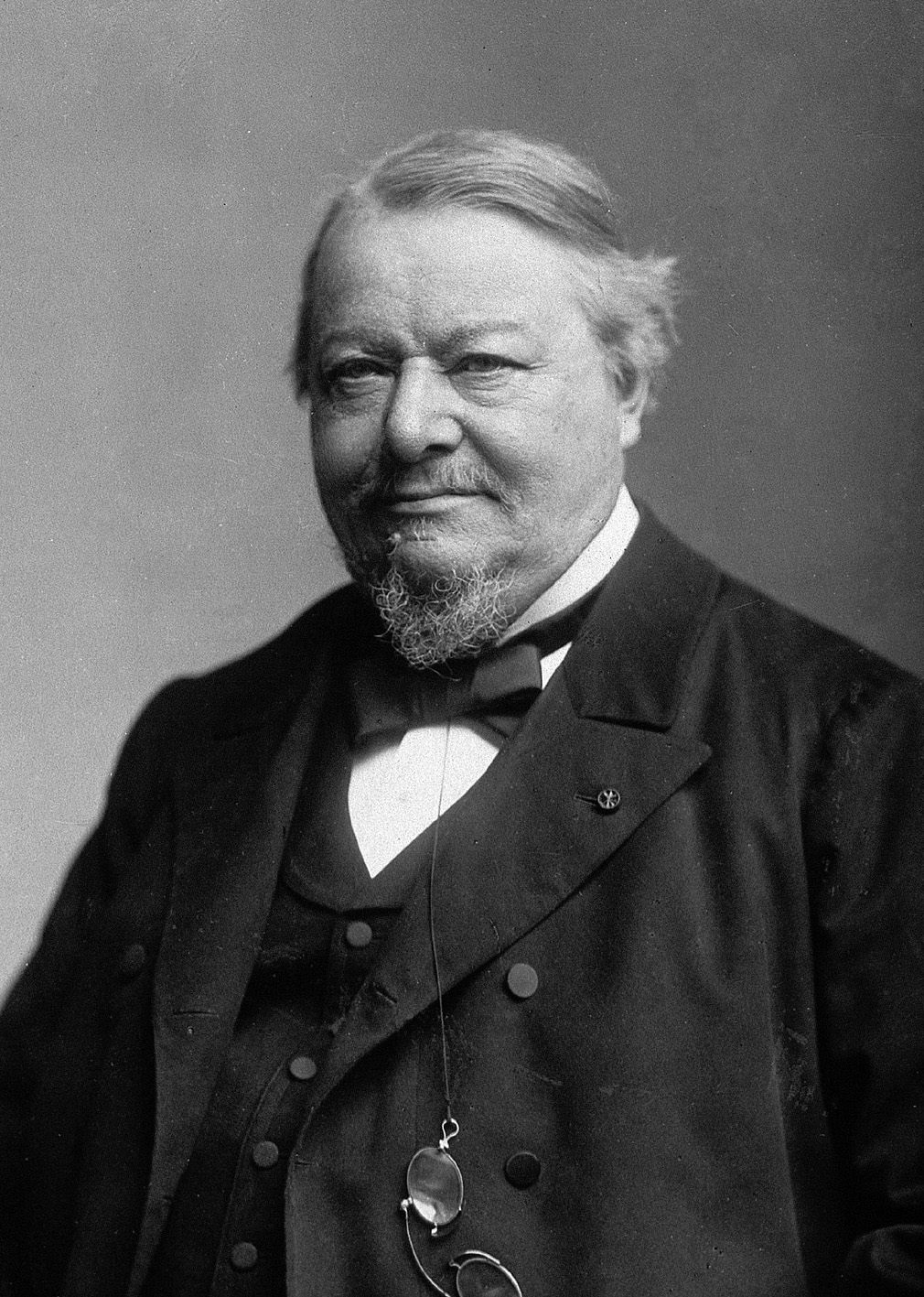

Stéphane Étienne Tarnier (29 April 1828 – 23 November 1897) was a French obstetrician who was a native of Aiserey.

He studied and practiced medicine in Paris, and is often considered as doyen of French obstetrics during the second half of the nineteenth century. Some of his better-known assistants were obstetricians Pierre-Constant Budin (1846–1907), Paul Bar (1853–1945), Alfred Auvard (1855–1940) and Adolphe Pinard (1844–1934).

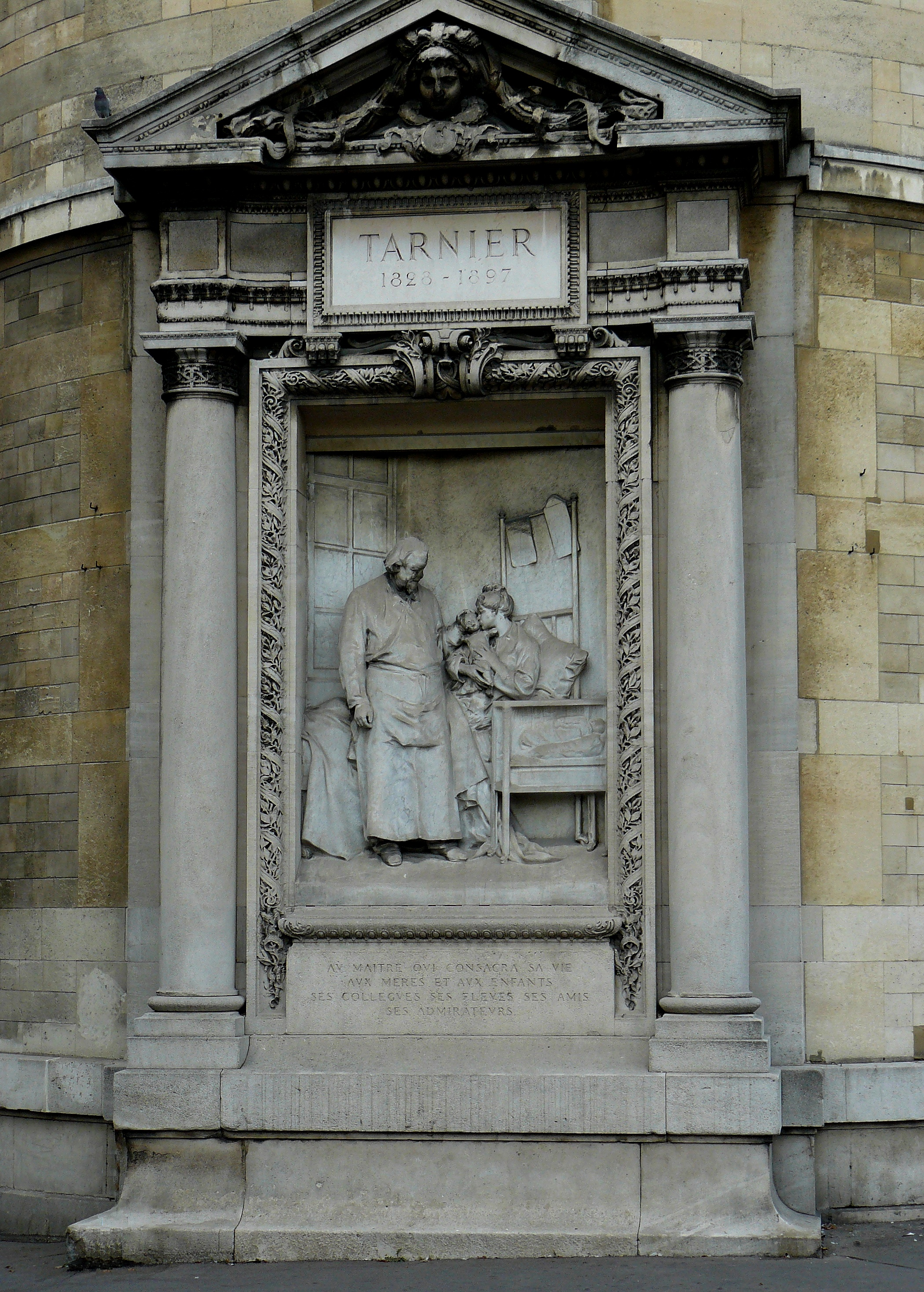
Monument of Tarnier at the corner of Avenue de l'Observatoire and Rue d'Assas, Paris

Tarnier is remembered for his work involving the perinatal aspects of obstetrics, and in particular, the treatment and well-being of premature infants. In the 1870s he realized that keeping a constant temperature was not sufficient for a premature infant's survival. He believed that isolation, hygiene, appropriate feeding, and a warm, humid environment were also necessary. Inspired by a device used to incubate poultry, Tarnier introduced prototypes of infant incubators to the Paris Maternité in 1881. These devices were basically wooden boxes with glass lids and compartments that contained hot-water bottles. He called his "baby-warming device" a "couveuse", and through it Tarnier was responsible for a 28% decrease in infant mortality over a three-year period at the Paris Maternité.

Tarnier was not the inventor of the infant incubator, but was the first to apply it for regular care of the premature. In 1857 surgeon Jean-Louis-Paul Denucé (1824–1889) provided the first description of an "incubator crib", and in 1864 obstetrician Carl Credé (1819–1892), constructed a double-wall crib that used circulated hot water to heat the walls of the crib.

In the 1880s, Dr. Auvard made modifications to Tarnier's couveuse. The "Auvard incubator" was an inexpensive device of simple design that soon became widely popular, and variants of this incubator were still in use into the 20th century. A type of axis-traction forceps called the "Tarnier forceps" is named after him.

== Selected writings ==
- De la fièvre puerpérale observée à l'Hospice de la maternité, 1858
- Mémoire sur l'hygiène des hôpitaux de femmes en couches, 1864
- Description de deux nouveaux forceps, 1877
- Traité de l'art des accouchements, 1882
- De l'asepsie et de l'antisepsie en obstétrique, 1894.
