= Tart-l'Abbaye =

- Part of Tart
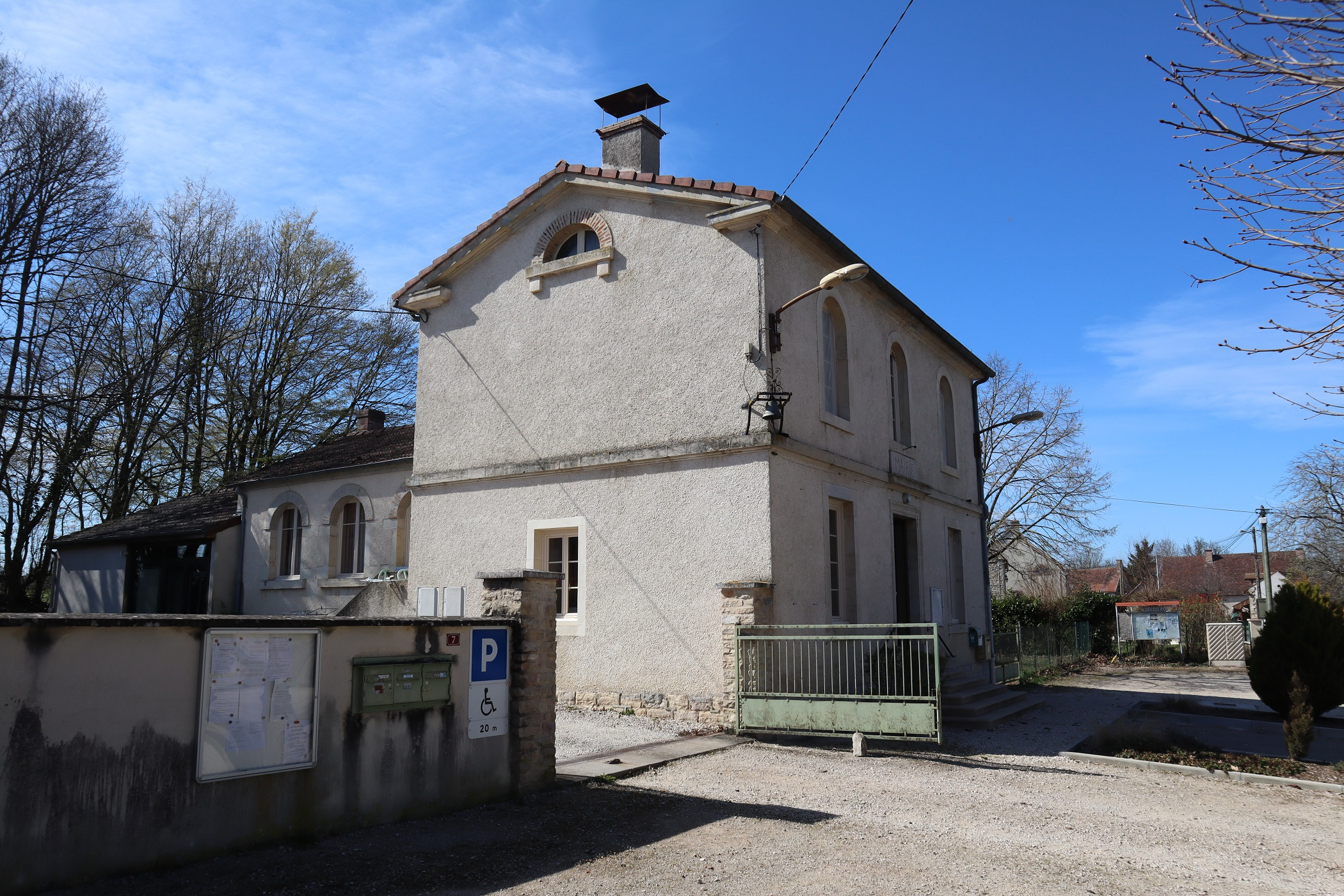
- Town hall

- Coat of arms
- Location of Tart-l'Abbaye
- Location within France Location within Bourgogne-Franche-Comté
- Coordinates: 47°11′10″N 5°14′34″E
- Country: France
- Region: Bourgogne-Franche-Comté
- Department: Côte-d'Or
- Arrondissement: Dijon
- Canton: Genlis
- Commune: Tart
- Area^{1}: 3.38 km^{2} (1.31 sq mi)
- Highest elevation: 225 m (738 ft)
- Lowest elevation: 187 m (614 ft)
- Population (2023): 192
  - Density: 56.8/km^{2} (147/sq mi)
- Demonym: Tartabasciens
- Time zone: UTC+01:00 (CET)
  - Summer (DST): UTC+02:00 (CEST)
- Postal code: 21110
- ^{1} French Land Register data, which excludes lakes, ponds, glaciers > 1 km^{2} (0.386 sq mi or 247 acres) and river estuaries.

Tart-l'Abbaye (French pronunciation: [taʁ labei]) is a former commune in the Côte-d'Or department in eastern France. On 1 January 2019, it was merged into the new commune Tart.

== See also ==
- Communes of the Côte-d'Or department
