= Labergement-Foigney =

- Commune
- Location of Labergement-Foigney
- Location within France Location within Bourgogne-Franche-Comté
- Coordinates: 47°15′29″N 5°15′02″E
- Country: France
- Region: Bourgogne-Franche-Comté
- Department: Côte-d'Or
- Arrondissement: Dijon
- Canton: Genlis
- Intercommunality: Plaine Dijonnaise

Government
  - Mayor (2020–2026): Bernard Navillon
- Area^{1}: 7.63 km^{2} (2.95 sq mi)
- Highest elevation: 230 m (750 ft)
- Lowest elevation: 196 m (643 ft)
- Population (2023): 375
  - Density: 49.1/km^{2} (127/sq mi)
- Time zone: UTC+01:00 (CET)
  - Summer (DST): UTC+02:00 (CEST)
- INSEE/Postal code: 21330 /21110
- ^{1} French Land Register data, which excludes lakes, ponds, glaciers > 1 km^{2} (0.386 sq mi or 247 acres) and river estuaries.

Labergement-Foigney (French pronunciation: [labɛʁʒəmɑ̃ fwaɲɛ]) is a commune in the Côte-d'Or department in eastern France.

== Population ==
Historical population
Year	Pop.	±% p.a.
1968	191	—
1975	244	+3.56%
1982	276	+1.78%
1990	407	+4.97%
1999	415	+0.22%
2007	425	+0.30%
2012	404	−1.01%
2017	368	−1.85%
2023	375	+0.31%
Source: INSEE

== See also ==
- Communes of the Côte-d'Or department
