= Tart, Côte-d'Or =

Tart
- Commune
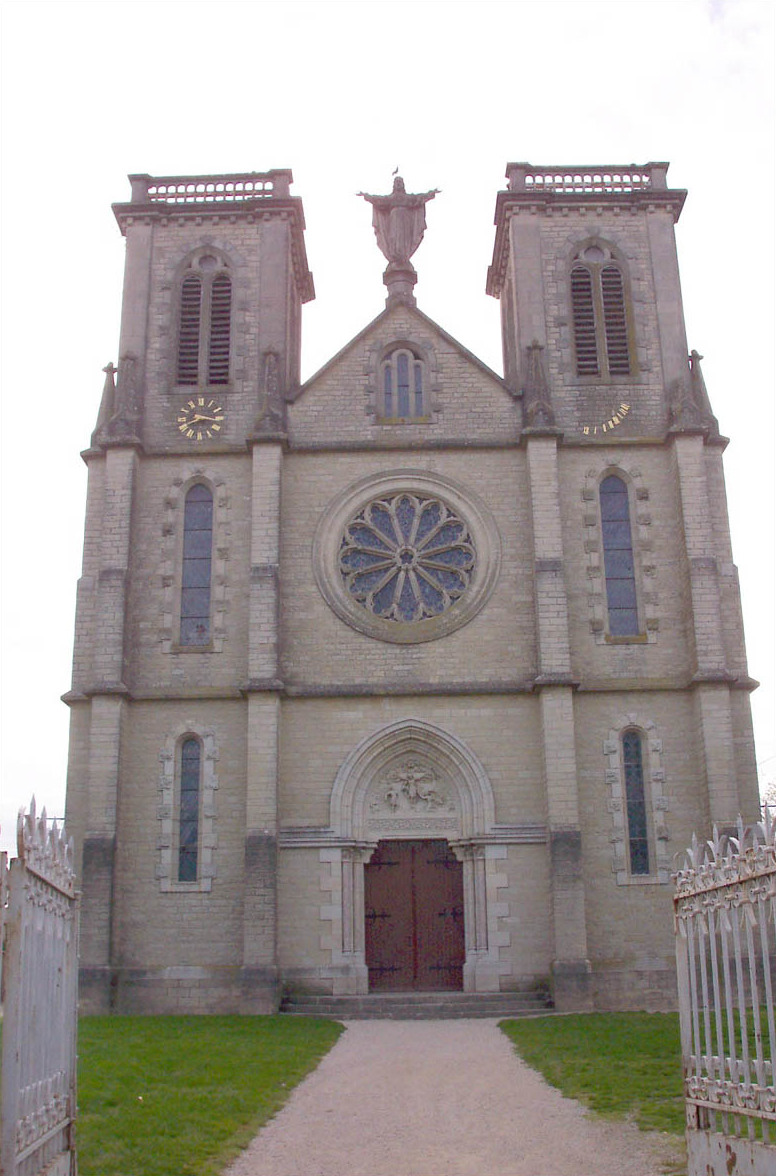
- The church in Tart-le-Haut
- Location of Tart
- Location within France Location within Bourgogne-Franche-Comté
- Coordinates: 47°12′18″N 5°12′24″E
- Country: France
- Region: Bourgogne-Franche-Comté
- Department: Côte-d'Or
- Arrondissement: Dijon
- Canton: Genlis
- Intercommunality: Plaine Dijonnaise

Government
  - Mayor (2020–2026): Daniel Bauchet
- Area^{1}: 13.68 km^{2} (5.28 sq mi)
- Highest elevation: 238 m (781 ft)
- Lowest elevation: 187 m (614 ft)
- Population (2023): 1,517
  - Density: 110.9/km^{2} (287.2/sq mi)
- Time zone: UTC+01:00 (CET)
  - Summer (DST): UTC+02:00 (CEST)
- INSEE/Postal code: 21623 /21110
- ^{1} French Land Register data, which excludes lakes, ponds, glaciers > 1 km^{2} (0.386 sq mi or 247 acres) and river estuaries.

Tart (French pronunciation: [taʁ]) is a commune in the Côte-d'Or department in eastern France. It was established on 1 January 2019 by merger of the former communes of Tart-le-Haut (the seat) and Tart-l'Abbaye.

== See also ==
- Communes of the Côte-d'Or department
