= Marliens =

- Commune
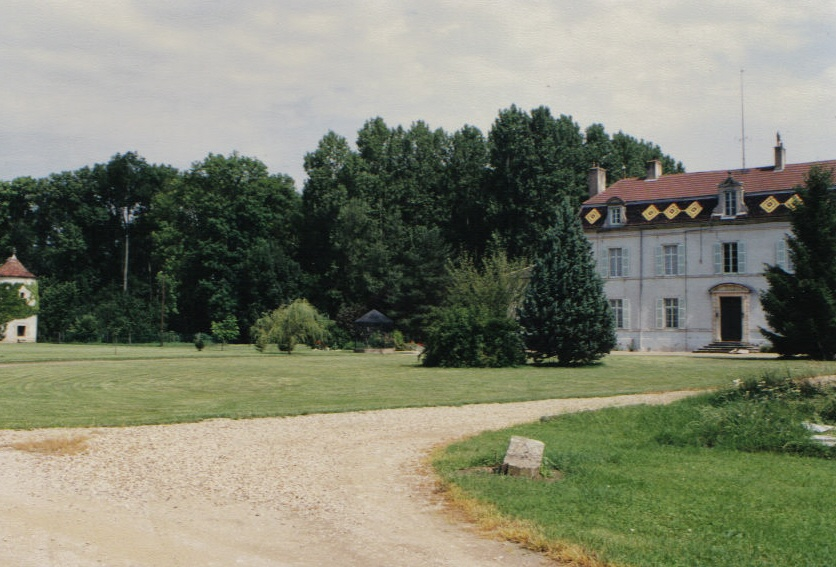
- Château

- Coat of arms
- Location of Marliens
- Location within France Location within Bourgogne-Franche-Comté
- Coordinates: 47°12′43″N 5°11′01″E
- Country: France
- Region: Bourgogne-Franche-Comté
- Department: Côte-d'Or
- Arrondissement: Dijon
- Canton: Genlis
- Intercommunality: Plaine Dijonnaise

Government
  - Mayor (2020–2026): Jean-Marie Ferreux
- Area^{1}: 4.35 km^{2} (1.68 sq mi)
- Highest elevation: 202 m (663 ft)
- Lowest elevation: 196 m (643 ft)
- Population (2023): 607
  - Density: 140/km^{2} (361/sq mi)
- Time zone: UTC+01:00 (CET)
  - Summer (DST): UTC+02:00 (CEST)
- INSEE/Postal code: 21388 /21110
- ^{1} French Land Register data, which excludes lakes, ponds, glaciers > 1 km^{2} (0.386 sq mi or 247 acres) and river estuaries.

Marliens (French pronunciation: [maʁljɛ̃]) is a commune in the Côte-d'Or department in eastern France.

== Population ==
Historical population
Year	Pop.	±% p.a.
1968	80	—
1975	101	+3.39%
1982	221	+11.84%
1990	363	+6.40%
1999	391	+0.83%
2007	447	+1.69%
2012	478	+1.35%
2017	595	+4.48%
2023	607	+0.33%
Source: INSEE

== See also ==
- Communes of the Côte-d'Or department
