= Tart-le-Haut =

- Part of Tart
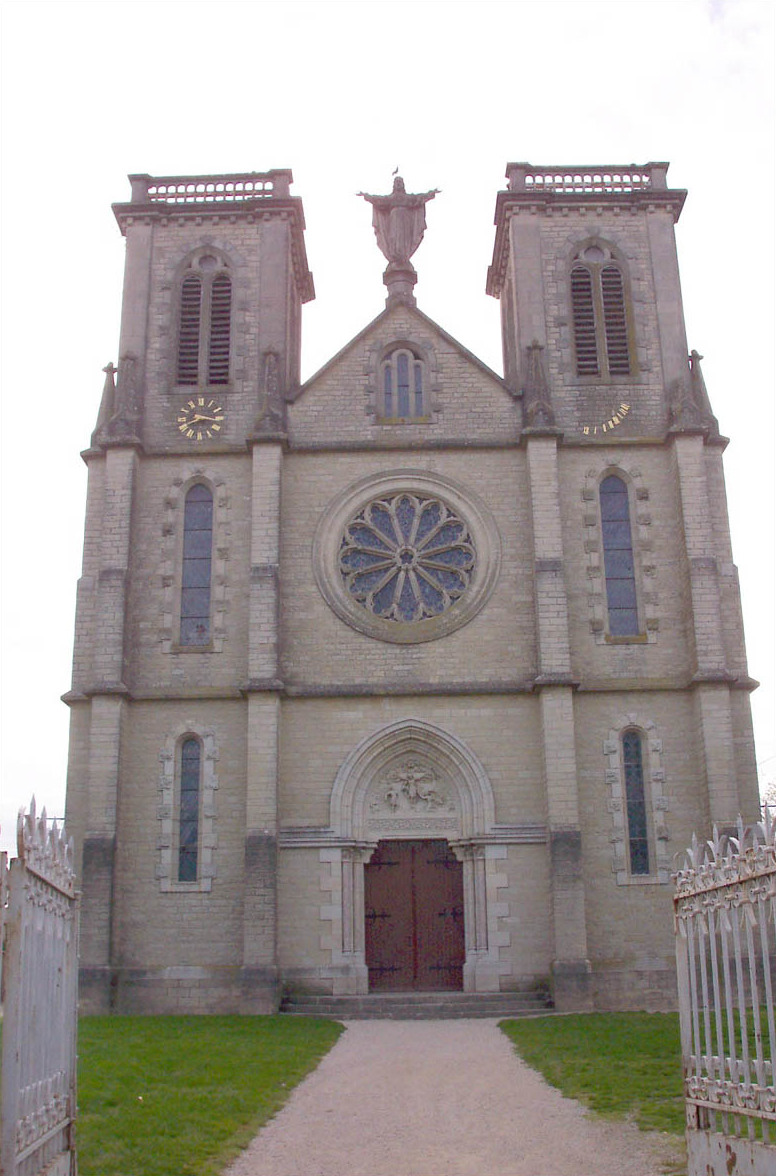
- The church in Tart-le-Haut

- Coat of arms
- Location of Tart-le-Haut
- Location within France Location within Bourgogne-Franche-Comté
- Coordinates: 47°12′18″N 5°12′24″E
- Country: France
- Region: Bourgogne-Franche-Comté
- Department: Côte-d'Or
- Arrondissement: Dijon
- Canton: Genlis
- Commune: Tart
- Area^{1}: 10.3 km^{2} (4.0 sq mi)
- Highest elevation: 238 m (781 ft)
- Lowest elevation: 193 m (633 ft)
- Population (2022): 1,341
  - Density: 130/km^{2} (337/sq mi)
- Time zone: UTC+01:00 (CET)
  - Summer (DST): UTC+02:00 (CEST)
- Postal code: 21110
- ^{1} French Land Register data, which excludes lakes, ponds, glaciers > 1 km^{2} (0.386 sq mi or 247 acres) and river estuaries.

Tart-le-Haut (French pronunciation: [taʁ lə o]) is a former commune in the Côte-d'Or department in eastern France. On 1 January 2019, it was merged into the new commune Tart.

== Population ==
Historical population
Year	Pop.	±% p.a.
1962	201	—
1968	215	+1.13%
1975	205	−0.68%
1982	405	+10.22%
1990	702	+7.12%
1999	811	+1.62%
2006	1,375	+7.83%
2022	1,341	−0.16%
Source: EHESS and INSEE

== See also ==
- Communes of the Côte-d'Or department
