= Chambeire =

- Commune
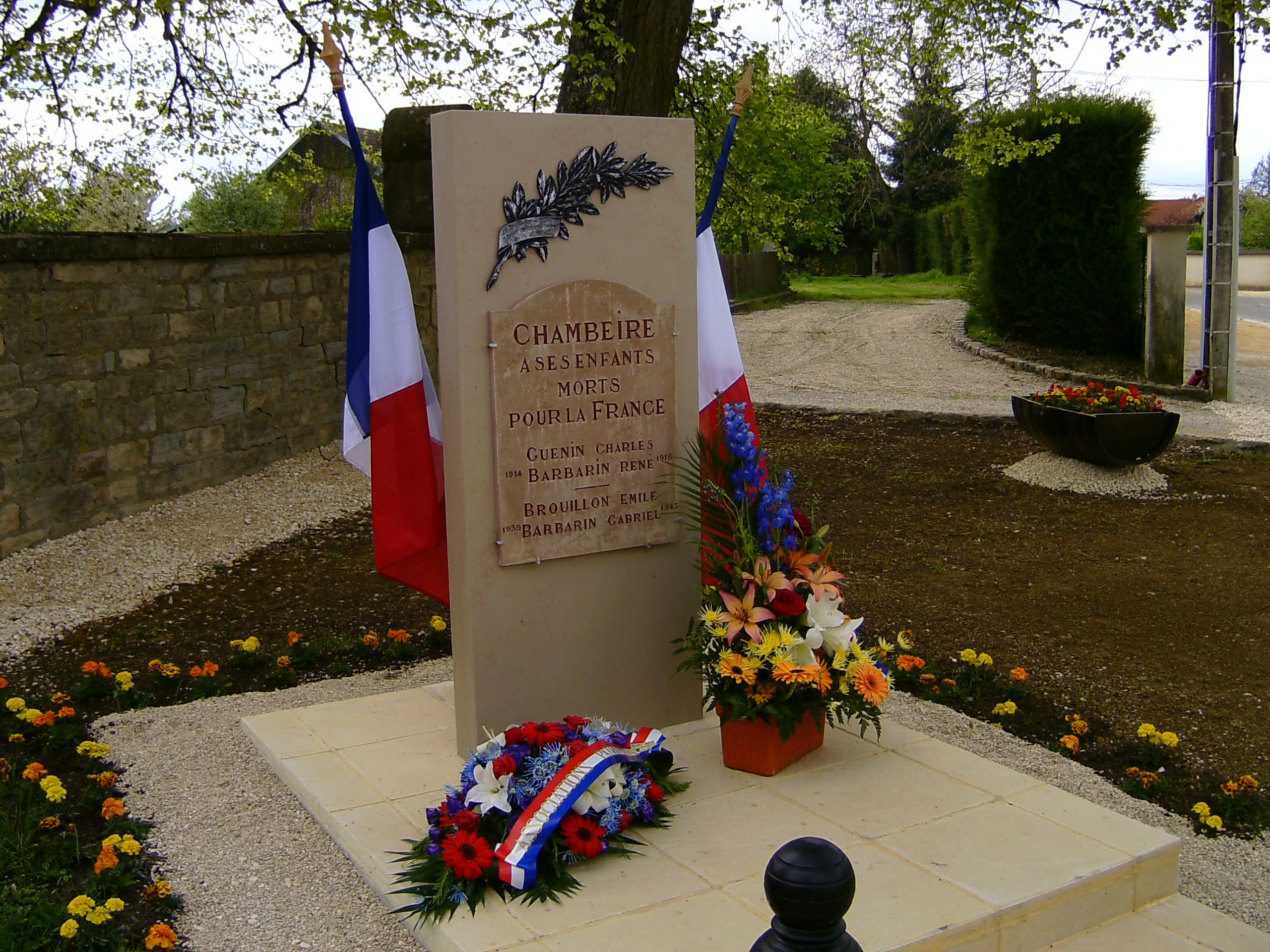
- The war memorial in Chambeire

- Coat of arms
- Location of Chambeire
- Location within France Location within Bourgogne-Franche-Comté
- Coordinates: 47°16′58″N 5°15′55″E
- Country: France
- Region: Bourgogne-Franche-Comté
- Department: Côte-d'Or
- Arrondissement: Dijon
- Canton: Genlis
- Intercommunality: Plaine Dijonnaise

Government
  - Mayor (2021–2026): Bernard Soubeyrand
- Area^{1}: 6.21 km^{2} (2.40 sq mi)
- Highest elevation: 237 m (778 ft)
- Lowest elevation: 196 m (643 ft)
- Population (2023): 420
  - Density: 68/km^{2} (180/sq mi)
- Time zone: UTC+01:00 (CET)
  - Summer (DST): UTC+02:00 (CEST)
- INSEE/Postal code: 21130 /21110
- Website: mairie-chambeire.wixsite.com
- ^{1} French Land Register data, which excludes lakes, ponds, glaciers > 1 km^{2} (0.386 sq mi or 247 acres) and river estuaries.

Chambeire (French pronunciation: [ʃɑ̃bɛʁ]) is a commune in the Côte-d'Or department in eastern France.

== Population ==
Historical population
Year	Pop.	±% p.a.
1968	143	—
1975	134	−0.92%
1982	205	+6.26%
1990	225	+1.17%
1999	233	+0.39%
2007	251	+0.93%
2012	362	+7.60%
2017	386	+1.29%
2023	420	+1.42%
Source: INSEE

== See also ==
- Communes of the Côte-d'Or department
