= Bessey-lès-Cîteaux =

- Commune
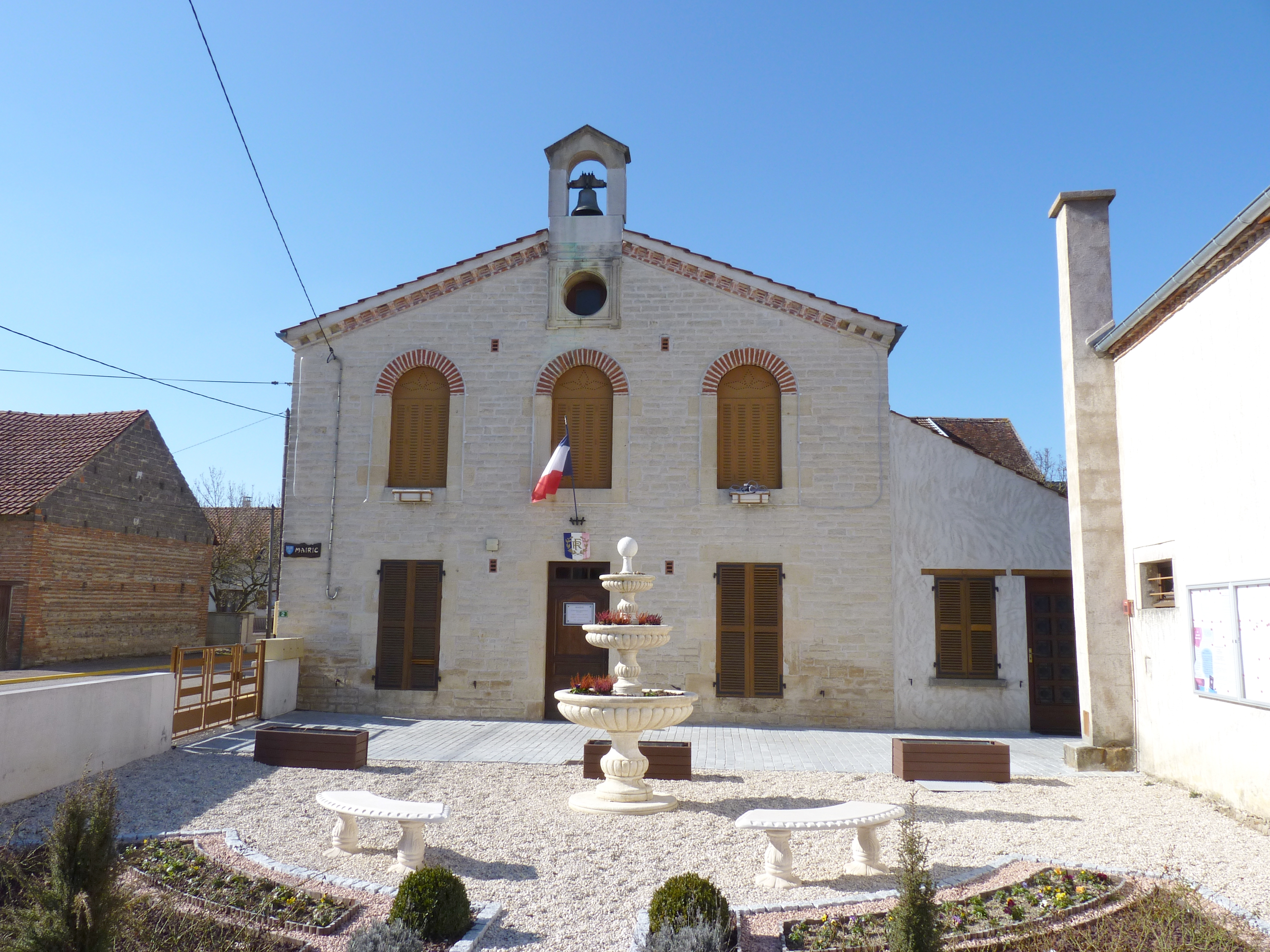
- The town hall in Bessey-lès-Cîteaux

- Coat of arms
- Location of Bessey-lès-Cîteaux
- Location within France Location within Bourgogne-Franche-Comté
- Coordinates: 47°09′22″N 5°09′35″E
- Country: France
- Region: Bourgogne-Franche-Comté
- Department: Côte-d'Or
- Arrondissement: Dijon
- Canton: Genlis
- Intercommunality: Plaine Dijonnaise

Government
  - Mayor (2020–2026): Guy Morelle
- Area^{1}: 10.3 km^{2} (4.0 sq mi)
- Highest elevation: 206 m (676 ft)
- Lowest elevation: 186 m (610 ft)
- Population (2023): 679
  - Density: 65.9/km^{2} (171/sq mi)
- Time zone: UTC+01:00 (CET)
  - Summer (DST): UTC+02:00 (CEST)
- INSEE/Postal code: 21067 /21110
- ^{1} French Land Register data, which excludes lakes, ponds, glaciers > 1 km^{2} (0.386 sq mi or 247 acres) and river estuaries.

Bessey-lès-Cîteaux (French pronunciation: [bɛsɛ lɛ sito]) is a commune in the Côte-d'Or department in Bourgogne-Franche-Comté in eastern France.

== Population ==
Historical population
Year	Pop.	±% p.a.
1968	279	—
1975	346	+3.12%
1982	469	+4.44%
1990	509	+1.03%
1999	476	−0.74%
2007	646	+3.89%
2012	685	+1.18%
2017	696	+0.32%
2023	679	−0.41%
Source: INSEE

== See also ==
- Communes of the Côte-d'Or department
