= Paul Bar =

French obstetrician

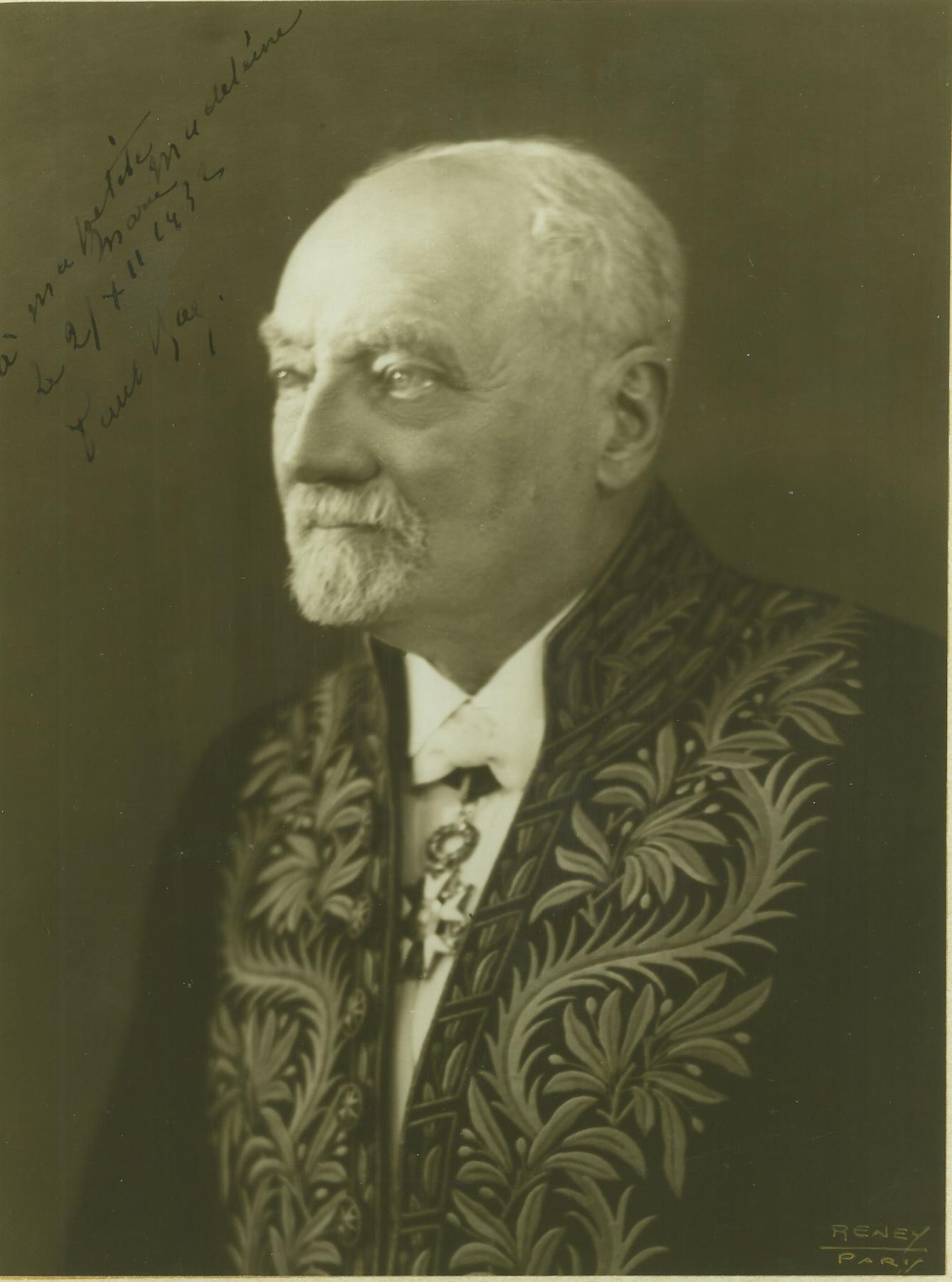
- Paul Bar (1932)
- Born: 5 November 1853; Paris, France
- Died: 26 November 1945 (aged 92); Paris, France
- Occupation: obstetrician
- Known for: work in eclampsia, twin pregnancies and craniotomy; co-founder, Société d'obstétrique de Paris
- Notable work: The principles of antiseptic methods applied to obstetric practice

Paul Bar (5 November 1853, in Paris – 26 November 1945, in Paris) was a French obstetrician.

From 1876 he worked as a hospital interne in Paris, and served as an assistant to Étienne Stéphane Tarnier at the Maternité. In 1887 he obtained his agrégation for obstetrics at the faculty of medicine, and successively worked at the hospitals Tenon, Saint-Louis and Saint-Antoine. In 1907 he succeeded Pierre-Constant Budin as professor of obstetrics to the medical faculty.

He was a co-founder of the Société d'obstétrique de Paris. In 1926 he was named president of the Académie de Médecine.

He was involved in all facets of obstetrics, being especially known for his work involving eclampsia, twin pregnancies and craniotomy. An obstetrical implement known as a pince de Bar (an umbilical cord clamp) is named after him.

== Published works ==
His book Les méthodes antiseptiques en obstétrique was later translated into English and published with the title The principles of antiseptic methods applied to obstetric practice (1887). Other noted works by Bar are:

- Leçons de pathologie obstétricale, 1900 – Lessons on obstetrical pathology.
- La Pratique de l'art des accouchements, 1914 – The practice of obstetrics.
