= Tart-le-Bas =

- Commune
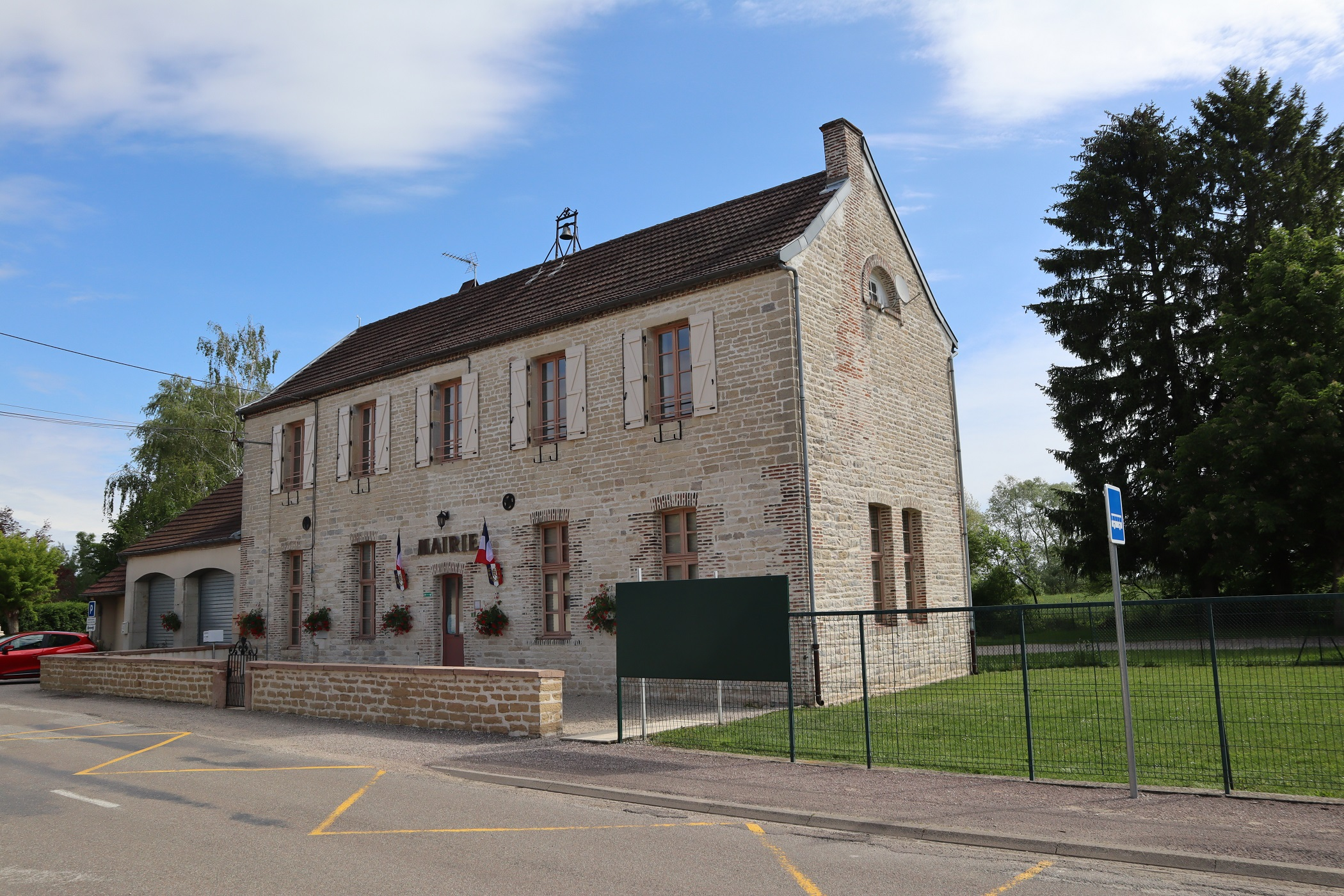

- Coat of arms
- Location of Tart-le-Bas
- Location within France Location within Bourgogne-Franche-Comté
- Coordinates: 47°12′21″N 5°13′30″E
- Country: France
- Region: Bourgogne-Franche-Comté
- Department: Côte-d'Or
- Arrondissement: Dijon
- Canton: Genlis
- Intercommunality: Plaine Dijonnaise

Government
  - Mayor (2020–2026): Marie-Paule Fontaine
- Area^{1}: 4.66 km^{2} (1.80 sq mi)
- Highest elevation: 229 m (751 ft)
- Lowest elevation: 190 m (620 ft)
- Population (2023): 241
  - Density: 51.7/km^{2} (134/sq mi)
- Time zone: UTC+01:00 (CET)
  - Summer (DST): UTC+02:00 (CEST)
- INSEE/Postal code: 21622 /21110
- ^{1} French Land Register data, which excludes lakes, ponds, glaciers > 1 km^{2} (0.386 sq mi or 247 acres) and river estuaries.

Tart-le-Bas (French pronunciation: [taʁ lə ba]) is a commune in the Côte-d'Or department in eastern France.

== Population ==
Historical population
Year	Pop.	±% p.a.
1968	157	—
1975	155	−0.18%
1982	205	+4.07%
1990	211	+0.36%
1999	195	−0.87%
2007	234	+2.31%
2012	220	−1.23%
2017	248	+2.42%
2023	241	−0.48%
Source: INSEE

== See also ==
- Communes of the Côte-d'Or department
