= Pluvet =

- Commune
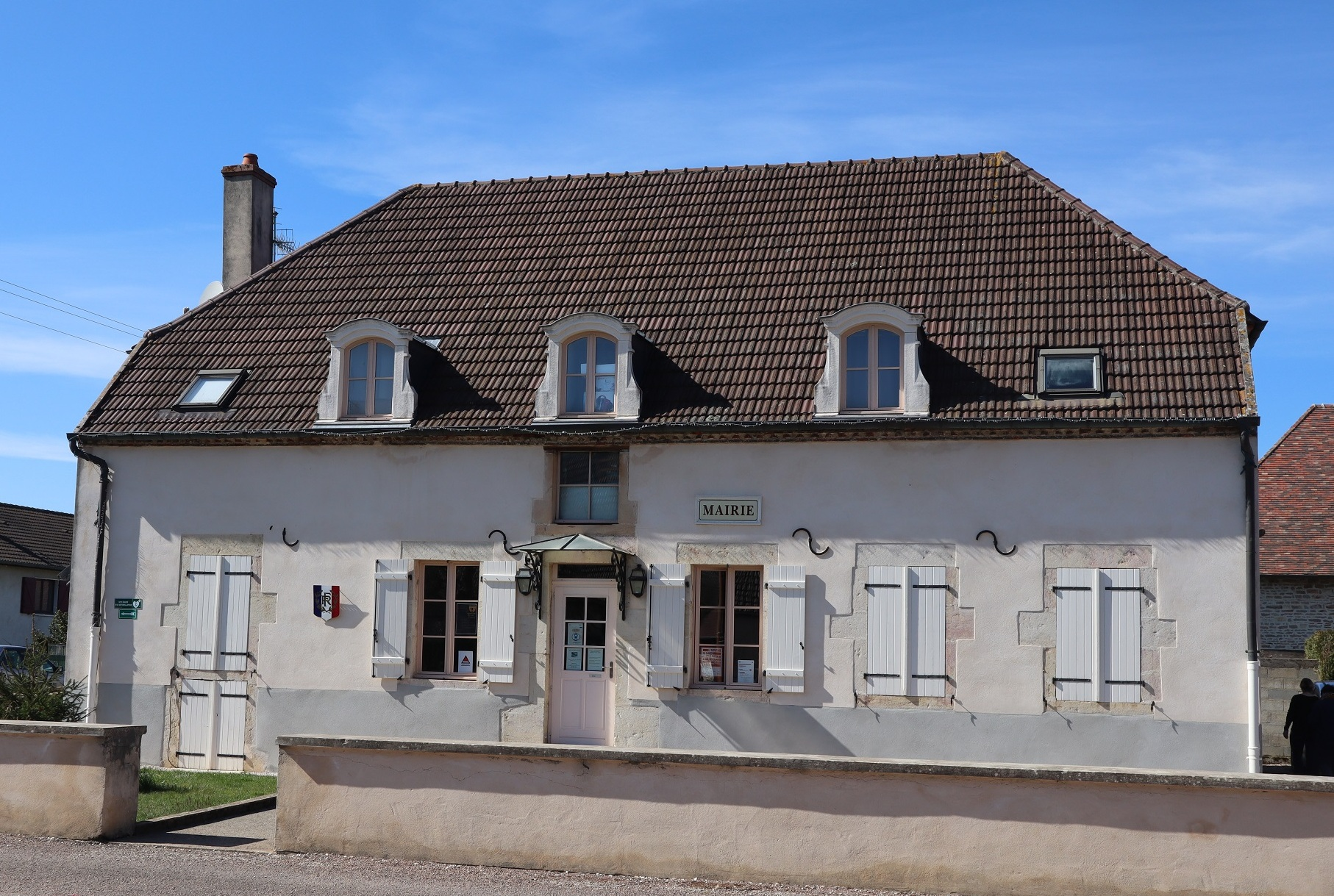
- Town hall
- Location of Pluvet
- Location within France Location within Bourgogne-Franche-Comté
- Coordinates: 47°12′18″N 5°15′55″E
- Country: France
- Region: Bourgogne-Franche-Comté
- Department: Côte-d'Or
- Arrondissement: Dijon
- Canton: Genlis
- Intercommunality: Plaine Dijonnaise

Government
  - Mayor (2020–2026): Emmanuel Pontillo
- Area^{1}: 6.51 km^{2} (2.51 sq mi)
- Highest elevation: 195 m (640 ft)
- Lowest elevation: 188 m (617 ft)
- Population (2023): 432
  - Density: 66.4/km^{2} (172/sq mi)
- Time zone: UTC+01:00 (CET)
  - Summer (DST): UTC+02:00 (CEST)
- INSEE/Postal code: 21487 /21110
- ^{1} French Land Register data, which excludes lakes, ponds, glaciers > 1 km^{2} (0.386 sq mi or 247 acres) and river estuaries.

Pluvet (French pronunciation: [plyvɛ]) is a commune in the Côte-d'Or department in eastern France.

== Population ==
Historical population
Year	Pop.	±% p.a.
1968	201	—
1975	223	+1.49%
1982	250	+1.65%
1990	267	+0.83%
1999	324	+2.17%
2007	399	+2.64%
2012	429	+1.46%
2017	412	−0.81%
2023	432	+0.79%
Source: INSEE

== See also ==
- Communes of the Côte-d'Or department
