= Izeure =

- Commune
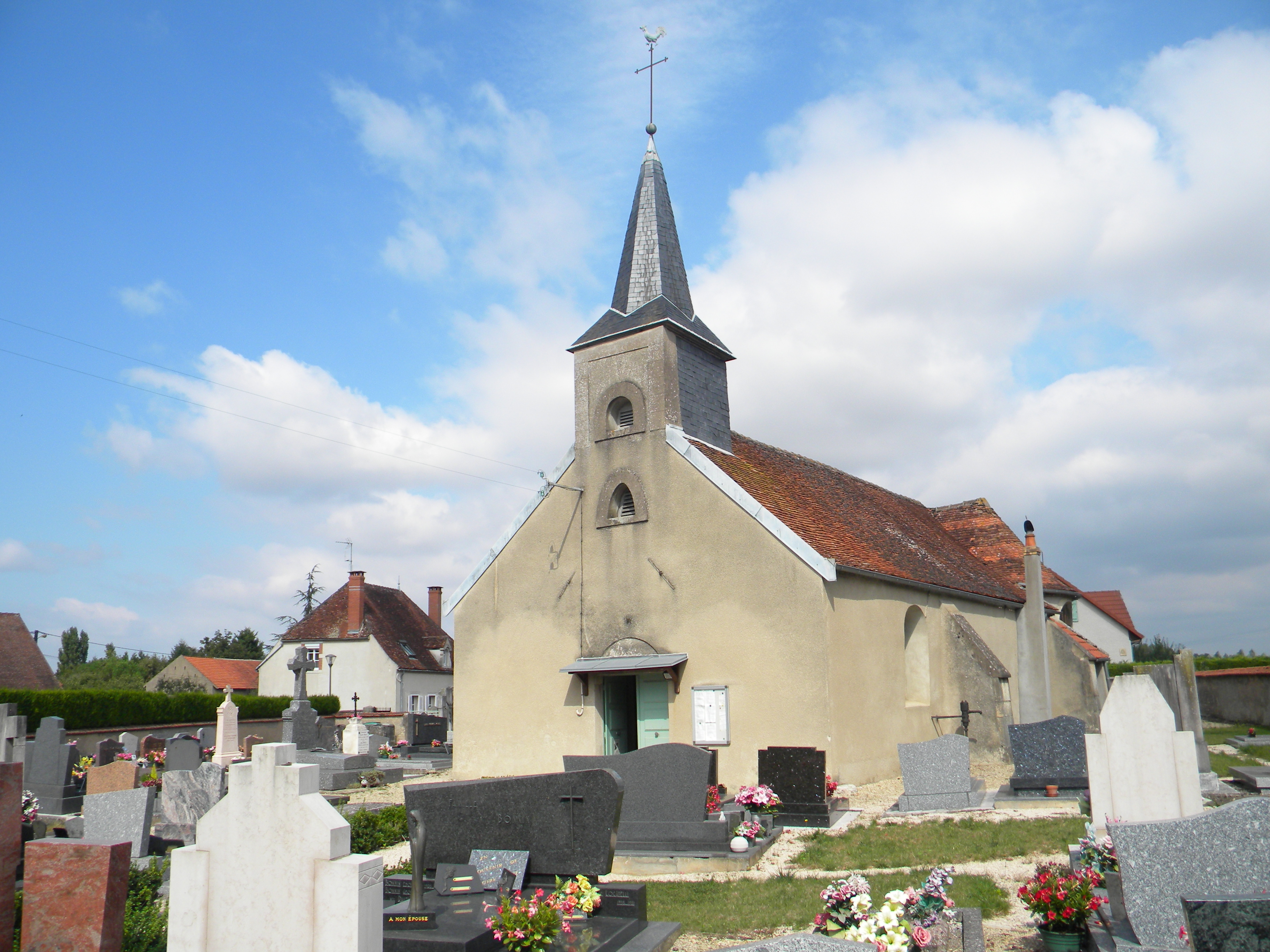
- The church in Izeure

- Coat of arms
- Location of Izeure
- Location within France Location within Bourgogne-Franche-Comté
- Coordinates: 47°10′15″N 5°08′18″E
- Country: France
- Region: Bourgogne-Franche-Comté
- Department: Côte-d'Or
- Arrondissement: Dijon
- Canton: Genlis
- Intercommunality: Plaine Dijonnaise

Government
  - Mayor (2020–2026): Martial Parizot
- Area^{1}: 16.71 km^{2} (6.45 sq mi)
- Highest elevation: 207 m (679 ft)
- Lowest elevation: 189 m (620 ft)
- Population (2023): 907
  - Density: 54.3/km^{2} (141/sq mi)
- Time zone: UTC+01:00 (CET)
  - Summer (DST): UTC+02:00 (CEST)
- INSEE/Postal code: 21319 /21110
- ^{1} French Land Register data, which excludes lakes, ponds, glaciers > 1 km^{2} (0.386 sq mi or 247 acres) and river estuaries.

Izeure (French pronunciation: [izœʁ]) is a commune in the Côte-d'Or department in eastern France.

== Population ==
Historical population
| Year | Pop. | ±% p.a. |
|---|---|---|
| 1968 | 220 | — |
| 1975 | 213 | −0.46% |
| 1982 | 314 | +5.70% |
| 1990 | 527 | +6.69% |
| 1999 | 572 | +0.91% |
| 2007 | 774 | +3.85% |
| 2012 | 772 | −0.05% |
| 2017 | 869 | +2.40% |
| 2023 | 907 | +0.72% |
Source: INSEE

== See also ==
- Communes of the Côte-d'Or department
