= Échigey =

- Commune
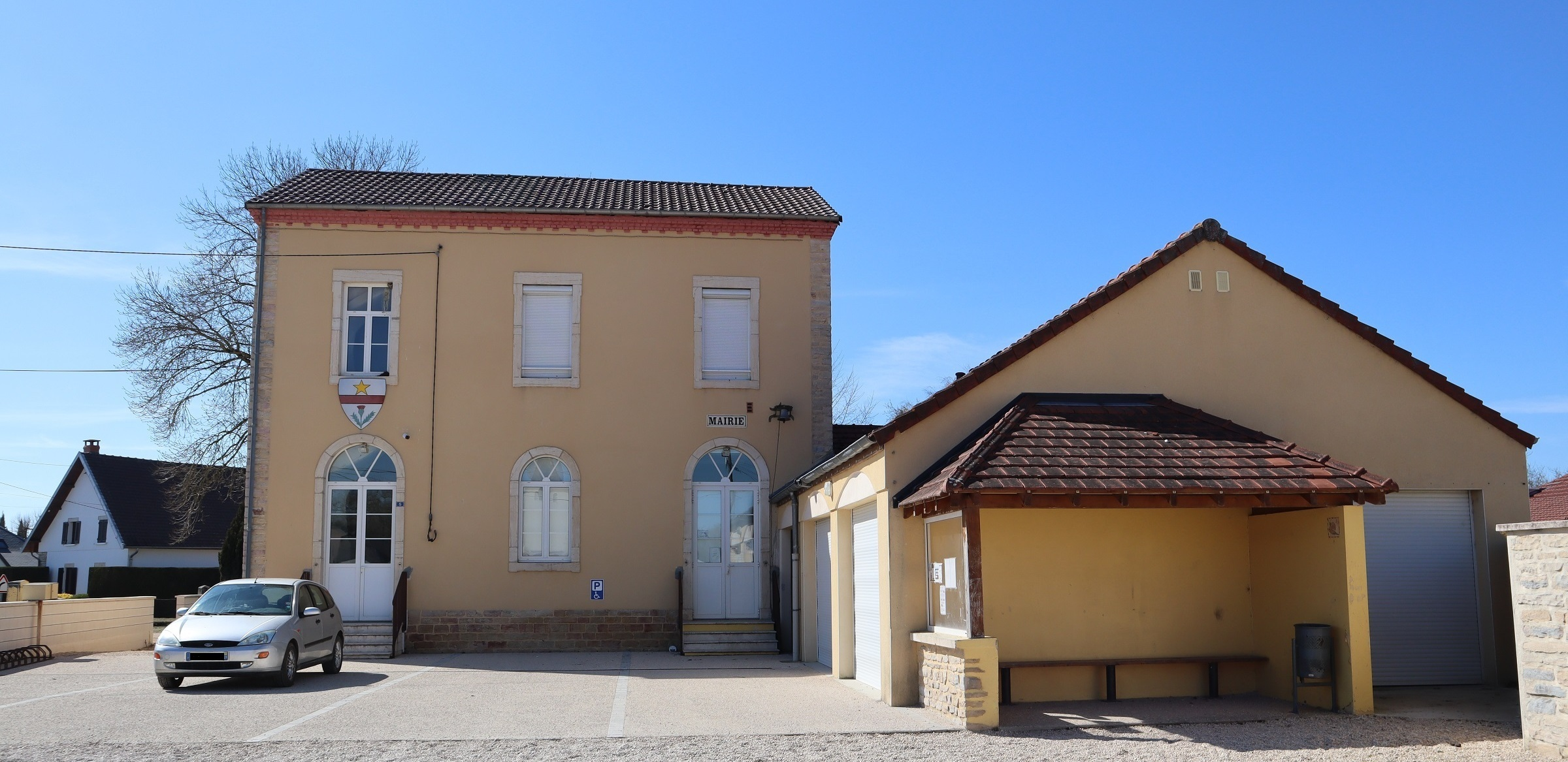
- Town hall

- Coat of arms
- Location of Échigey
- Location within France Location within Bourgogne-Franche-Comté
- Coordinates: 47°11′03″N 5°11′50″E
- Country: France
- Region: Bourgogne-Franche-Comté
- Department: Côte-d'Or
- Arrondissement: Dijon
- Canton: Genlis
- Intercommunality: Plaine Dijonnaise

Government
  - Mayor (2020–2026): Jean-Luc Auclair
- Area^{1}: 5.45 km^{2} (2.10 sq mi)
- Highest elevation: 204 m (669 ft)
- Lowest elevation: 189 m (620 ft)
- Population (2023): 316
  - Density: 58.0/km^{2} (150/sq mi)
- Time zone: UTC+01:00 (CET)
  - Summer (DST): UTC+02:00 (CEST)
- INSEE/Postal code: 21242 /21110
- ^{1} French Land Register data, which excludes lakes, ponds, glaciers > 1 km^{2} (0.386 sq mi or 247 acres) and river estuaries.

Échigey (French pronunciation: [eʃiʒɛ]) is a commune in the Côte-d'Or department in eastern France.

== Population ==
Historical population
Year	Pop.	±% p.a.
1968	110	—
1975	148	+4.33%
1982	196	+4.09%
1990	184	−0.79%
1999	214	+1.69%
2007	279	+3.37%
2012	282	+0.21%
2017	288	+0.42%
2023	316	+1.56%
Source: INSEE

== See also ==
- Communes of the Côte-d'Or department
