= Longecourt-en-Plaine =

- Commune
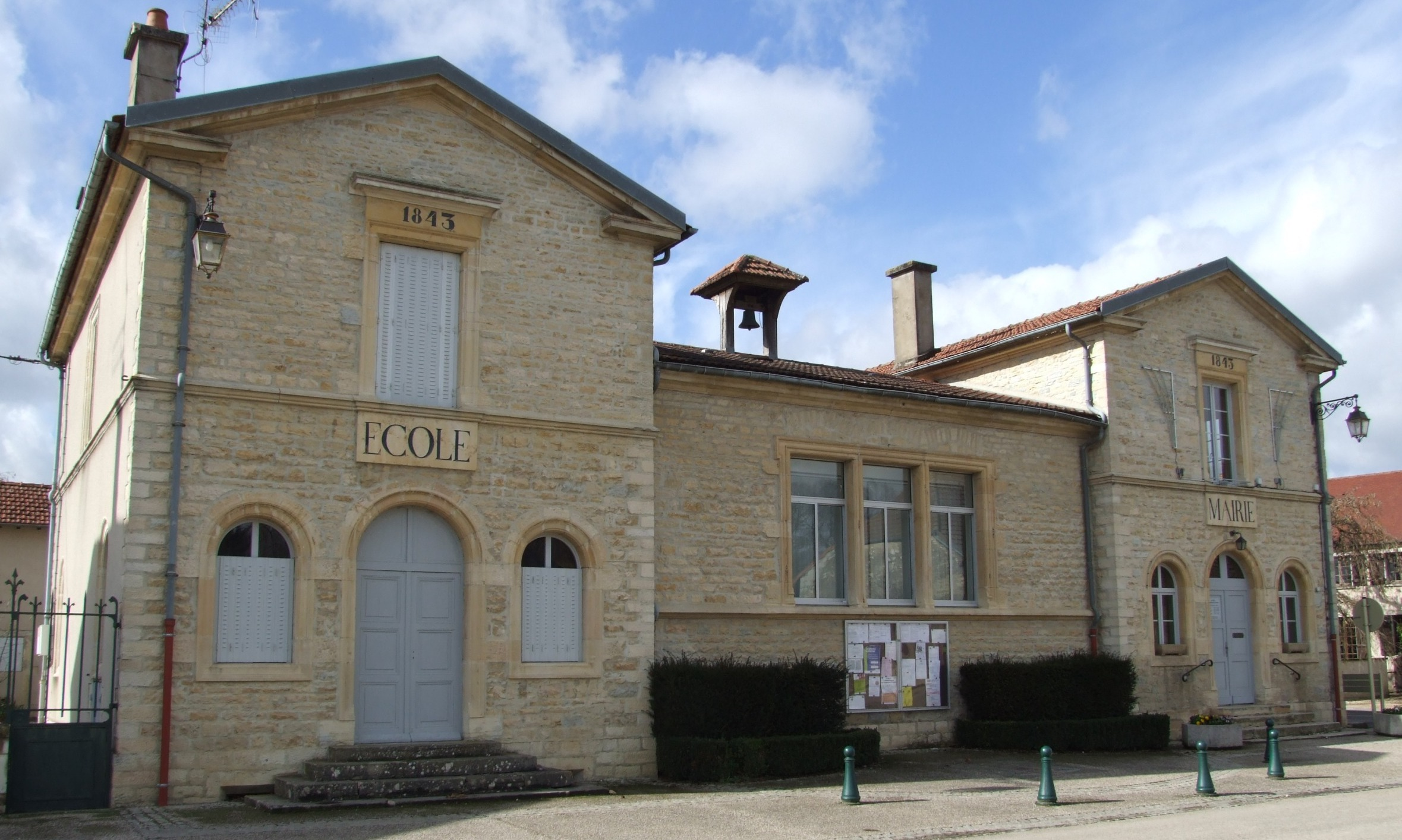
- Town hall

- Coat of arms
- Location of Longecourt-en-Plaine
- Location within France Location within Bourgogne-Franche-Comté
- Coordinates: 47°11′56″N 5°09′00″E
- Country: France
- Region: Bourgogne-Franche-Comté
- Department: Côte-d'Or
- Arrondissement: Dijon
- Canton: Genlis
- Intercommunality: Plaine Dijonnaise

Government
  - Mayor (2022–2026): Paul Murano
- Area^{1}: 10.01 km^{2} (3.86 sq mi)
- Highest elevation: 203 m (666 ft)
- Lowest elevation: 193 m (633 ft)
- Population (2023): 1,177
  - Density: 117.6/km^{2} (304.5/sq mi)
- Time zone: UTC+01:00 (CET)
  - Summer (DST): UTC+02:00 (CEST)
- INSEE/Postal code: 21353 /21110
- ^{1} French Land Register data, which excludes lakes, ponds, glaciers > 1 km^{2} (0.386 sq mi or 247 acres) and river estuaries.

Longecourt-en-Plaine (French pronunciation: [lɔ̃ʒkuʁ ɑ̃ plɛn]) is a commune in the Côte-d'Or department in eastern France.

== Population ==
Historical population
| Year | Pop. | ±% p.a. |
|---|---|---|
| 1968 | 582 | — |
| 1975 | 562 | −0.50% |
| 1982 | 713 | +3.46% |
| 1990 | 1,023 | +4.62% |
| 1999 | 1,189 | +1.68% |
| 2007 | 1,252 | +0.65% |
| 2012 | 1,209 | −0.70% |
| 2017 | 1,228 | +0.31% |
| 2023 | 1,177 | −0.70% |
Source: INSEE

== See also ==
- Communes of the Côte-d'Or department
