= Canton of Genlis =

French Canton

Coordinates: 47.24°N 5.22°E

The canton of Genlis is an administrative division of the Côte-d'Or department, eastern France. Its borders were modified at the French canton reorganisation which came into effect in March 2015. Its seat is in Genlis.

It consists of the following communes:

1. Aiserey
2. Beire-le-Fort
3. Bessey-lès-Cîteaux
4. Cessey-sur-Tille
5. Chambeire
6. Collonges-et-Premières
7. Échigey
8. Fauverney
9. Genlis
10. Izeure
11. Izier
12. Labergement-Foigney
13. Longchamp
14. Longeault-Pluvault
15. Longecourt-en-Plaine
16. Marliens
17. Pluvet
18. Rouvres-en-Plaine
19. Tart
20. Tart-le-Bas
21. Thorey-en-Plaine
22. Varanges
