= Abgar VIII =

King of Osroene from 177 to 212

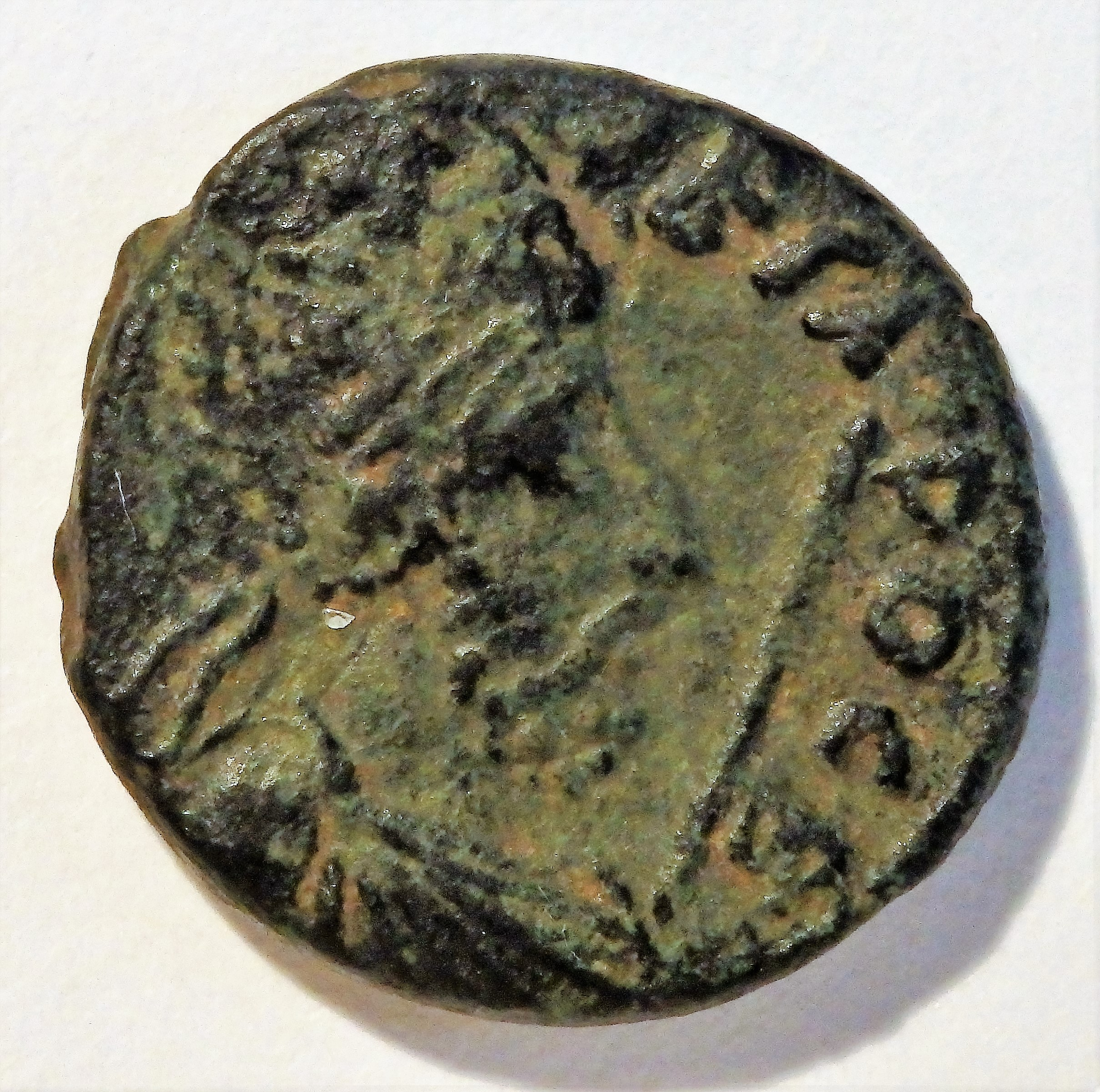
- Abgar VIII as King on the obverse of a Roman coin.

King of Osroene
- Reign: 177-212 CE
- Predecessor: Ma'nu VIII bar Ma'nu
- Successor: Abgar IX
- Born: Edessa, Upper Mesopotamia (modern-day Şanlıurfa, Turkey)
- Died: c. 212
- Religion: Christianity

Abgar VIII of Edessa, also known as Abgar the Great, (Note: It was maintained also that Abgar the Great should be regarded as Abgar IX, however, according to A. R. Bellinger and C. B. Welles, the assertion is incorrect.) or Abgar bar Ma'nu, was an Arab (Note: The Abgarid dynasty is believed to have had Arab origins.) king of Osroene from 177 CE to 212 CE. (Note: Some sources say 176-211, whilst others list both dates.)

Abgar the Great was most remembered for his alleged conversion to Christianity in about 200 CE and the declaration of Christianity as the official religion of the city at that time. It has been suggested that a cross shown on the tiara of Abgar VIII in coins he minted has a Christian meaning.

Osroene was a client state of the Roman Empire at this time. Prior to Abgar VIII taking the throne, in 165 CE the Roman military had reinstated Ma'nu VIII and they continued to have a significant presence in the region. Nevertheless, Abgar VIII's initial actions suggest that he was not wholly loyal to Rome nor was closely monitored by Rome. While Abgar VIII's coins bear the image of the Roman Emperor Commodus, Abgar's goals were to maintain a degree of independence and to extend his influence geographically as much as possible without disturbing the greater powers of Rome and Parthia.

Abgar VIII supported Pescennius Niger as Roman Emperor in 193 CE. However Pescennius Niger was swiftly challenged and deposed by Emperor Septimius Severus. Abgar VIII's submission to Septimus Severus is portrayed on the Arch of Severus in Rome. He was not deposed, but Osroene was made a Roman province and Abgar's kingdom was reduced to a rump state containing just the city of Edessa. Abgar was fully reconciled with Severus and was later received with honour as a guest of the Emperor in Rome. In an additional display of loyalty, Abgar VIII took on the Roman name Lucius Aelius Aurelius Septimus.

Christianity spread in Edessa significantly during Abgar VIII's reign. The Chronicle of Edessa (540 CE) reports that a Christian church building in Edessa was damaged in a flood in November 201 CE. The Christian philosopher Bardaisan was a member of Abgar VIII's court.

In 1904 Adolf von Harnack proposed that Lucius of Britain, a ruler mentioned in the Liber Pontificalis as contemporaneous with Pope Eleutherius, actually was Abgar of Edessa. Harnack argued that 'Britanio' was written as an erroneous expansion for 'Britio', a citadel of Edessa. Harnack's proposal has been challenged by British archaeologist David J. Knight, who argued that Abgar of Edessa was never called Lucius of Britio/Birtha in contemporary sources.

Upon his death in 212 CE, Abgar the Great was succeeded by his son Abgar IX. However, Abgar IX was summoned with his son to Rome in 213 CE and murdered on the orders of Caracalla. A year later Caracalla ended the independence of Osroene and incorporated it as a province into the Roman Empire.

== See also ==
- Abgar V

== Bibliography ==
- Ball, Warwick (2000). Rome in the east: The Transformation of an empire. Routledge. ISBN 0-415-11376-8.
- Ball, Warwick (2016). Rome in the east: The Transformation of an empire. Taylor & Francis. ISBN 978-1-317-29635-5.
- Dewing, H.B.; Kaldellis, A.; Mladjov, I. (2014). The Wars of Justinian. Hackett Classics. Hackett Publishing Company, Incorporated. ISBN 978-1-62466-172-3.
- Drijvers, H.J.W.; Healey, J.F. (1999). Der Nahe und Mittlere Osten. 1 (in German). Brill. ISBN 978-90-04-11284-1.
- Guscin, Mark (2016). The Tradition of the Image of Edessa. Cambridge Scholars Publishing. ISBN 978-1-4438-8875-2.
- Healey, John F. (2009). Aramaic Inscriptions and Documents of the Roman Period. Oxford, UK: Oxford University Press. ISBN 978-0-19-925256-5.
- Millar, Fergus (1987). "Empire, Community and Culture in the Roman Near East: Greeks, Syrians, Jews and Arabs". Journal of Jewish Studies. 38 (2): 143–164.
- Ross, S.K. (2000). Roman Edessa: Politics and Culture on the Eastern Fringes of the Roman Empire, 114 - 242 C.E. Taylor & Francis. ISBN 978-1-134-66063-6.
- Sayles, W.G. (1998). Roman Provincial Coins. Ancient Coin Collecting. Krause Publications. ISBN 978-0-87341-552-1.
- Segal, J.B. (2005). Edessa: The Blessed City. Gorgias Press LLC. ISBN 1-59333-193-2.
- Shahid, Irfan (1984). Rome and the Arabs: A Prolegomenon to the Study of Byzantium and the Arabs. Dumbarton Oaks. ISBN 0-88402-115-7.
