= Osroene (Roman province) =

Roman province (214-637)

Provincia Osroene ἐπαρχία Ὀσροηνῆς
- Province of the Roman Empire
- 214–637
- Capital: Edessa / Resaena
- Historical era: Antiquity
  - Established: 214
  - Muslim conquests: 637
Preceded by	Succeeded by
Kingdom of Osroene	Rashidun Caliphate
- Today part of: Iraq; Turkey; Syria

Osroene (Ancient Greek: Ὀσροηνή), also spelled Osrohene and Osrhoene, was a Roman province which existed for nearly 400 years. It was formed in 195 and later enlargened with parts of the former territory of the Kingdom of Osroene around 213 CE. For Rome, the province served as a frontier province against the Sassanid Empire until the Muslim conquests of the 7th century.

For the whole of its existence, the province would remain a bone of contention between the Romans and their eastern neighbors, the Sassanid Persians, suffering heavily in the recurrent Roman–Persian Wars. War broke out after the death of the Roman emperor Decius in 251 and the province was invaded by the Persians. In the second half of the 250s, the Persian shah Shapur I (r. ca. 240–270) attacked the Roman east, which was defended by the Roman emperor Valerianus (r. 253–260), whom he captured at Edessa in 260. In the next year however, Shapur was heavily defeated by Odaenathus of Palmyra and driven out of Osroene and Mesopotamia.

It was taken and retaken several times. Being a province on the frontier it had a Roman legion stationed there, Legio III Parthica and its Castrum (homebase) was Resaena though there are some doubts on that fact.

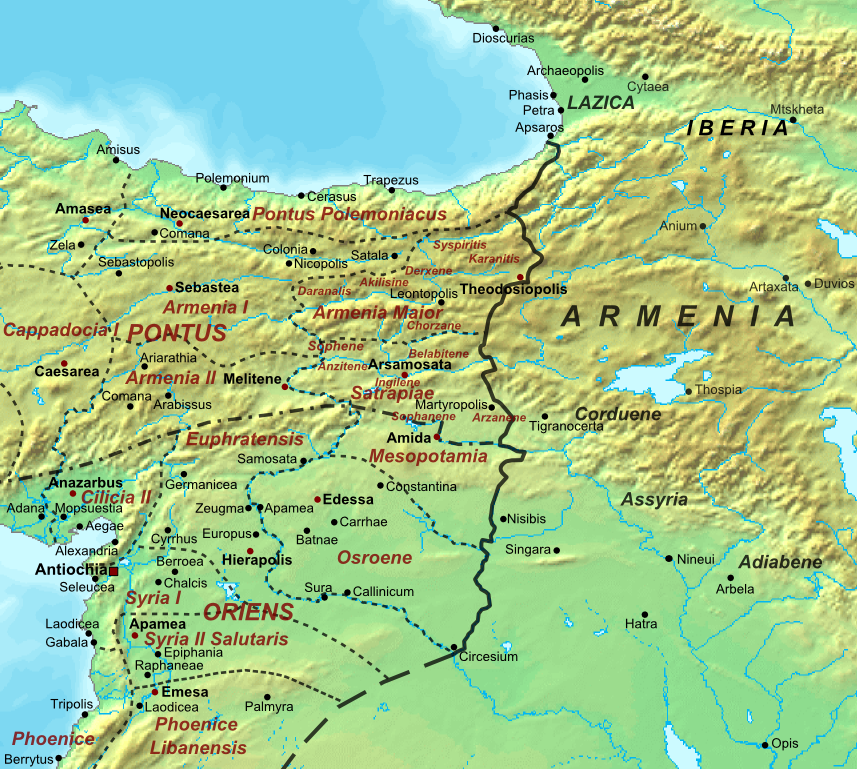
Map showing the Eastern Roman provinces, including Osroene, in the 5th century.

Since Emperor Diocletian's Tetrarchy reforms during his reign 284–305 CE, it was part of the diocese of Oriens, in the praetorian prefecture of the same name. According to the late 4th-century Notitia Dignitatum, it was headed by a governor of the rank of praeses, and was also the seat of the dux Mesopotamiae, who ranked as vir spectabilis and commanded (c. 400) the following army units:

- Equites Dalmatae Illyriciani, garrisoned at Ganaba.
- Equites Promoti Illyriciani, Callinicum.
- Equites Mauri Illyriciani, Dabana.
- Equites Promoti indigenae, Banasam
- Equites Promoti indigenae, Sina Iudaeorum.
- Equites Sagittarii indigenae, Oraba.
- Equites Sagittarii indigenae, Thillazamana.
- Equites Sagittarii indigenae Medianenses, Mediana.
- Equites Primi Osrhoeni, Rasin.
- Praefectus legionis quartae Parthicae, Circesium.
- (an illegible command, possibly Legio III Parthica), Apatna.

as well as, 'on the minor roll', apparently auxiliaries:

- Ala Septima Valeria Praelectorum, Thillacama.
- Ala Prima Victoriae, Tovia -contra Bintha.
- Ala Secunda Paflagonum, Thillafica.
- Ala Prima Parthorum, Resaia.
- Ala Prima nova Diocletiana, inter Thannurin et Horobam.
- Cohors Prima Gaetulorum, Thillaamana.
- Cohors Prima Eufratensis, Maratha.
- Ala Prima Salutaria, Duodecimo constituta.

== Sources ==
- Drijvers, Hendrik J. W. (1980). Cults and Beliefs at Edessa. Leiden: Brill. ISBN 9004060502.
- Griffith, Sidney H. (1986). "Ephraem, the Deacon of Edessa, and the Church of the Empire". Diakonia: Studies in Honor of Robert T. Meyer. Washington: CUA Press. pp. 25–52. ISBN 9780813205960.
- Griffith, Sidney H. (2002). "Christianity in Edessa and the Syriac-Speaking World: Mani, Bar Daysan, and Ephraem, the Struggle for Allegiance on the Aramean Frontier". Journal of the Canadian Society for Syriac Studies. 2: 5–20. doi:10.31826/jcsss-2009-020104. S2CID 212688584. Archived from the original on 2019-09-10.
- Harrak, Amir (1992). "The Ancient Name of Edessa" (PDF). Journal of Near Eastern Studies. 51 (3): 209–214. doi:10.1086/373553. S2CID 162190342. Archived from the original (PDF) on 2014-08-09.
- Healey, John F. (2007). "The Edessan Milieu and the Birth of Syriac" (PDF). Hugoye: Journal of Syriac Studies. 10 (2): 115–127.
- Keser-Kayaalp, Elif; Drijvers, Hendrik J. W. (2018). "Edessa". The Oxford Dictionary of Late Antiquity. Vol. 1. Oxford: Oxford University Press. pp. 516–518. ISBN 978-0-19-256246-3.
- Millar, Fergus (1967). The Roman Empire and Its Neighbours. New York: Delacorte Press. ISBN 9780440017691.
- Millar, Fergus (1993). The Roman Near East, 31 BC - AD 337. Cambridge: Harvard University Press. ISBN 9780674778863.
- Millar, Fergus (2004). Rome, the Greek World, and the East: Government, Society and Culture in the Roman Empire. Vol. 2. Chapel Hill: University of North Carolina Press. ISBN 9780807855201.
- Millar, Fergus (2006). A Greek Roman Empire: Power and Belief under Theodosius II (408–450). Berkeley: University of California Press. ISBN 9780520253919.
- Millar, Fergus (2006). Rome, the Greek World, and the East: The Greek World, the Jews, and the East. Vol. 3. Chapel Hill: University of North Carolina Press. ISBN 9780807876657.
- Mosig-Walburg, Karin (2018). "Ma'nu paṣgribā, Vater des Königs Aelius Septimius Abgar X. Ein ,king in waiting'?" [Ma'nu paṣgribā, father of King Aelius Septimius Abgar X. A 'king in waiting'?]. In Ruffing, Kai; Droß-Krüpe, Kerstin (eds.). Emas non quod opus est, sed quod necesse est. Beiträge zur Wirtschafts-, Sozial-, Rezeptions- und Wissenschaftsgeschichte der Antike. Festschrift für Hans-Joachim Drexhage zum 70. Geburtstag. Wiesbaden: Harrassowitz. pp. 371–387. ISBN 978-3-447-11087-7.
- Segal, Judah (1982). "Abgar". Encyclopaedia Iranica, Vol. I, Fasc. 2. pp. 210–213.
- Speidel, Michael A. (2007). "Ein Bollwerk für Syrien. Septimius Severus und die Provinzordnung Nordmesopotamiens im dritten Jahrhundert" [A stronghold for Syria. Septimius Severus and the provincial order of northern Mesopotamia in the third century]. Chiron. 37: 405–433.
