= Osroene =

Ancient Arab kingdom in Upper Mesopotamia (132 BC–214 AD)

Coordinates: 37.1583°N 38.7917°E

- 132 BC–AD 638
- The map above includes Osroene as a tributary kingdom of the Armenian Empire under Tigranes the Great.
- Status: Kingdom, vassal state, province
- Capital: Edessa (modern-day Şanlıurfa, Turkey)
- Common languages: Aramaic (official); Koine Greek; Arabic; Persian; Parthian; Armenian
- Religion: Christianity c. 200 AD (State religion) (contested)
- Demonym: Osroenian
- Government: Monarchy
- King
- Historical era: Hellenistic Age
  - Established: 132 BC
  - Disestablished: AD 638
Preceded by	Succeeded by
Seleucid Empire	Osroene (Roman province)

Osroene (/ɒzˈriːniː/; Ancient Greek: Ὀσροηνή), also spelled Osrhoene, was an ancient kingdom and region in Upper Mesopotamia. The Kingdom of Osroene, also known as the Kingdom of Edessa (Classical Syriac: ܡܠܟܘܬܐ ܕܒܝܬ ܐܘܪܗܝ, "Kingdom of Urhay") after its capital city (now Şanlıurfa, Turkey), existed from the 2nd century BC up to the 3rd century AD, and was ruled by the Nabataean Arab Abgarid dynasty. They were generally allied with the Parthians.

== History ==
The Kingdom of Osroene enjoyed semi-autonomy to complete independence from the years of 132 BC to around AD 213. The kingdom's population was of mixed culture, being Aramaic and then Syriac-speaking from the earliest times. The city's cultural setting was fundamentally Semitic (Syrian-Aramaic and Arab), alongside Greek and Parthian influences.

The ruling Abgarid dynasty was deposed by the Romans during the reign of Roman Emperor Caracalla (r. 211–217), probably in 213, and large parts of the kingdom of Osroene were incorporated into the already existing Roman province of the same name. Whether the kingdom of Osrhoene continued to exist as a rump state in the following decades is a matter of debate—in each case, it briefly existed during the reign of Roman emperor Gordianus III (238–244). Christianity came early to Osroene. From 318, Osroene was a part of the Diocese of the East. By the 5th century, Edessa had become a main center of Syriac literature and learning. In 608, the Sasanian emperor, Khosrow II (r. 590–628), took Osroene. It was briefly reconquered by the Byzantines, but in 638 it fell to the Muslims as part of the Muslim conquests.

== Background and context ==
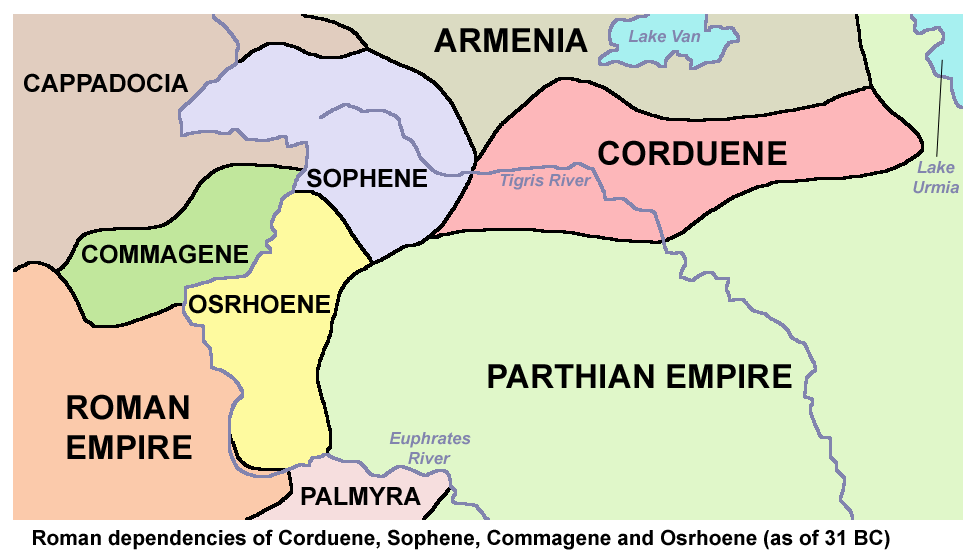
Roman dependencies, including of Osroene (as of 31 BC)

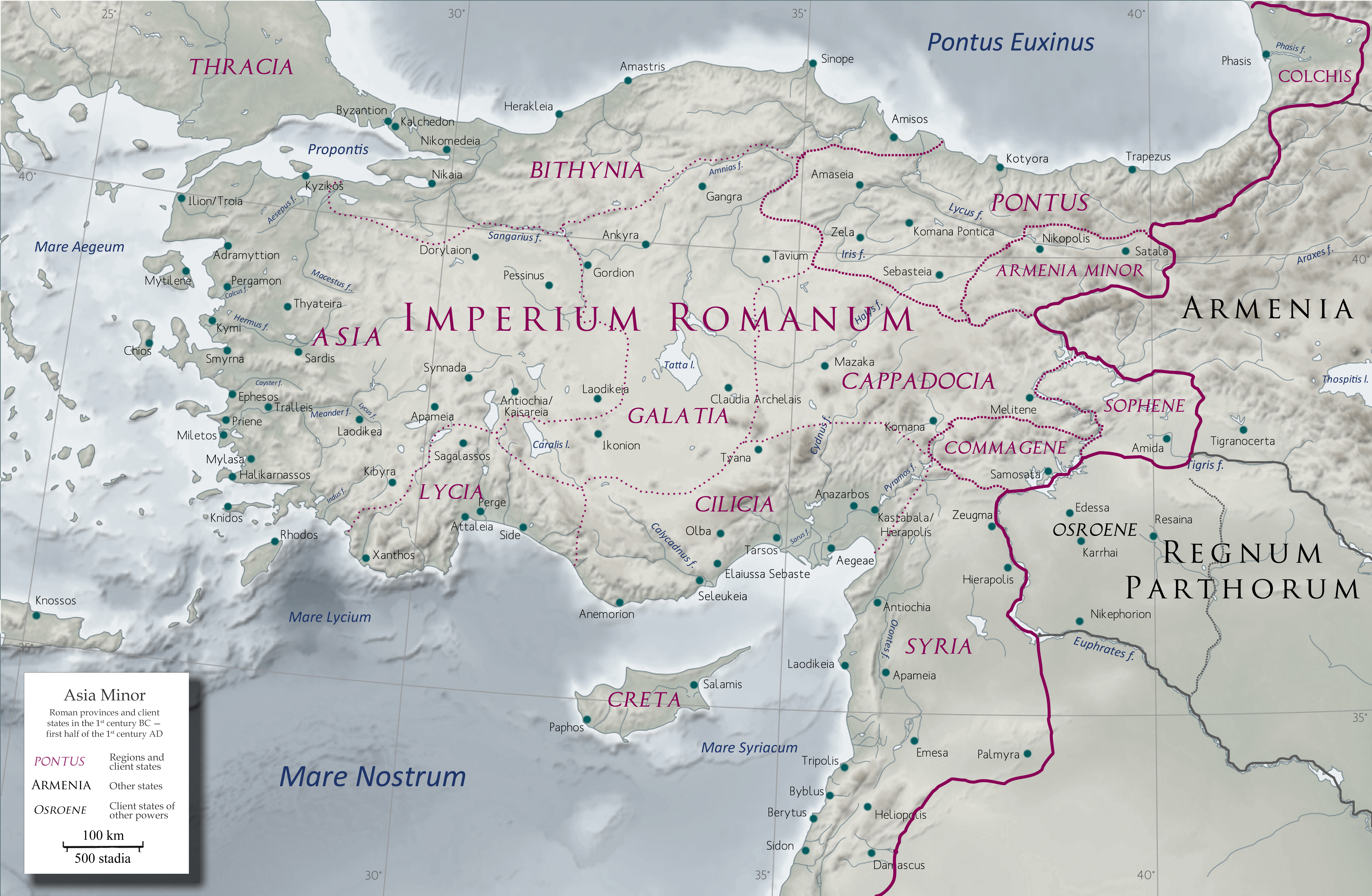
Anatolia in the early 1st century AD with Osroëne as a client state of the Parthian Empire

Kingdom of Osroene (gray shade) and the surrounding regions during the 1st century AD

Osroene, or Edessa, was one of several states that acquired independence from the collapsing Seleucid Empire through a dynasty of the nomadic Nabataean tribe from Southern Canaan and North Arabia, the Osrhoeni, from 136 BC. Osroene's name either derives from the name of this tribe, or from Orhay (Urhay), the original Aramaic name of Edessa. Arab influence had been strong in the region.

Osroene endured for four centuries, with twenty-eight rulers occasionally named "king" on their coins. Most of the kings of Osroene were called Abgar or Manu and settled in urban centers.

Osroene was generally allied with the Parthian Empire. After a period under the rule of the Parthian Empire, it was absorbed into the Roman Empire in 114 as a semiautonomous vassal state, and incorporated as a simple Roman province in 214.

== Christianity in Edessa ==
Edessa was celebrated as the first kingdom to adopt Christianity as its official religion. There were two main Christianizing movements at Edessa, one that came from Nisibis in the east in the first century and the second that came from Antioch in the west in the end of the second century. There is a mention of a Christian synod in Osroene in 197 AD but scholars have doubted its authenticity. At the end of the second century a bishop of Edessa was consecrated in Rome but had to go to Antioch to be confirmed. The connection between Antioch and Edessa became close by the end of the second century and the see of Edessa became subject to Antioch in the early third century.

Edessa was regularly described as the 'capital of Mesopotamia' in early Syriac manuscripts. The earliest dated Christian literary manuscript in any language was written in November 411 AD, a fragment of Isaiah is dated 459-60 AD, a manuscript containing Genesis and Exodus is dated 463-4 AD, and the earliest dated Gospels in any language were completed in October 510 AD, although there are undated Gospel manuscripts which probably are from the fifth century.

== "First Christian kingdom" claim contested with Armenia ==
There is an apocryphal legend, the Doctrine of Addai (late 4th or early 5th century), and an anonymous history, the Chronicle of Edessa (mid-6th century), claiming that Osroene was the first state to have accepted Christianity as state religion, but some scholars believe there is not enough evidence to support that claim.

By the end of the second century Christianity was well established in Edessa in various forms, some texts belong to the early third century and provide unambiguous evidence for Christianity at Edessa, such as the account of the flood at Edessa in 201 CE which is preserved in the Chronicle of Edessa, fragments of Bardaisan's works preserved by later writers and the Book of the Laws of the Countries written in the School of Bardaisan. By the end of the third century Christianity had spread to surrounding villages.

By c. AD 200, the Church in Edessa must have been of some size to judge from the expansion of Christianity in the early third century in Osroene and neighboring Adiabene, as according to the Chronicle of Arbela there were more than twenty bishoprics in the region bordering the Tigris in AD 224. Edessa was known as a Christian city at a very early date, but the countryside was only Christianized during the 4-5th centuries by Syriac-rite monks and ascetics of the Church of the East and the Antioch-aligned churches.

General opinion is that the official adoption of Christianity happened during the reign of Abgar VIII the Great (177 – 212), who was either Christian himself or not at all hostile to Christians, as the Christian writer Sextus Julius Africanus (c. 160 – c. 240) stayed at Abgar the Great's court in 195, and a Christian inscription was produced in Edessa, which is from the same period or few decades later than the Inscription of Abercius from 216. It is estimated that Christianity was preached in Edessa since 160 – 170, and a flood in 201 destroyed "the temple of the church of the Christians", indicating a community large enough to have had a building of notable importance to the city at the time. The earliest known Syriac writer, Bardaisan (154-222), was active in the city, and contemporary coins dated 179-192 clearly show Abgar VIII the Great wearing a tiara with a cross. The dates and circumstances of the Christianization of the kings and the Kingdom of Osroene are still debated and the claim of becoming the first Christian kingdom is contested by Armenia.

In the Church of the Virgin in Dayr al-Suryān in Egypt, built in the middle seventh century and monumental paintings applied in later centuries, a number of narrative scenes of conversion as the central theme were painted. There are remains of a painting of King Abgar of Edessa with the mandylion, while on the same wall there is a painting of Constantine the Great on horseback holding the sign of the cross in his first battle as a Christian. The paintings are making a clear statement: Constantine was the first Christian Roman emperor but Edessa had a Christian king almost three centuries before. On an opposite wall fragments are preserved of St. Gregory the Illuminator's conversion of the Armenians. The unique conversion scenes were probably painted as a carefully planned addition after the eighth century, covering scenes of the Pentecost, and it is possible that the church building had a geographical symbolism as Ethiopia is equaled with the south, Armenia with the north, and Byzantium and Edessa with the east. The first Armenian Christian king Tiridates the Great is absent from the depiction.

== Population and culture ==
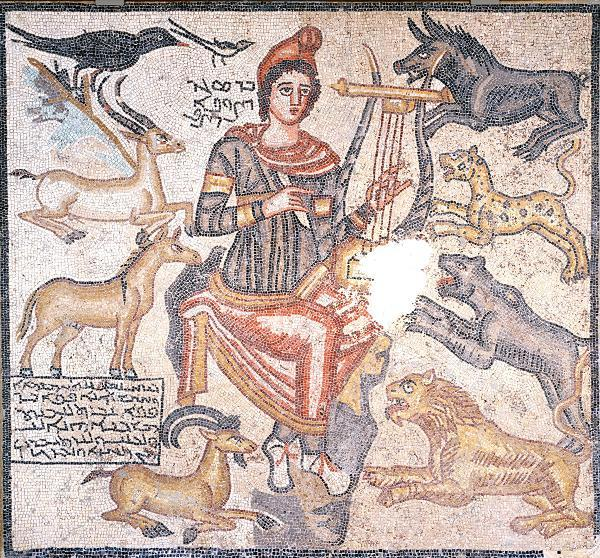
Ancient mosaic from Edessa (2nd century AD) with inscriptions in the Aramaic language

Most of Osroene's rulers were sedentarized Arabs from the Nabataean Abgarid dynasty, and the kingdom's population was primarily of mixed Semitic origins, being Aramaic-speaking from the earliest times. Before emerging as an early and important center for Syriac Christianity, Edessa was a major centre for cult worship in the Near East, with devotees of Atargatis and Sabians mixing with those of Mesopotamian/Palmyrene Bel and Nabataean Dushara worshippers, among other pre-Islamic Arabian cults (such as the twins Monimos and Azizos).. Its overall cultural setting was hybridized and syncretic, incorporating Babylonian, Aramaean, Arab, Jewish, Iranian, Indian and Hellenistic influences. A centre of local reaction against Hellenism, its Arab dynasts became increasingly influenced by Syriac Christianity, presaging Rome's later embrace of monotheism.

In his writings, Pliny the Elder refers to the natives of Osroene and Commagene as Arabs and the region as Arabia. Abgar II is called "an Arab phylarch" by Plutarch, while Abgar V is described as "king of the Arabs" by Tacitus.

The Edessene onomastic contains many Arabic names. The most common one in the ruling dynasty of Edessa being Abgar, a well-attested name among Arabic groups of antiquity. Some members of the dynasty bore Iranian names, while others had Arabic names. Judah Segal notes that the names ending in "-u" are "undoubtedly Nabatean". The Abgarid dynasts spoke "a form of Aramaic".

It was in the region in which the legend of Abgar V originated.

== In Roman sources ==
The area of the kingdom was perhaps roughly coterminous with that of the Roman province of Osrhoene. The great loop of the Euphrates was a natural frontier to the north and west. In the south Batnae was capital of the semi-autonomous principality of Anthemusias until its annexation by Rome, in AD 115. The eastern boundary is uncertain; it may have extended to Nisibis or even to Adiabene in the first century AD. Ḥarrān, however, only 40 km south of Edessa, always maintained its independent status as a Roman colonia.

Edessa, the capital of the ancient kingdom, was a fortress of considerable strength and a staging post both large and nearest to the Euphrates. It was an important road junction; an ancient highway, along which caravans carried merchandise from China and India to the West, meeting there a north–south road connecting the Armenian Highlands with Antioch. Inevitably, Edessa figured prominently on the international stage.

In 64 BC, as Pompey waged war on the Parthian Empire, Abgar II of Osrhoene had sided with the Romans when Lucius Afranius occupied Upper Mesopotamia. The king was initially an ally of the Roman general Marcus Licinius Crassus in his campaign against the Parthians in 53 BC, but Roman historians allege that he betrayed Crassus by leading him to deviate from his safe route along the river and instead into an open desert, where the troops suffered from the barrenness and thus were vulnerable to cavalry attack. Abgar is said to have met with Surenas, the Parthian general, and informed him of the Roman movements. The enormous and infamous Battle of Carrhae followed and destroyed the entire Roman army. Just prior to the battle, Abgar made a pretext to ride away. However, modern historians have questioned whether Abgar intended to betray the Romans and instead may have simply been leading them along an old Arab trade route. According to a Syriac source, Abgar died later that year.

In the early 2nd century AD, King Abgar VII joined the Emperor Trajan's campaign into Mesopotamia and entertained him at court. The king later rebelled against the Romans, however, which led to the Roman general Lucius Quietus sacking Edessa and putting an end to Osrhoene's independence in 116. In 123, during the reign of Hadrian, the Abgarid dynasty was restored with the installation of Ma'nu VII, and Osroene was established as a client kingdom of the Empire. After the Roman–Parthian War of 161–166 under Marcus Aurelius, forts were built and a Roman garrison was stationed in Nisibis. In 195, following a civil war in which Abgar VIII] had supported Pescennius Niger, the eventually victorius Septimius Severus mounted an invasion of the kingdom and possibly annexed some of its territory but allowed the Abgar VIII to retain his kingdom. In 213, Abgar IX was summoned to Rome by Caracalla, deposed and murdered, and the remaining territory incorporated into the Roman province of Osroene.

According to legends (without historical justification), by 201 AD or earlier, under King Abgar the Great, Osroene became the first Christian state. It is believed that the Gospel of Thomas emanated from Edessa around 140. Prominent early Christian figures have lived in and emerged from the region such as Tatian the Assyrian, who came to Edessa from Hadiab (Adiabene). He made a trip to Rome and returned to Edessa around 172–173. Tatian was the editor of the Diatessaron, which was the primary sacred text of Syriac-speaking Christianity until in the 5th century the bishops Rabbula and Theodoret suppressed it and substituted a revision of the Old Syriac Canonical Gospels (as in the Syriac Sinaiticus and Curetonian Gospels).

Then, Edessa was again brought under Roman control by Decius and it was made a center of Roman operations against the Sasanian Empire. Amru, possibly a descendant of Abgar, is mentioned as king in the Paikuli inscription, recording the victory of Narseh in the Sassanid civil war of 293. Historians identify that Amru as Amru ibn Adi, the fourth king of the Lakhmids, which was then still based in Harran, not yet moved to al-Hirah in southern Mesopotamia.

Many centuries later, Dagalaiphus and Secundinus duke of Osrhoene, accompanied Julian in his war against the Sasanian emperor, Shapur II, in the 4th century.

== Roman province ==
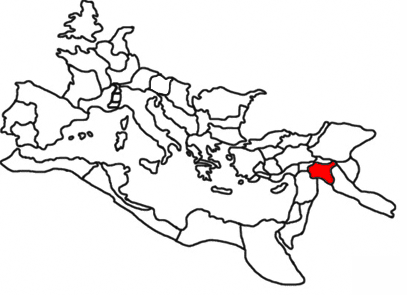
Roman province of Osroene, highlighted within the Roman Empire

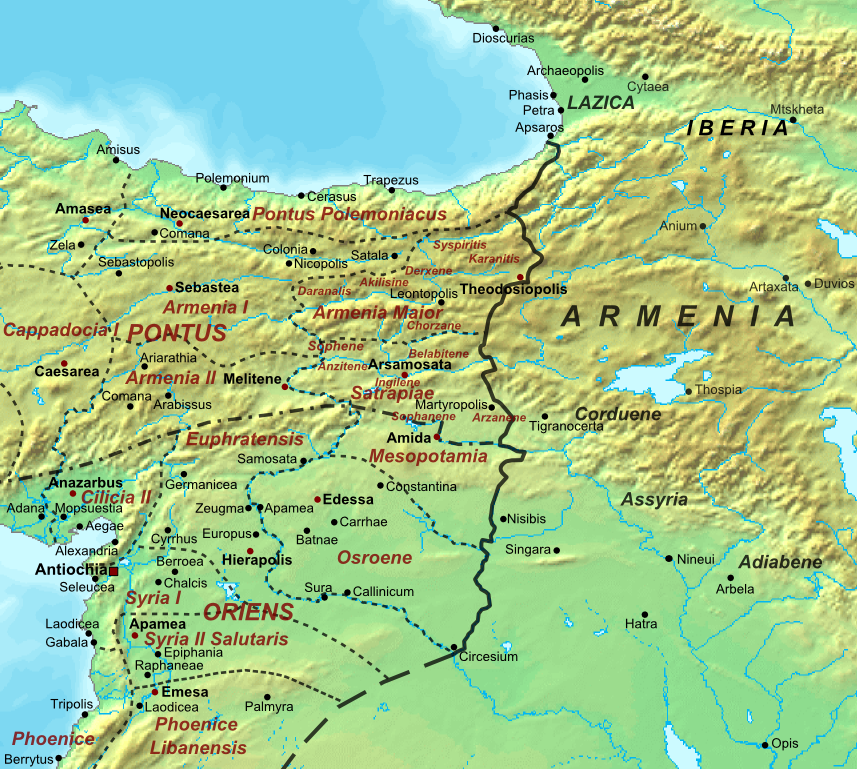
Map showing the Eastern Roman provinces, including Osroene, in the 5th century

The state of Osrhoene was considerably reduced probably during Caracalla's reign, in c. 213; large parts of the territory fell to the Roman province of Osrhoene that had been established in 195. Some scholars even think that the Osrhoenian monarchy was completely abolished in around 213. The province of Osrhoene was a frontier province, lying close to the Persian empires with which the Romans were repeatedly at war, and was taken and retaken several times. As it was on the frontier it had a Roman legion stationed there. Legio III Parthica and its Castrum (homebase) may have been Rhesaina, but that is uncertain.

Following Emperor Diocletian's tetrarchy reform during his reign (284-305), it was part of the diocese of the East, in the praetorian prefecture of the same name.

According to the late-4th-century Notitia Dignitatum, it was headed by a governor of the rank of praeses, and it was also the seat of the dux Mesopotamiae, who ranked as vir illustris and commanded (c. 400) the following army units:

- Equites Dalmatae Illyriciani, garrisoned at Ganaba.
- Equites Promoti Illyriciani, Callinicum.
- Equites Mauri Illyriciani, Dabana.
- Equites Promoti indigenae, Banasam
- Equites Promoti indigenae, Sina Iudaeorum.
- Equites Sagittarii indigenae, Oraba.
- Equites Sagittarii indigenae, Thillazamana.
- Equites Sagittarii indigenae Medianenses, Mediana.
- Equites Primi Osrhoeni, Rasin.
- Praefectus legionis quartae Parthicae, Circesium.
- (an illegible command, possibly Legio III Parthica), Apatna.

as well as, 'on the minor roll', apparently auxiliaries:

- Ala Septima Valeria Praelectorum, Thillacama.
- Ala Prima Victoriae, Tovia -contra Bintha.
- Ala Secunda Paflagonum, Thillafica.
- Ala Prima Parthorum, Resaia.
- Ala Prima nova Diocletiana, inter Thannurin et Horobam.
- Cohors Prima Gaetulorum, Thillaamana.
- Cohors Prima Eufratensis, Maratha.
- Ala Prima Salutaria, Duodecimo constituta.

According to Sozomen's Ecclesiastical History, "there were some very learned men who formerly flourished in Osroene, as for instance Bardaisan, who devised a heresy designated by his name, and his son Harmonius. It is related that this latter was deeply versed in Grecian erudition, and was the first to subdue his native tongue to meters and musical laws; these verses he delivered to the choirs" and that Arianism, a more successful heresy, met with opposition there.

== Rulers ==
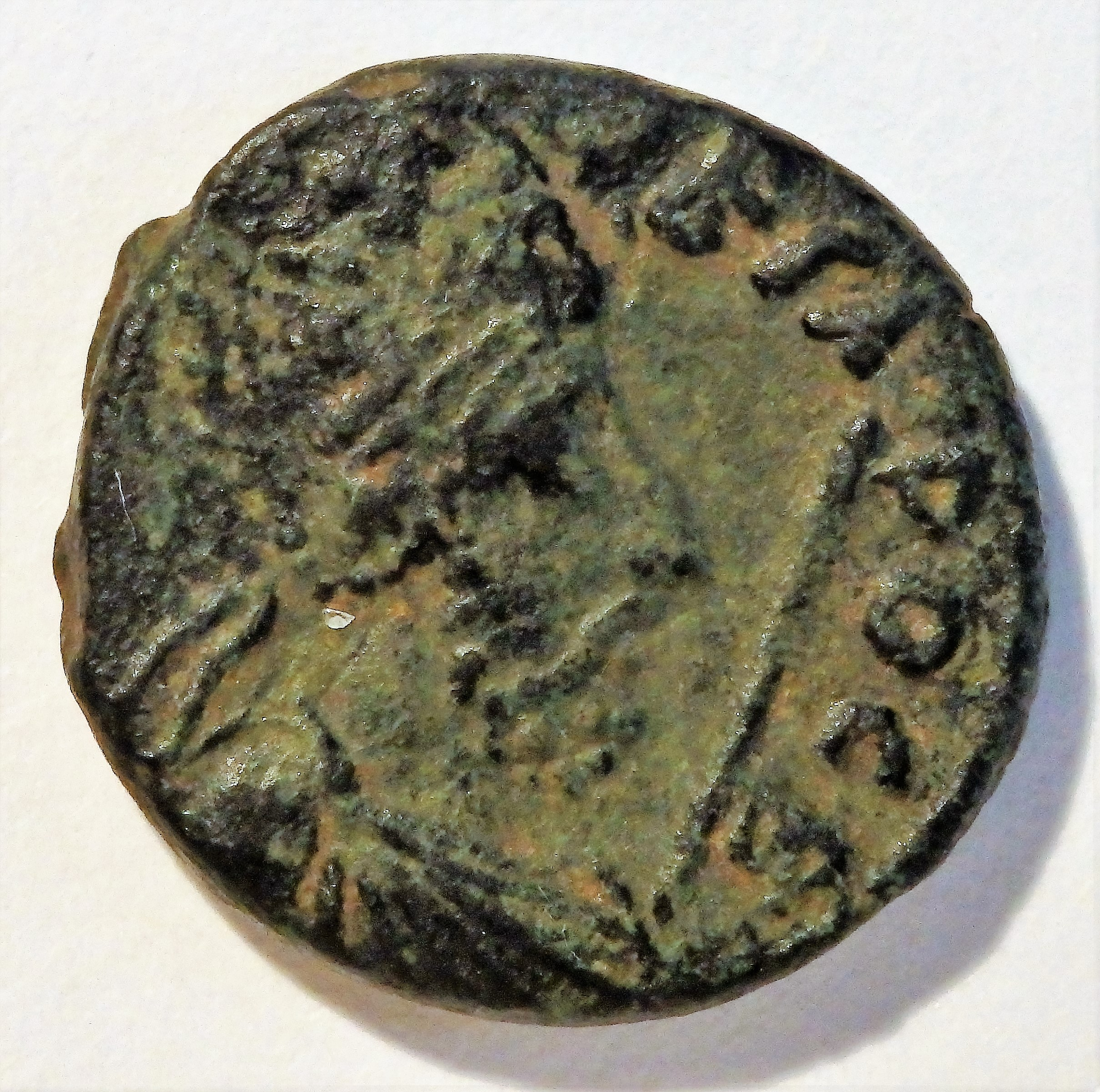
Coin of king Abgar, who ruled in Osroene during the reign of Roman emperor Septimius Severus (193-211)

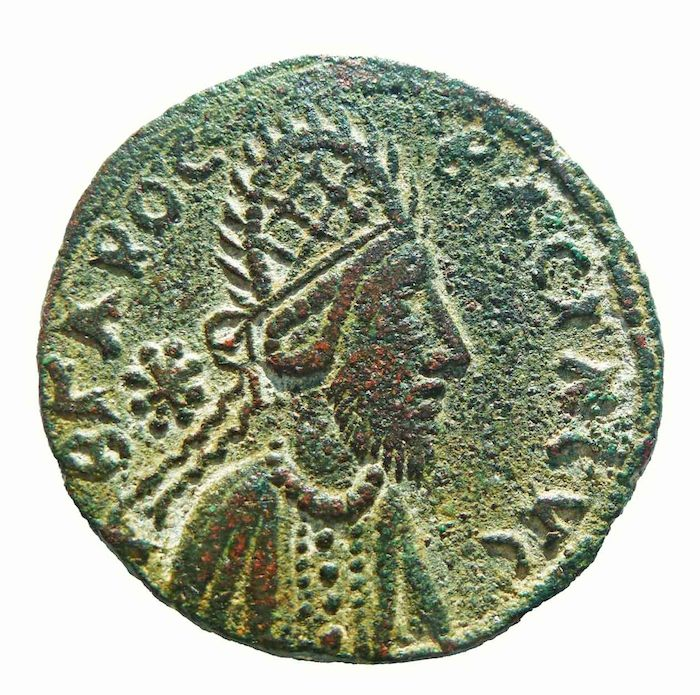
Coin of king Abgar, who ruled in Osroene during the reign of Roman emperor Gordianus III (238-244)

Kings of Edessa/Osroene
King	Reign	Comments
Aryu	132–127 BC	
Abdu, son of Maz'ur	127–120 BC	
Fradasht, son of Gebar'u	120–115 BC	
Bakru I, son of Fradasht	115–112 BC	
Bakru II, son of Bakru	112–94 BC	Ruled alone
Bakru II and Ma'nu I	94 BC	Ruled together
Bakru II and Abgar I Piqa	94–92 BC	Ruled together
Abgar I	92–68 BC	Ruled alone
Abgar II, son of Abgar I	68–53 BC	
Interregnum	53–52 BC	
Ma'nu II	52–34 BC	
Paqor	34–29 BC	
Abgar III	29–26 BC	
Abgar IV Sumaqa	26–23 BC	
Ma'nu III Saflul	23–4 BC	
Abgar V Ukkama, son of Ma'nu	4 BC–7 AD	1st tenure
Ma'nu IV, son of Ma'nu	7–13 AD	
Abgar V Ukkama	13–50 AD	2nd tenure
Ma'nu V, son of Abgar	50–57 AD	
Ma'nu VI, son of Abgar	57–71 AD	
Abgar VI, son of Ma'nu	71–91 AD	
Interregnum	91–109 AD	
Abgar VII, son of Ezad	109–116 AD	
Interregnum	116–118 AD	
Yalur (Yalud) and Parthamaspates	118–122 AD	Ruled together
Parthamaspates	122–123 AD	Ruled alone
Ma'nu VII, son of Ezad	123–139 AD	
Ma'nu VIII, son of Ma'nu	139–163 AD	First tenure
Wa'el, son of Sahru	163–165 AD	Installed by the Parthians
Ma'nu VIII, son of Ma'nu	165–177 AD	Second tenure
Abgar VIII the Great, son of Ma'nu	177–212 AD	
Abgar IX Severus, son of Abgar	212–214 AD	Deposed by the Romans; Osroene incorporated as a Roman province (colonia)
Ma'nu IX, son of Abgar (?)	214–240 AD	Maybe ruled only in name
Abgar X Frahad, son of Ma'nu	240–242 AD	Maybe ruled only in name

== See also ==
- Edessa
- Aramaic language
- Syriac language
- Syriac Christianity
- Syria (region)
- Diocese of the Orient

== Sources ==
- Andrade, Nathanael J. (2013). Syrian Identity in the Greco-Roman World. Cambridge: Cambridge University Press. ISBN 978-1-107-24456-6.
- Drijvers, Hendrik J. W. (1980). Cults and Beliefs at Edessa. Leiden: Brill. ISBN 90-04-06050-2.
- Drower, Margaret Stephana; Gray, Eric William; Sherwin-White, Susan Mary (2012). "Osroëne". In Hornblower, Simon; Spawforth, Antony; Eidinow, Esther (eds.). The Oxford Classical Dictionary (4 ed.). Oxford University Press. ISBN 978-0-19-954556-8.
- Griffith, Sidney H. (1986). "Ephraem, the Deacon of Edessa, and the Church of the Empire". Diakonia: Studies in Honor of Robert T. Meyer. Washington: CUA Press. pp. 25–52. ISBN 978-0-8132-0596-0.
- Griffith, Sidney H. (2002). "Christianity in Edessa and the Syriac-Speaking World: Mani, Bar Daysan, and Ephraem, the Struggle for Allegiance on the Aramean Frontier". Journal of the Canadian Society for Syriac Studies. 2: 5–20. doi:10.31826/jcsss-2009-020104. S2CID 212688584. Archived from the original on 2019-09-10.
- Harrak, Amir (1992). "The Ancient Name of Edessa" (PDF). Journal of Near Eastern Studies. 51 (3): 209–214. doi:10.1086/373553. S2CID 162190342. Archived from the original (PDF) on 2014-08-09.
- Healey, John F. (2007). "The Edessan Milieu and the Birth of Syriac" (PDF). Hugoye: Journal of Syriac Studies. 10 (2): 115–127.
- Healey, John F. (2014). "Aramaean Heritage". The Aramaeans in Ancient Syria. Leiden: Brill. pp. 391–402. ISBN 978-90-04-22943-3.
- Keser-Kayaalp, Elif; Drijvers, Hendrik J. W. (2018). "Edessa". The Oxford Dictionary of Late Antiquity. Vol. 1. Oxford: Oxford University Press. pp. 516–518. ISBN 978-0-19-256246-3.
- Lieu, Samuel (1997). "EDESSA". In Yarshater, Ehsan (ed.). Encyclopædia Iranica. Vol. VIII/2: Economy V–Education XX. London and New York: Routledge & Kegan Paul. pp. 174–175. ISBN 978-1-56859-051-6.
- Luther, Andreas (1999). "Die ersten Könige von Osrhoene" [The First Kings of Osrhoene]. Klio. 81: 437–454.
- Mango, Marlia M. (1991). "Osrhoene". In Kazhdan, Alexander (ed.). The Oxford Dictionary of Byzantium. Oxford University Press. ISBN 978-0-19-504652-6.
- Millar, Fergus (1967). The Roman Empire and Its Neighbours. New York: Delacorte Press. ISBN 978-0-440-01769-1.
- Millar, Fergus (1987). "Empire, Community and Culture in the Roman Near East: Greeks, Syrians, Jews and Arabs". Journal of Jewish Studies. 38 (2): 143–164. doi:10.18647/1337/JJS-1987.
- Millar, Fergus (1993). The Roman Near East, 31 BC - AD 337. Cambridge: Harvard University Press. ISBN 978-0-674-77886-3.
- Millar, Fergus (2004). Rome, the Greek World, and the East: Government, Society and Culture in the Roman Empire. Vol. 2. Chapel Hill: University of North Carolina Press. ISBN 978-0-8078-5520-1.
- Millar, Fergus (2006). A Greek Roman Empire: Power and Belief under Theodosius II (408–450). Berkeley: University of California Press. ISBN 978-0-520-25391-9.
- Millar, Fergus (2006). Rome, the Greek World, and the East: The Greek World, the Jews, and the East. Vol. 3. Chapel Hill: University of North Carolina Press. ISBN 978-0-8078-7665-7.
- Millar, Fergus (2011). "Greek and Syriac in Edessa: From Ephrem to Rabbula (CE 363-435)". Semitica et Classica. 4: 99–114. doi:10.1484/J.SEC.1.102508.
- Millar, Fergus (2012). "Greek and Syriac in Fifth-Century Edessa: The Case of Bishop Hibas". Semitica et Classica. 5: 151–165. doi:10.1484/J.SEC.1.103053.
- Mosig-Walburg, Karin (2018). "Ma'nu paṣgribā, Vater des Königs Aelius Septimius Abgar X. Ein ,king in waiting'?" [Ma'nu paṣgribā, father of King Aelius Septimius Abgar X. A 'king in waiting'?]. In Ruffing, Kai; Droß-Krüpe, Kerstin (eds.). Emas non quod opus est, sed quod necesse est. Beiträge zur Wirtschafts-, Sozial-, Rezeptions- und Wissenschaftsgeschichte der Antike. Festschrift für Hans-Joachim Drexhage zum 70. Geburtstag. Wiesbaden: Harrassowitz. pp. 371–387. ISBN 978-3-447-11087-7.
- Sartre, Maurice (2005). "The Arabs and the desert peoples". In Bowman, Alan K.; Garnsey, Peter; Cameron, Averil (eds.). The Cambridge Ancient History: Volume 12, The Crisis of Empire, AD 193-337. Cambridge University Press. ISBN 978-0-521-30199-2.
- Segal, Judah (1982). "Abgar". In Yarshater, Ehsan (ed.). Encyclopædia Iranica. Vol. I/2: ʿAbd-al-Hamīd–ʿAbd-al-Hamīd. London and New York: Routledge & Kegan Paul. pp. 210–213. ISBN 978-0-71009-091-1.
- Sommer, Michael (2018). Roms orientalische Steppengrenze. Palmyra – Edessa – Dura Europos – Hatra. Eine Kulturgeschichte von Pompeius bis Diocletian [Rome's oriental steppe frontier. Palmyra – Edessa – Dura Europos – Hatra. A cultural history from Pompey to Diocletian]. 2nd edition. Stuttgart: Franz Steiner, ISBN 978-3-515-11681-7, esp. pp. 227–271.
