= Abgar VI =

Ruler of Osroene from 71 to 91 CE

- Ruler of the kingdom of Osroene
- Reign: 71—91 CE

Abgar VI was king of Osrhoene from 71-91 CE

== See also ==
- Abgar V
- Abgar VII
