= Abgarid dynasty =

Nabataean Arab dynasty ruling Edessa and Osroene (134 BC - 242 AD)

Abgarid
- Country: Kingdom of Osroene, with the capital most of the time at Edessa
- Founded: 134 BC
- Current head: Extinct
- Final ruler: Abgar X Frahad
- Dissolution: AD 242 (?)

The Abgarid dynasty was a dynasty of Nabataean Arab origin. Members of the dynasty, the Abgarids, reigned between 134 BC and AD 242 over the city of Edessa and the Kingdom of Osroene in Upper Mesopotamia. Some members of the dynasty bore Iranian names, while others had Arabic names, including Abgar itself. J.B. Segal notes that the names ending in "-u" are "undoubtedly Nabatean". The Abgarid dynasts spoke "a form of Aramaic"; Nabataean Aramaic was a specific variety.

Following the Battle of Carrhae (53 BCE), members of the dynasty pursued a broadly pro-Parthian policy for about two centuries. At the turn of the 2nd century, the Roman Empire turned Osroene into a Roman client kingdom. During Caracalla's reign (r. 198–217), most likely in 214, Abgar IX Severus was deposed and Osroene was incorporated as a Roman colonia. Thereafter, Abgarid dynasts ruled either only in name or over a limited territory of their former kingdom.

== Kings ==
Kings of Edessa/Osroene
King	Reign	Comments
Aryu	132–127 BC	
Abdu, son of Maz'ur	127–120 BC	
Fradasht, son of Gebar'u	120–115 BC	
Bakru I, son of Fradasht	115–112 BC	
Bakru II, son of Bakru	112–94 BC	Ruled alone
Bakru II and Ma'nu I	94 BC	Ruled together
Bakru II and Abgar I Piqa	94–92 BC	Ruled together
Abgar I	92–68 BC	Ruled alone
Abgar II, son of Abgar I	68–53 BC	
Interregnum	53–52 BC	
Ma'nu II	52–34 BC	
Paqor	34–29 BC	
Abgar III	29–26 BC	
Abgar IV Sumaqa	26–23 BC	
Ma'nu III Saflul	23–4 BC	
Abgar V Ukkama, son of Ma'nu	4 BC–7 AD	1st tenure
Ma'nu IV, son of Ma'nu	7–13 AD	
Abgar V Ukkama	13–50 AD	2nd tenure
Ma'nu V, son of Abgar	50–57 AD	
Ma'nu VI, son of Abgar	57–71 AD	
Abgar VI, son of Ma'nu	71–91 AD	
Interregnum	91–109 AD	
Abgar VII, son of Ezad	109–116 AD	
Interregnum	116–118 AD	
Yalur (Yalud) and Parthamaspates	118–122 AD	Ruled together
Parthamaspates	122–123 AD	Ruled alone
Ma'nu VII, son of Ezad	123–139 AD	
Ma'nu VIII, son of Ma'nu	139–163 AD	First tenure
Wa'el, son of Sahru	163–165 AD	Installed by the Parthians
Ma'nu VIII, son of Ma'nu	165–177 AD	Second tenure
Abgar VIII the Great, son of Ma'nu	177–212 AD	
Abgar IX Severus, son of Abgar	212–214 AD	Deposed by the Romans; Osroene incorporated as a Roman province (colonia)
Ma'nu IX, son of Abgar (?)	214–240 AD	Maybe ruled only in name
Abgar X Frahad, son of Ma'nu	240–242 AD	Maybe ruled only in name

== Sources ==
- Ramelli, Ilaria L.E. (2018). "Abgarids". In Hunter, David G.; van Geest, Paul J.J.; Peerbolte, Bert Jan Lietaert (eds.). Brill Encyclopedia of Early Christianity Online.
- Mosig-Walburg, Karin (2018). "Ma'nu paṣgribā, Vater des Königs Aelius Septimius Abgar X. Ein ,king in waiting'?" [Ma'nu paṣgribā, father of King Aelius Septimius Abgar X. A 'king in waiting'?]. In Ruffing, Kai; Droß-Krüpe, Kerstin (eds.). Emas non quod opus est, sed quod necesse est. Beiträge zur Wirtschafts-, Sozial-, Rezeptions- und Wissenschaftsgeschichte der Antike. Festschrift für Hans-Joachim Drexhage zum 70. Geburtstag. Wiesbaden: Harrassowitz. pp. 371–387. ISBN 978-3-447-11087-7.
- Sartre, Maurice (2005). "The Arabs and the desert peoples". In Bowman, Alan K.; Garnsey, Peter; Cameron, Averil (eds.). The Cambridge Ancient History: Volume 12, The Crisis of Empire, AD 193-337. Cambridge University Press. ISBN 978-0521301992.
- Segal, J.B. (1982). "ABGAR". In Yarshater, Ehsan (ed.). Encyclopædia Iranica. Vol. I/2: ʿAbd-al-Hamīd–ʿAbd-al-Hamīd. London and New York: Routledge & Kegan Paul. pp. 210–213. ISBN 978-0-71009-091-1.
