= Dabana =

Dabana may refer to:

- Dabanas, an ancient fortress
- Limnonectes dabanus, a species of frog
