= Acts of Thaddeus =

Greek early Christian document (544–944 CE)

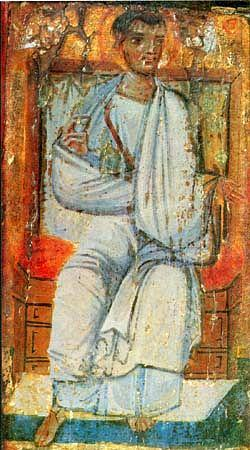
Thaddeus of Edessa. Encaustic painting at Saint Catherine's Monastery, Mount Sinai

The Acts of Thaddeus (Greek: Πραξεὶ̀ς τοῦ Θαδδαίου) is a Greek document written between 544 and 944 CE which purports to describe correspondence between King Abgar V of Edessa and Jesus, which results in Jesus' disciple Thaddeus going to Edessa.

== Authorship ==
Most scholars now believe that the Acts of Thaddeus was written in the seventh century at the earliest. Nicolotti dates it between 609 and 944 CE, when the Image of Edessa was brought to Constantinople. Palmer dates it to the seventh century, and had specifically suggested between 629 and 630, although this has been rejected by Angelo Gramaglia. Mirkovic notes that it is typically dated after the public appearance of the Image of Edessa in 544, and considers the iconoclasm controversy of the eighth century as the most probably context.

Writers frequently confuse the Greek Acts of Thaddeus with the Syriac Doctrine of Addai. (Note: For example: Moffett, S.H. (2014). A History of Christianity in Asia, Vol. I: Beginnings to 1500. Orbis Books. p. 53. ISBN 978-1-60833-162-8.; Di Genua, Andrea; Marinelli, Emanuela; Polverari, Ivan; Repice, Domenico (5 September 2014). "Judas, Thaddeus, Addai: possible connections with the vicissitudes of the Edessan and Constantinopolitan Mandylion and any research perspectives" (PDF). Translated by Monacelli, Augusto. p. 2. Academia 45620444.; McHugh, Michael P. (2013). "Acts of Thaddaeus". In Ferguson, Everett (ed.). Encyclopedia of Early Christianity (Second ed.). Taylor & Francis. p. 14. ISBN 978-1-136-61158-2.; Noegel, S.B.; Wheeler, B.M. (2010). The A to Z of Prophets in Islam and Judaism. The A to Z Guide Series. Scarecrow Press. p. 89. ISBN 978-1-4617-1895-6.; Walker, Alexander (1885). "Translator's introductory notice to the apocryphal acts of the apostles" . In Roberts, Alexander; Donaldson, James (eds.). Ante-Nicene Christian Library. Edinburgh: T. & T. Clark..)

It is generally agreed to be a later development of the tradition described in the Legend of Abgar told by Eusebius. (Note: Eusebius, I, 13; cf. II, 1, 6ff.)

== Contents ==
The Acts of Thaddeus describes correspondence between King Abgar V of Edessa and Jesus, which results in Jesus' disciple Thaddeus going to Edessa and performing miracles there including the healing of Abgar.

== Purpose ==
The Acts of Thaddeus shows significant development in the Abgar tradition since the earlier Doctrine of Addai, placing much more emphasis on the miraculous character of the Image of Edessa, while minimizing the significance of human actors.

Aquilina regards it as doctrinally orthodox and unconcerned for historical accuracy.

William Schoedel asserts that the author of the Acts of Thaddeus confused the apostle Thaddeus with a different Syrian Christian figure named Addai.

== Reception ==
The Acts of Thaddeus was included in the biblical canon of Gregory of Tatev, although no biblical manuscripts have been found which include it. Modern scholars have found it to be significant for its descriptions of the sacraments of initiation. The Acts of Thaddeus is often studied by those seeking to associate the Image of Edessa with the Shroud of Turin; Nicolotti considers their interpretations quite biased. In 2014, Stephen Andrew Missick wrote a script for a film entitled "The Acts of the Apostle Thaddeus: The Birth of Christianity in Assyria" based on the Acts of Thaddeus and other ancient sources.

== Versions ==
=== Original manuscripts ===
- Parisinus Graecus 548 (10th century, Greek)
- Vindobonensis historicus graecus 45 (11th century, Greek)

=== Published editions ===
==== Greek ====
- von Tischendorf, Constantin (1851). Acta apostolorum apocrypha. Avenarius et Mendelssohn. p. 261ff.
- Lipsius, Richard Adelbert; Bonnet, Max, eds. (1891). "Acta Thaddaei". Acta apostolorum apocrypha (in Latin and Ancient Greek). Leipzig, Germany: Herman Mendelssohn. pp. 273–283.
- Hennecke, E. (1963). Schneemelcher, W. (ed.). New Testament Apocrypha: Gospels and related writings. New Testament Apocrypha. Translated by Wilson, Robert McLachlan. Westminster Press. p. 437–444.

==== English ====
- Roberts, Alexander; Donaldson, James, eds. (1885). "Acts of the Holy Apostle Thaddaeus" . Ante-Nicene Christian Library. Translated by Walker, Alexander. Edinburgh: T. & T. Clark..

==== Other languages ====
- Moraldi, Luigi, ed. (1994) [1971]. Apocrifi del Nuovo Testamento (in Italian). Vol. II. Translated by Moraldi, Luigi (2nd ed.). Turin: Unione tipografico-editrice torinese. pp. 719–721.
- Palmer, Andrew (2005). "Actes de Thaddée". In Bovon, François; Geoltrain, Pierre; Kaestli, Jean-Daniel (eds.). Écrits apocryphes chrétiens (in French). Vol. 2. Paris: Gallimard. pp. 643–660.

== See also ==
- Abgar V § Critical scholarship
- Acts of Mar Mari
- Doctrine of Addai
- Preaching of Thaddeus
- Abgar Legend
