= Abgar II =

1st-century BC king of Osroene

Abgar II was the Abgarid king of Osroene from 68 to 53 BC. Plutarch describes Abgar as a chief of the Arabs. His name as transcribed in Arabic is أبجر ʾabjar, which means "one who has a large and prominent navel or stomach".

In 64 BC, he sided with the Romans helping Pompey's legate Lucius Afranius when the latter occupied northern Mesopotamia. However, it was alleged that in 53 BC he helped to betray Marcus Crassus by leading him out onto an open plain resulting in the Battle of Carrhae against the Parthians, which led to the destruction an entire Roman army. What is certain is that he gained no benefits from the battle since, shortly afterwards, he was deposed by Orodes II in a move which strengthened Parthian control over the region.

== Sources ==
- Gregoratti, Leonardo (2017). "The Arsacid Empire". In Daryaee, Touraj (ed.). King of the Seven Climes: A History of the Ancient Iranian World (3000 BCE - 651 CE). UCI Jordan Center for Persian Studies. pp. 1–236. ISBN 9780692864401.
- Ramelli, Ilaria L.E. (2018). "Abgarids". In Hunter, David G.; van Geest, Paul J.J.; Peerbolte, Bert Jan Lietaert (eds.). Brill Encyclopedia of Early Christianity Online. doi:10.1163/2589-7993_EECO_SIM_00000012.
- Sartre, Maurice (2005). "The Arabs and the desert peoples". In Bowman, Alan K.; Garnsey, Peter; Cameron, Averil (eds.). The Cambridge Ancient History: Volume 12, The Crisis of Empire, AD 193-337. Cambridge University Press. ISBN 978-0521301992.
- Segal, J.B. (1982). "ABGAR". Encyclopaedia Iranica, Vol. I, Fasc. 2. pp. 210–213.
