= James the Brother of Jesus (book) =

1997 book by Robert Eisenman

James the Brother of Jesus: The Key to Unlocking the Secrets of early Christianity and the Dead Sea Scrolls
- Author: Robert Eisenman
- Language: English
- Genre: Non-fiction
- Publication date: 1997

James the Brother of Jesus: The Key to Unlocking the Secrets of early Christianity and the Dead Sea Scrolls is a 1997 book by American archaeologist and Biblical scholar Robert Eisenman. He is most famous for his controversial work on the Dead Sea Scrolls and the origins of Christianity.

== Content ==
Eisenman attempts to reconstruct the events surrounding the origins of Christianity, preceding the recorded history of early Christianity. He critically reviews the narrative of the canonical gospels drawing on the Dead Sea Scrolls, the Clementine Recognitions and Homilies, the Apostolic Constitutions, Eusebius, the two James Apocalypses from Nag Hammadi, the Western Text of Acts and the Slavonic Josephus.

The central claim is that Jewish Christianity emerged from the Zadokites, a messianic, priestly, ultra-fundamentalist sect, making them indivisible from the milieu of contemporary movements like the Essenes, Zealots, Nazoreans, Nazirites, Ebionites, Elchasites, Mandaeans, etc.

In this scenario, the figure of Jesus at first did not have the central importance that it later acquired. The canonical Twelve Apostles were no more than an artificially expanded replacement for the smaller circle of brothers of Jesus. After his crucifixion one of his brothers, James the Just took his place as the leader of this party, besides other factions loyal to Jesus (Ebionites) and to John the Baptist (Mandaeans). The central triad of the early Jerusalem Church will be composed by James, Peter, and John the Apostle. According to Eisenman, James was an important religious figure in his own right.

Chronologically, the book moves the events reflected in the gospels closer to the First Jewish-Roman War than usual, identifying a Herodian named Saulus, active during the siege of Jerusalem, with Paul the Apostle (Saul), and considers the identification of Simon Peter, with Simeon bar-Cleophas.

Eisenman continues this discussion in his 2006 book The New Testament Code.

== Criticism ==
Eisenman's book has been met with strong criticism from the academic community, which has consistently rejected his theories.

John Painter, in an 11-page excursus of his book Just James (1997), has consistently refuted Eisenman's thesis. Painter accepts that James was the leader of the Jerusalem church, but concludes there is "no evidence of a direct relationship between James and the Qumran Righteous Teacher".

Another criticism of Eisenman's thesis that James is the Righteous Teacher of Qumran has been made by Philip R. Davies (1999).

Géza Vermes also criticised the thesis within the context of reviewing the book Eisenman co-authored with Michael Wise The Dead Sea Scrolls Uncovered, published in The Times Literary Supplement (1992).

New Testament scholar Bart D. Ehrman has described Eisenman's thesis as "speculative, fanciful and largely discredited".

== Editions ==
- Eisenman, Robert (1997). James the Brother of Jesus: The Key to Unlocking the Secrets of Early Christianity and the Dead Sea Scrolls. Viking. ISBN 1-84293-026-5.

== See also ==
- New Perspective on Paul
