= Ma'nu VII =

2nd century king of Edessa and Osrhoene

Ma'nu VII was king of Osrhoene from 123-139 CE. (Note: There is confusion among contemporary scholars on the rulers in this era. For details, see the article on Abgar VII.) He was the first of the Abgarid dynasty to be restored after Abgar VII supported a Parthian revolt against the Roman Emperor Trajan.
