= Edessa =

Ancient city – now Urfa or Şanlıurfa, Turkey

Coordinates: 37°9′0″N 38°46′57″E

Upper Mesopotamia and surrounding regions during the Early Christian period, with Edessa in the upper left quadrant

Edessa (/əˈdɛsə/; Ancient Greek: Ἔδεσσα, romanized: Édessa) was an ancient city (polis) in Upper Mesopotamia, in what is now Urfa or Şanlıurfa, Turkey. It was founded during the Hellenistic period by Macedonian general and self proclaimed king Seleucus I Nicator (r. 305–281 BC), founder of the Seleucid Empire. He named it after an ancient Macedonian capital. The Greek name Ἔδεσσα (Édessa) means "tower in the water". It later became capital of the Kingdom of Osroene, and continued as capital of the Roman province of Osroene. In Late Antiquity, it became a prominent center of Christian learning and seat of the Catechetical School of Edessa. During the Crusades, it was the capital of the County of Edessa.

The city was situated on the banks of the Daysan River (Ancient Greek: Σκίρτος; Latin: Scirtus; Turkish: Kara Koyun), a tributary of the Khabur, and was defended by Şanlıurfa Castle, the high central citadel.

Ancient Edessa is the predecessor of modern Urfa (Turkish: Şanlıurfa; Kurdish: Riha; Arabic: الرُّهَا, romanized: ar-Ruhā; Armenian: Ուռհա, romanized: Urha), in Şanlıurfa Province, Turkey. Modern names of the city are likely derived from Urhay or Orhay (Classical Syriac: ܐܘܪܗܝ, romanized: ʾŪrhāy / ʾŌrhāy), the site's Syriac name before the re-foundation of the settlement by Seleucus I Nicator. After the defeat of the Seleucids in the Seleucid–Parthian Wars, Edessa became capital of the Kingdom of Osroene, with a mixed Syriac and Hellenistic culture. The origin of the name of Osroene itself is probably related to Orhay.

The Roman Republic began exercising political influence over the Kingdom of Osroene and its capital Edessa from 69 BC. It became a Roman colonia in 212 or 213, though there continued to be local kings of Osroene until 243 or 248. In Late Antiquity, Edessa was an important city on the Roman–Persian frontier with the Sasanian Empire. It resisted the attack of Shapur I (r. 240–270) in his third invasion of Roman territory. The 260 Battle of Edessa saw Shapur defeat the Roman emperor Valerian (r. 253–260) and capture him alive, an unprecedented disaster for the Roman state. The Late Antique Laterculus Veronensis names Edessa as the capital of the Roman province of Osroene. The Roman soldier and Latin historian Ammianus Marcellinus described the city's formidable fortifications and how in 359 it successfully resisted the attack of Shapur II (r. 309–379).

The city was a centre of Greek and Syriac theological and philosophical thought, hosting the famed School of Edessa. Edessa remained in Roman hands until its capture by the Persians during the Byzantine–Sasanian War of 602–628, an event recorded by the Greek Chronicon Paschale as occurring in 609. Roman control was restored by the 627 and 628 victories of Heraclius (r. 610–641) in the Byzantine–Sasanian War, but the city was lost by the Romans again in 638, to the Rashidun Caliphate during the Muslim conquest of the Levant. It did not return to the Romans' control until the Byzantine Empire temporarily recovered the city in the mid-10th century after a number of failed attempts.

The Byzantine Empire regained control in 1031, though it did not remain under their rule for long and changed hands several times before the end of the century. The County of Edessa, one of the Crusader states set up after the success of the First Crusade, was centred on the city, the crusaders having seized the city from the Seljuks. The county survived until the 1144 Siege of Edessa, in which Imad al-Din Zengi, founder of the Zengid dynasty, captured the city and, according to Matthew of Edessa, killed many of the Edessenes. The Turkic Zengid dynasty's lands were eventually absorbed by the Ottoman Empire in 1517 after the 1514 Battle of Chaldiran.

== Names ==
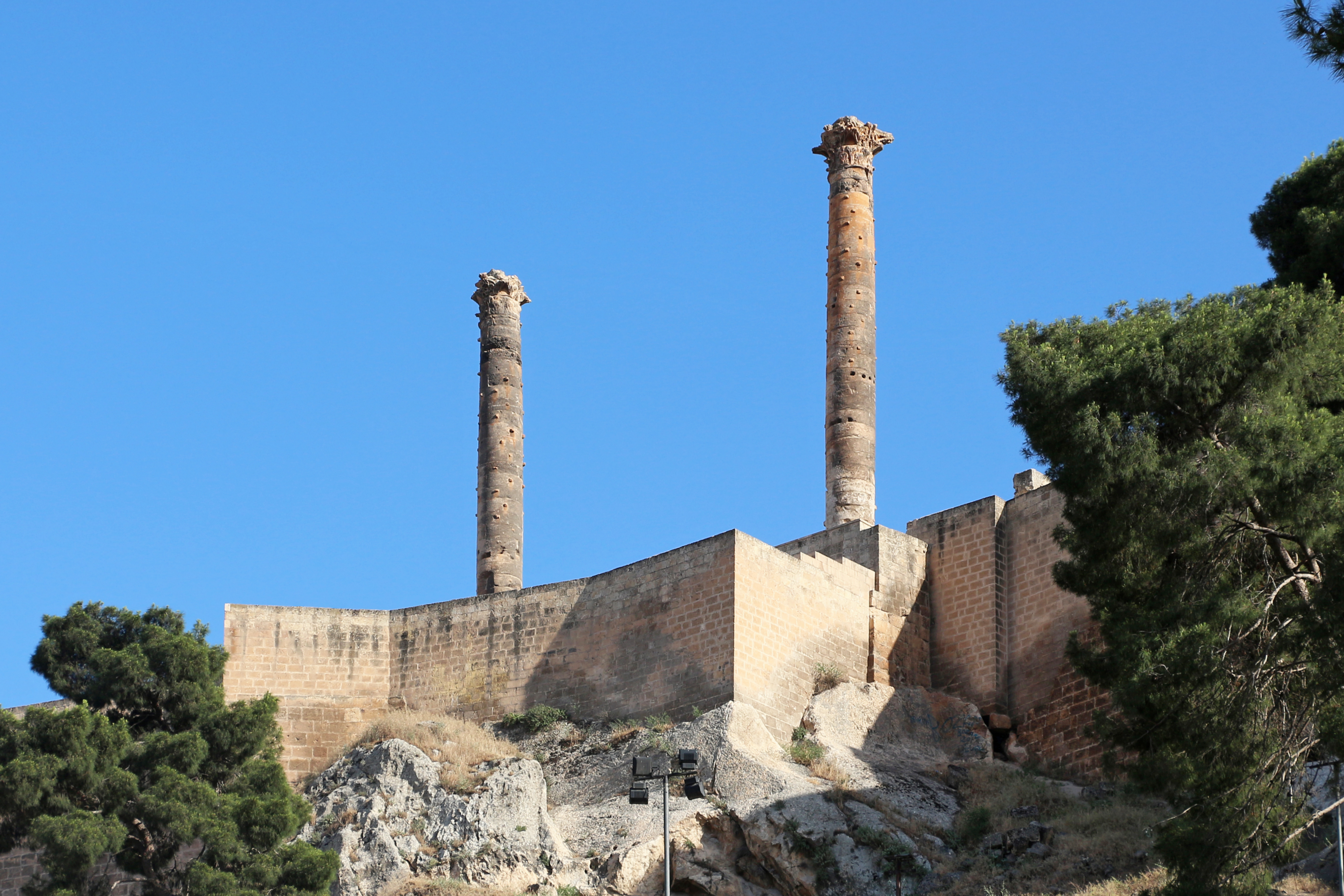
The heritage of Roman Edessa survives today in these columns at the site of Urfa Castle, dominating the skyline of the modern city of Urfa.

The earliest name of the city was Admaʾ(also written Adme, Admi, Admum; Imperial Aramaic: אדמא), recorded in Assyrian cuneiform in the Old Assyrian period. It is recorded in Syriac as ܐܕܡܐ Adme.

The ancient town was refounded as a Hellenistic military settlement by Seleucus I Nicator in c. 303 BC, and named Edessa after the ancient capital of Macedonia, perhaps due to its abundant water, just like its Macedonian namesake. It was later renamed Callirrhoe or Antiochia on the Callirhoe (Ancient Greek: Ἀντιόχεια ἡ ἐπὶ Καλλιρρόης; Latin: Antiochia ad Callirhoem) in the 2nd century BC (found on Edessan coins struck by Antiochus IV Epiphanes, r. 175–164 BC).

After Antiochus IV's reign, the name of the city reverted to Edessa, in Greek, and also appears in Armenian as Urha or Ourha (Ուռհա), in Aramaic (Syriac) as Urhay or Orhay (Classical Syriac: ܐܘܪܗܝ, romanized: ʾŪrhāy / ʾŌrhāy), in local Neo-Aramaic (Turoyo) as Urhoy, in Arabic as ar-Ruhā (الرُّهَا), in the Kurdish languages as Riha, Latinized as Rohais, and finally adopted into Turkish as Urfa or Şanlıurfa ("Glorious Urfa"), its present name. This originally Aramaic and Syriac name for the city may have been derived from the Persian name Khosrow.

It was re-named Justinopolis during the Byzantine period in the early 6th century. According to some Jewish and Muslim traditions, it is the location of Ur of the Chaldees, the birthplace of Abraham.

== Geography ==
Edessa was situated on a ridge in the middle of a ring of hills surrounded by a fertile plain, and was therefore considered to be favourably situated. The ridge in turn was an extension of Mount Masius, part of the Taurus Mountains of southern Asia Minor. The city was located at a crossroads; the east–west highway from Zeugma on the Euphrates to the Tigris, and the north–south route from Samosata (modern-day Samsat) to the Euphrates via Carrhae (modern-day Harran) met at the ridge where Edessa was located.

== History ==
=== Antiquity ===
In the second half of the second century BC, as the Seleucid Empire disintegrated during wars with Parthia (145–129 BC), Edessa became the capital of the Abgarid dynasty, who founded the kingdom of Osroene (also known as Edessa). This kingdom was established by the nabateans and lasted nearly four centuries (c. 132 BC to A.D. 214), under twenty-eight rulers, who sometimes called themselves "king" on their coinage. Edessa was at first more or less under the protectorate of the Parthians, then of Tigranes of Armenia, Edessa was Armenian Mesopotamia's capital city, then from the time of Pompey under the Roman Empire. Following its capture and sack by Trajan, the Romans even occupied Edessa from 116 to 118, although its sympathies towards the Parthians led to Lucius Verus pillaging the city later in the 2nd century.

Christianity is attested in Edessa in the 2nd century; the gnostic Bardaisan was a native of the city and a philosopher at its court. From 212 to 214 the kingdom was a Roman province.

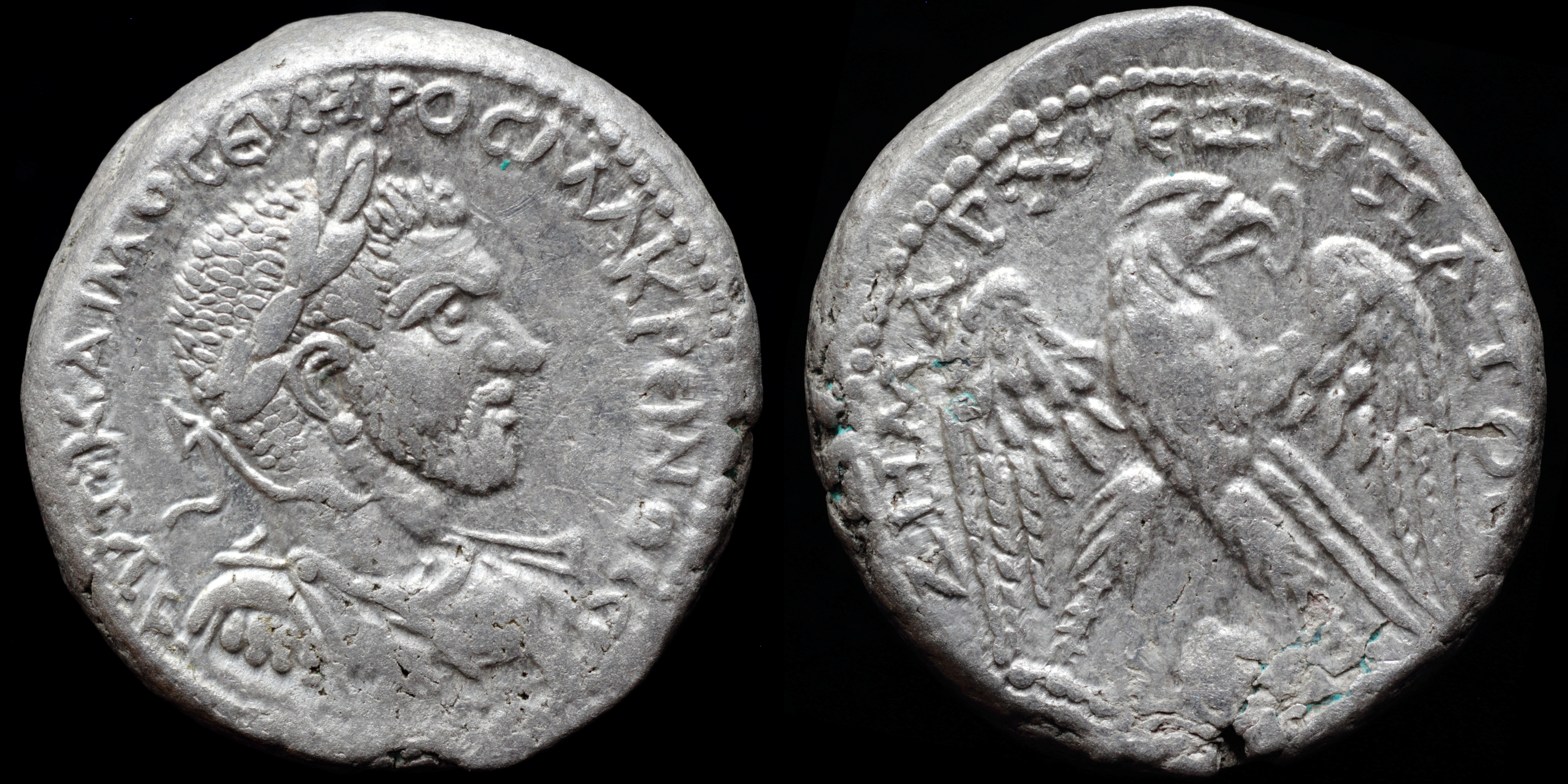
Silver tetradrachm struck in Edessa by Macrinus 217–218 AD

The Roman emperor Caracalla was assassinated on the road from Edessa to Carrhae (now Harran) by one of his guards in 217. Edessa became one of the frontier cities of the province of Osroene and lay close to the border of the Sasanian Empire. The Battle of Edessa took place between the Roman armies under the command of the emperor Valerian and the Sasanian forces under emperor Shapur I in 260. The Roman army was defeated and captured in its entirety by the Persian forces, including Valerian himself, an event which had never previously happened.

The literary language of the tribes that had founded this kingdom was Aramaic, from which Syriac developed. Traces of Hellenistic culture were soon overwhelmed in Edessa, which employed Syriac legends on coinage, with the exception of the client king Abgar IX (179–214), and there is a corresponding lack of Greek public inscriptions.

=== Late Antiquity ===
According to the Chronicle of Edessa, a Syriac chronicle written after 540, the cathedral church of Edessa was founded immediately after the end of the Diocletianic Persecution and the 313 Letter of Licinius, which ended the general persecution of Christians in the Roman Empire. The cathedral church was dedicated to the Holy Wisdom. Around 23 different monasteries and churches are known to have existed in the city, with at least as many again just outside town; these attracted many pilgrims. Eusebius of Caesarea even claimed in his Church History that "the whole city" was "devoted to the name of Christ" in the early 4th century; in fact the city had at least some pagan inhabitants into the early 5th century, as well as Jewish ones.

Eusebius also claimed to quote the Letter of Abgar to Jesus and the Letter of Jesus to Abgar in the state archives of Edessa, foundational texts of the Abgar Legend.

Egeria, a high-status Roman lady and author, visited Edessa in 384 on her way to Jerusalem; she saw a martyrium of Thomas the Apostle and the text of the Letter of Jesus inscribed on the city walls, said to protect the city. She saw a longer version of the Letters than she was previously familiar with, and was assured that the holy words had repelled a Persian assault on the city. According to the Chronicle of Edessa, in 394 the relics of Saint Thomas were translated into the great Church of St Thomas and in 442 they were encased in a silver casket. According to the late-6th-century Frankish hagiographer and bishop Gregory of Tours, the relics had themselves been brought from India, while in Edessa an annual fair (and alleviation of customs duties) was held at the church in July in the saint's honour (the feast of St Thomas was observed on 3 July) during which, Gregory alleged, water would appear in shallow wells and flies disappeared. According to Joshua the Stylite, a shrine to some martyred saints was built outside the city walls in 346 or 347.

A more elaborate version of the Abgar Legend is recorded in the early 5th-century Syriac Doctrine of Addai, purportedly based on the state archives of Edessa, and including both a pseudepigraphal letter from Abgar V to Tiberius (r. 14–37) and the emperor's supposed reply. This text is the earliest to allege that a painting (or icon) of Jesus was enclosed with the reply to Abgar and that the city of Edessa was prophesied never to fall. According to this text, Edessenes were early adopters of Christianity; the inhabitants of the neighbouring city of Carrhae (Harran), by contrast, were pagans. According to the Chronicle of Edessa, the early 5th-century theologian and bishop Rabbula built a church dedicated to Saint Stephen in a building that had been a synagogue. The city was a site of major unrest in 449 due to an attempt to depose its bishop, Ibas.

When Nisibis (Nusaybin) was ceded to the Sasanian Empire along with Arzanene, Moxoene, Zabdicene, Rehimena and Corduene in 363, Ephrem the Syrian left his native town for Edessa, where he founded the celebrated School of Edessa. This school, largely attended by the Christian youth of Persia, and closely watched by Rabbula, the friend of Cyril of Alexandria, on account of its Nestorian tendencies, reached its highest development under bishop Ibas, famous through the Three-Chapter Controversy, was temporarily closed in 457, and finally in 489, by command of Emperor Zeno and Bishop Cyrus, when the teachers and students of the School of Edessa repaired to Nisibis and became chief writers of the Church of the East. Miaphysitism prospered at Edessa after the Arab conquest.

Under the Sassanian emperor Kavad I (r. 488–531), the Sasanids attacked Edessa. According to Joshua the Stylite the shrine outside the walls set up in the 340s was burnt by his troops.

Edessa was rebuilt by Justin I (r. 518–527), and renamed Justinopolis after him. The Greek historian Procopius, in his Persian Wars, describes the inscription of the Letter of Jesus's text on the city gates of Edessa, which he stated made the defences impregnable.

An unsuccessful Sasanian siege occurred in 544. The city was taken in 609 by the Sasanian Empire, and retaken by Heraclius, but lost to the Muslim army under the Rashidun Caliphate during the Muslim conquest of the Levant in 638.

==== Early Christian centre ====
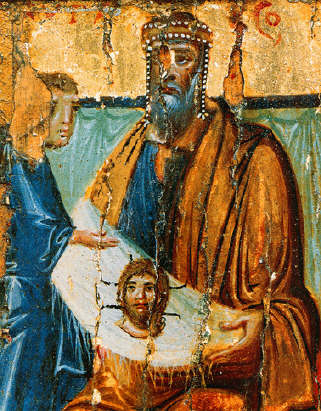
King Abgar holding the Image of Edessa.

The precise date of the introduction of Christianity into Edessa is not known. However, there is no doubt that even before AD 190 Christianity had spread vigorously within Edessa and its surroundings and that shortly after the royal house joined the church.

According to a legend first reported by Eusebius in the fourth century, King Abgar V was converted by Thaddeus of Edessa (Addai), who was one of the seventy-two disciples, sent to him by "Judas, who is also called Thomas". However, various sources confirm that the Abgar who embraced the Christian faith was Abgar IX. Under him Christianity became the official religion of the kingdom.

Addai was succeeded by Aggai, then by Saint Mari, who was ordained about 200 by Serapion of Antioch. Thence came to us in the second century the famous Peshitta, or Syriac translation of the Old Testament; also Tatian's Diatessaron, which was compiled about 172 and in common use until Rabbula, Bishop of Edessa (412–435), forbade its use. Among the illustrious disciples of the School of Edessa, Bardaisan (154–222), a schoolfellow of Abgar IX, deserves special mention for his role in creating Christian religious poetry, and whose teaching was continued by his son Harmonius and his disciples.

A Christian council was held at Edessa as early as 197. In 201 the city was devastated by a great flood, and the Christian church was destroyed. In 232 the relics of the apostle Thomas were brought from Mylapore, India, on which occasion his Syriac Acts were written. Under Roman domination many martyrs suffered at Edessa: Sharbel and Barsamya, under Decius; Sts. Gûrja, Shâmôna, Habib, and others under Diocletian. In the meanwhile Christian priests from Edessa had evangelized Eastern Mesopotamia and Persia, and established the first Churches in the Sasanian Empire. Atillâtiâ, Bishop of Edessa, assisted at the First Council of Nicaea (325). The Peregrinatio Silviae (or Etheriae) gives an account of the many sanctuaries at Edessa about 388.

As metropolis of Osroene, Edessa had eleven suffragan sees. Michel Le Quien mentions thirty-five bishops of Edessa, but his list is incomplete.

The Eastern Orthodox episcopate seems to have disappeared after the 11th century. Of its Jacobite bishops, twenty-nine are mentioned by Le Quien (II, 1429 sqq.), many others in the Revue de l'Orient chrétien (VI, 195), some in Zeitschrift der deutschen morgenländischen Gesellschaft (1899), 261 sqq. Moreover, Nestorian bishops are said to have resided at Edessa as early as the 6th century.

==== Islamic rule ====
The Armenian chronicler Sebeos, bishop of Bagratid Armenia writing in the 660s, gives the earliest narrative accounts of Islam in any language today. Sebeos writes of a Jewish delegation going to an Arab city (possibly Medina) after the Byzantines conquered Edessa:

Twelve peoples [representing] all the tribes of the Jews assembled at the city of Edessa. When they saw that the Iranian troops had departed ... Thus Heraclius, emperor of the Byzantines, gave the order to besiege it. (625) ... So they departed, taking the road through the desert to Tachkastan to the sons of Ishmael. [The Jews] called [the Arabs] to their aid and familiarized them with the relationship they had through the books of the [Old] Testament. Although [the Arabs] were convinced of their close relationship, they were unable to get a consensus from their multitude, for they were divided from each other by religion. In that period a certain one of them, a man of the sons of Ishmael named Mahmet, a merchant, became prominent. A sermon about the Way of Truth, supposedly at God's command, was revealed to them... he ordered them all to assemble together and to unite in faith... He said: "God promised that country to Abraham and to his son after him, for eternity. And what had been promised was fulfilled during that time when [God] loved Israel. Now, however, you are the sons of Abraham, and God shall fulfill the promise made to Abraham and his son on you. Only love the God of Abraham, and go and take the country which God gave to your father, Abraham. No one can successfully resist you in war, since God is with you.

Muslim tradition tells of a similar account, known as the second pledge at al-Aqabah. Sebeos' account suggests that Muhammad was actually leading a joint venture toward Palestine, instead of a Jewish-Arab alliance against the Meccan pagans toward the south.

=== Middle Ages ===
The Byzantine Empire often tried to retake Edessa, especially under Romanos I Lekapenos, who obtained from the inhabitants the "Image of Edessa", an ancient portrait of Christ, and solemnly transferred it to Constantinople, August 16, 944. This was the final great achievement of Romanus's reign. This venerable and famous image, which was certainly at Edessa in 544, and of which there is an ancient copy in the Vatican Library, was looted and brought to the West by the Republic of Venice in 1207 following the Fourth Crusade. The city was ruled shortly thereafter by Marwanids.

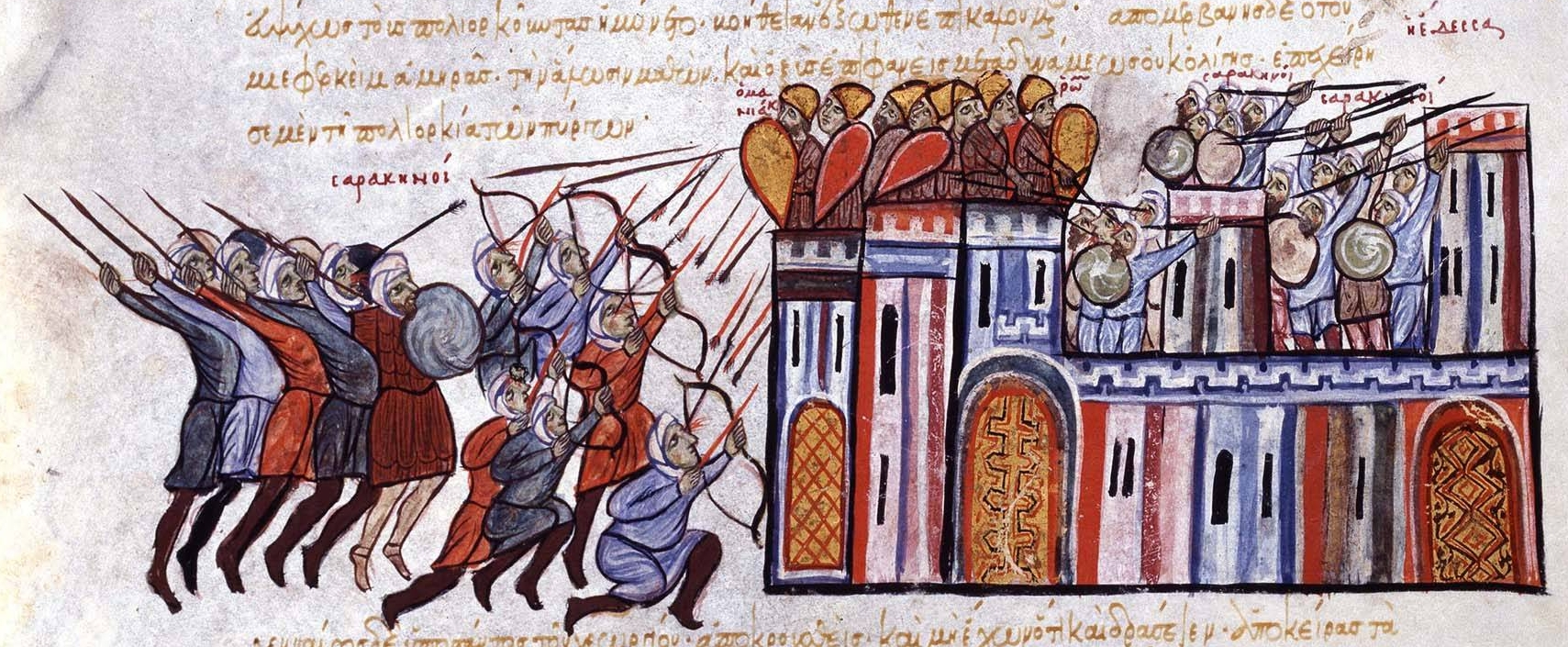
The seizure of Edessa in Syria by the Byzantine army and the Arabic counterattack (Maniakes) from the Chronicle of John Skylitzes

In 1031 Edessa was given up to the Byzantines under George Maniakes by its Arab governor. It was subsequently retaken by the Arabs, and then again by the Byzantines. Under Byzantine rule, Edessa remained an important centre for the production of textiles and was quite prosperous as indicated by the city's tax revenue, which was 50 pounds of gold per year. In the years 1071-1072, the city's population was around 35,000 residents, of whom 20,000 were Syrians, 8,000 were Armenians, 6,000 were Greeks and 1,000 were Latins.

Following the collapse of Byzantine control in Anatolia, the city would be controlled by the Seljuq dynasty (1087), an Armenian named Thoros who gained independence from the Turks (1094), and the Crusaders (1098), who established there the County of Edessa and kept the city until 1144, when it was captured and sacked by Imad ad-Din Zengi, and most of its inhabitants were allegedly slaughtered together with the Latin archbishop. These events are known to us chiefly through the Armenian historian Matthew, who had been born at Edessa. In 1144 the city had an Armenian population of 47,000. In 1146, the city was briefly recaptured by the Crusaders and lost after a few days. In the words of Steven Runciman, "the whole Christian population was driven into exile and the great city, which claimed to be the oldest Christian commonwealth in the world, was left empty and desolate, and has never recovered to this day."

The Ayyubid Sultanate's leader Saladin acquired the town from the Zengids in 1182. During Ayyubid rule, Edessa had a population of approximately 24,000. The Sultanate of Rûm took Edessa in June 1234, but sometime in late 1234 or 1235, the Ayyubid sultan Al-Kamil re-acquired it. After Edessa had been recaptured, Al-Kamil ordered the destruction of its Citadel. Not long after, the Mongols had made their presence known in Edessa in 1244. Later, the Ilkhanate sent troops to Edessa in 1260 at which point the town voluntarily submitted to them. The populace of Edessa were thus saved from being massacred by the Mongols. Edessa was also held by the Mamluk Sultanate, and the Aq Qoyunlu.

=== Subsequent history ===
Edessa was subsequently controlled by the Safavid Iran, and from 1517 to 1918 the Ottoman Empire.

Under the Ottomans in 1518, the population of Edessa was estimated at a mere 5,500; likely due to the Ottoman–Persian Wars. By 1566, though, the population had risen to an estimated 14,000 citizens. In 1890, the population of Edessa consisted of 55,000, of which the Muslim population made up 40,835.

== Syriac literature ==
The oldest known dated Syriac manuscripts (AD 411 and 462), containing Greek patristic texts, come from Edessa.

Following are some of the famous individuals connected with Edessa:

1. Jacob Baradaeus, an ardent Miaphysite who preserved the (Oriental) Orthodox church after the persecution subsequent to the Chalcedonian controversy Jacobites
2. Jacob, Bishop of Edessa, a prolific writer (d. 708);
3. Theophilus, an astronomer, who translated into Syriac verse Homer's Iliad and Odyssey;
4. Stephen Bar Sudaïli, monk and pantheist, to whom was owing, in Palestine, the last crisis of Origenism in the 6th century
5. The anonymous author of the Chronicon Edessenum (Chronicle of Edessa), compiled in 540
6. The anonymous writer of the story of "The Man of God", in the 5th century, which gave rise to the legend of St. Alexius, also known as Alexius of Rome (because exiled Eastern monks brought his cult and bones to Rome in the 10th century).
7. Basil bar Shumna (d. c. 1170) bishop who wrote a chronicle of the city's history (now lost)
8. Cyrus of Edessa, 6th century Syriac Christian writer
9. John bar Aphtonia, a key figure in the transmission of Greek thought and literary culture into a Syriac milieu
10. Thaddeus of Edessa, Christian saint and one of the seventy disciples of Jesus
11. Maurelius of Voghenza, Syrian priest

== See also ==
- List of ancient Greek cities
- Image of Edessa
- Knanaya
- List of bishops of Edessa
- Matthew of Edessa

== Sources ==
- Adai, Jacob (2005). "Edessa and the Syriac Language". The Harp. 18: 331–336. doi:10.31826/9781463233068-030. ISBN 9781463233068.
- Adler, William (2013). "The Kingdom of Edessa and the Creation of a Christian Aristocracy". Jews, Christians, and the Roman Empire: The Poetics of Power in Late Antiquity. Philadelphia: University of Pennsylvania Press. pp. 43–62, 277–282. ISBN 9780812208573.
- Barnard, Leslie W. (1968). "The Origins and Emergence of the Church in Edessa during the First Two Centuries A. D." (PDF). Vigiliae Christianae. 22 (3): 161–175. doi:10.1163/157007267X00438. S2CID 161640016. Archived from the original (PDF) on 12 February 2020.
- Bauer, Walter (1971). "Edessa". Orthodoxy and Heresy in Earliest Christianity. Archived from the original on 18 August 2000.
- Brock, Sebastian P. (2005). "The Theological Schools of Antioch, Edessa and Nisibis". Christianity: A History in the Middle East. Beirut: Middle East Council of Churches. pp. 143–160. ISBN 9789953003436.
- Brock, Sebastian P. (2009). "Edessene Syriac Inscriptions in Late Antique Syria". From Hellenism to Islam: Cultural and Linguistic Change in the Roman Near East. Cambridge: Cambridge University Press. pp. 289–302. ISBN 9780521875813.
- Brock, Sebastian P. (2013). "Manuscripts Copied in Edessa". Orientalia Christiana: Festschrift für Hubert Kaufhold zum 70. Geburtstag. Wiesbaden: Harrassowitz Verlag. pp. 109–128. ISBN 9783447068857.
- Curran, John (1998). "From Jovian to Theodosius". In Cameron, Averil; Garnsey, Peter (eds.). The Cambridge Ancient History: The Late Empire, A.D. 337-425. Vol. XIII (2nd ed.). Cambridge University Press. pp. 78–110. ISBN 0-521-30200-5.
- Drijvers, Hendrik J. W. (1980). Cults and Beliefs at Edessa. Leiden: Brill. ISBN 9004060502.
- El-Azhari, Taef (2016). Zengi and the Muslim Response to the Crusades: The Politics of Jihad. Routledge.
- Everett-Heath, John (2018). "Şanlıurfa". The Concise Dictionary of World Place-Names (4 ed.). Oxford University Press. ISBN 978-0191866326.
- Fafinski, Mateusz (2024). "A Restless City: Edessa and Urban Actors in the Syriac Acts of the Second Council of Ephesus". Al-Masaq. 37 (3): 1–25. doi:10.1080/09503110.2024.2331915.
- Farina, Margherita (2018). "La linguistique syriaque selon Jacques d'Édesse". Lesauteurs syriaques etleurlangue. Paris: Geuthner. pp. 167–187.
- Griffith, Sidney H. (1986). "Ephraem, the Deacon of Edessa, and the Church of the Empire". Diakonia: Studies in Honor of Robert T. Meyer. Washington: CUA Press. pp. 25–52. ISBN 9780813205960.
- Griffith, Sidney H. (2002). "Christianity in Edessa and the Syriac-Speaking World: Mani, Bar Daysan, and Ephraem, the Struggle for Allegiance on the Aramean Frontier". Journal of the Canadian Society for Syriac Studies. 2: 5–20. doi:10.31826/jcsss-2009-020104. S2CID 166480216. Archived from the original on 11 December 2018.
- Griffith, Sidney H. (2003). "The Doctrina Addai as a Paradigm of Christian Thought in Edessa in the Fifth Century" (PDF). Hugoye: Journal of Syriac Studies. 6 (2): 269–292. doi:10.31826/hug-2010-060111. S2CID 212688514.
- A. von Gutschmid, Untersuchungen über die Geschichte des Königliches Osroëne, in series Mémoires de l'Académie Impériale des Sciences de Saint-Pétersbourg, series 7, vol. 35.1 (St. Petersburg, 1887)
- Gray, Eric William; Kuhrt, Amélie (2012). "Edessa". The Oxford Classical Dictionary (4 ed.). Oxford University Press. ISBN 978-0-19-954556-8.
- Harrak, Amir (1992). "The Ancient Name of Edessa" (PDF). Journal of Near Eastern Studies. 51 (3): 209–214. doi:10.1086/373553. S2CID 162190342. Archived from the original (PDF) on 9 August 2014.
- Healey, John F. (2007). "The Edessan Milieu and the Birth of Syriac" (PDF). Hugoye: Journal of Syriac Studies. 10 (2): 115–127.
- Keser-Kayaalp, Elif; Drijvers, Hendrik J. W. (2018). "Edessa". The Oxford Dictionary of Late Antiquity. Vol. 1. Oxford: Oxford University Press. pp. 516–518. ISBN 9780192562463.
- Lieu, Samuel (1997). "Edessa". Encyclopaedia Iranica. Vol. 8. pp. 174–175.
- Millar, Fergus (1967). The Roman Empire and Its Neighbours. New York: Delacorte Press. ISBN 9780440017691.
- Millar, Fergus (1993). The Roman Near East, 31 BC - AD 337. Cambridge: Harvard University Press. ISBN 9780674778863.
- Millar, Fergus (2004). Rome, the Greek World, and the East: Government, Society and Culture in the Roman Empire. Vol. 2. Chapel Hill: University of North Carolina Press. ISBN 9780807855201.
- Millar, Fergus (2006). Rome, the Greek World, and the East: The Greek World, the Jews, and the East. Vol. 3. Chapel Hill: University of North Carolina Press. ISBN 9780807876657.
- Millar, Fergus (2006). A Greek Roman Empire: Power and Belief under Theodosius II (408–450). Berkeley: University of California Press. ISBN 9780520253919.
- Millar, Fergus (2011). "Greek and Syriac in Edessa: From Ephrem to Rabbula (CE 363-435)". Semitica et Classica. 4: 99–114. doi:10.1484/J.SEC.1.102508.
- Millar, Fergus (2012). "Greek and Syriac in Fifth-Century Edessa: The Case of Bishop Hibas". Semitica et Classica. 5: 151–165. doi:10.1484/J.SEC.1.103053.
- Reinink, Gerrit J. (1995). "Edessa Grew Dim and Nisibis Shone Forth: The School of Nisibis at the Transition of the Sixth-Seventh Century". Centres of Learning: Learning and Location in Pre-modern Europe and the Near East. Leiden: Brill. pp. 77–89. ISBN 9004101934.
- Ross, Steven K. (2001). Roman Edessa: Politics and Culture on the Eastern Fringes of the Roman Empire, 114-242 CE. London-New York: Routledge. ISBN 9781134660636.
- Segal, Judah B. (1970). Edessa: The Blessed City. Oxford: Clarendon Press. ISBN 9780198215455.
