= Chronicle of Edessa =

Mid-6th century Syriac history of Edessa

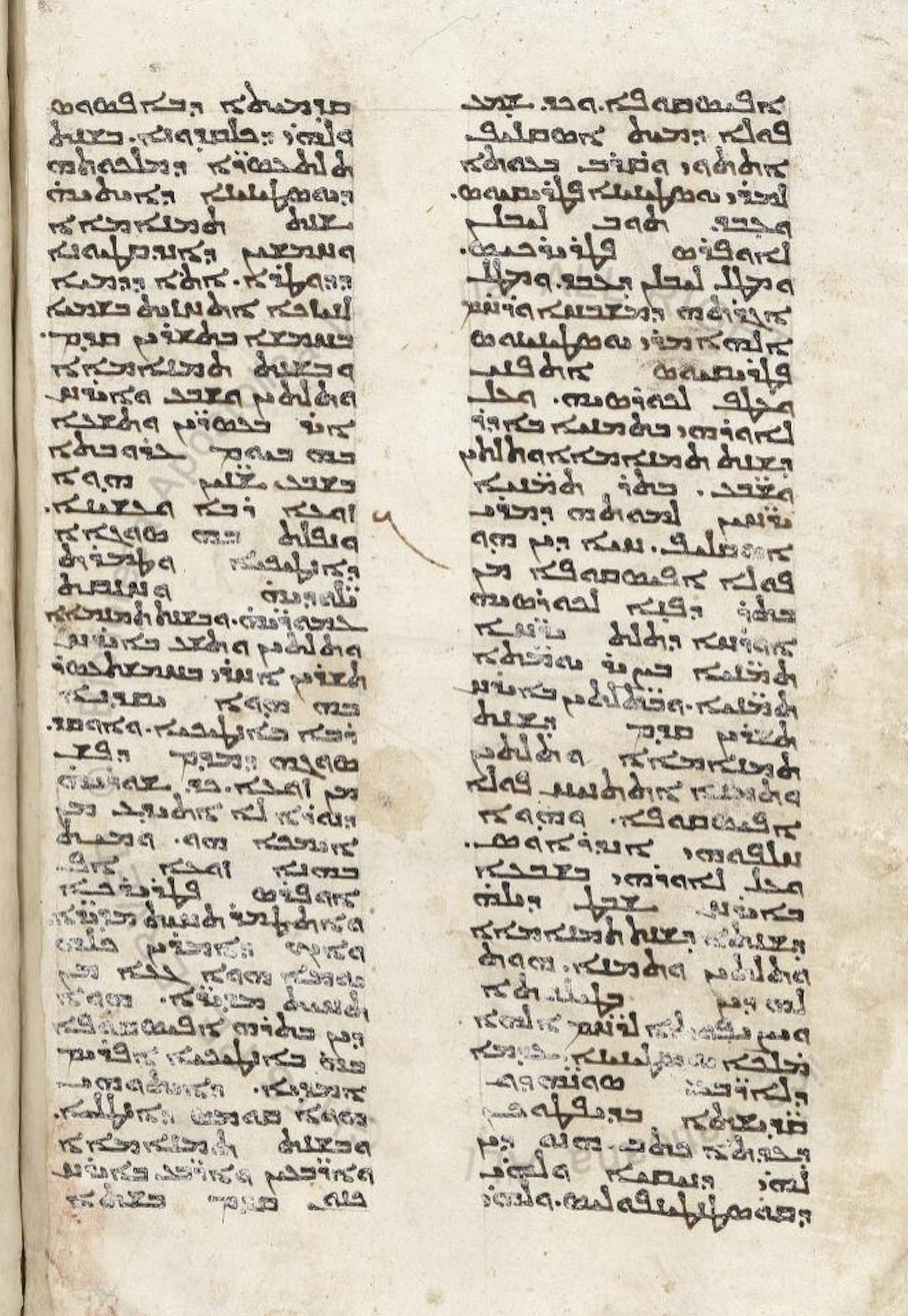
Vatican Syr. 163 folio

The Chronicle of Edessa (Latin: Chronicon Edessenum) is an anonymous history of the city of Edessa written in the mid-6th century in the Syriac language. "Chronicle of Edessa" is a conventional title; in the manuscript it is titled Histories of Events in Brief (Syriac: ܬܫ̈ܥܝܬܐ ܕܣܘܥܪ̈ܢܐ ܐܝܟ ܕܒܦܣܝ̈ܩܬܐ, Tašʿyātā d-suʿrāne a(y)k da-b-pāsiqātā). (Note: Per Griffith 1991; Witakowski 2018, p. 336, translates it as Stories of Events in Brief.)

The Chronicle of Edessa is generally agreed to have been written around 540–550 CE. (Note: Dates given are: mid-6th century (Ferguson 1999, p. 267), 540 CE (Palmer 1999, p. 421), 550 CE (Schnabel 2004, p. 899; Yamauchi 1983, p. 85). Samuel, Santiago & Thiagarajan (2008) claim without explanation that it was written in 590 CE (p. 97).) The Chronicle primarily used old Edessan royal archives as its source, as well as some more recent church records, and accordingly is thought to be historically reliable. It may make use of a lost history of Persia.

It is extant only in an abbreviated version in a single manuscript, Vatican Syriac 163 (Vat. Syr. 163). This manuscript, from the Syrian Convent of Our Lady in the Wadi El Natrun, was acquired by Giuseppe Simone Assemani during a trip to the Near East from 1715 to 1717 taken at the request of Pope Clement XI. Some excerpts of the lost full version of the text—sometimes called the Original Chronicle of Edessa—are preserved in other Syriac chronicles.

The Chronicle covers the period from the founding of the kingdom of Osrhoene in 133/132 BCE until 540, but few events are recorded before the 3rd century. The Chronicle picks up with a record of a flood of the river Daysan during the reign of Abgar VIII in November 201, which damaged a Christian church building in Edessa. This is the earliest mention of a building dedicated exclusively to Christian worship, as well as one of few records of Christianity in Edessa at this time. Unlike other Syriac literature, the Chronicle does not contain any legends of the Apostle Thaddeus.

== Published editions ==
=== Syriac ===
- "Vatican Syriac 163" (PDF). Brigham Young University. 2004.
- Guidi, Ignatius, ed. (1903). Chronica minora. Corpus scriptorum christianorum orientalium. Leipzig/Paris: Harrassowitz. pp. 1–13. Archived from the original on 6 November 2017.

=== English ===
- Cowper, Benjamin Harris (1865). "The Chronicle of Edessa". Journal of Sacred Literature and Biblical Record. 5 (9): 28–45. (Transcription by Robert Pearse)
