= Legio III Parthica =

Roman legion

- Active: 197 to sometime in the 5th century
- Country: Roman Empire
- Type: Roman legion (Marian)
- Role: Infantry assault (some cavalry support)
- Size: Varied over unit lifetime. Approx. 3,500 fighting men + support at the time of creation.
- Garrison/HQ: Resaena, Mesopotamia (197 – c. 4th century); Apatna, Osroene (5th century
- Nickname(s): Parthica, "Parthian" (since 197); Severiana, "Severus" (under Alexander Severus)
- Mascot(s): Bull
- Engagements: Septimius Severus Parthian campaign (197); Caracalla Sassanid campaign (217); Sassanid campaign of Severus Alexander (231); Battle of Resaena (243); Odaenathus Sassanid campaign (264); Diocletian Sassanid campaign (298)

Commanders
- Notable commanders: Septimius Severus (campaign); Caracalla (campaign); Alexander Severus (campaign); Odaenathus (campaign); Diocletian (campaign)

Legio III Parthica ("Parthian-conquering Third Legion") was a legion of the Imperial Roman army founded in AD 197 by the emperor Septimius Severus (r. 193–211) for his campaign against the Parthian Empire, hence the cognomen Parthica. The legion was still active in the Eastern provinces in the early 5th century. The legion's symbol was probably a bull.

== Foundation ==
Together with its sister legions I Parthica and II Parthica, the third Parthian legion was levied for the attack on the eastern frontier. The campaign was a success and Ctesiphon, the Parthian capital, was taken and sacked. III Parthica remained in the region afterwards, garrisoning the new province of Mesopotamia. Their main base camp was Rhesaena, where they had the duty of securing the main roads and protect the province against the Sassanids.

== Against the Sassanids ==
During the 3rd century, III Parthica took part in several other campaigns against the Sassanids; even if there are few direct proofs of its involvement, III Parthica was stationed in the region and was obviously employed in the wars between the two rival empires.

A first indecisive campaign was led by Emperor Caracalla in 217, during which he was assassinated.

In 230, the Sassanids invaded the Roman province, defeating the Third. The Emperor Alexander Severus then organized a successful campaign to restore Roman rule over Mesopotamia.

Emperor Gordian III organized another campaign in 243, and the Third won the Battle of Resaena, but in the following year Gordian died during the campaign, and his successor Philip the Arab, whose position had been confirmed by Shapur I, retreated. The Sassanids marked a major victory in 256, when they defeated the XV Apollinaris and conquered its fortress, Satala, sacking Trapezus in 258. Emperor Valerian tried to recover the lost territories, but was defeated and taken prisoner (260). The Romans successfully challenged the Sassanid rule, first with Odaenathus (261-267), leader of a secessionist Palmyrene Empire, and later with Emperor Diocletian (284-305), who signed a treaty of peace in 298 that marked the return of Northern Mesopotamia under Roman influence.

In the early 5th century, the legion was probably still active in the region under the Dux Osrhoenae, based in Apatna, modern Tell Fdyin, Iraq (Notitia dignitatum is corrupted, but shows that a legion is quartered in Apatna, and the III Parthica is not mentioned anywhere else).

== See also ==
- List of Roman legions
