= Abgar VII =

Ruler of the kingdom of Osroene from 109 to 116

- Ruler of the kingdom of Osroene
- Reign: 109—116 CE
- Died: c. 116

Abgar VII was king of Osroene from 109-116 CE. His primary goal was to remain independent of both the major powers in the region, the Roman and the Parthian Empires. Toward this end, he supported the Roman Emperor Trajan's military campaign into Mesopotamia against the Parthian king Osroes I in 114-116 CE, ending an era of Edessan neutrality toward the Roman Empire. However, in 116 CE, Abgar also supported a Parthian revolt against Trajan. The Roman general Lusius Quietus responded promptly by capturing and sacking Edessa. Abgar VII died at this time.

Sources do not agree on what happened after Abgar VII's death. Warwick Ball reports that Hadrian appointed Parthamaspates of Parthia as a puppet king of captured territories including Osroene in 117 CE. He also reports that the Romans reinstated the Abgar dynasty in 123 CE with the accession of Ma'nu VII. Drijvers & Healey (1999), by contrast, report that there was a span of two years following Abgar VII's death where Edessa had no king before the Abgar dynasty was reinstated by the Emperor Hadrian in 118 CE as a client kingdom of Rome.
