= Abgar V =

1st-century AD king of Osroene and 1st Christian king

Saint Abgar V of Edessa
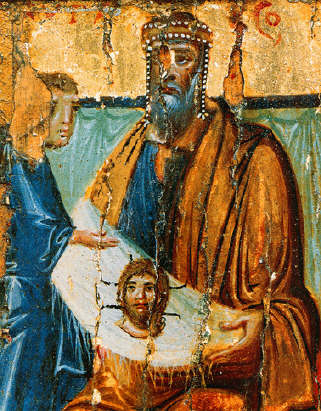
- Icon of Abgar holding the mandylion, the image of Christ (encaustic, 10th century, Saint Catherine's Monastery, Mount Sinai).
- Born: 1st century BC
- Died: c. AD 50
- Venerated in: Assyrian Church of the East; Catholic Church; Eastern Orthodox Church; Oriental Orthodox Church
- Feast: 4th Friday after Easter (Assyrian Church of the East)

Abgar V (c. 1st century BC – c. AD 50), called Ukkāmā (meaning "the Black" in Syriac and other dialects of Aramaic), (Note: Arabic: أَبْجَر ٱلْخَامِس أُوكَامَا, romanized: ʾAbǧar al-Ḫāmis ʾŪkāmā, Syriac: ܐܒܓܪ ܚܡܝܫܝܐ ܐܘܟܡܐ, romanized: ʾAḇgar Ḥmīšāyā ʾUkkāmā, Armenian: Աբգար Ե Եդեսացի, romanized: Abgar Hingerord Yedesatsi, Ancient Greek: Ἄβγαρος, Latin: Abgarus.) was a King of Osroene with his capital at Edessa and a possible early convert to Christianity.

According to a popular Christian tradition attested as early as Eusebius and also found in the Doctrine of Addai, Abgar wrote a letter to Jesus asking him to visit Edessa and heal him. Jesus was said to have replied with a letter promising to send an apostle, while some versions of the tradition add that he also sent Abgar a portrait of himself. In the 4th century, Egeria recorded that Jesus' letter was preserved at Edessa, and copies of it were used as talismans.

== Background ==
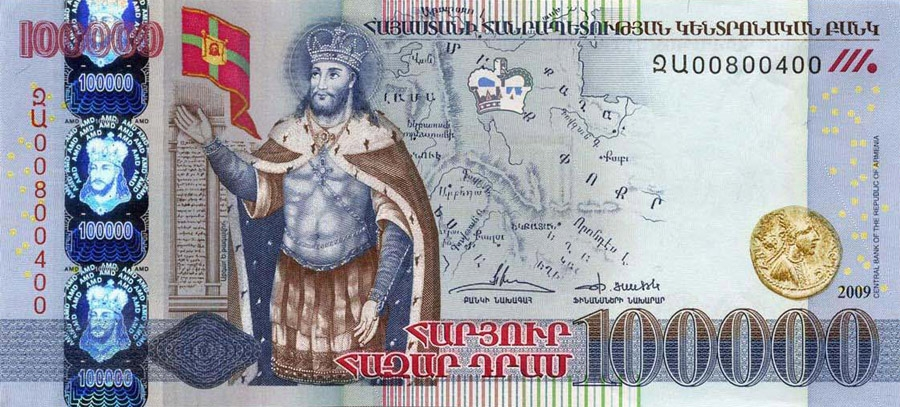
Abgar V on an Armenian banknote

Abgar was described as "king of the Arabs" by the Roman historian Tacitus, a near-contemporary source. The 5th-century (or later) Armenian historian Movses Khorenatsi depicted Abgar as an Armenian, but modern scholarly consensus agree that the Abgarids were in fact an Arab dynasty.

Moses of Chorene notes that Abgar V's chief wife was Queen Helena of Adiabene, but according to the contemporary Jewish historian Josephus she was the wife of King Monobaz I of Adiabene.

== Letter of Abgar to Jesus ==
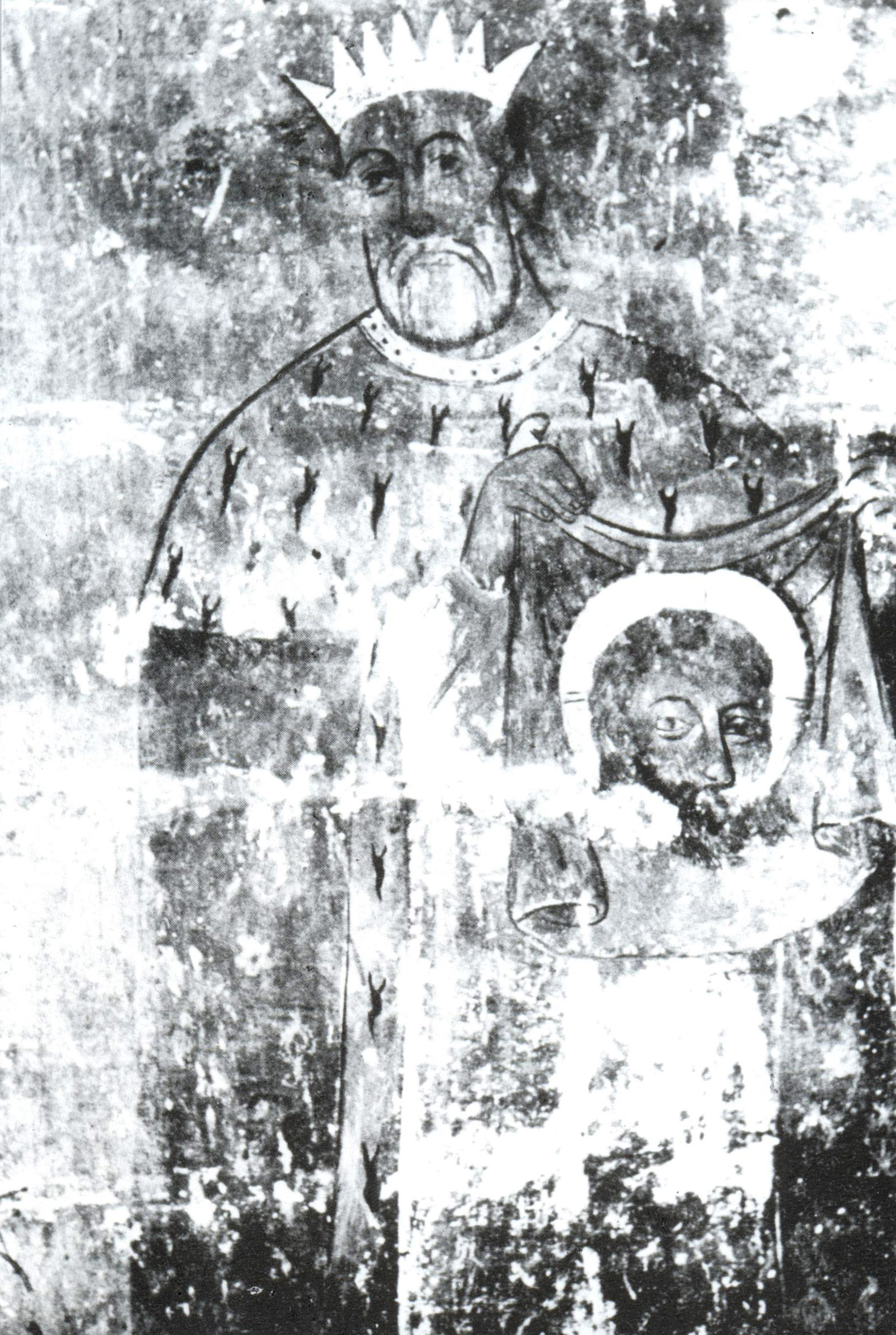
Fresco from Varaga St. Gevorg church chapel showing king Abgar with image of Christ

Abgar V is said to be one of the first Christian kings, having been converted to the faith by Thaddeus of Edessa, one of the seventy disciples.

The church historian Eusebius recorded that the Edessan archives contained a copy of a correspondence exchanged between Abgar of Edessa and Jesus. The correspondence consisted of Abgar's letter and the answer dictated by Jesus. On 15 August 944, the Church of St. Mary of Blachernae in Constantinople received the letter and the Mandylion. Both relics were then moved to the Church of the Virgin of the Pharos.

This account enjoyed great popularity in the East and in the West during the Middle Ages. Jesus' letter was copied on parchment, inscribed in marble and metal, and used as a talisman or an amulet. Of this correspondence, there survives not only a Syriac text, but an Armenian translation as well, two independent Greek versions, shorter than the Syriac, and several inscriptions on stone.

Scholars have disputed many aspects of this account such as whether Abgar suffered from gout or from leprosy, or whether the correspondence was on parchment or papyrus.

The text of the letter was:

Abgar, ruler of Edessa, to Jesus the good physician who has appeared in the country of Jerusalem, greeting. I have heard the reports of you and of your cures as performed by you without medicines or herbs. For it is said that you make the blind to see and the lame to walk, that you cleanse lepers and cast out impure spirits and demons, and that you heal those afflicted with lingering disease, and raise the dead. And having heard all these things concerning you, I have concluded that one of two things must be true: either you are God, and, having come down from heaven, you do these things, or else you, who does these things, are the son of God. I have therefore written to you to ask you if you would take the trouble to come to me and heal all the ill which I suffer. For I have heard that the Jews are murmuring against you and are plotting to injure you. But I have a very small yet noble city which is great enough for us both.

Jesus gave the messenger the reply to return to Abgar:

Blessed are you who hast believed in me without having seen me. For it is written concerning me, that they who have seen me will not believe in me, and that they who have not seen me will believe and be saved. But in regard to what you have written me, that I should come to you, it is necessary for me to fulfill all things here for which I have been sent, and after I have fulfilled them, thus to be taken up again to him that sent me. But after I have been taken up, I will send to you one of my disciples, that he may heal your disease and give life to you and yours.

Egeria wrote of the letter in her account of her pilgrimage in Edessa. She read the letter during her stay around 384, and remarked that the copy in Edessa was "fuller" than the copies in her home (which was likely Gaul).

In addition to the importance it attained in the apocryphal cycle, the correspondence of King Abgar also gained a place in liturgy for some time. The Syriac liturgies commemorate the correspondence of Abgar during Lent. The Celtic liturgy appears to have attached importance to it; the Liber Hymnorum, a manuscript preserved at Trinity College, Dublin (E. 4, 2), gives two collects on the lines of the letter to Abgar. It is even possible that this letter, followed by various prayers, may have formed a minor liturgical office in some Catholic churches.

This event has played an important part in the self-definition of several Eastern churches. Abgar is counted as saint, with feasts on 11 May and 28 October in the Eastern Orthodox Church, Thursday of the Third Week of Lent (Mid-Lent) in the Syriac Orthodox Church, and daily in the Mass of the Armenian Apostolic Church.

=== Critical scholarship ===
A number of contemporary scholars have suggested origins of the tradition of Abgar's conversion apart from historical record. Walter Bauer argued the legend was written without sources to reinforce group cohesiveness, orthodoxy, and apostolic succession against heretical schismatics. However, several distinct sources, known to have not been in contact with one another, claimed to have seen the letters in the archives, so his claim is suspect.

Significant advances in scholarship on the topic have been made including Desreumaux's translation with commentary, M. Illert's collection of textual witnesses to the legend, and detailed studies of the ideology of the sources by Brock, Griffith and Mirkovic. The majority of scholars now claim the goal of the authors and editors of texts regarding the conversion of Abgar were not so much concerned with historical reconstruction of the Christianisation of Edessa as the relationships between church and state power, based on the political and ecclesiological ideas of Ephraem the Syrian. However, the origins of the story are still far from certain, although the stories as recorded seem to have been shaped by the controversies of the third century CE, especially as a response to Bardaisan.

== Letters of Abgar to Tiberius ==
Supposed letters exchanged by Abgar V and the Roman emperor Tiberius (r. 14–37) are quoted in the Teaching of Addai (4th–5th century), the History of Armenia of the Armenian historian Movses Khorenatsi (5th century or later; date disputed), and in abbreviated form in a Syriac Transitus Mariae. Historian Ilaria Ramelli argues for the possible historicity of this exchange. Ramelli cites the 10th-century the Byzantine Narratio attributed to Constantine VII, which attests to the friendship between Abgar and the prefect of Egypt, probably A. Avillius Flaccus, who was one of Tiberius' closest friends and, in her view, "probably helped the good relationship between Abgar and Tiberius that is evident in their correspondence."

In Khorenatsi's history, Abgar's initial letter to Tiberius reads:

Abgar, king of Armenia, to my Lord Tiberius, emperor of the Romans, greeting:— I know that nothing is unknown to your Majesty, but, as your friend, I would make you better acquainted with the facts by writing. The Jews who dwell in the cantons of Palestine have crucified Jesus: Jesus without sin, Jesus after so many acts of kindness, so many wonders and miracles wrought for their good, even to the raising of the dead. Be assured that these are not the effects of the power of a simple mortal, but of God. During the time that they were crucifying Him, the sun was darkened, the earth was moved, shaken; Jesus Himself, three days afterwards, rose from the dead and appeared to many. Now, everywhere, His name alone, invoked by His disciples, produces the greatest miracles: what has happened to myself is the most evident proof of it. Your august Majesty knows henceforth what ought to be done in future with respect to the Jewish nation, which has committed this crime; your Majesty knows whether a command should not be published through the whole universe to worship Christ as the true God. Safety and health.

Tiberius' reply reads:

Tiberius, emperor of the Romans, to Abgar, king of the Armenians, greeting:— Your kind letter has been read to me, and I wish that thanks should be given to you from me. Though we had already heard several persons relate these facts, Pilate has officially informed us of the miracles of Jesus. He has certified to us that after His resurrection from the dead He was acknowledged by many to be God. Therefore I myself also wished to do what you propose; but, as it is the custom of the Romans not to admit a god merely by the command of the sovereign, but only when the admission has been discussed and examined in full senate, I proposed the affair to the senate, and they rejected it with contempt, doubtless because it had not been considered by them first. But we have commanded all those whom Jesus suits, to receive him among the gods. We have threatened with death any one who shall speak evil of the Christians. As to the Jewish nation which has dared to crucify Jesus, who, as I hear, far from deserving the cross and death, was worthy of honour, worthy of the adoration of men — when I am free from the war with rebellious Spain, I will examine into the matter, and will treat the Jews as they deserve.

== See also ==
- Doctrine of Addai
- Aretas IV
- Philip the Arab

== Sources ==
- Bauer, Walter (1971). Orthodoxy and Heresy in Earliest Christianity. Philadelphia, PA: Fortress Press. Archived from the original on 18 August 2000. (German original published in 1934)
- Camplani, Alberto (2009). "Traditions of Christian foundation in Edessa: Between myth and history". Studi e materiali di storia delle religioni. 75 (1): 251–278.
- Chapman, Henry Palmer (1913). "Doctrine of Addai" . In Herbermann, Charles (ed.). Catholic Encyclopedia. New York: Robert Appleton Company.
- Eisenman, Robert (1992), "The sociology of MMT and the conversions of King Agbarus and Queen Helen of Adiabene" (PDF), Paper presented at SBL conference
- Eisenman, Robert (1997). "Judas the brother of James and the conversion of King Agbar". James the Brother of Jesus.
- Holweck, F. G. (1924). A biographical dictionary of the saints. St. Louis, MO: B. Herder Book Co.
- Mirkovic, Alexander (2004). Prelude to Constantine: The Abgar tradition in early Christianity. Arbeiten zur Religion und Geschichte des Urchristentums. Frankfurt am Main: Peter Lang.
- von Tischendorf, Constantin. "Acta Thaddei (Acts of Thaddeus)". Acta apostolorum apocr. p. 261ff.
- Wilson, Ian (1991). Holy faces, secret places. ISBN 9780385261050.
