= Apocalypse of James =

Apocalypse of James may refer to:

- First Apocalypse of James
- Second Apocalypse of James
- Apocalypse of James (Syriac)
