= Abgar IX =

King of Osroene from 212 to 213

Abgar IX Severus was king of Osroene.

Abgar succeeded his father, Abgar VIII in 212. In 213 Abgar IX and his son were summoned to Rome and murdered at the orders of emperor Caracalla. (Note: "Abgar the Great was succeeded by Abgar IX, surnamed Severus to pander to the current Romanising climate. It did him little good, for he was summoned with his son to Rome in 213 and murdered at Caracalla’s orders.") With the capture of the king, Caracalla annexed large parts of the kingdom to the already existing Roman province of Osrhoene. Whether the kingdom of Osrhoene continued to exist as a rump state in the following decades is a matter of debate.

== Sources ==
- Ball, Warwick (2000). Rome in the east: The Transformation of an empire. Routledge. ISBN 0-415-11376-8.
- Mosig-Walburg, Karin (2018). "Ma'nu paṣgribā, Vater des Königs Aelius Septimius Abgar X. Ein ,king in waiting'?" [Ma'nu paṣgribā, father of King Aelius Septimius Abgar X. A 'king in waiting'?]. In Ruffing, Kai; Droß-Krüpe, Kerstin (eds.). Emas non quod opus est, sed quod necesse est. Beiträge zur Wirtschafts-, Sozial-, Rezeptions- und Wissenschaftsgeschichte der Antike. Festschrift für Hans-Joachim Drexhage zum 70. Geburtstag. Wiesbaden: Harrassowitz. pp. 371–387. ISBN 978-3-447-11087-7.
- Ross, S.K. (2000). Roman Edessa: Politics and Culture on the Eastern Fringes of the Roman Empire, 114 - 242 C.E. Taylor & Francis. ISBN 978-1-134-66063-6.
