= Dabanas =

Fortress in Turkey

Coordinates: 38°21′45″N 40°12′39″E

Dabanas (Ancient Greek: Δαβανάς) was a fortress in Osroene, inhabited during Roman and Byzantine times. It is mentioned by Procopius and was used by the emperor Justinian I.

The remains of the fortress are located near the village of Döğer, in the Dicle district of Diyarbakır Province, in present-day Turkey.
