= Warwick Ball =

Australian archaeologist (born 1951)

Warwick Ball is an Australia-born Near-Eastern archaeologist.

Ball has been involved in excavations, architectural studies and monumental restorations in Jordan, Iran, Iraq, Syria, Ethiopia and Afghanistan. As a lecturer, he has been involved with travel tours in Jordan, Iran, Syria, Crimea, Israel, Uzbekistan and Yemen.

Ball was formerly director of excavations at The British School of Archaeology in Iraq. He is the editor of the scholarly journal Afghanistan. His publications include Syria: A Historical and Architectural Guide (Melisende, 1997, revised 2006) and the volume The Monuments of Afghanistan, History, Archaeology and Architecture (I.B. Tauris, London 2008) which consists of photography of numerous rare archaeological sites no longer well accessible today for reasons of security.

He resides in Scotland.

== Select publications ==
- Archaeological Gazetteer of Afghanistan (Oxford University Press, 1982, revised 2019)
- Syria: A Historical and Architectural Guide (Interlink Publishing, 1997, revised 2006)
- Rome in the East: The Transformation of an Empire (Routledge, 1999, revised 2016)
- The Monuments of Afghanistan, History, Archaeology and Architecture (I.B. Tauris, 2008)
- Out of Arabia: Phoenicians, Arabs, and the Discovery of Europe (Interlink Publishing, 2009)
- Towards One World: Ancient Persia and the West (Interlink Publishing, 2010)
- Sultans of Rome: The Turkish World Expansion (Interlink Publishing, 2012)
- The Eurasian Steppe: People, Movement, Ideas (Edinburgh University Press, 2021)
- Ancient Civilizations of Afghanistan: From the Earliest Times to the Mongol Conquest (Reaktion Books, 2025)
