= Rhesaina =

Ancient Roman city, now Ra's al-'Ayn

- Location within Syria
- 36.8503°N 40.0706°E
- Cultures: Roman
- Location: Syria
- Region: Al-Hasakah Governorate

Site notes
- Condition: Ruins
- Public access: Yes

Rhesaina (Rhesaena) (Ancient Greek: Ρέσαινα and Ρεσαίνα) or Resina (Ῥέσινα) was a city in the late Roman province of Mesopotamia Secunda and a bishopric that was a suffragan of Dara.

Rhesaina (Rhesaena, Resaena – numerous variations of the name appear in ancient authors) was an important town at the northern extremity of Mesopotamia, near the sources of the Chaboras (now the Khabur River). It was on the way from Carrhae to Nicephorium, about eighty miles from Nisibis and forty from Dara. Nearby, Gordian III fought the Persians in 243, at the battle of Resaena. It is now Ra's al-'Ayn, Syria.

Its coins show that it was a Roman colony from the time of Septimius Severus. The Notitia Dignitatum (ed. Boecking, I, 400) represents it as under the jurisdiction of the governor or dux of Osroene. Hierocles (Synecdemus, 714, 3) also locates it in this province but under the name of Theodosiopolis (Θεοδοσιούπολις); it had obtained the favour of Theodosius the Great and taken his name. It was fortified by Justinian. In 1393, it was nearly destroyed by Tamerlane's troops.

== Bishops ==
Rhesaina was also the site of a bishopric. The Diocese of Rhesaina is today a suppressed and titular see of the Roman Catholic Church in the episcopal province of Mesopotamia.

Le Quien mentions nine bishops of Rhesaena:

=== Roman bishops ===
- Antiochus, present at the First Council of Nicaea (325);
- Eunomius, who (about 420) forced the Persians to raise the siege of the town;
- John, at the Council of Antioch (444);
- Olympius, at the Council of Chalcedon (451);
- Andrew (about 490);
- Peter, exiled with Sevenian (518);
- Ascholius, his successor, a Monophysite;
- Daniel (550);
- Sebastianus (about 600), a correspondent of Gregory the Great.

=== Middle Ages ===
The see is again mentioned in the 10th century in a Greek Notitia episcopatuum of the Patriarchate of Antioch (Vailhé, in "Échos d'Orient", X, 94). Le Quien (ibid., 1329 and 1513) mentions two Jacobite bishops: Scalita, author of a hymn and of homilies, and Theodosius (1035). About a dozen others are known.

=== Titular bishops ===
- Joseph-Louis Coudé (15 Jan 1782, Appointed – 8 Jan 1785)
- Alexander MacDonell (12 Jan 1819, Appointed – 27 Jan)
- Antonio Maria de J. Campos Moreno (19 Dec 1834 – 12 Jan 1851)
- Francis McNeirny (22 Dec 1871 – 12 Oct 1877)
- Tommaso Bichi (16 Dec 1880 – 1901)
- Domenico Scopelliti (15 Dec 1919 – 16 Apr 1922)
- Vicente Huarte y San Martín (26 Apr 1922 – 23 Aug 1935)
- Joseph Gjonali (Gionali) (30 Oct 1935 – 20 Dec 1952)
- Gerardo Valencia Cano, (24 Mar 1953 – 21 Jan 1972)
