= Fergus Millar =

British classical historian (1935–2019)

Sir Fergus Millar FBA FSA
- Born: Fergus Graham Burtholme Millar; 5 July 1935; Edinburgh, United Kingdom
- Died: 15 July 2019 (aged 84)
- Other name: F. G. B. Millar
- Education: Trinity College, Oxford; All Souls College, Oxford
- Occupation: Professor of ancient history
- Spouse: Susanna Friedmann (m. 1959)

Sir Fergus Graham Burtholme Millar, FBA, FSA (/ˈmɪlər/; 5 July 1935 – 15 July 2019) was a British ancient historian and academic. He was Camden Professor of Ancient History at the University of Oxford between 1984 and 2002. He is among the most influential ancient historians of the 20th century.

== Early life ==
Millar was educated at Trinity College, Oxford (BA) and fulfilled his National service in the aftermath of World War II. At Oxford he studied Philosophy and Ancient History, and received his Doctor of Philosophy (DPhil) degree there in 1962. In 1958, he was awarded a Prize Fellowship to All Souls College, Oxford, which he held until 1964. In 1959 he married Susanna Friedmann, with whom he had three children.

== Academic career ==
Millar began his academic career as a fellow of Queen's College, Oxford, from 1964 to 1976. He then moved to University College London where he was Professor of Ancient History between 1976 and 1984. From 1984 until his retirement in 2002, he was Camden Professor of Ancient History at the University of Oxford. While Camden Professor, he was a fellow of Brasenose College, Oxford.

Millar served as editor of the Journal of Roman Studies from 1975 to 1979, and as president of the Classical Association for 1992/1993. He held various offices in the British Academy, to which he was elected a fellow in 1976. He was chairman of the Council for Academic Autonomy (see also Anthony D. Smith), a group of academic activists who sought to promote academic freedom and the separation of universities and research institutions from state control.

He was an authority in the field of ancient Roman and Greek history. His accolades included honorary doctorates from the University of Helsinki, and the Hebrew University of Jerusalem and elected memberships in foreign academies. His first book, A Study of Cassius Dio (1964), set the tone for his prolific scholarly production. He continued to produce important works, including The Roman Near East (31 BC – 337 AD) (1993), a path-breaking, non-Romano-centric treatment of this area. His further work included The Crowd in the Late Republic (1998) and The Roman Republic in Political Thought (2002).

== Honours ==
Millar received the Kenyon Medal for Classics from the British Academy in 2005. He was knighted in the 2010 Queen's Birthday Honours.

In 1976, Millar was elected a Fellow of the British Academy (FBA), the United Kingdom's national academy for the humanities and social sciences. He was elected a Fellow of the Society of Antiquaries of London (FSA) in 1978.

== Publications ==
- Millar, Fergus (1964). A Study of Cassius Dio. Oxford: Clarendon Press. ISBN 978-0-19-814336-9.
- Millar, Fergus (1967). The Roman Empire and Its Neighbours. New York: Delacorte Press. ISBN 9780440017691.
- Millar, Fergus (1971). "Paul of Samosata, Zenobia and Aurelian: The Church, Local Culture and Political Allegiance in Third-Century Syria". Journal of Roman Studies. 61: 1–17. doi:10.2307/300003. JSTOR 300003.
- Millar, Fergus (1977). The Emperor in the Roman World (31 BC – AD 337). London: Duckworth. ISBN 9780715609514.
- Millar, Fergus (1983). "The Phoenician Cities: A Case-study of Hellenisation". Proceedings of the Cambridge Philological Society. 29 (209): 55–71. doi:10.1017/S0068673500004508. JSTOR 44696895.
- Millar, Fergus; Segal, Erich, eds. (1984). Caesar Augustus: Seven Aspects. Oxford: Oxford University Press. ISBN 9780198148586.
- Millar, Fergus (1987). "The Problem of Hellenistic Syria". Hellenism in the East: The Interaction of Greek and non Greek Civilizations from Syria to Central Asia after Alexander. Los Angeles: University of California Press. pp. 110–133. ISBN 9780715621257.
- Millar, Fergus (1987). "Empire, Community and Culture in the Roman Near East: Greeks, Syrians, Jews and Arabs". Journal of Jewish Studies. 38 (2): 143–164. doi:10.18647/1337/JJS-1987.
- Millar, Fergus (1993). The Roman Near East, 31 BC – AD 337. Cambridge: Harvard University Press. ISBN 9780674778863.
- Millar, Fergus (1998). The Crowd in Rome in the Late Republic. Ann Arbor: University of Michigan Press. ISBN 0472088785.
- Millar, Fergus (1998). "Ethnic Identity in the Roman Near East, 325–450: Language, Religion, and Culture". Mediterranean Archaeology. 11: 159–176. JSTOR 24667868.
- Millar, Fergus (2002). The Roman Republic in Political Thought. Hanover: University Press of New England. ISBN 9781584651994.
- Millar, Fergus (2002). Rome, the Greek World, and the East: The Roman Republic and the Augustan Revolution. Vol. 1. Chapel Hill: University of North Carolina Press. ISBN 9780807875087.
- Millar, Fergus (2004). Rome, the Greek World, and the East: Government, Society and Culture in the Roman Empire. Vol. 2. Chapel Hill: University of North Carolina Press. ISBN 9780807855201.
- Millar, Fergus (2004). "Christian Emperors, Christian Church and the Jews of the Diaspora in the Greek East, CE 379–450". Journal of Jewish Studies. 55 (1): 1–24. doi:10.18647/2519/JJS-2004.
- Millar, Fergus (2006). A Greek Roman Empire: Power and Belief under Theodosius II (408–450). Berkeley: University of California Press. ISBN 9780520253919.
- Millar, Fergus (2006). Rome, the Greek World, and the East: The Greek World, the Jews, and the East. Vol. 3. Chapel Hill: University of North Carolina Press. ISBN 9780807876657.
- Millar, Fergus (2007). "Theodoret of Cyrrhus: A Syrian in Greek Dress?". From Rome to Constantinople: Studies in Honour of Averil Cameron. Leuven: Peeters Publishers. pp. 105–125. ISBN 9789042919716.
- Millar, Fergus (2008). "Community, Religion and Language in the Middle-Euphrates Zone in Late Antiquity". Scripta Classica Israelica. 27: 67–93.
- Millar, Fergus (2008). "Rome, Constantinople and the Near Eastern Church under Justinian: Two Synods of C.E. 536". Journal of Roman Studies. 98: 62–82. doi:10.3815/007543508786239102. JSTOR 20430666.
- Millar, Fergus (2008). "Narrative and Identity in Mosaics from the Late Roman Near East: Pagan, Jewish, and Christian". The Sculptural Environment of the Roman Near East: Reflections on Culture, Ideology, and Power. Leuven: Peeters Publishers. pp. 225–256. ISBN 9789042920040.
- Millar, Fergus (2009). "The Syriac Acts of the Second Council of Ephesus (449)". Chalcedon in Context: Church Councils 400–700. Liverpool: Liverpool University Press. pp. 45–69. ISBN 9781846316487.
- Millar, Fergus (2009). "Linguistic Co-existence in Constantinople: Greek and Latin (and Syriac) in the Acts of the Synod of 536 C.E.". Journal of Roman Studies. 99: 92–103. doi:10.3815/007543509789745287. JSTOR 40599741.
- Millar, Fergus (2009). "Christian Monasticism in Roman Arabia at the Birth of Mahomet". Semitica et Classica. 2: 97–115. doi:10.1484/J.SEC.1.100512.
- Millar, Fergus (2010). "Rome's Arab Allies in Late Antiquity: Conceptions and Representations from within the Frontiers of the Empire". Commutatio et Contentio: Studies in the Late Roman, Sasanian, and Early Islamic Near East. Düsseldorf: Wellem Verlag. pp. 199–226. ISBN 9783941820036.
- Millar, Fergus (2010). "Bishops and their Sees at the Sixth Session of the Council of Chalkedon: the Near Eastern Provinces". Onomatologos: Studies in Greek Personal Names Presented to Elaine Matthews. Oxford: Oxbow Books. pp. 568–577. ISBN 978-1-84217-982-6.
- Millar, Fergus (2011). "A Rural Jewish Community in Late Roman Mesopotamia, and the Question of a Split Jewish Diaspora". Journal for the Study of Judaism. 42 (3): 351–374. doi:10.1163/157006311X586269.
- Millar, Fergus (2011). "Greek and Syriac in Edessa: From Ephrem to Rabbula (CE 363–435)". Semitica et Classica. 4: 99–114. doi:10.1484/J.SEC.1.102508.
- Millar, Fergus (2012). "Greek and Syriac in Fifth-Century Edessa: The Case of Bishop Hibas". Semitica et Classica. 5: 151–165. doi:10.1484/J.SEC.1.103053.
- Millar, Fergus (2013). Religion, Language and Community in the Roman Near East: Constantine to Muhammad. Oxford: Oxford University Press. ISBN 9780197265574.
- Millar, Fergus (2013). "The Evolution of the Syrian Orthodox Church in the Pre-Islamic Period: From Greek to Syriac?" (PDF). Journal of Early Christian Studies. 21 (1): 43–92. doi:10.1353/earl.2013.0002. S2CID 170436440.
- Millar, Fergus (2013). "A Syriac Codex from Near Palmyra and the Ghassanid Abokarib" (PDF). Hugoye: Journal of Syriac Studies. 16 (1): 15–35. doi:10.31826/hug-2014-160103.
- Millar, Fergus (2014). "The Image of a Christian Monk in Northern Syria: Symeon Stylites the Younger". Being Christian in Late Antiquity. Oxford: Oxford University Press. pp. 278–295. ISBN 9780199656035.
- Millar, Fergus (2015). Empire, Church and Society in the Late Roman Near East: Greeks, Jews, Syrians and Saracens. Leuven: Peeters Publishers. ISBN 9789042932913.

== See also ==
- Cassius Dio

== Notes ==
Academic offices
Preceded by Peter Brunt	Camden Professor of Ancient History, Oxford University; 1984–2002	Succeeded by Alan Bowman
