= Judah Segal =

British linguist (1912–2003)

Judah Benzion "Ben" Segal, FBA (21 June 1912 – 23 October 2003, Edgware, Middlesex) was Professor of Semitic Languages at the School of Oriental and African Studies.

His father was Professor Moshe Zvi Segal and his brother was the doctor and Labour Party politician Samuel Segal. He had two daughters; one is Prof. Naomi Segal.

== Education ==
- Magdalen College School, Oxford
- St. Catharine's College, Cambridge. Jarrett Scholar, 1932; John Stewart of Rannoch Scholar in Hebrew, 1933; 1st Class Oriental Langs Tripos, 1935; Tyrwhitt Scholar and Mason Prizeman, 1936. BA (Cambridge), 1935, MA 1938; DPhil (Oxford) 1939.
- Colours, Cambridge University Boxing Club, 1935, 1936.

== Career ==
- Mansel Research Exhibitioner, St. John's College, Oxford, 1936–39; James Mew Scholar, 1937.
- Deputy Assistant Director, Public Security, Sudan Government, 1939–41
- Served in World War II, GHQ, MEF, 1942–44, Captain; Education Officer, British Military Administration, Tripolitania, 1945–46. He was awarded a Military Cross in 1942.
- School of Oriental and African Studies from 1946; Head of Department of Near and Middle East, 1961–68; Professor 1961–79, then Emeritus Professor; Honorary Fellow 1983.
- Visiting Lecturer, Ain Shams University, Cairo, 1979
- Research Fellow, Hebrew University, Jerusalem, 1980
- Leverhulme Emeritus Fellowship, South India, 1981

== Involvement in Jewish community ==
- Principal, Leo Baeck College, 1982–85; President, 1985-2003
- Member, Council of Christians and Jews
- President: North Western Reform Synagogue
- President: British Association for Jewish Studies, 1980
- Vice-president, Reform Synagogues of Great Britain, 1985–91

== Honours ==
- Fellow of the British Academy, 1968
- Freedom, City of Urfa, Turkey, 1973

== Publications ==
- The Diacritical Point and the Accents in Syriac, 1953
- The Hebrew Passover, 1963
- The Sabian Mysteries. The planet cult of ancient Harran, Vanished Civilizations, 1963
- Edessa, 'the blessed city', 1970
- Aramaic Texts From North Saqqara, 1983
- A History of the Jews of Cochin, 1993
- Aramaic and Mandaic Incantation Bowls in the British Museum, 2000
- Whisper Awhile, 2000
- Articles in learned periodicals.
