= Aggai =

Aggai may refer to:

- Aggai, a village near Shashamane, Ethiopia
- Aggai, an alternative transliteration of Ai (Bible), a city, or two cities with the same name, in ancient Israel
- Saint Aggai, the second Bishop of Edessa, Mesopotamia
- Haggai, a saint and minor prophet

Aggai may also refer to:

- Aggai Khel, a clan of the Tarkani Pashtun tribe
- The Aggai River, in Sefrou Prefecture, Morocco

== See also ==
- Agai (disambiguation)
- Agaie, a historical state in present-day Nigeria
- Agey, a commune in Côte-d'Or, Bourgogne, France
- Agga (disambiguation)
- Aggay, a barangay (district) of Bantay, Ilocos Sur, Philippines
- Agge (disambiguation)
- Aggey (disambiguation)
- Aggi (disambiguation)
- Aghai, an Irish pentagraph
- Agi (disambiguation)
