= Agii =

Agii or AGII may refer to:

- Ag(II), the chemical element silver with an oxidation state of +2
- Ag-II, the propeptide of the antigen found in acquired Von Willebrand disease
- AGII, a type of plant mosaic potyvirus
- Agility II, a certificate of a dog's ability at dog agility sports, standardised by the United Kennel Club
- Angiotensin II, a hormone
- a transliteration of Greek 'Άγιοι' (Agioi), meaning 'saints'

== See also ==
- Agai (disambiguation)
- Agaie Emirate, a historical state in present-day Nigeria
- Agey, a commune in Côte-d'Or, Bourgogne, France
- AGG (disambiguation)
- Aggai (disambiguation)
- Agge (disambiguation)
- Aggey (disambiguation)
- Aggi (disambiguation)
- Aggie (disambiguation)
- Aggy (disambiguation)
- Agi (disambiguation)
- Agy, a commune in the Basse-Normandie région of France
