= Aggie =

Aggie may refer to:

== People ==
- J. C. Agajanian (1913–1984), American motor sports personality
- Aggie Beynon, Canadian metalsmith
- Aggie Grey (1897–1988), Samoan hotelier born Agnes Genevieve Swann
- Agnes Aggie Herring (1876–1939), American actress
- Adolph Aggie Kukulowicz (1933–2008), Canadian ice hockey player
- Agnes Aggie MacKenzie (born 1955), Scottish presenter of How Clean is Your House?, a British television show
- Forest Sale (1911–1985), American college basketball player and politician
- Agness Underwood (1902–1984), American journalist and newspaper editor
- Agnes Weston (1840–1918), English philanthropist
- Mary Aggie, an early 18th century slave in colonial Virginia whose trial resulted in a change to the law

== Arts and entertainment ==
=== Fictional characters ===
- Agatha "Aggie" Prenderghast, from ParaNorman, a 2012 American animated comedy horror film
- Aggie, from Nanny McPhee, a 2005 British children's film
- Aggie, from Summer of '42, a 1971 American movie that was adapted into a book and a Broadway musical
- Aggie, from Itty Bitty Titty Committee, a 2007 comedy drama directed by Jamie Babbit
- Aunt Aggie, from Angela's Ashes, a 1996 Irish-American book and 1999 film
- Aasgard Agnette "Aggie" Anderson, the title character of the British television programme The Adventures of Aggie (1956-1957)
- Splendora Agatha "Aggie" Cromwell, from the Halloweentown series of Disney television movies
- Sister Agnes, or "Aggie", one of the two main characters in the 1978 American television series In the Beginning
- Big Aggie, a Nac Mac Feegle from the Discworld fantasy book series
- Aggie James, from the novel Nocturnal by Scott Sigler
- Aggie Jones, on the American soap opera The Bold and the Beautiful
- Aggie McDonald, from Johnny Belinda, a 1940 American play that was adapted into a 1948 film and a 1967 film
- The title character of Aggie Mack, a comic strip created in 1946 by Hal Rasmusson
- Aggie Wilcox, from the Ministry is Murder novel series by American author Emilie Richards
- The title character of the 1950s British television sitcom The Adventures of Aggie

=== Other uses in arts and entertainment ===
- Aggie (film), a 2020 documentary film
- Aggie (marble), a type of marble
- Aggie, US name of the 1950s British television sitcom The Adventures of Aggie
- "Aggie", an episode of the US television series Baretta
- Aggie, later title of the comic strip Aggie Mack
- Aggie Awards, the awards presented each year by Adventure Gamers to the most relevant titles in the adventure genre

== Places ==
- Aggie, Alberta, a locality in Canada
- Aggie Creek, Fairbanks, Alaska
- Aggie Creek, Utah County, Utah
- Aggie Mount, in Bimberi Nature Reserve, Australian Capital Territory, Australia

== School nicknames, sports teams or mascots ==
=== United States ===
- University of California, Davis; see UC Davis Aggies
- University of Connecticut, until 1933
- Colorado State University, Fort Collins, Colorado
- Mississippi State University, until 1932
- Michigan State University, until 1924
- University of Massachusetts Amherst, until 1931
- New Mexico State University; see New Mexico State Aggies
- North Carolina Agricultural and Technical State University; see North Carolina A&T Aggies
  - Aggie (mascot), official mascot of North Carolina Agricultural and Technical State University
- Cameron University, Oklahoma
- Oklahoma Panhandle State University; see Oklahoma Panhandle State Aggies
- Delaware Valley University, Pennsylvania
- Texas A&M University, College Station, Texas; see Texas A&M Aggies
- Utah State University, Logan, Utah; see Utah State Aggies
- Albertville High School, Albertville, Alabama
- Sylacauga High School, Sylacauga, Alabama
- Hamilton High School (Hamilton, Alabama)
- Essex Agricultural and Technical High School, Massachusetts
- Forrest County Agricultural High School, Mississippi
- Norfolk County Agricultural High School, Walpole, Massachusetts

=== Elsewhere ===
- University of Manitoba, Canada
- Ontario Agricultural College, University of Guelph, Ontario, Canada
- College of Agriculture, Xavier University – Ateneo de Cagayan, Philippines

== Sports facilities ==
- Aggie Field, a soccer stadium on the campus of the University of California, Davis
- Aggie Stadium (disambiguation)

== Other uses ==
- , HMS Agamemnon, a battleship in the Royal Navy launched in 1906, nicknamed "Aggie"
- Cyclone Aggie, an Australian cyclone

== See also ==
- Agaie, a historical state in present-day Nigeria
- Agey, a commune in Côte-d'Or, Bourgogne, France
- AGG (disambiguation)
- Agge (disambiguation)
- Saint Aggei, Wycliffe's spelling of Mar Aggai, the second Bishop of Edessa, Mesopotamia
- Aggey (disambiguation)
- Aggi (disambiguation)
- Aggy (disambiguation)
- Aghi, a frazione of Foligno, Italy
- Agi (disambiguation)
- Agii (disambiguation)
- Agy, a commune in the Basse-Normandie région of France
