= Aggy =

Aggy may be a diminutive form of the given names Agnetha, Agamemnon, Agata, Agatha, Agnes or Aigerim. It may also be a diminutive form of a family name that begins with 'Ag-'. See also Aggie. Aggy may refer to being agitated, an abbreviation word made my Blasted.

Aggy may refer to:

== People ==
- Aggy, a character from 19th century historical novel The Pioneers
- Aggy, a character from 2005 children's movie Nanny McPhee
- Aggy Hobbs, 'privileged slave' and mistress of Armistead Burwell; mother of Elizabeth Keckly, White House seamstress
- Aggy Read, Australian croquet champion and film director associated with Ubu Films
- Agyness Deyn, English model
- Gabriel Agbonlahor, a footballer for Aston Villa and England

== Places ==
- Aggy Ridge, formally known as Aonach Eagach, a ridge in the Scottish highlands
- Ogof Agen Allwedd, a Welsh cave system

== Other uses ==
- Aggy, slang for "aggressive", "agitated", or "aggravating"
- The Aggy, a hairstyle designed by Sam McKnight for model Agyness Deyn
- Yandina Airport (ICAO code AGGY)

== See also ==
- Agey, a commune in Côte-d'Or, Bourgogne, France
- AGG (disambiguation)
- Agge (disambiguation)
- Saint Aggei, Wycliffe's spelling of Mar Aggai, the second Bishop of Edessa, Mesopotamia
- Aggey (disambiguation)
- Aggi (disambiguation)
- Aggie (disambiguation)
- Agi (disambiguation)
- Agii (disambiguation)
- Agy, a commune in the Basse-Normandie région of France
