= Agga =

Agga and other capitalizations may refer to:

== Arts and media ==
- Agga, a character in Timewyrm: Genesys, a Doctor Who novel
- Aunt Agga, an agony aunt persona used by Lillian Too, a feng shui expert
- Agga Olsen, European actress whose best known work is Smilla's Sense of Snow, a 1997 film
- Spaceship Agga Ruter, a 1998 hentai film series directed by Masaki Kajishima

== Science and technology ==
=== Biology ===
- aggA, a gene locus found in plant-associated bacteria that agglutinate; see agglutination (biology)
- Agalinis gattingeri, the roundstem false foxglove plant (USDA code: AGGA)
- AGGA, a common DNA sequence

=== Other uses in science and technology ===
- Silver gallium (AgGa), an ion that forms many compounds, some of which are used in lasers

== Burmese society ==
Agga means 'chief' or 'foremost' in Burmese, and may refer to:

- Agga Maha Thiri Thudhamma (Grand Commander) of the Thiri Thudhamma Thingaha (Order of Truth)
- Agga Maha Thray Sithu (Grand Commander) of the Pyidaungsu Sithu Thingaha (Order of the Union of Burma)
- Agga Maha Thray Sithu Agga Maha Thiri Thudhamma, also known as Sao Shwe Thaik, first president of the Union of Burma

== Other uses ==
- Agga, variant spelling of Aga of Kish, a king of Kish
- Auki Gwaunaru'u Airport (ICAO: AGGA), in the Solomon Islands

== See also ==
- Aga (disambiguation)
- Agadoo doo doo, a nonsense lyric from 1984 novelty song Agadoo
- Agar, a gelatinous substance used in confectionery and microbiology
- AGG (disambiguation)
- AGGAGG, the Shine-Dalgarno sequence of DNA base pairs. AGGAGGA is the Escherichia coli Shine-Dalgarno sequence
- Aggar (disambiguation)
- Aggas (disambiguation)
- Agge (disambiguation)
- Agger (disambiguation)
- Agha (disambiguation)
