= Agai =

Agai may refer to:

- Prince Agai of Konda, a sixteenth-century noble of Yugra
- Dillenia pentagyna, a species of tree, and a medicinal extract from that tree (Indian name: Agai)
- Agrostis airoides, a species of grass (USDA code: AGAI)
- American Gastroenterological Association Institute

Agai means 'trout' in the language of Northern Paiute Native Americans, and may also refer to:

- The Agai-Ticutta, a tribe of Northern Paiute Native Americans
- Agai Hoop, the Agai-Ticutta name for the Walker River, Nevada
- Agai Pah, the Agai-Ticutta name for Walker Lake (Nevada)
- Agai Pah Hills, a mountain range in Mineral County, Nevada

== See also ==
- Aga (disambiguation)
- Agaie, a historical state in present-day Nigeria
- AGAIG, an acronym for 'As Good As It Gets'
- Agey, a commune in Côte-d'Or, Bourgogne, France
- Aggai (disambiguation)
- Aggay, a barangay (district) of Bantay, Ilocos Sur, Philippines
- Agge (disambiguation)
- Aggey (disambiguation)
- Aghai, an Irish pentagraph
- Agi (disambiguation)
- Hagai, variant spelling of Haggai, a saint and minor prophet
- Açaí, a plant mainly used for its fruit.
