= Agie =

Agie may refer to:

- Agie River, a river in the Kobuk Valley National Park in Alaska
- Awaovieyi Agie, founding member of the Canadian Obsidian Theatre

== See also ==
- Aggie (disambiguation)
- Agi (disambiguation)
- Agii (disambiguation)
