= Aggi =

Aggi may refer to:

- The Aggi Crew, an organized crime syndicate from Bristol, England
- Aggi-Bhagava, an Indian god
- The Aggi-Vacchagotta Sutta, a Buddhist sutta
- Throw Aggi Off the Bridge, a 1992 EP by Black Tambourine
- Agrostemma githago, the common corncockle plant, USDA code: AGGI
- Babanakira Airport, an airport in the Solomon Islands, ICAO code: AGGI
- The Annual Greenhouse Gas Index, a measure of Earth's energy imbalance

== See also ==
- Agey, a commune in Côte-d'Or, Bourgogne, France
- AGG (disambiguation)
- Agge (disambiguation)
- Saint Aggei, Wycliffe's spelling of Mar Aggai, the second Bishop of Edessa, Mesopotamia
- Aggey (disambiguation)
- Aggie (disambiguation)
- Aggy (disambiguation)
- Agi (disambiguation)
- Agii (disambiguation)
- Agy, a commune in the Basse-Normandie région of France
