= Agge =

Agge, AgGe, AgGE, or AGGE may refer to:

== Places ==
- Agge, a village in Ekeremor, Bayelsa State, Nigeria
- Agge, a village near Shashamane, Ethiopia
- Balalae Airport, in the Solomon Islands (ICAO code: AGGE)

== Science and technology ==
- Agarose gel electrophoresis, a technique in microbiology
- Agalinis georgiana, the beach false foxglove plant (USDA code: AGGE), also known as Agalinis fasciculata

=== Silver and germanium ===
- AgGe; compounds formed by silver and germanium. These elements may form:
  - A common alloy used for many purposes including sterling silver, specifically known as argentium on its own
  - A crystal structure
  - A metal-semiconductor interface; see metal-induced gap states

== Other uses ==
- Agge, the father of Sven Aggesen, a Danish historian
- Sawdhan Agge, an album by Indian comedian Bhagwant Mann
- Ad hoc Group of Governmental Experts, a title given to many committees of the United Nations

== See also ==
- Aga (disambiguation)
- Agadoo doo doo, a nonsense lyric from 1984 novelty song Agadoo
- Agar, a gelatinous substance used in confectionery and microbiology
- Age (disambiguation)
- Agey, a commune in Côte-d'Or, Bourgogne, France
- AGG (disambiguation)
- AAGE, the Australian Association of Graduate Employers
- Agga (disambiguation)
- Aggar (disambiguation)
- Saint Aggei, Wycliffe's spelling of Mar Aggai, the second Bishop of Edessa, Mesopotamia
- Agger, a Roman embankment
- Aggey (disambiguation)
- Aggi (disambiguation)
- Aggie (disambiguation)
- Aggy (disambiguation)
- Agha (disambiguation)
- Agy, a commune in the Basse-Normandie région of France
- Egge (disambiguation)
