= AGY =

Agy or AGY may refer to:

- Agy, a commune in Basse Normandie, France
- Southern Alta language (ISO 639 code: agy), a language of the Philippines
- Anglesey, island in Wales, Chapman code
- Argyle Downs Airport, IATA code "AGY"

== See also ==
- Agi (disambiguation)
- Aggie (disambiguation)
