= Barbirey-sur-Ouche =

- Commune
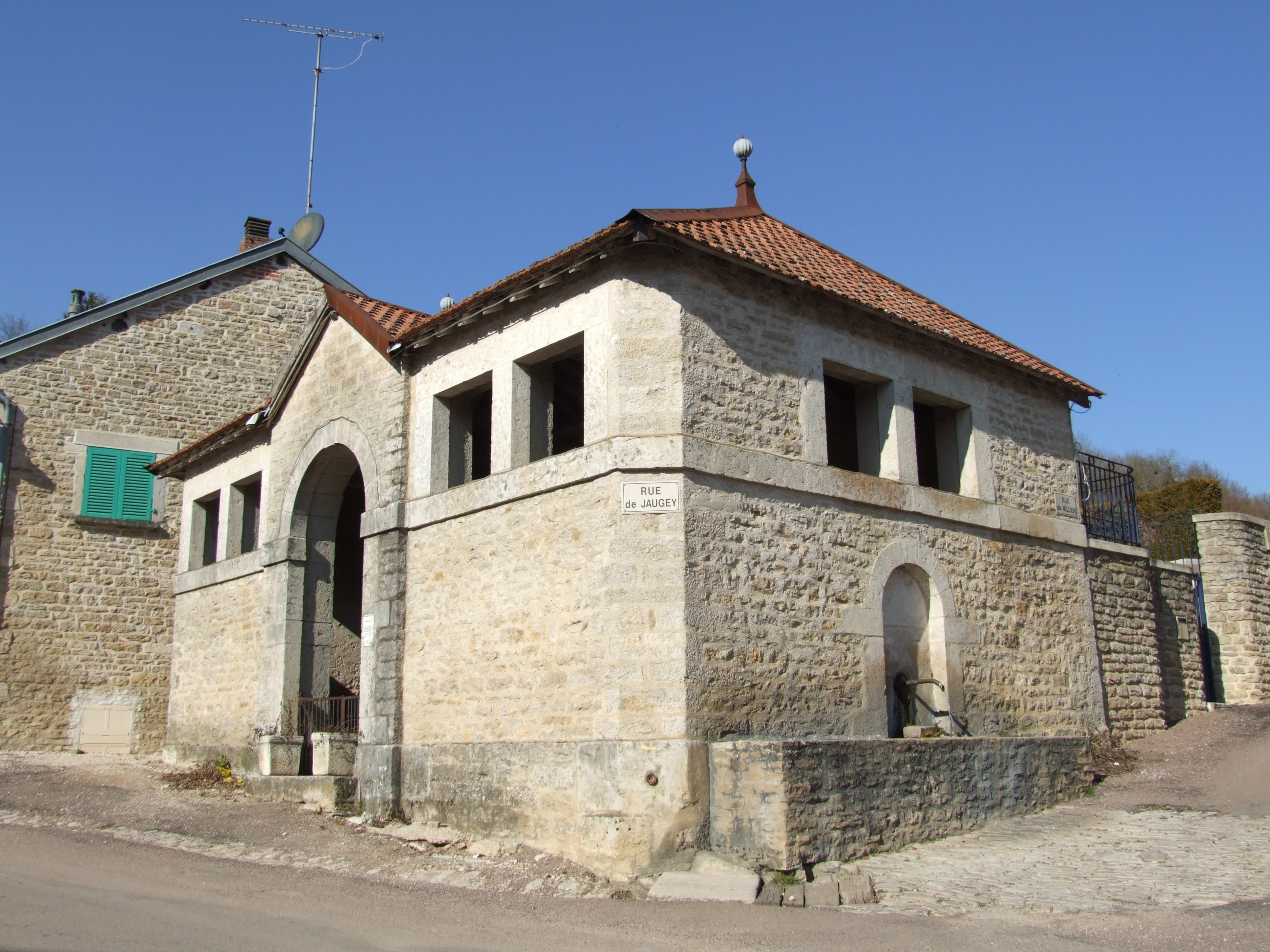
- Lavoir (Public laundry)

- Coat of arms
- Location of Barbirey-sur-Ouche
- Location within France Location within Bourgogne-Franche-Comté
- Coordinates: 47°15′13″N 4°45′20″E
- Country: France
- Region: Bourgogne-Franche-Comté
- Department: Côte-d'Or
- Arrondissement: Dijon
- Canton: Talant

Government
  - Mayor (2020–2026): Valérie Paupert
- Area^{1}: 10.76 km^{2} (4.15 sq mi)
- Elevation: 300 m (980 ft)
- Highest elevation: 589 m (1,932 ft)
- Lowest elevation: 298 m (978 ft)
- Population (2023): 259
  - Density: 24.1/km^{2} (62.3/sq mi)
- Time zone: UTC+01:00 (CET)
  - Summer (DST): UTC+02:00 (CEST)
- INSEE/Postal code: 21045 /21410
- ^{1} French Land Register data, which excludes lakes, ponds, glaciers > 1 km^{2} (0.386 sq mi or 247 acres) and river estuaries.

Barbirey-sur-Ouche (French pronunciation: [baʁbiʁɛ syʁ uʃ], literally Barbirey on Ouche) is a commune in the Côte-d'Or department in the Bourgogne-Franche-Comté region of eastern France.

== Geography ==
Barbirey-sur-Ouche is located some 25 km south-west of Dijon and 11 km east of Créancey. Access to the commune is by the D33 road from Gissey-sur-Ouche in the north-east which passes through the village and continues south to Saint-Victor-sur-Ouche. The D114 goes west from the village then north-west to Grenant-lès-Sombernon. The commune is heavily forested on the hillsides to the north and south with farmland in the valley.

The Ouche river passes through the commune just east of the village flowing from south to north to eventually join the Saône just east of Saint-Jean-de-Losne. The Ruisseau de la Gironde flows from the west down the valley to join the Ouche near the village. The Canal de Bourgogne (Burgundy Canal) also passes through the commune parallel to the Ouche on the eastern side. There are two locks in the commune - the Écluse de Dainevy to the south and another lock further north.

== History ==
On 17 March 1794 Jean Vivant Micault de Corbeton (10 May 1725 - 17 March 1794), Chairman of the Parliament of Burgundy in Dijon before the French Revolution, Lord of Agey, Meilly-sur-Rouvres, Rouvres-sous-Meilly, Saligny, Liernolles, Maconge, Barbirey-sur-Ouche, Santenay, Pommard, and other places, last Marquis of Joncy, and husband of Marie Françoise Trudaine, was beheaded in the Place du Morimont (now the Place Emile Zola) in Dijon.

Barbirey-sur-Ouche appears as Barbirey fur Ouche on the 1750 Cassini Map and the same on the 1790 version.

=== Heraldry ===
Arms of Barbirey-sur-Ouche	Blazon: Azure, a bend vivré of Or debruised by a label of 5 points of Gules at honour point.

== Administration ==
List of Successive Mayors

From	To	Name
1944	1981	Maurice Coquet
1981	1995	Jean-Paul Coquet
1995	2008	Michel Guichard
2008	2014	Jean-Claude Hayme
2014	2020	Robert Bott
2020	2026	Valérie Paupert

== Demography ==
The inhabitants of the commune are known as Barbirotins or Barbirotines in French.

Historical population

Year	Pop.	±% p.a.
1793	327	—
1821	358	+0.32%
1846	459	+1.00%
1872	393	−0.60%
1901	339	−0.51%
1926	214	−1.82%
1946	149	−1.79%
1962	137	−0.52%
1968	124	−1.65%

Year	Pop.	±% p.a.
1975	108	−1.95%
1982	140	+3.78%
1990	177	+2.97%
1999	224	+2.65%
2007	273	+2.50%
2012	245	−2.14%
2017	216	−2.49%
2023	259	+3.07%

Source: EHESS and INSEE

== Culture and heritage ==
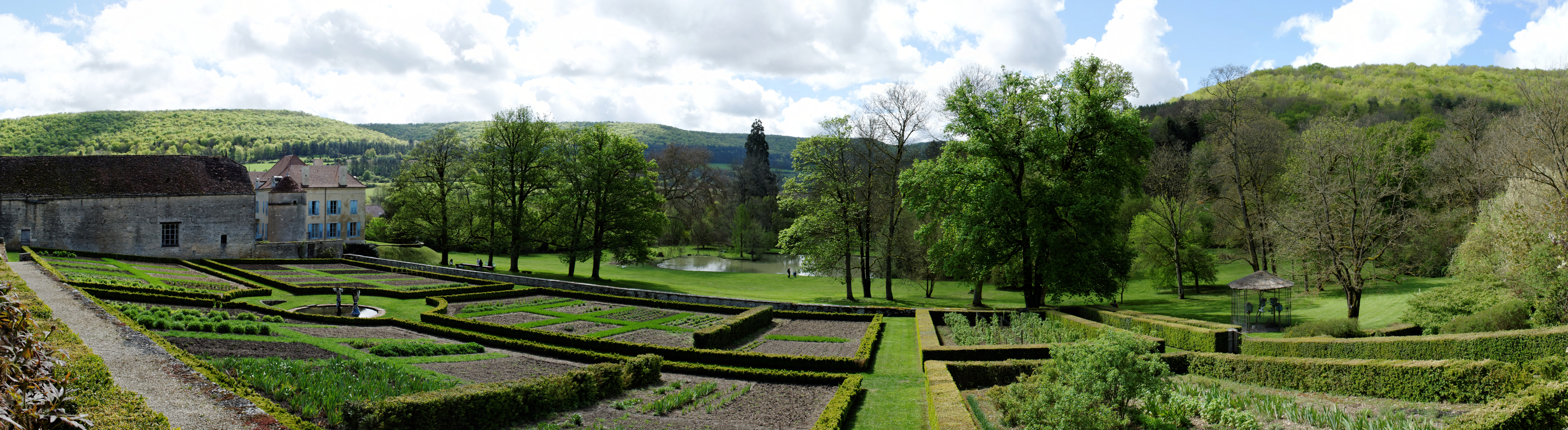
Panorama of the Chateau Grounds

=== Civil heritage ===
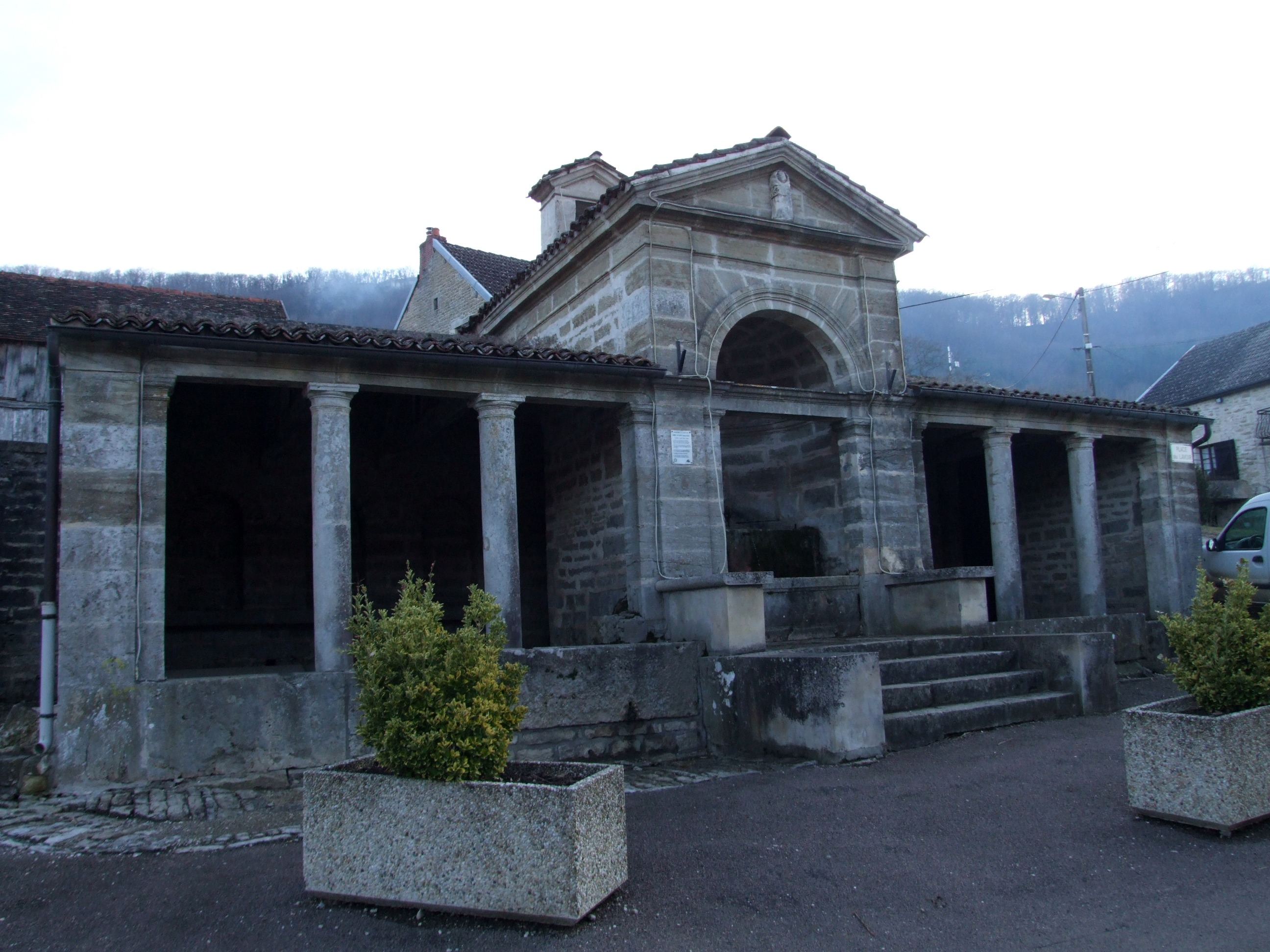
The Lavoir at Jaugey

The commune has a number of buildings and sites that are registered as historical monuments:

- A Vineyard (19th century)
- Houses and Farms (18th-19th century)
- A Chateau (16th century)
- The Chateau Grounds (17th century)
- A Lavoir (Public laundry) at Jaugey (1836). The Lavoir contains two items that are registered as historical objects:
  - A Bronze Bell (1515)
  - The Furniture in the Lavoir
- A Lavoir (Public laundry) (1863)
- A School (19th century)

Other sites of interest

- A Tumulus and cave at Roche-Chèvre

=== Barbirey-sur-Ouche Picture Gallery ===
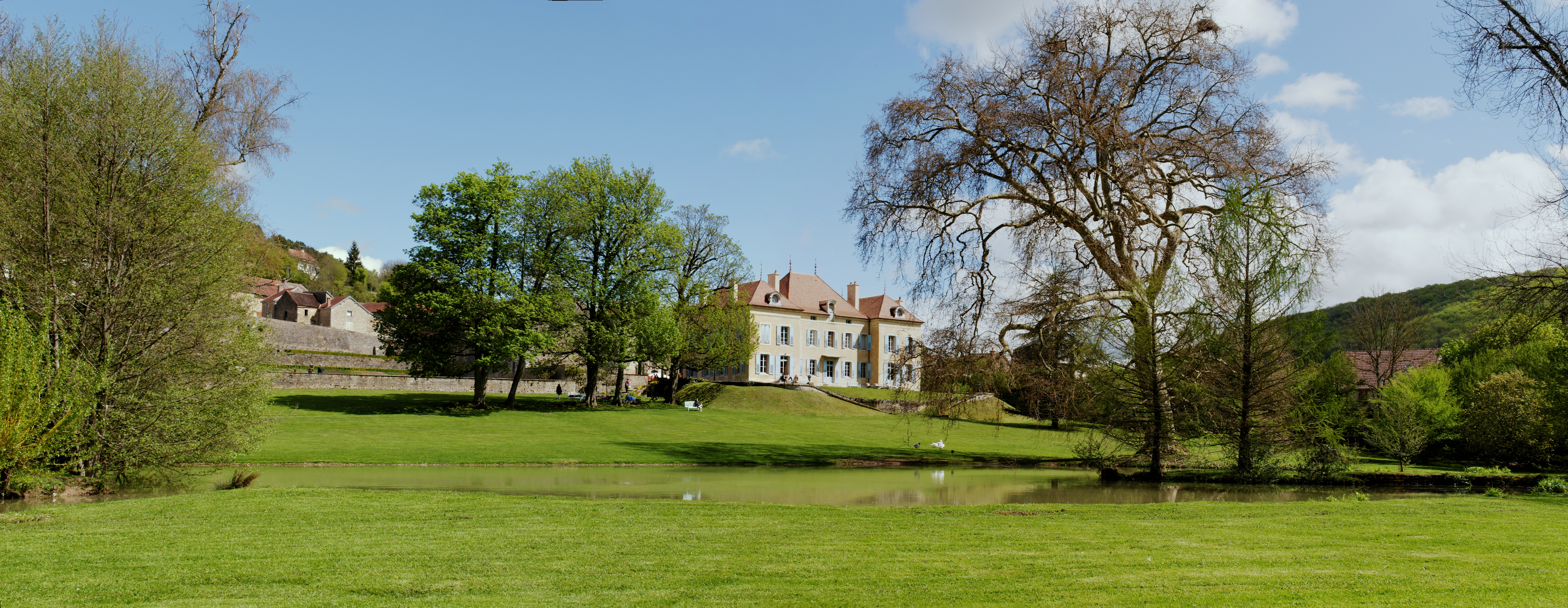
Panorama of the Chateau and grounds

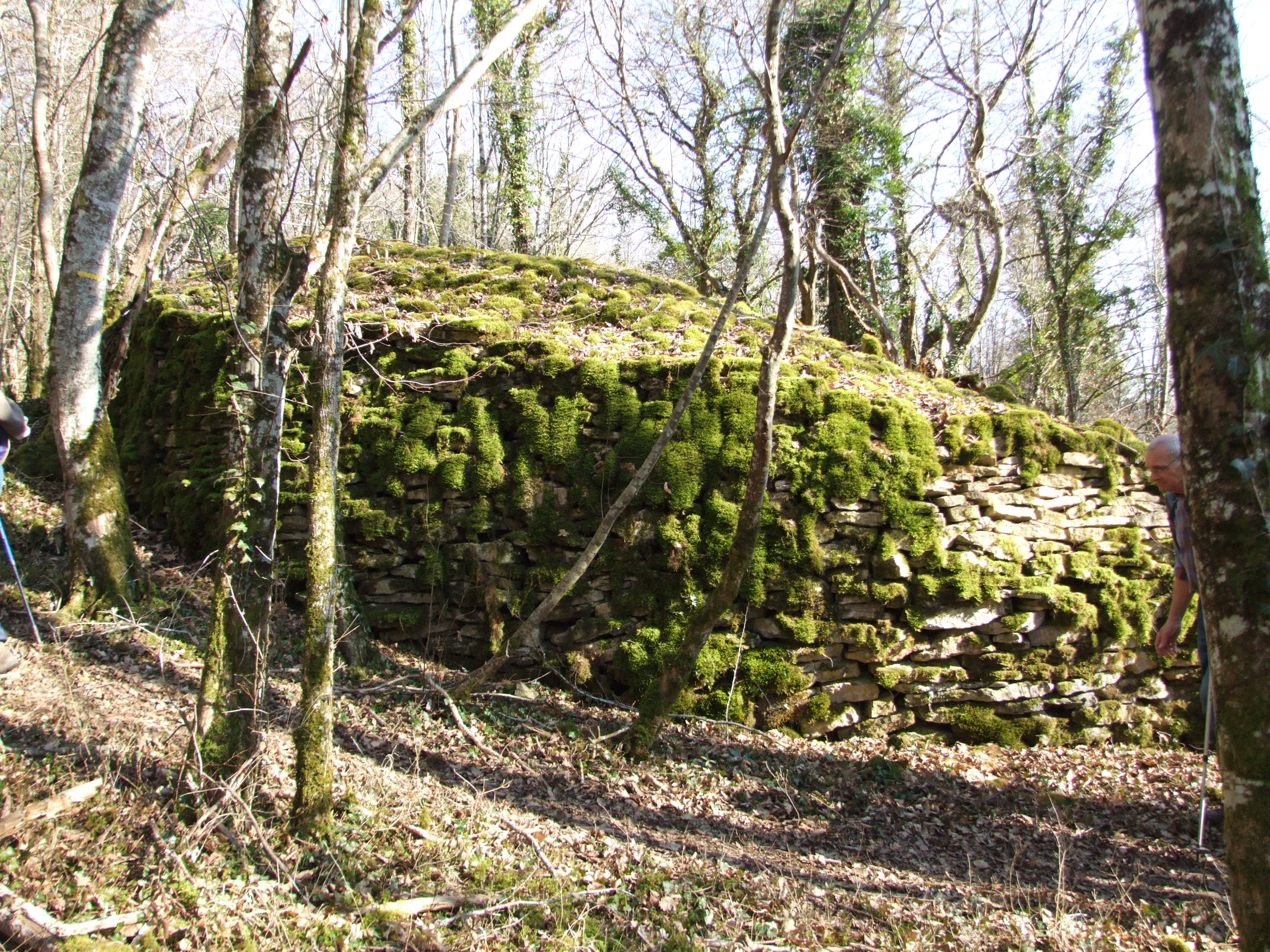
The Tumulus

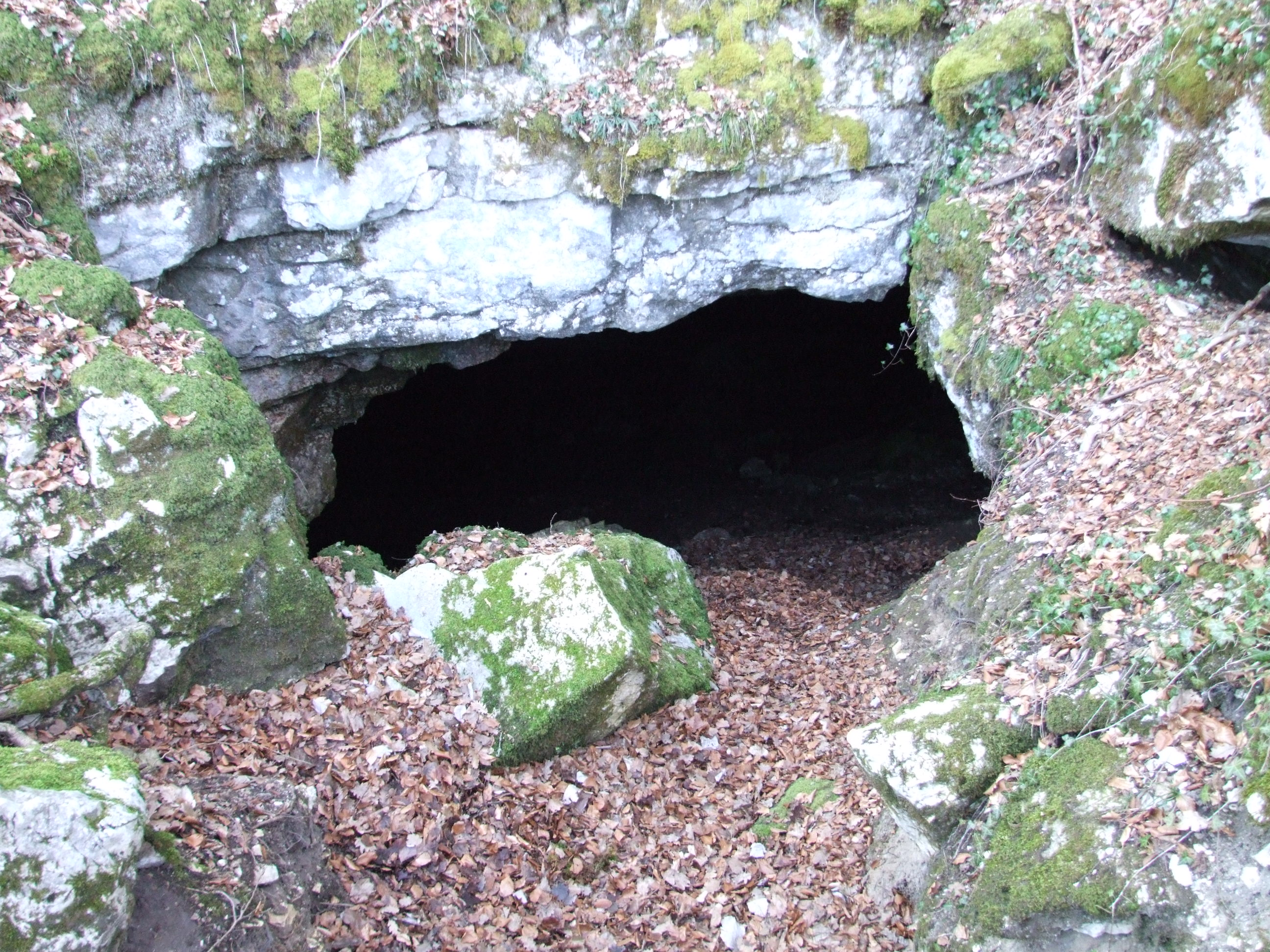
The cave at Roche Chèvre

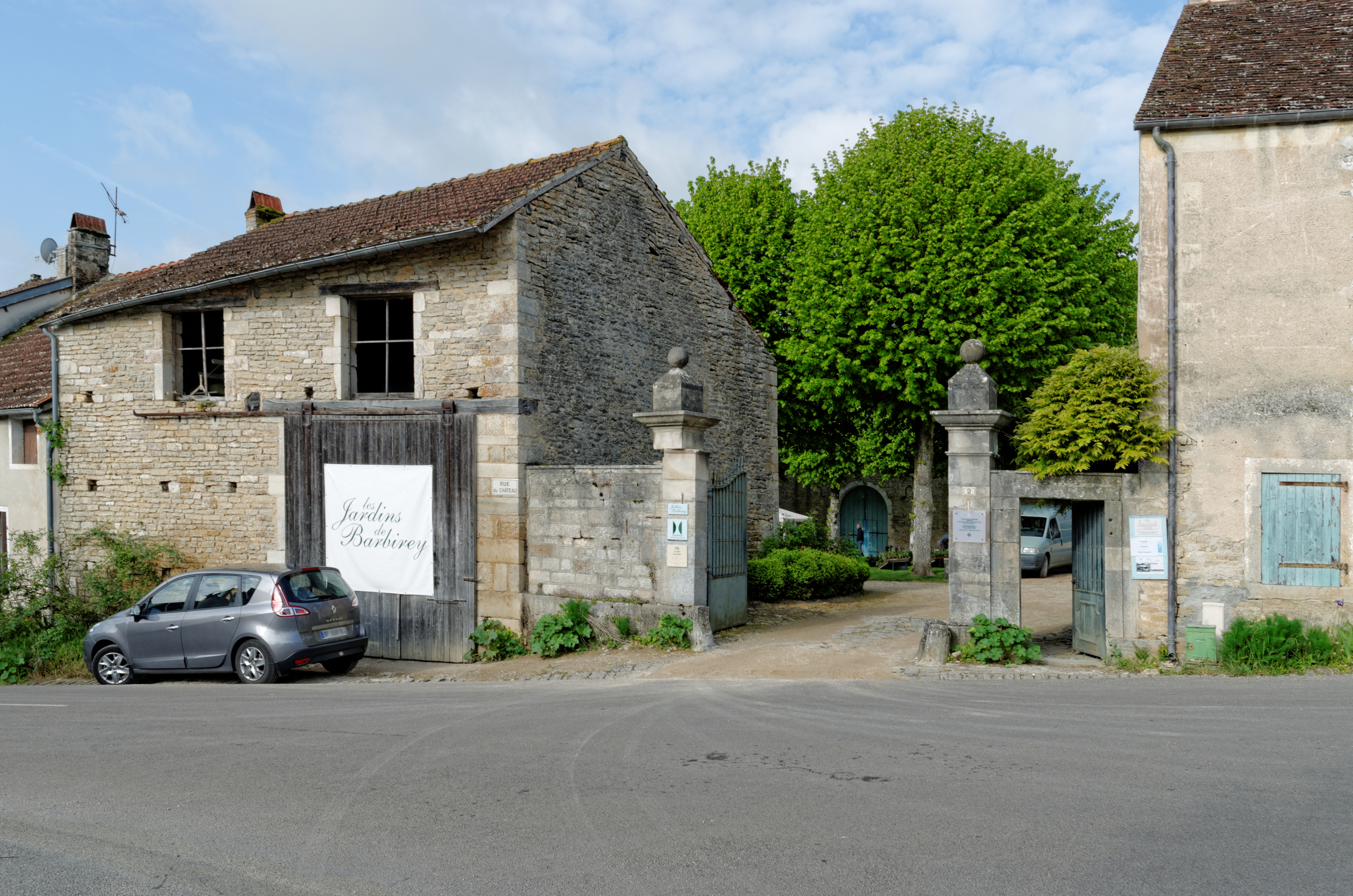
Entry to the Chateau

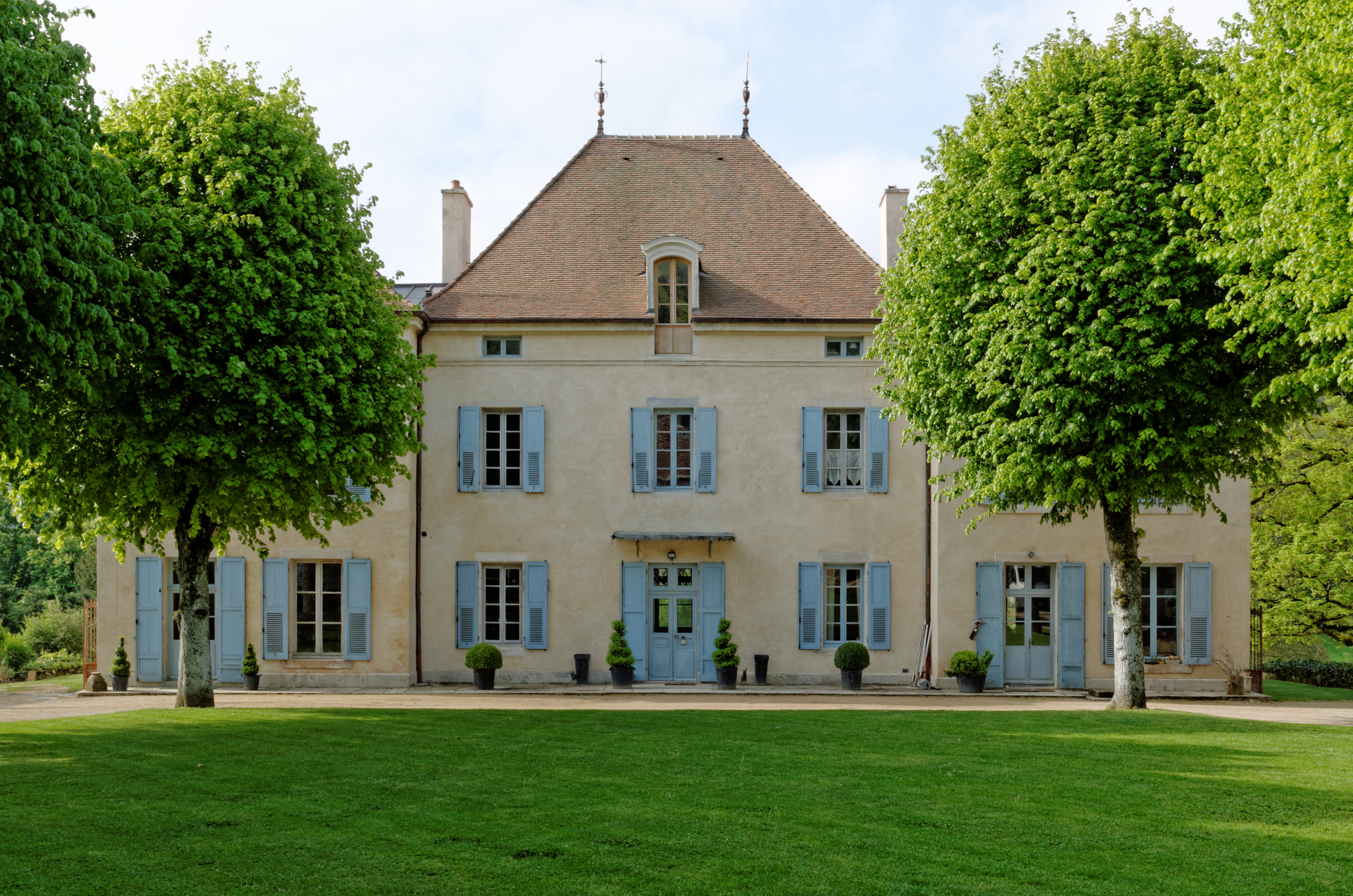
The Chateau

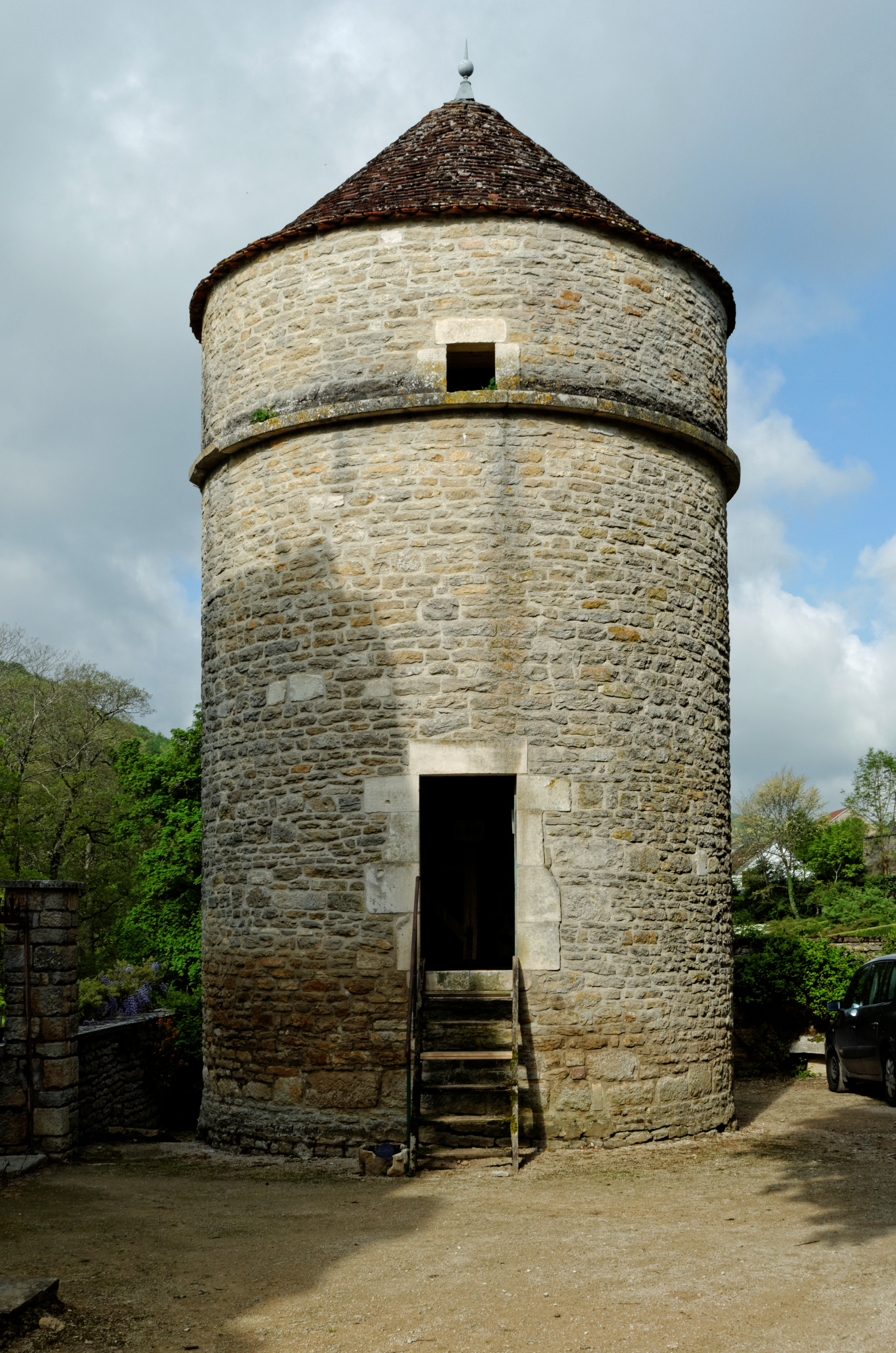
The Dovecote at the Chateau

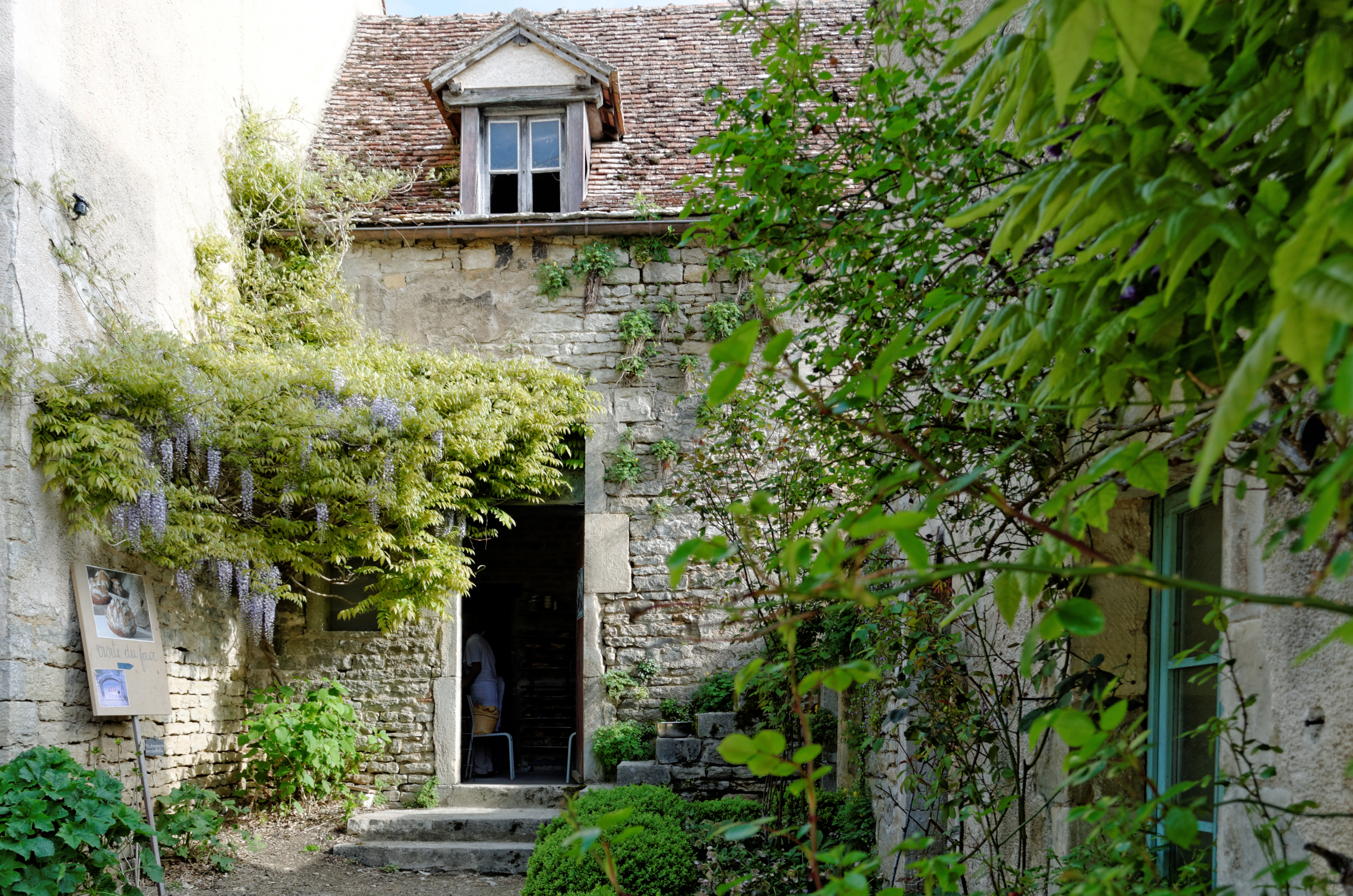
The entry to the bread oven

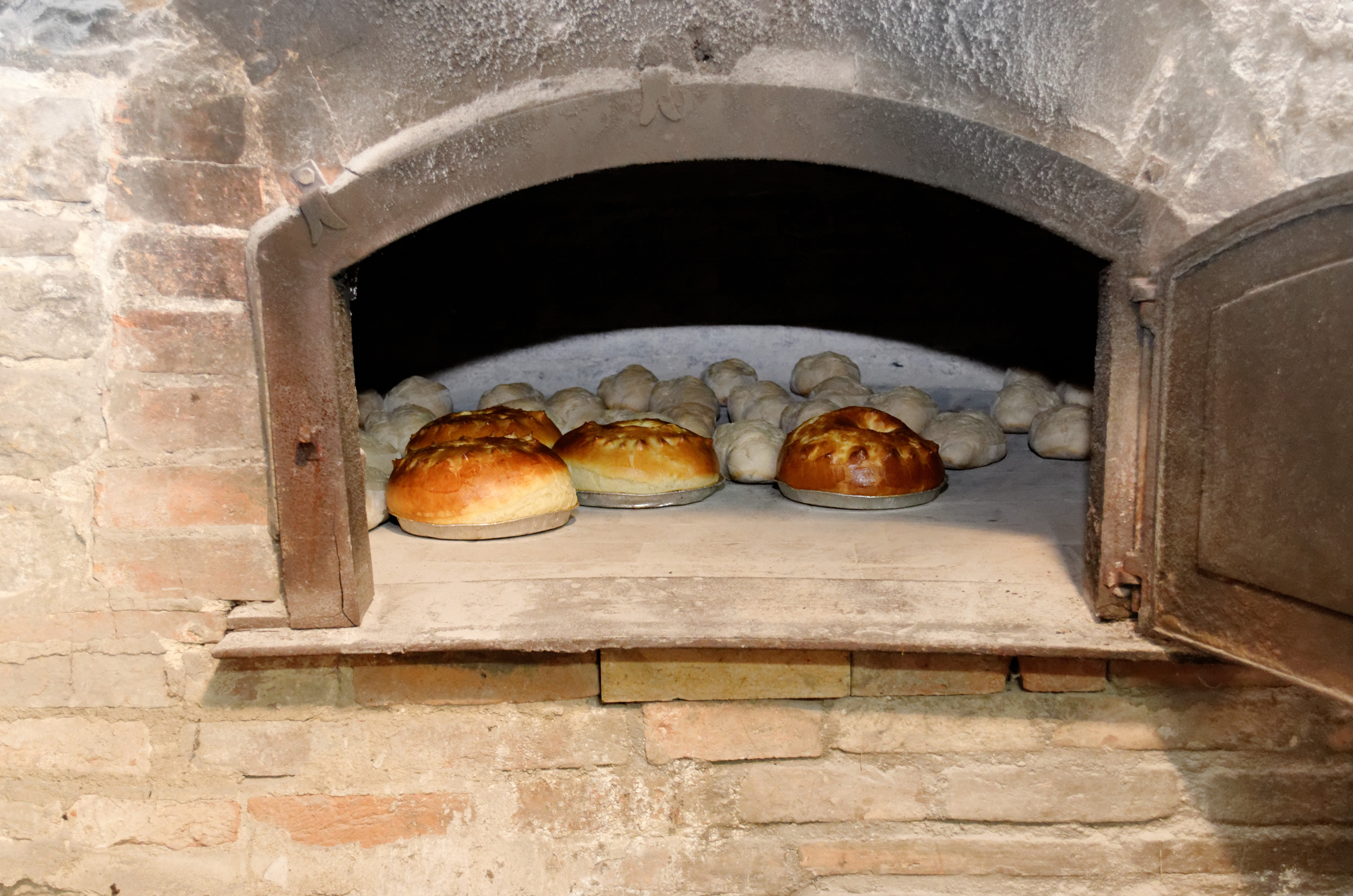
The bread oven at the Chateau

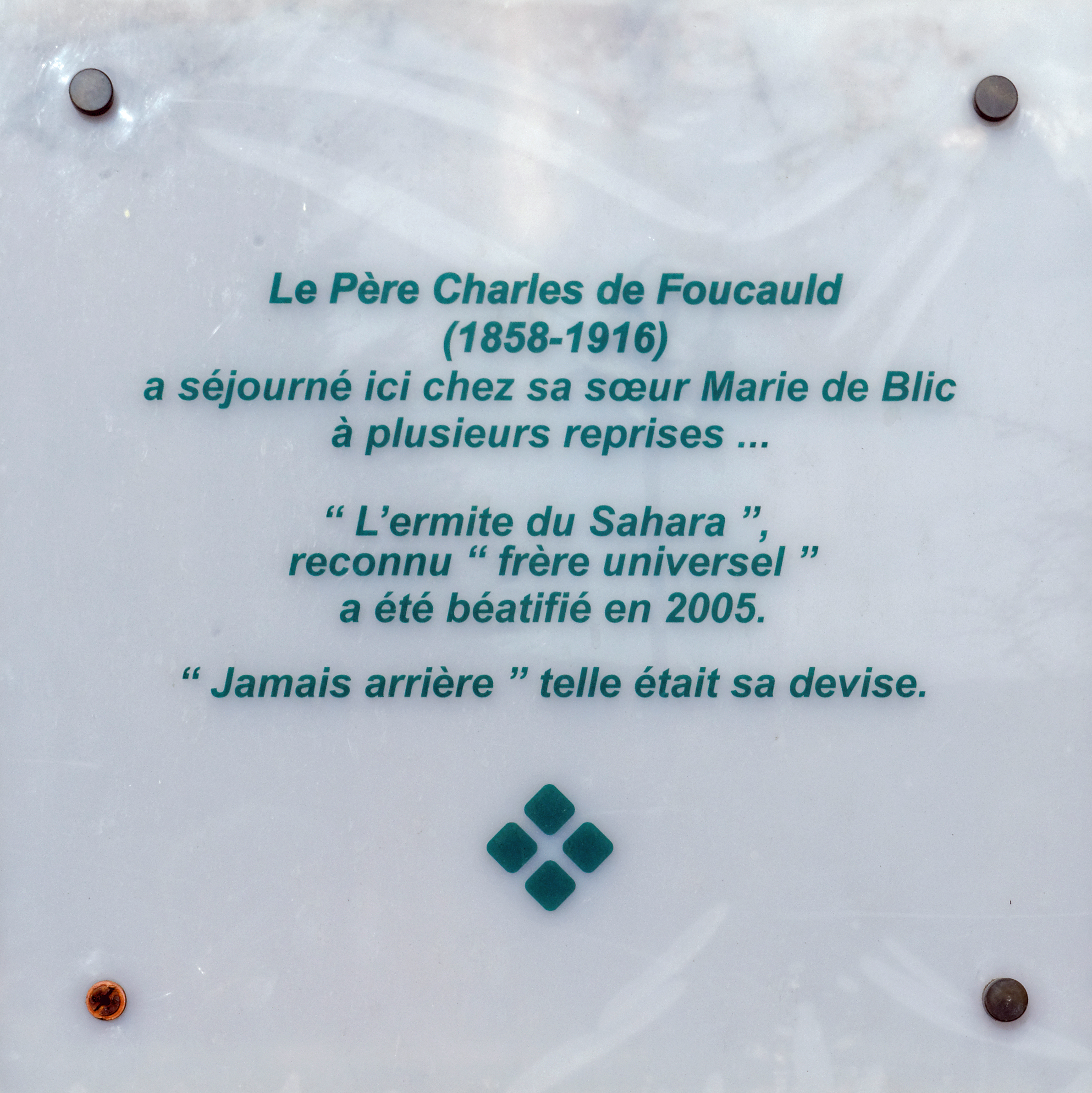
Plaque commemorating Charles de Foucauld

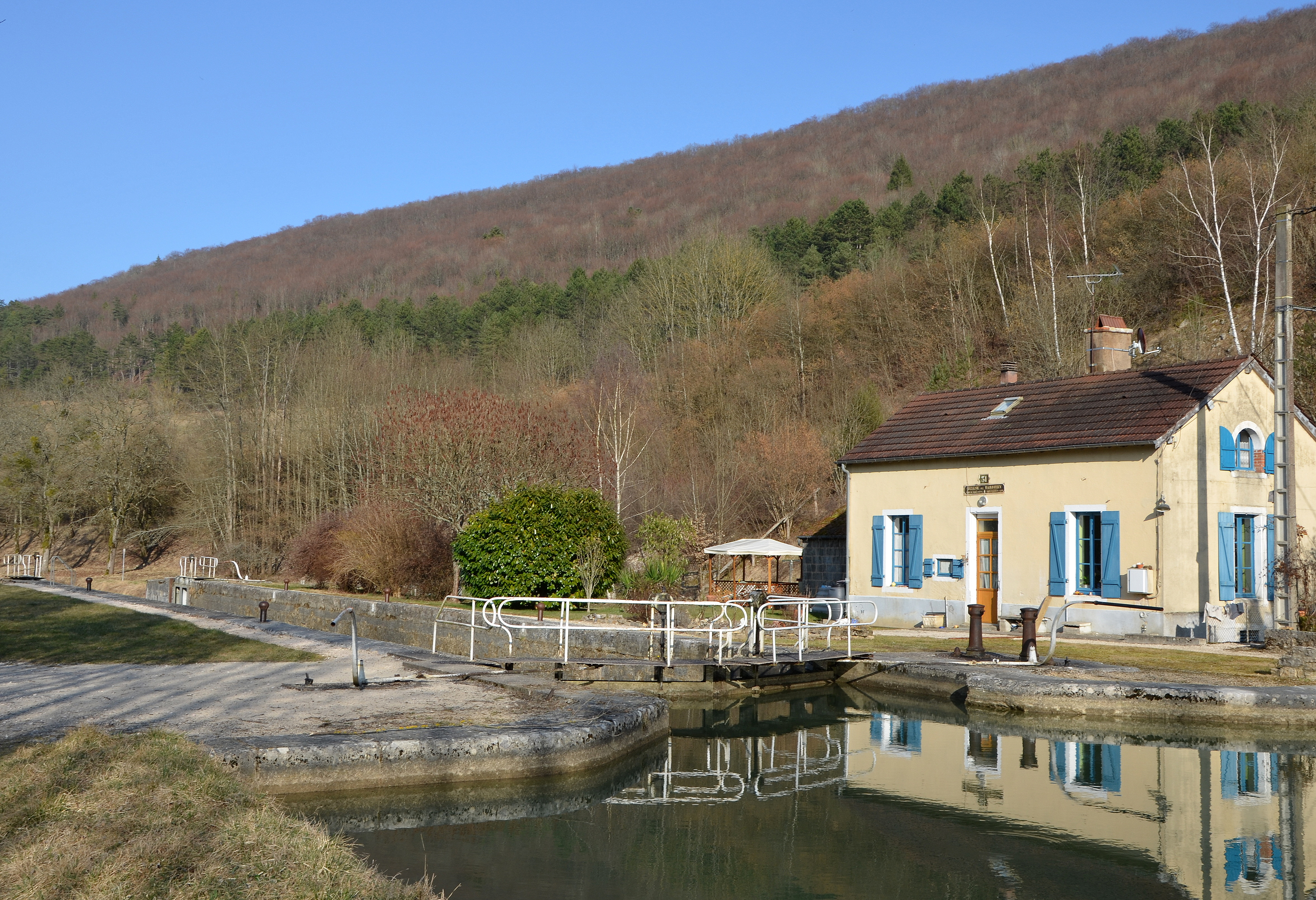
A lock on the Canal de Bourgogne in Barbirey-sur-Ouche

=== Religious heritage ===
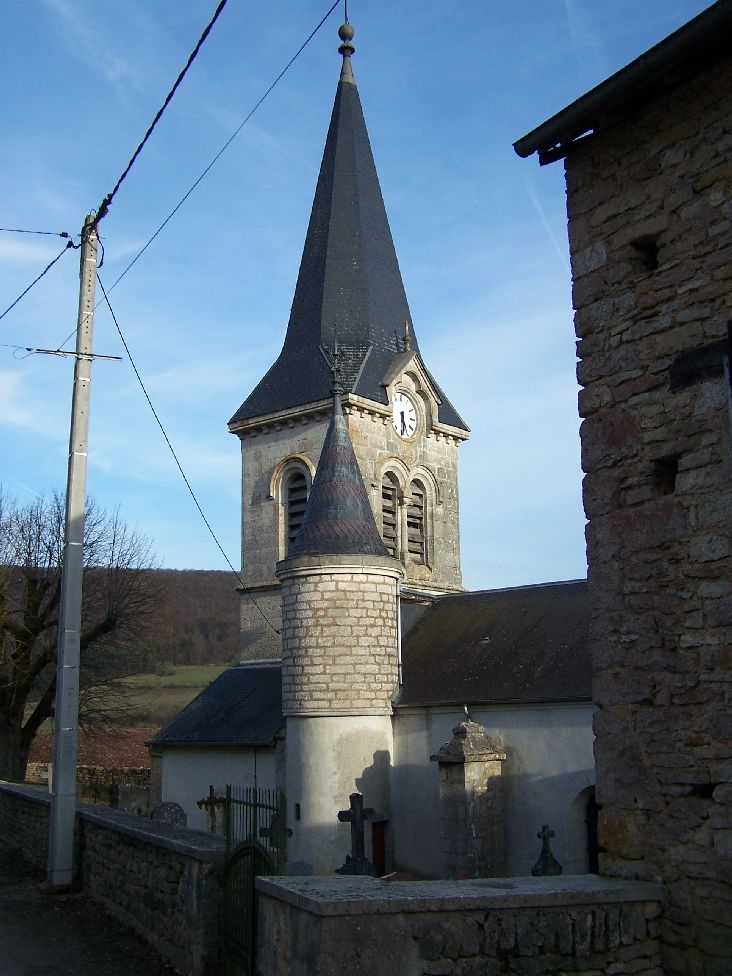
The Church of Saint Martin

The commune has several religious buildings and structures that are registered as historical monuments:

- The Parish Church of Saint Martin (12th century). The Church contains many items that are registered as historical objects:
  - A Bronze Bell (1521)
  - Statues (16th-19th century)
  - The Furniture in the Church
  - A Half-relief: Adoration of the Shepherds (18th century)
  - A Retable (18th century)

== See also ==
- Communes of the Côte-d'Or department
