= Agger =

Agger may refer to:

- Agger (surname)
- Agger (ancient Rome), a type of ancient Roman rampart or embankment
- Agger (river), a river in North Rhine-Westphalia, Germany
- Agger nasi, an anatomical feature of the nose
- Agger Rockshelter, in Wisconsin, United States
- Agger, Denmark, a village in Jutland, Denmark
- Agger Tange, a small peninsula in Jutland, Denmark
- Agger Valley Railway (disambiguation)
- Cranopsis agger, a species of sea snail
