= Aggey =

Aggey may refer to:

- John Kwao Amuzu Aggey, Archbishop of the Roman Catholic Archdiocese of Lagos, Nigeria
- The Aggey, informal name for Moss Valley, Wrexham, Wales

== See also ==
- Agaie, a town and local government area in Nigeria
- Agaie Emirate, a historical state in present-day Nigeria
- Agey, a commune in Côte-d'Or, Bourgogne, France
- Aggai (disambiguation)
- Aggay, a barangay (district) of Bantay, Ilocos Sur, Philippines
- Agge (disambiguation)
- Aggi (disambiguation)
- Aggie (disambiguation)
- Aggy (disambiguation)
- Aghai, an Irish pentagraph
- Agi (disambiguation)
- Agii (disambiguation)
- Haggai, a saint and minor prophet
