= Egge =

Egge is the name of various elongated hill crests or ridges in the Low German dialect. It may also refer to:

== Places ==
=== Germany ===
- Egge (Lower Saxon Hills), a long ridge in the Lower Saxon Hills that continues the Teutoburg Forest to the south.
- Egge, a historical name for the river Egau, a tributary of the river Danube
- Eggeberg (Egge region) (437 m), a hill in the Egge Region near Veldrom (Horn-Bad Meinberg), Lippe, North Rhine-Westphalia
- Große Egge (312 m), a hill in the Teutoburg Forest, Gütersloh, North Rhine-Westphalia
- Lutternsche Egge (256 m), a hill in the Wiehen Hills, near Volmerdingsen (Bad Oeynhausen), Minden-Lübbecke, North Rhine-Westphalia
- Egge (Wiehen Hills) (220.2 m), a side ridge of the Wiehen Hills that gives its name to the Eggetal valley, in Osnabrück and Minden-Lübbecke, Lower Saxony and North Rhine-Westphalia
- Hörster Egge (206 m), a high point in the Teutoburg Forest near Billinghausen (Lage), Lippe, North Rhine-Westphalia
- Schleptruper Egge (146.9 m), a hill in the Wiehen Hills, near Schleptrup (Bramsche), Osnabrück, Lower Saxony
- Larberger Egge (82.5 m) a high point near Achmer (Bramsche), Osnabrück, Lower Saxony
- Kleine Egge, a hill in the Teutoburg Forest near Kohlstädt (Schlangen), Lippe, North Rhine-Westphalia

=== Norway ===
- Egge, Buskerud, a village in Lier Municipality in Buskerud county
- Egge, Innlandet, a village in Gran Municipality in Innlandet county
- Egge, Vestland, a village in Gloppen Municipality in Vestland county
- Egge Church, a church in Steinkjer Municipality in Trøndelag county
- Egge Municipality, a former municipality (1869-1964) in the old Nord-Trøndelag county

== Other uses ==
- Egge (surname)
- Egge Kulbok-Lattik (born 1966) Estonian cultural studies scholar

== See also ==
- Eggen (disambiguation)
- Große Egge
