= Addai of Edessa =

Christian saint and one of the seventy disciples of Jesus

Saint Thaddeus of Edessa Addai ܡܪܝ ܐܕܝ
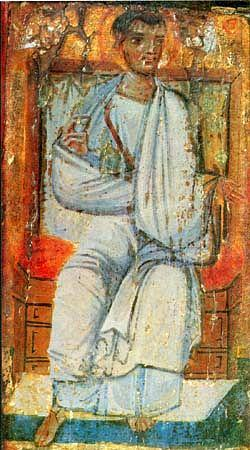
- Icon of St. Thaddeus (10th century, Saint Catherine's Monastery, Mount Sinai)

Disciple of the Seventy
- Born: c. 1st century AD; Edessa, Osroene, Roman Empire
- Died: c. 2nd century AD
- Venerated in: Church of the East; Roman Catholic Church; Eastern Orthodox Church; Oriental Orthodox Church; Church of Caucasian Albania
- Feast: August 5
- Patronage: Assyrians

According to Eastern Christian tradition, Addai of Edessa (Syriac: ܡܪܝ ܐܕܝ, Mar Addai or Mor Aday sometimes Latinized Addeus) or Thaddeus of Edessa was one of the seventy disciples of Jesus.

== Life ==
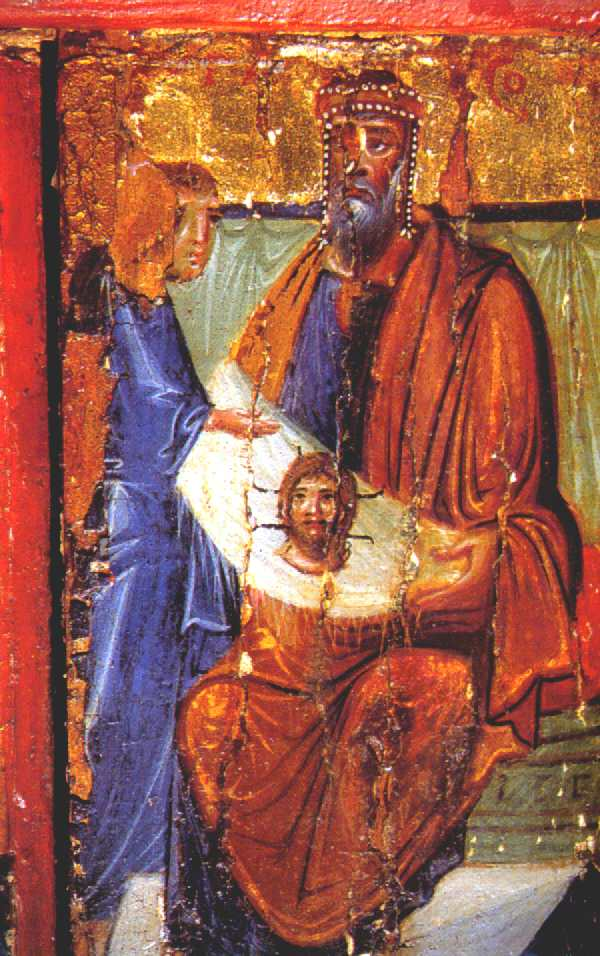
Abgar receiving the Mandylion from Addai (encaustic icon, Saint Catherine's Monastery, Mount Sinai).

Based on various Eastern Christian traditions, Addai was a Jew born in Edessa (now Şanlıurfa, Turkey). He came to Jerusalem for a festival where he heard the preaching of John the Baptist (St. John the Forerunner). After being baptized in the Jordan River, he remained in Judea and became a follower of Jesus. He was chosen as one of the seventy disciples sent in pairs to preach in the cities and places.

After Pentecost and the ascension of Jesus, Addai started preaching the gospel in Mesopotamia, Syria and Persia. He ordained priests in Edessa, converted many to Christianity and built up the church there. He also went to Beirut to preach, and many believe that he founded a church there.

The Syriac liturgy referred to as the Liturgy of Addai and Mari originated around the year 200 AD and is used by the Assyrian Church of the East and the Chaldean Catholic Church (both of which are based in Iraq); it is also used by the Eastern Syriac Churches in India which trace their origins to Thomas the Apostle, namely, the Chaldean Syrian Church and Syro-Malabar Catholic Church .

His feast is celebrated on August 5 in the Christian calendar.

== Addai and the healing of King Abgar ==
Among the Eastern Orthodox faithful, Addai was a disciple of Christ sent by St. Thomas the Apostle to Edessa in order to heal King Abgar V of Osroene, who had fallen ill. He stayed to evangelize, and so converted Abgar and his people including Saint Aggai and Saint Mari.

The story of how King Abgarus V and Jesus had corresponded was first recounted in the 4th century by the church historian Eusebius of Caesarea. In the origin of the legend, Eusebius had been shown documents purporting to contain the official correspondence that passed between Abgar and Jesus, and he was well enough convinced by their authenticity to quote them extensively in his Ecclesiastical History. According to Eusebius:

Thomas, one of the twelve apostles, under divine impulse sent Thaddeus, who was also numbered among the seventy disciples of Christ, to Edessa, as a preacher and evangelist of the teaching of Christ. (Historia Ecclesiastica, I, xiii)

The story of the healing and Addai's evangelizing efforts resulted in the growing of Christian communities in southern Armenia, northern Mesopotamia and in Syria east of Antioch. Thaddeus' story is embodied in the Syriac document, Doctrine of Addai, which recounts the role of Addai and makes him one of the 72 Apostles sent out to spread the Christian faith. By the time the legend had returned to Syria, the purported site of the miraculous image, it had been embroidered into a tissue of miraculous happenings.

== Various traditions ==
St. Addai also appears in the First Apocalypse of James and the Second Apocalypse of James.

In Roman Catholic tradition, he and Saint Mari are considered patrons of Persian and Assyrian people.

Church of the East titles
Preceded by Mar Thoma (c. 34–c. 50)	Patriarch of the East; Bishop of Edessa (c. 50–c. 66)	Succeeded by Mar Aggai (c. 66–c. 81)
