= Eggen =

Eggen may refer to

== People ==
- Eggen (surname), a Norwegian surname

== Places ==
=== Norway ===
- Eggen (Norway), a mountain in Vågå Municipality in Innlandet county

=== Switzerland ===
- Eggen (Betten), a heritage site in the municipality of Betten in the Swiss canton of Valais
- Eggen (Eggerberg), a settlement in the municipality of Eggerberg in the Swiss canton of Valais
- Eggen (Simplon), a heritage site in the municipality of Simplon in the Swiss canton of Valais

== See also ==
- Eagan (disambiguation)
