= Aggie Stadium =

There are several stadiums that are associated with the name Aggie Stadium:

- Aggie Stadium (UC Davis), now UC Davis Health Stadium
- Aggie Stadium (North Carolina A&T), now Truist Stadium
- Aggie Memorial Stadium, football venue for New Mexico State University

== See also ==
- Aggie Soccer Stadium, better known as Aggie Field, on the campus of the University of California, Davis
- Aggie Soccer Stadium, former name of Ellis Field (Texas A&M), on the campus of Texas A&M University
