= Agi Lamm =

Hungarian-Argentine illustrator and artist

- Born: Magdalena Agnes Lamm; October 7, 1914; Budapest, Hungary
- Died: December 25, 1996 (aged 82)
- Notable work: Illustrated "La Serenita" by Hans Christian Andersen
- Awards: The Festival Nacional Infantil (1945) 1st place

Magdalena Agnes Lamm (7 June 1914 – 25 August 1996), better known by her pseudonym Agi, was a Hungarian-Argentine illustrator, artist and craftsperson. After fleeing from racial prejudice in Austria, she settled in Argentina in 1940, where she worked as an illustrator for various Buenos Aires publishers.

== Life and career ==
Magdalena Agnes Lamm was born on 7 June 1914 in Budapest, Hungary. Her parents were well-off and owned land, and she grew up on the puszta—the plains in Hungary—as an only child. Lamm was of Jewish descent.

Lamm's family moved out of the plains and into Budapest in the mid-1920s. She briefly attended a girls' boarding school in Budapest, before she moved to Belgrade, Yugoslavia, where she lived with her mother in the late 1920s. Between 1930 and 1932, she began attending Vienna's Kunstgewerbeschule (Arts and Crafts School). At the school, she studied fashion design and took classes under artist Eduard Josef Wimmer-Wisgrill. She later worked as a set designer in Vienna, designing for literary cabarets.

In 1938, she left Austria and fled to France due to her "fear of racial harassment". She lived in exile for two years; in 1939, she moved to Bolivia, before finally arriving in Argentina in 1940. She settled down in Argentina and became a book illustrator in Buenos Aires, drawing under the pseudonym "Agi". She illustrated for the music publisher Ricordi and later the publisher Editorial Abril.

In 1945, she won first prize at the Festival Nacional Infantil, for illustrations in La Sirenita by Hans Christian Andersen. In 1950, she began illustrating for the book series "Colección Yo soy", working alongside Susi Hochstimm.

== Later life and death ==
Later in her life, Lamm developed Parkinson's disease. She was unable to continue making art with the disorder, and died in Buenos Aires on 25 August 1996.

== Works ==
=== Illustrated music arrangements ===
- Canciones de Navidad (1940) - compiled and transcribed by Rita Kurzmann Leuchter
- Cattciones infantiles Europeas (1941) - compiled by Rita Kurzmann Leuchter
- El pequeno violinista (1943) - written by Ljerko Spiller

=== Children's books ===
- La Sirenetta - written by Hans Christian Andersen, with an unknown translator
- Una aventura entre las flores (c. 1946) - written and illustrated by Agi
- Hansel y Gretel (1948) - written by Grimm and adapted by Α. Mar
- El senor ano tiene cuatro casitas (1948) - written by Noñé
- Yo soy la familia Quiquiriqui (c. 1949) - written and illustrated by Agi; part of series "Yo soy."
- A la ronda, ronda... (1950) - written by Gorito
- Los 7 cabritos (1950) - written by Grimm
- Yo soy el indiecito (c. 1950) - written by Susi; part of series "Yo soy."
- Yo soy el osito de juguete (c. 1950) - written by Susi; part of series "Yo soy."
