= Prâlon =

- Commune
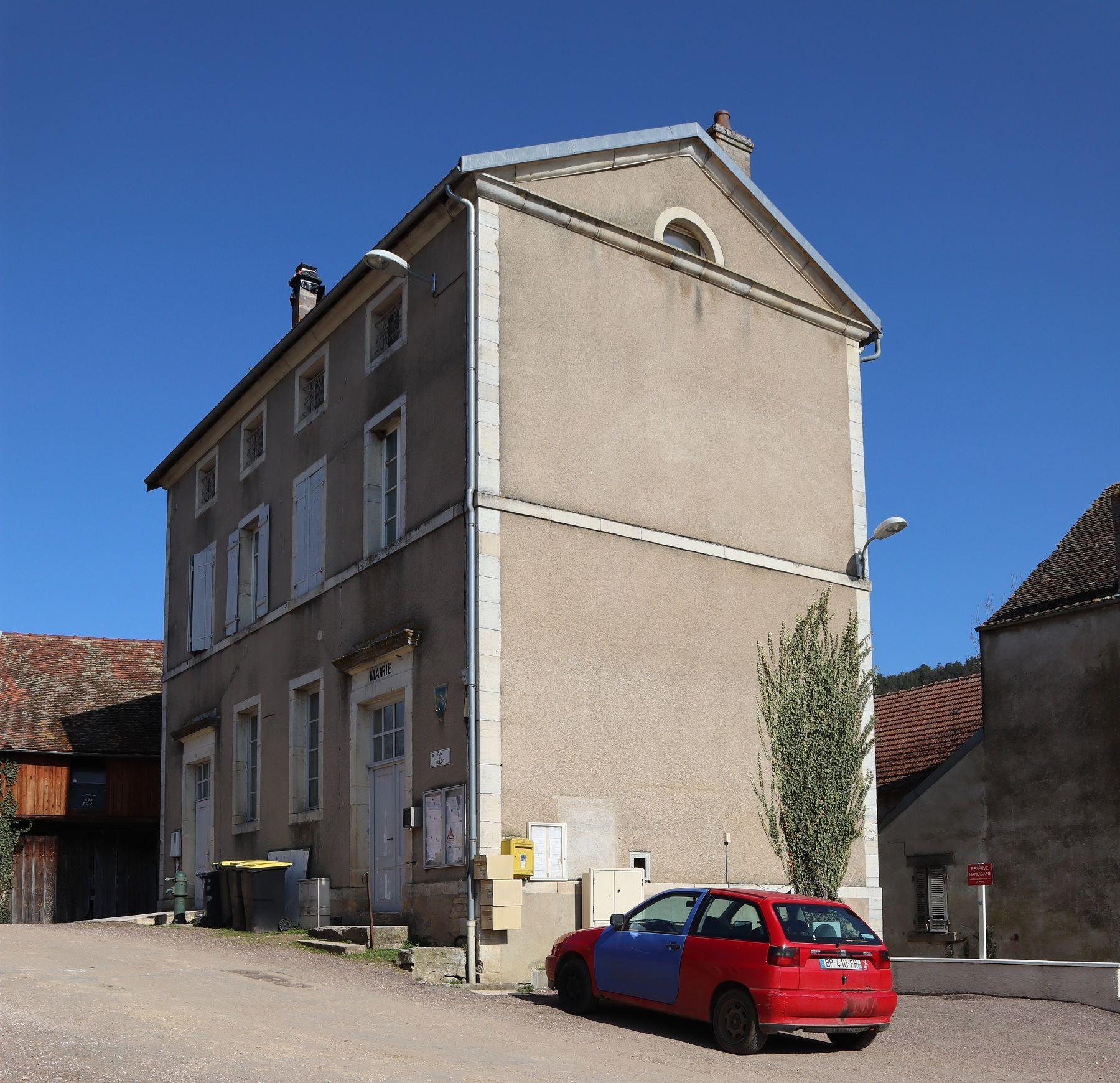
- Town hall

- Coat of arms
- Location of Prâlon
- Location within France Location within Bourgogne-Franche-Comté
- Coordinates: 47°18′39″N 4°46′34″E
- Country: France
- Region: Bourgogne-Franche-Comté
- Department: Côte-d'Or
- Arrondissement: Dijon
- Canton: Talant

Government
  - Mayor (2020–2026): Gérard Verdreau
- Area^{1}: 3.09 km^{2} (1.19 sq mi)
- Elevation: 317 m (1,040 ft)
- Highest elevation: 445 m (1,460 ft)
- Lowest elevation: 295 m (968 ft)
- Population (2023): 109
  - Density: 35.3/km^{2} (91.4/sq mi)
- Time zone: UTC+01:00 (CET)
  - Summer (DST): UTC+02:00 (CEST)
- INSEE/Postal code: 21504 /21410
- ^{1} French Land Register data, which excludes lakes, ponds, glaciers > 1 km^{2} (0.386 sq mi or 247 acres) and river estuaries.

Prâlon (French pronunciation: [pʁalɔ̃]) is a commune in the Côte-d'Or department in eastern France.

== Population ==
Historical population
Year	Pop.	±% p.a.
1968	79	—
1975	75	−0.74%
1982	64	−2.24%
1990	71	+1.31%
1999	88	+2.41%
2007	79	−1.34%
2012	83	+0.99%
2017	89	+1.41%
2023	109	+3.44%
Source: INSEE

== See also ==
- Communes of the Côte-d'Or department
