= Mary Aggie =

- Born: Virginia Colony
- Occupation: Enslaved woman
- Known for: Trial leading to change in Virginia statute law (benefit of clergy for enslaved people)

Mary Aggie was an enslaved African-American known for participating in a trial that resulted in a change in Virginia's statute law that allowed enslaved people to claim benefit of clergy.

In the late 1720s, Aggie tried to sue for her freedom. The attempt was unsuccessful, but caught the attention of Lieutenant Governor William Gooch, who presided over the trial and believed that Aggie had made a good case of establishing her belief in Christianity. This proved to be beneficial when, in September 1730, she was indicted for stealing goods valued at forty shillings from her enslaver, Annie or Anne Sullivan. The value of the goods was enough to make it a felony, which was punishable by death during this time period, and Aggie was brought to trial in York County, Virginia.

Upon hearing of her predicament, Gooch sent an attorney to monitor the trial. Aggie again tried to plead for the benefit of clergy but was denied, and Gooch appealed the decision. The appeal was divided, and the case was referred to England for a final ruling. On May 6, 1731, Aggie was pardoned on the condition that she leave Virginia. On July 1, 1732, the Virginia General Assembly ruled that "any Negro, mulatto or Indian whatsoever" could claim benefit of clergy. While this was a victory for Gooch, the new law was also restrictive since it limited the number of instances where enslaved people, Blacks, or Indians could use this plea. The law also had other detrimental effects, as these people would now be unable to give testimony in court for any reason other than an enslaved person being brought up for a capital offense and would also enable courts to use other forms of corporal punishment other than death.

== Notes ==
- Scholars differ on the spelling of Sullivan's first name.
