= Alfred John Agg =

Australian politician

Alfred John Agg (1830–1886) was an Australian colonial public servant and a commissioner of railways in Victoria.

== Biography ==
Agg was born on 2 March 1830 at Evesham, Worcestershire, the son of George Agg and Sophie Euphemia Cheek. He was educated at the Worcester grammar school, and entered the service of the Great Western Railway Company as a clerk at Reading in 1846, where he remained until 1850, when he emigrated to Australia.

He arrived in Victoria in 1851, and was employed in the Chief Secretary's office and the Immigration Department. He was afterwards appointed Government Storekeeper, which position he resigned in 1866, and became president of the new department created to supersede the old system of commissariat control. His abilities in this office were rewarded by his appointment as Under Treasurer, and on 13 October 1867, he was made Commissioner of Audit.

In 1883 he was granted a year's leave, which he spent in making a tour of the world, and in his absence he was nominated to act under Mr. Speight as a commissioner under the Railways Management Act. Mr. Agg was admitted to the Victorian Bar on 6 December 1860, and died on 16 October 1886.
