= Egge (surname) =

Egge is a Norwegian surname. The surname is often confused with the surname Edge. Notable people with the surname include:

- Ana Egge (born 1976), American folk singer/songwriter
- Bjørn Egge (1918–2007), resistance fighter and major general in the Norwegian Defence Force
- Ketil Egge (1950–1997), Norwegian actor and theatre director
- Klaus Egge (1906–1979), Norwegian composer and music critic
- Peter Egge (1869–1959), Norwegian writer
- Ørnulf Egge (1910–1978), Norwegian politician
