= Arrondissements of the Côte-d'Or department =

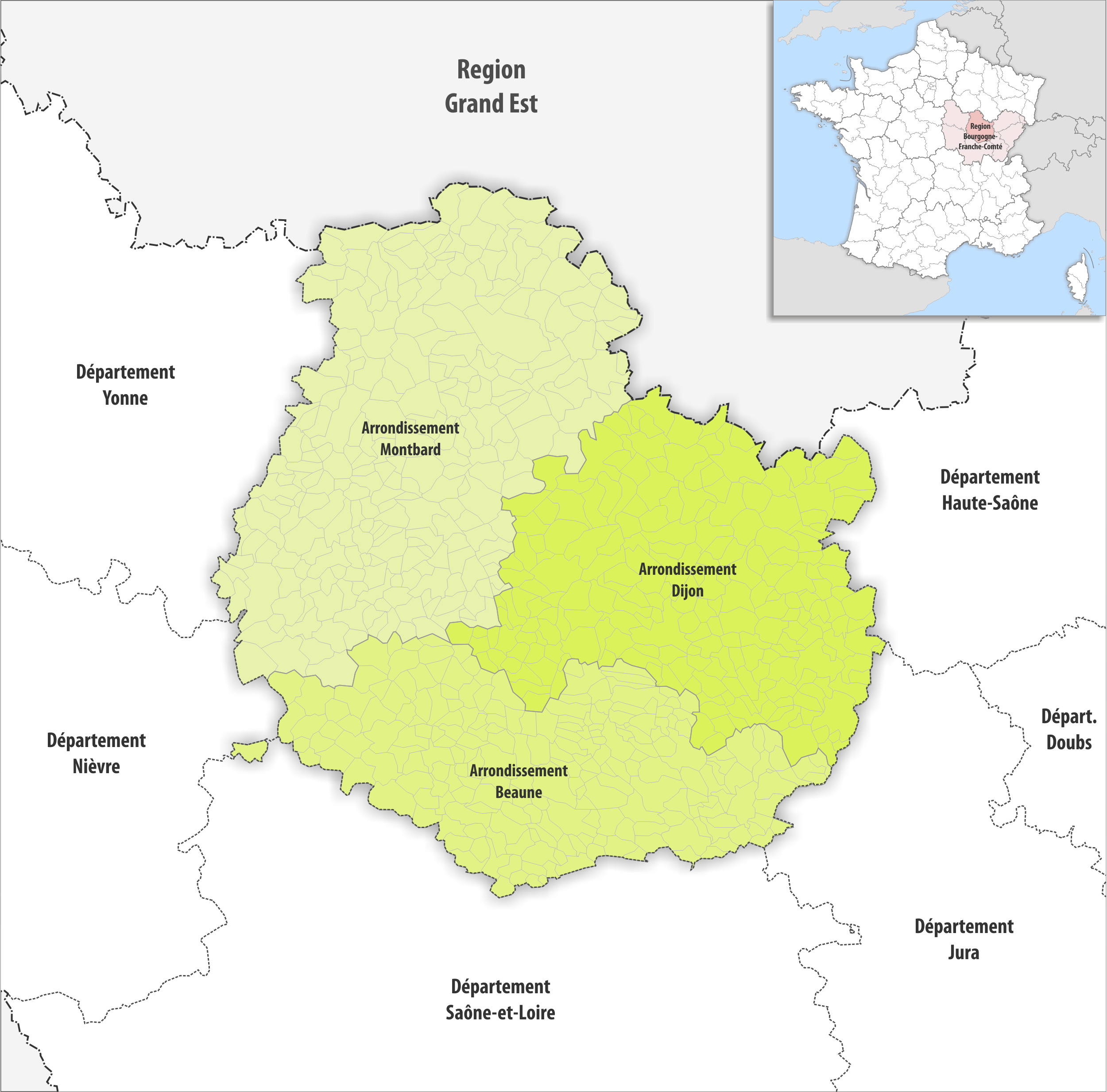
Map of arrondissements of the Côte-d'Or department.

The 3 arrondissements of the Côte-d'Or department are:

1. Arrondissement of Beaune, (subprefecture: Beaune) with 222 communes. The population of the arrondissement was 109,089 in 2021.
2. Arrondissement of Dijon, (prefecture of the Côte-d'Or department: Dijon) with 224 communes. The population of the arrondissement was 368,440 in 2021.
3. Arrondissement of Montbard, (subprefecture: Montbard) with 252 communes. The population of the arrondissement was 57,974 in 2021.

== History ==
In 1800 the arrondissements of Dijon, Beaune, Châtillon-sur-Seine and Semur-en-Auxois were established. In 1926 the arrondissement of Châtillon-sur-Seine was disbanded, and Montbard replaced Semur-en-Auxois as subprefecture. In January 2017 31 communes that were previously part of the arrondissement of Dijon were assigned to the arrondissement of Beaune.
