= Aggie Beynon =

Canadian metalsmith

- Education: University of Waterloo
- Occupation: Metalsmith

Aggie Beynon RCA is a Canadian metalsmith based in Waterloo, Ontario. She is noted for her technique of compressing metal powder to create jewellery.

Benyon graduated from the University of Waterloo in 1975. She developed a patented process for powder metallurgy. She co-owns the Harbinger Gallery in Waterloo, Ontario and was inducted into the Royal Canadian Academy of Arts in 2007.

== Exhibitions ==
- "Aggie Beynon, Wabi: Imperfect Beauty" Robert Langen Gallery, Waterloo, Ontario, March 30-April 30, 2005
- "Canadian National Exhibition" Toronto, Canada, August 13-September 1, 1986
