= Agger Valley Railway =

Agger Valley Railway (Aggertalbahn) is the established name of two railway lines in the German state of North Rhine-Westphalia:

- Siegburg–Olpe railway, the historic Agger Valley Railway that is now only open between Overath and Dieringhausen
- Cologne-Kalk–Overath railway, which extended the above-mentioned line in 1910 in order to provide a direct link from Cologne and which then left the valley of the Agger river
