= Eggen (surname) =

Eggen is a Norwegian surname. Notable people with the surname include:

- Arne Eggen (1881–1955), Norwegian composer and organist
- Arnljot Eggen (1923–2009), Norwegian poet
- Dan Eggen (born 1970), Norwegian footballer
- David Eggen (born 1962), Canadian politician
- Eystein Eggen (1944–2010), Norwegian author laureate
- Gjermund Eggen (1941–2019), Norwegian cross country skier
- Jo Eggen (born 1952), Norwegian Contemporary poet
- Knut Torbjørn Eggen (1960–2012), Norwegian football coach
- Nils Arne Eggen (1941–2022), Norwegian football coach
- Olin J. Eggen (1919–1998), American astronomer
- Torgrim Eggen (born 1958), Norwegian author
- Vegar Eggen Hedenstad (born 1991), Norwegian football defender
