= Agenzia Giornalistica Italia =

Italian news agency

AGI
- Native name: Agenzia Giornalistica Italia
- Founded: 1950; 76 years ago
- Headquarters: Rome, Italy
- Owner: Eni (100%)
- Parent: Eni
- Website: Official website

Agenzia Giornalistica Italia (AGI – Italian Journalistic Agency) is an Italian news agency. It is one of the main news agencies in the country.

== History and profile ==
The Agenzia Giornalistica Italia was founded in 1950. The agency is based in Rome. In its initial phase it had a left-wing political stance. Then the agency became part of Ente Nazionale Idrocarburi (ENI) in 1960. The agency focuses on news about economics and industry.

It has collaborations with the international news agencies, including Associated Press, Dow Jones, and ITAR TASS. It launched cooperation with the Vietnam News Agency in June 2014. With Il Sole 24 Ore and China Radio International has launched AGI China 24, a Chinese news agency in Italian language, mainly for Italian entrepreneurs in China, translating also Xinhua articles and bulletins.
