= Claude Courtépée =

French priest, teacher and historian (1721–1781)

- Born: 23 January 1721; Saulieu, Côte-d'Or, France
- Died: 11 April 1781 (aged 60); Dijon, France
- Occupations: Priest, teacher and historian

Claude Courtépée (23 January 1721 – 11 April 1781) was a French priest, teacher and historian. He is known for his comprehensive geographical and historical study of the Province of Burgundy based on his personal observations and deep research, which is still used as a work of reference.

== Life ==
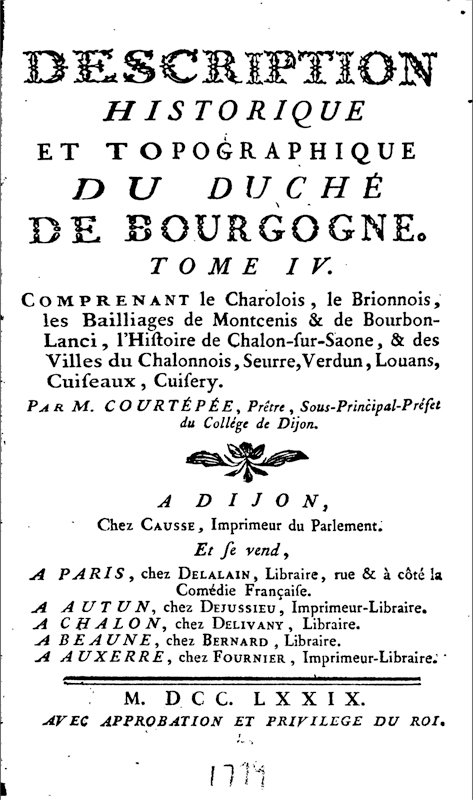

Claude Courtépée was born in Saulieu, Côte-d'Or, on 23 January 1721, the son of a tanner. He studied at the Collège de Saulieu, where he was an excellent pupil. He went on to study law and earned a bachelor's degree at the Faculty of Dijon, then entered the seminary and was ordained a priest. He became a priest in the Diocese of Autun. He was principal of the Collège de Saulieu, then parish priest of Grésigny, Côte-d'Or. He then became sub-principal and class prefect at the Collège des Godrans in Dijon around 1764. He had an affable character and much zeal for the education of youth.

Courtépée had great interest in the history of the province of Burgundy, to which he devoted all his available time, including researches in libraries and travels around the province. His Description générale et particulière du duché de Bourgogne précédée de l'abrégé historique de cette province (Dijon, 1774–85) was a highly esteemed work that was reprinted in 1846–48. Courtépée wrote an abridged version of this work. His writings are generally reliable and are still used as a source. The first volume of his Description générale et particulière appeared in 1774, and the next five appeared in the six years that followed. He also undertook correction of the portable geographical dictionary, Le Vosgien, and provided some notes to the Encyclopédie.

Courtépée provided more than 1,000 geographical articles to the Dictionnaire de Vosgien. He travelled throughout Burgundy, through the hills of Charollais, the plains of Bresse and the mountains of Morvan. He went from village to village noting all the features in his book and consulting documents and educated people about each place. He wrote five accounts of his travels. His account of a journey in 1759 to Besançon, Dole, Seurre and Citeaux was published by the Academy of Besançon. His account of a trip to Troyes in 1759 is a manuscript of the Dijon library. He wrote Remarks of a curious Traveler on the abbeys of Fontenay, Ogny, Val-des-Choux, etc. in 1760. His accounts of two Voyages in the province of Burgundy in 1776 and 1777 were published by the Eduenne Society.

Courtépée had not completed his history when he died in Dijon on 11 April 1781. The 7th volume of his Description générale et particulière was prepared by a friend, and is less complete than the others.

== Publications ==
Publications by Claude Courtépée included:

- Claude Courtépée; Edme Beguillet (1774–1785), Description générale et particulière du duché de Bourgogne précédée de l'abrégé historique de cette province, vol. 1–7, Dijon: L.-N. Frantin
- Claude Courtépée (1777), Histoire abrégée du duché de Bourgogne, depuis les Eduens, les Lingons & les Séquanois, jusqu'à la réunion de la province à la couronne sous Louis XI, Jean-Baptiste Capel, Jacques Causse, p. 408
- Claude Courtépée (1779), Relation du grand prix rendu à Beaune en août 1778, Jacques Causse, p. 122
- Claude Courtépée (1895), "Voyages de Courtépée dans la province de Bourgogne en 1776 et 1777", Mémoires de la Société éduenne, Autun: impr. de Dejussieu père et fils / Anatole de Charmasse: 223
- Claude Courtépée (2001), Fêtes des archers au XVIIIème siècle à Montpellier & Beaune, 1729, 1778, facsimile reproduction, Saint-Égrève: Émotion primitive, p. 122

== Sources ==
- "Abbé Claude Courtépée, historien (1721-1781)", Patrimoine du Morvan (in French)
- Bouillet, Marie-Nicolas; Chassang, Alexis (1842–1878), "COURTÉPÉE (Claude), historien", Dictionnaire universel d'histoire et de géographie Bouillet Chassang (in French)
- Claude Courtépée (1721–1781) (in French), BnF: Bibliotheque nationale de France
- Lagier, Victor (1824), Manuel de l'étranger à Dijon (in French), Dijon
- Société de géographie de l'Ain (1895), "Voyages de Courtépée", Bulletin de la Société de géographie de l'Ain (in French), Imprimerie du courrier de l'Ain
