= Agger (surname) =

Agger is a Danish surname. Notable people with the surname include:

- Alma Agger, Danish singer
- Daniel Agger (born 1984), Danish footballer
- Gunhild Moltesen Agger (born 1945), Danish academic
- Harald Agger (1889–1954), Danish hammer thrower
- Knud Agger (1895–1973), Danish painter
- Mads Agger (born 1999), Danish footballer
- Margrethe Agger (born 1943), Danish textile artist
- Nicolaj Agger (born 1988), Danish footballer
- Poul Agger, Danish sprint canoeist

== Fictional characters ==
- Dario Agger, a character from Marvel Comics

== See also ==
- Steve Aggers (born 1948), American basketball coach
