= Aggas =

Aggas is a surname. Notable people with the surname include:

- Edward Aggas (fl. 1564–1601), English bookseller
- Robert Aggas (died 1679), English painter
