= Gissey-sur-Ouche =

- Commune
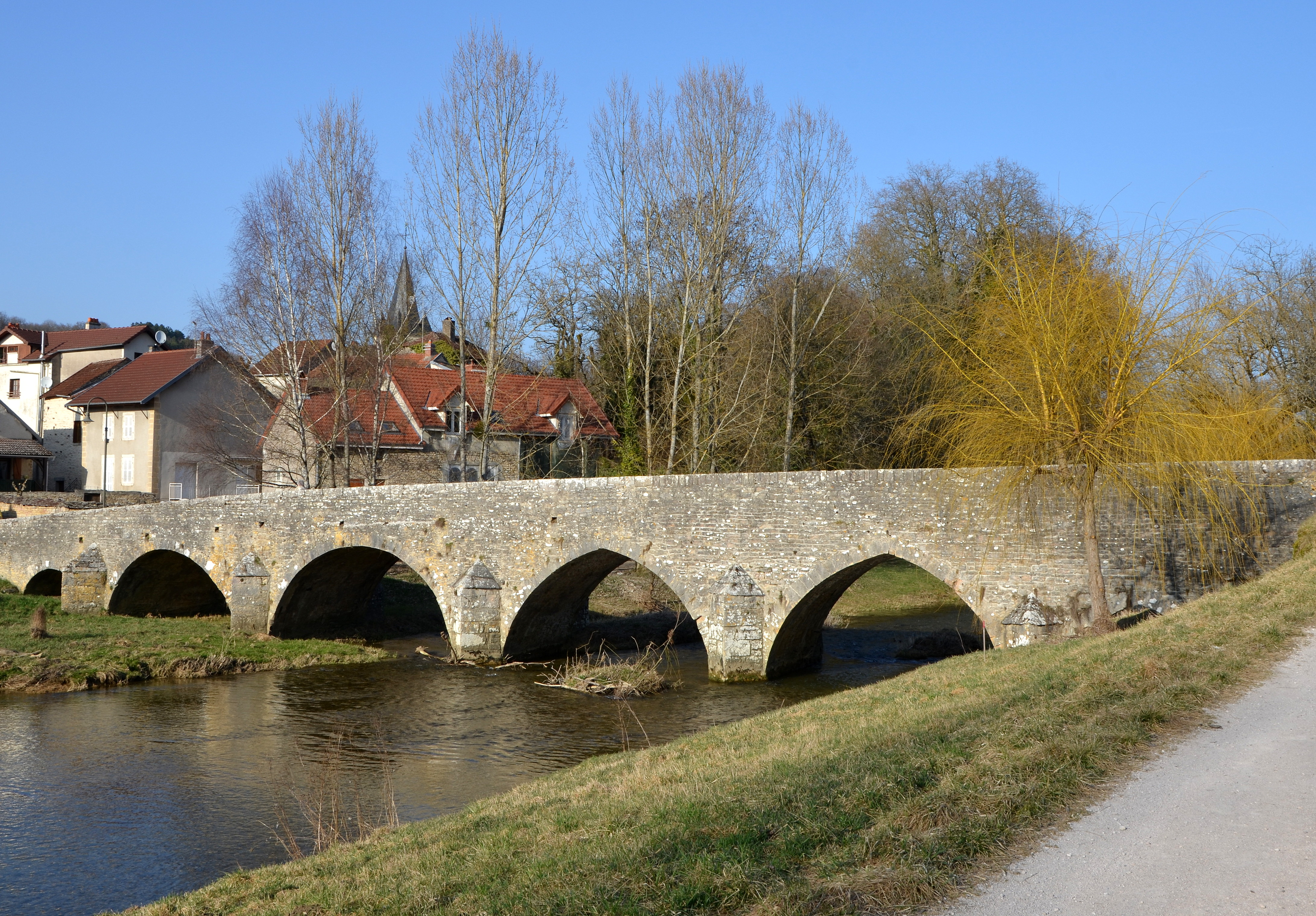
- Bridge over the Ouche

- Coat of arms
- Location of Gissey-sur-Ouche
- Location within France Location within Bourgogne-Franche-Comté
- Coordinates: 47°15′51″N 4°46′06″E
- Country: France
- Region: Bourgogne-Franche-Comté
- Department: Côte-d'Or
- Arrondissement: Dijon
- Canton: Talant

Government
  - Mayor (2020–2026): Jean-Yves Jacquetton
- Area^{1}: 14.48 km^{2} (5.59 sq mi)
- Elevation: 300 m (980 ft)
- Highest elevation: 578 m (1,896 ft)
- Lowest elevation: 287 m (942 ft)
- Population (2023): 362
  - Density: 25.0/km^{2} (64.7/sq mi)
- Time zone: UTC+01:00 (CET)
  - Summer (DST): UTC+02:00 (CEST)
- INSEE/Postal code: 21300 /21410
- ^{1} French Land Register data, which excludes lakes, ponds, glaciers > 1 km^{2} (0.386 sq mi or 247 acres) and river estuaries.

Gissey-sur-Ouche (French pronunciation: [ʒisɛ syʁ uʃ], literally Gissey on Ouche) is a commune in the Côte-d'Or department in eastern France.

== Population ==
Historical population
Year	Pop.	±% p.a.
1968	149	—
1975	180	+2.74%
1982	211	+2.30%
1990	290	+4.06%
1999	303	+0.49%
2007	366	+2.39%
2012	354	−0.66%
2017	354	+0.00%
2023	362	+0.37%
Source: INSEE

== See also ==
- Communes of the Côte-d'Or department
