= Aggar =

Aggar may refer to the following :

- Aggar (city), an ancient Roman town and former bishopric in Byzacena, now a Latin Catholic titular see
- Aggar (film), a 2007 Indian film

== See also ==
- Agar (disambiguation)
