= Maconge =

- Commune
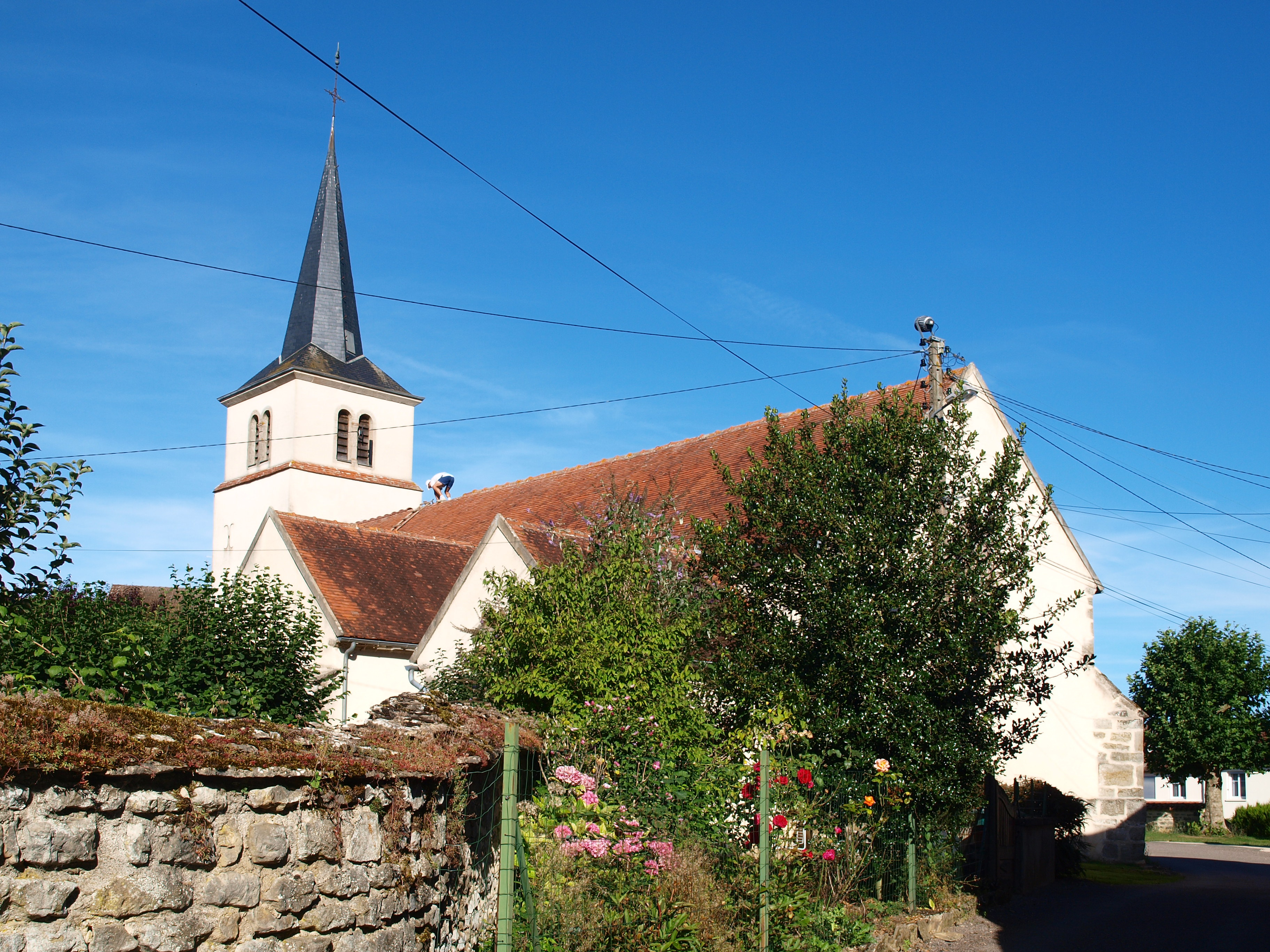
- The church in Maconge
- Location of Maconge
- Location within France Location within Bourgogne-Franche-Comté
- Coordinates: 47°13′17″N 4°34′42″E
- Country: France
- Region: Bourgogne-Franche-Comté
- Department: Côte-d'Or
- Arrondissement: Beaune
- Canton: Arnay-le-Duc

Government
  - Mayor (2020–2026): Denis Timechinat
- Area^{1}: 6.27 km^{2} (2.42 sq mi)
- Elevation: 412 m (1,352 ft)
- Highest elevation: 429 m (1,407 ft)
- Lowest elevation: 370 m (1,210 ft)
- Population (2023): 138
  - Density: 22.0/km^{2} (57.0/sq mi)
- Time zone: UTC+01:00 (CET)
  - Summer (DST): UTC+02:00 (CEST)
- INSEE/Postal code: 21362 /21320
- ^{1} French Land Register data, which excludes lakes, ponds, glaciers > 1 km^{2} (0.386 sq mi or 247 acres) and river estuaries.

Maconge (French pronunciation: [makɔ̃ʒ]) is a commune in the Côte-d'Or department in eastern France.

== Population ==
Historical population
Year	Pop.	±% p.a.
1968	115	—
1975	92	−3.14%
1982	95	+0.46%
1990	76	−2.75%
1999	97	+2.75%
2007	131	+3.83%
2012	143	+1.77%
2017	132	−1.59%
2023	138	+0.74%
Source: INSEE

== See also ==
- Communes of the Côte-d'Or department
