= Agey =

- Commune
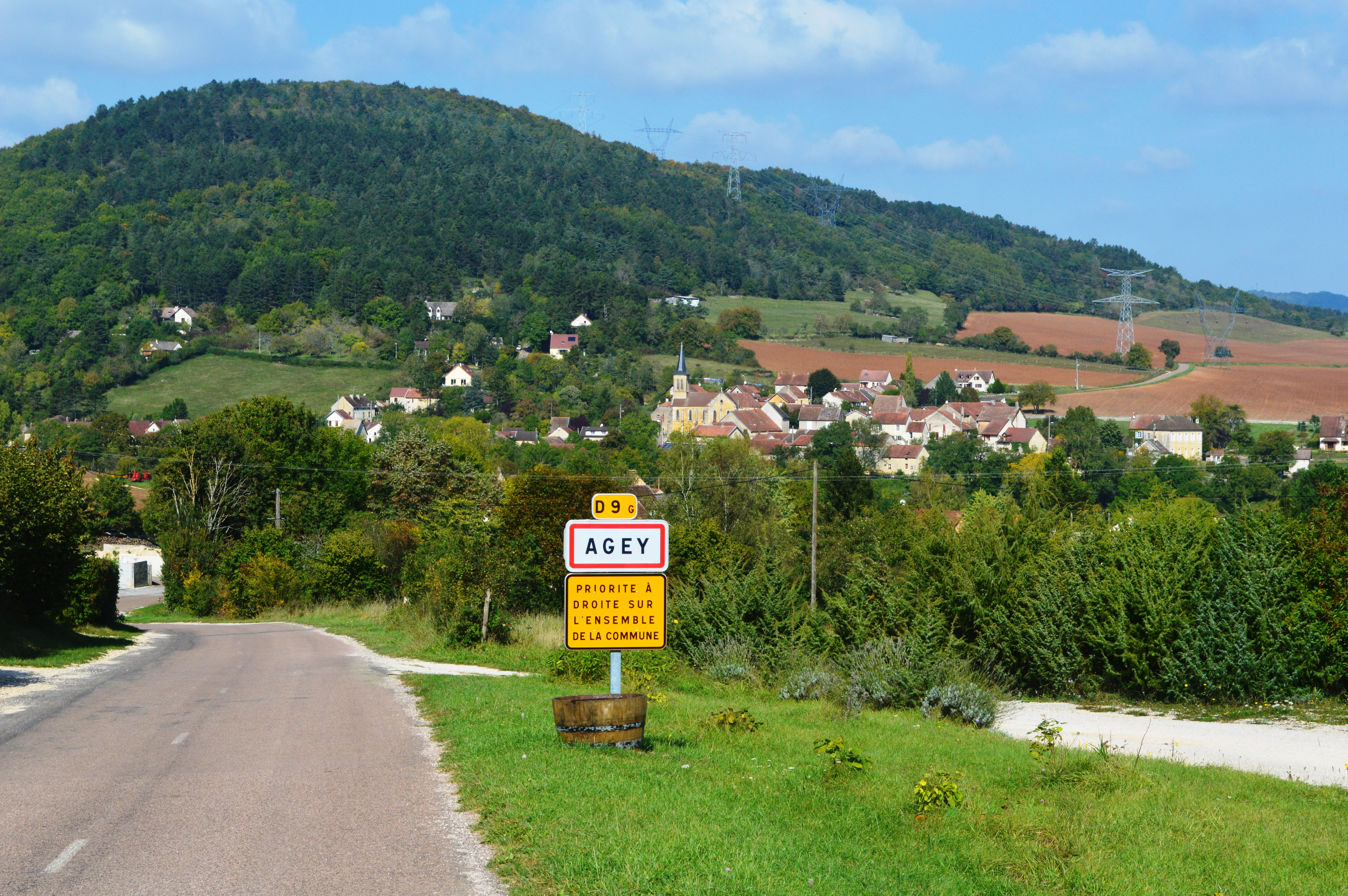
- The road into Agey

- Coat of arms
- Location of Agey
- Location within France Location within Bourgogne-Franche-Comté
- Coordinates: 47°17′06″N 4°45′47″E
- Country: France
- Region: Bourgogne-Franche-Comté
- Department: Côte-d'Or
- Arrondissement: Dijon
- Canton: Talant
- Intercommunality: Ouche et Montagne

Government
  - Mayor (2020–2026): Philippe Chatillon
- Area^{1}: 8.42 km^{2} (3.25 sq mi)
- Elevation: 316 m (1,037 ft)
- Highest elevation: 548 m (1,798 ft)
- Lowest elevation: 289 m (948 ft)
- Population (2023): 265
  - Density: 31.5/km^{2} (81.5/sq mi)
- Time zone: UTC+01:00 (CET)
  - Summer (DST): UTC+02:00 (CEST)
- INSEE/Postal code: 21002 /21410
- ^{1} French Land Register data, which excludes lakes, ponds, glaciers > 1 km^{2} (0.386 sq mi or 247 acres) and river estuaries.

Agey (French pronunciation: [aʒɛ]) is a commune in the Côte-d'Or department in the Bourgogne-Franche-Comté region of eastern France.

== Geography ==
Agey is located some 20 km west of Dijon and 15 km east of Pouilly-en-Auxois. The A38 autoroute passes through the northern edge of the commune from east to west but has no exit. Access to the commune is via the D905 from Sombernon in the west which passes east parallel to and near the A38 continuing to Pont-de-Pany. From the D905 the D9G goes south to the village and continues south to Gissey-sur-Ouche. The D108 comes from Remilly-en-Montagne in the west through the heart of the commune and the village and continues east to Sainte-Marie-sur-Ouche. The commune is heavily forested in the south, north-east and to a lesser extent in the east. About 60% of the commune is farmland.

The Sirene river passes through the commune from west to east following a similar course to the D108 and joins the Ouche river just east of the commune.

=== Geology ===
"There are stones with fossil starfish preserved in limestone ash. When broken in two it reveals the relief of a part with five well-preserved arms. There is a type of stone called burgundy marble, composed essentially of oolites of an earthy gray colour with shells from stony corals as well as oolite marble of an earthy yellow with white dots and white lines due to portions of stone embedded with marine palm leaves and entroques"

== History ==
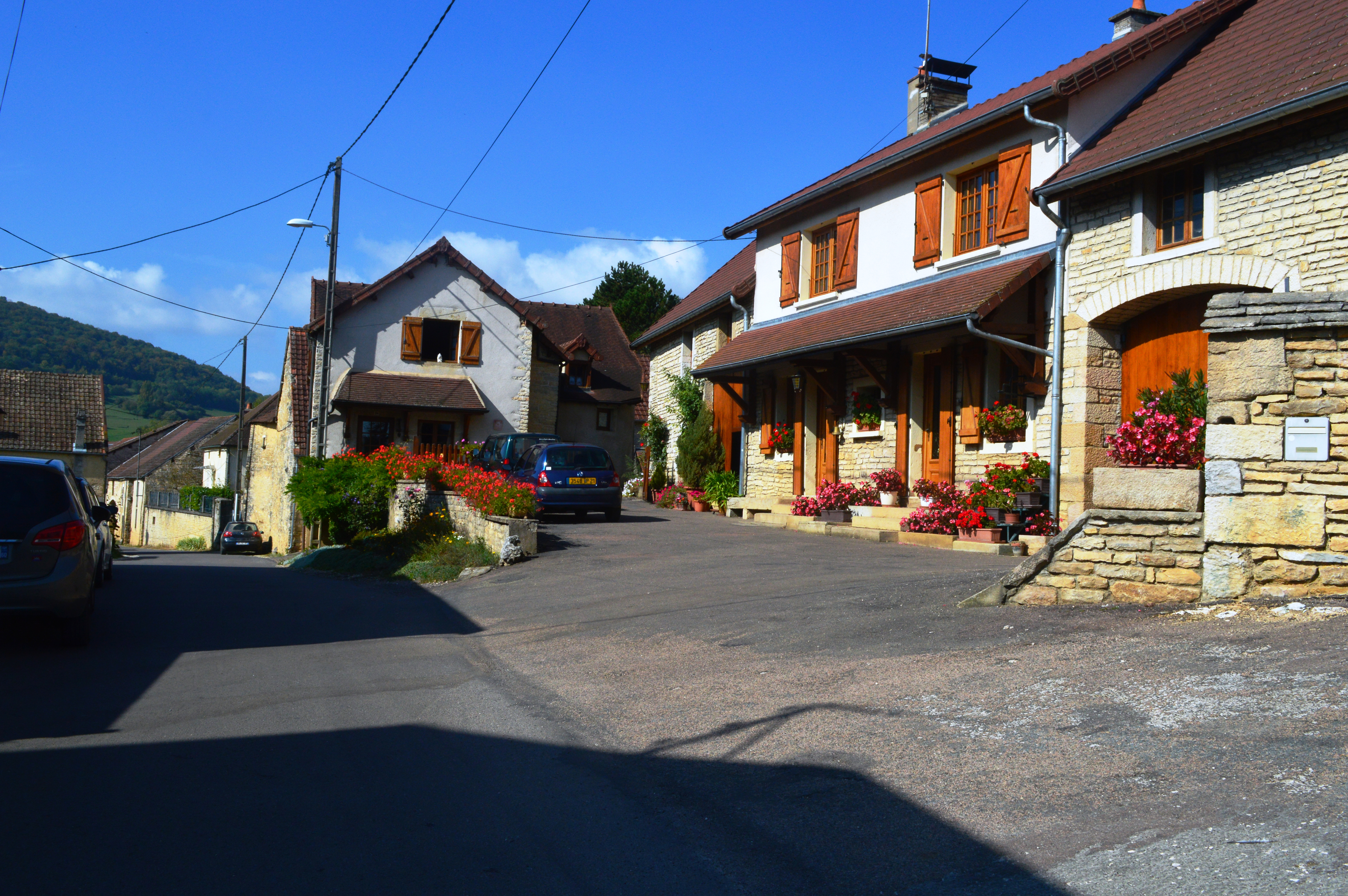
A street in Agey

According to Claude Courtépée the name comes from Ageya or Agia with the final form of the name being adopted in 1574. The village is located along two Roman roads. The Venus Vitrix was discovered by Dufour in 1924 and excavations were carried out under Mont Rond. A second Roman way was discovered between Châteauneuf and Malain. The discovery of the first Roman road was due to Father Chaume. It went from the Mountain of Veluze northwards towards Prâlon and Malain.

Jean Vivant Micault de Courbeton (10 May 1725 - 17 March 1794), President of the Parliament of Bourgogne, Lord of Agey, Barbirey-sur-Ouche, Fleurey-sur-Ouche, Meilly-sur-Rouvres, Maconge, Pommard, Santenay was executed by guillotine in the French Revolution.

=== Heraldry ===
Arms of Agey	The official status of the blazon remains to be determined. Blazon: Azure, a patriarchal cross moline of Argent, in chief Argent charged with three Mounts separated of 3 hillocks Vert.

== Administration ==
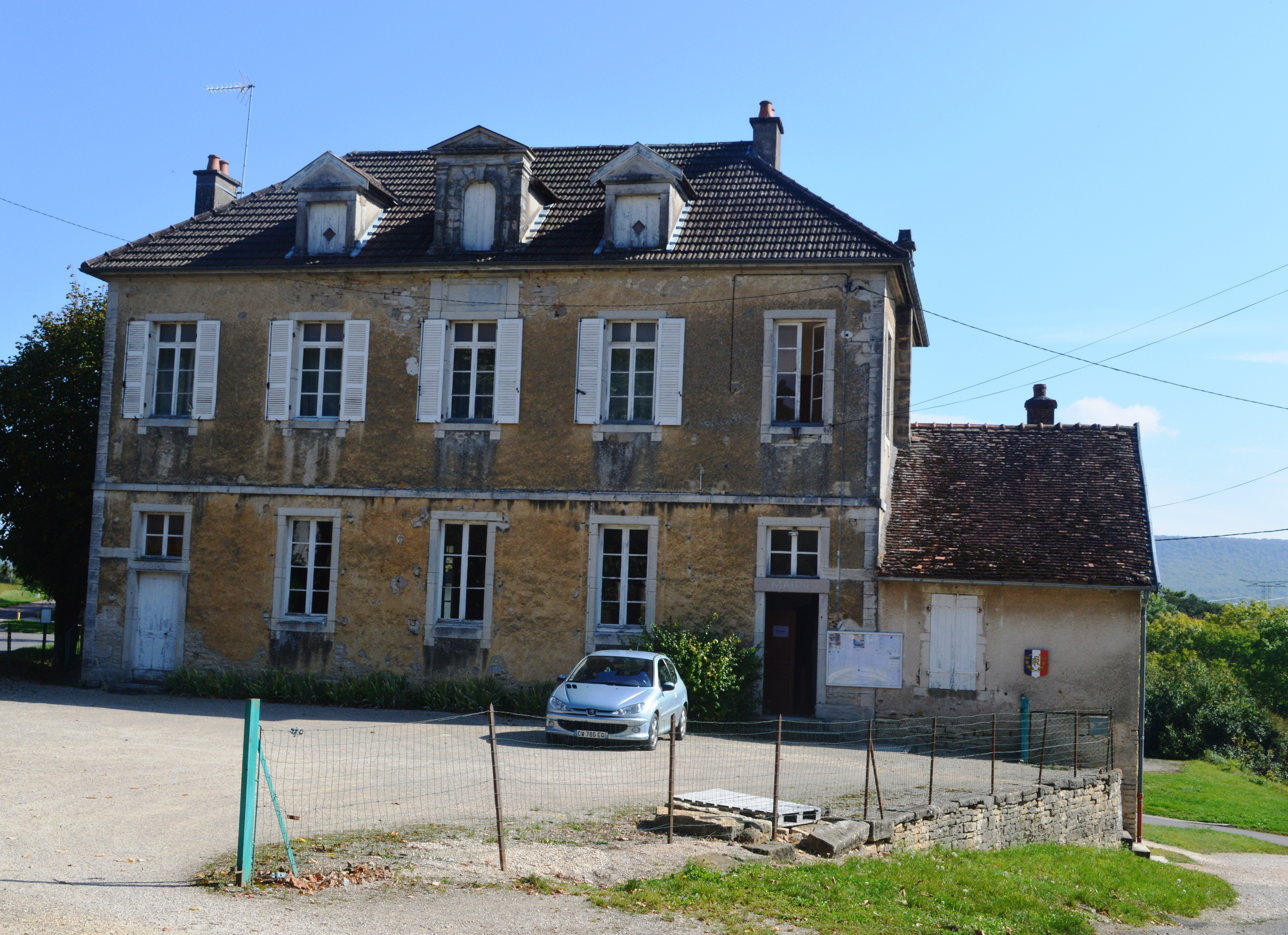
The Town Hall

List of Successive Mayors of Agey

From	To	Name
2001	2014	Martin Dufour
2014	2026	Philippe Chatillon

== Population ==
The inhabitants of the commune are known as Ageysiens or Ageysiennes in French.

Historical population

Year	Pop.	±% p.a.
1793	308	—
1821	424	+1.15%
1846	449	+0.23%
1872	409	−0.36%
1901	322	−0.82%
1926	240	−1.17%
1946	179	−1.46%
1962	154	−0.94%
1968	162	+0.85%

Year	Pop.	±% p.a.
1975	158	−0.36%
1982	152	−0.55%
1990	208	+4.00%
1999	258	+2.42%
2007	270	+0.57%
2012	287	+1.23%
2017	278	−0.64%
2023	265	−0.80%

Source: EHESS and INSEE

== Culture and heritage ==
=== Civil heritage ===
The commune has many buildings and structures that are registered as historical monuments:

- A Farmhouse (1) (18th century)
- A House (1) (1774)
- A Farmhouse (2) (1841)
- A House (2) (19th century)
- A Farmhouse (3) (1609)
- A House (3) (19th century)
- A Farmhouse (4) (18th century)
- A House (4) (19th century)
- A Farmhouse (5) (19th century)
- A Farmhouse (6) (19th century)
- A Farmhouse (7) (19th century)
- A Farmhouse (8) (19th century)
- The Town Hall (1845)
- Houses and Farms (17th-19th century)
- A Chateau (17th century)

There are three privately owned items in the commune which are registered as historical objects:

- A Group Sculpture: Venus and love (3rd century)
- A Chimney (18th century)
- A Statuette: Saint Martha and the Tarasque (16th century)

The commune once had dry-stone huts called cabottes: their remains are found in old vineyard areas. They have been studied by Henri Dufour.

=== Religious heritage ===
The commune has several religious buildings and structures that are registered as historical monuments:

- A Monumental Cross (1869)
- A Monumental Cross (19th century)
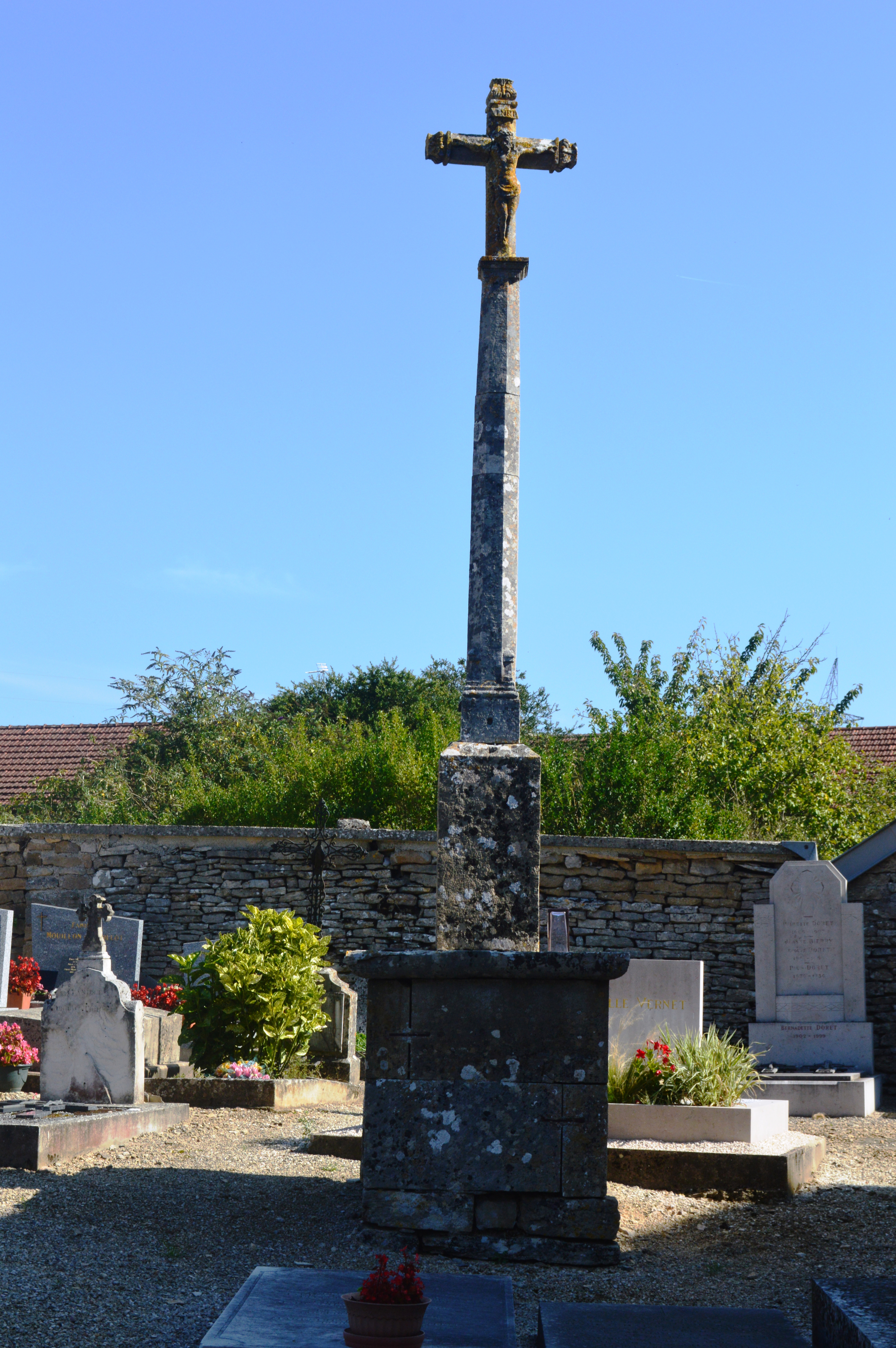
Monumental Cross (1869)

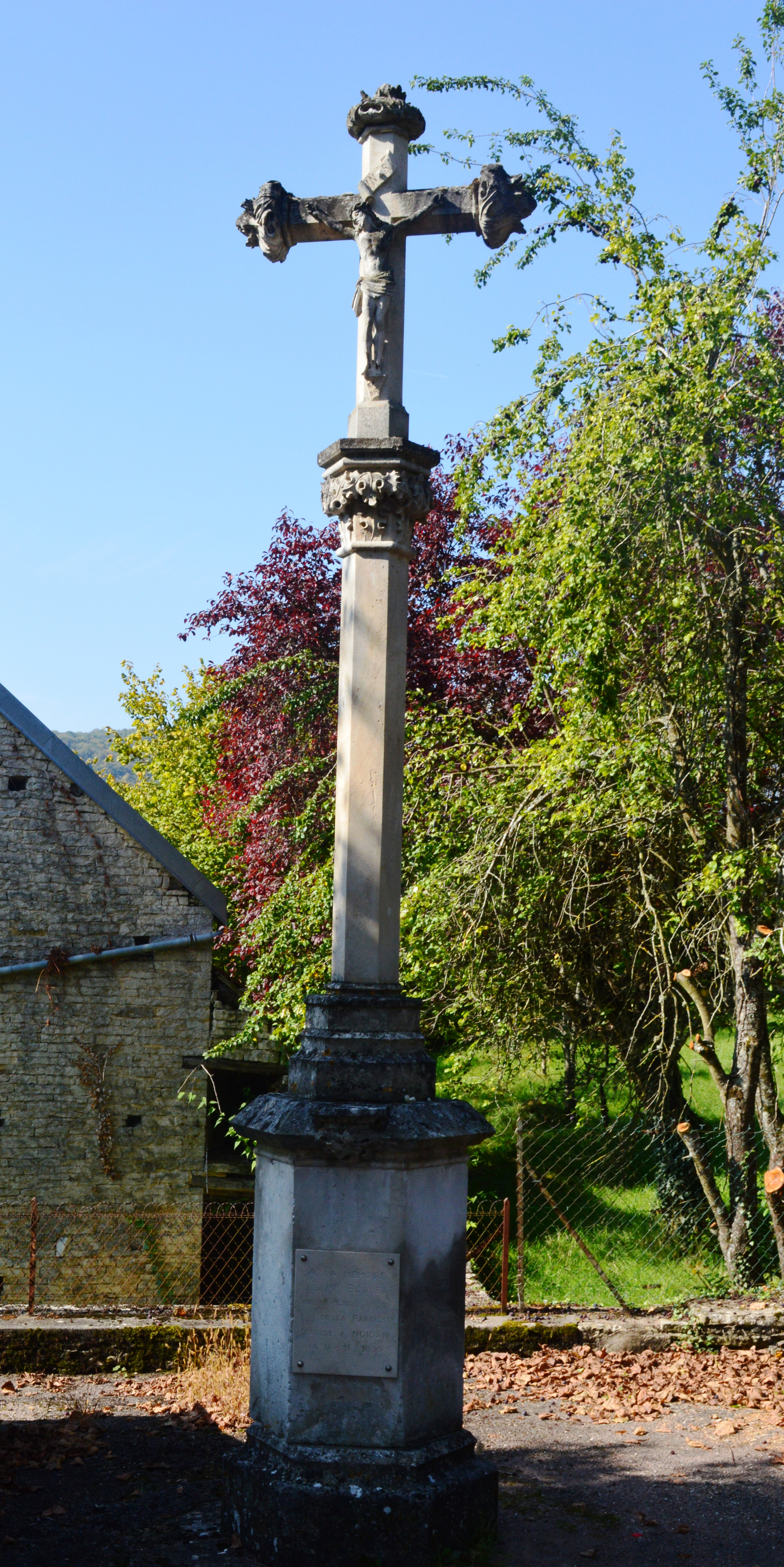
Monumental Cross (1839)

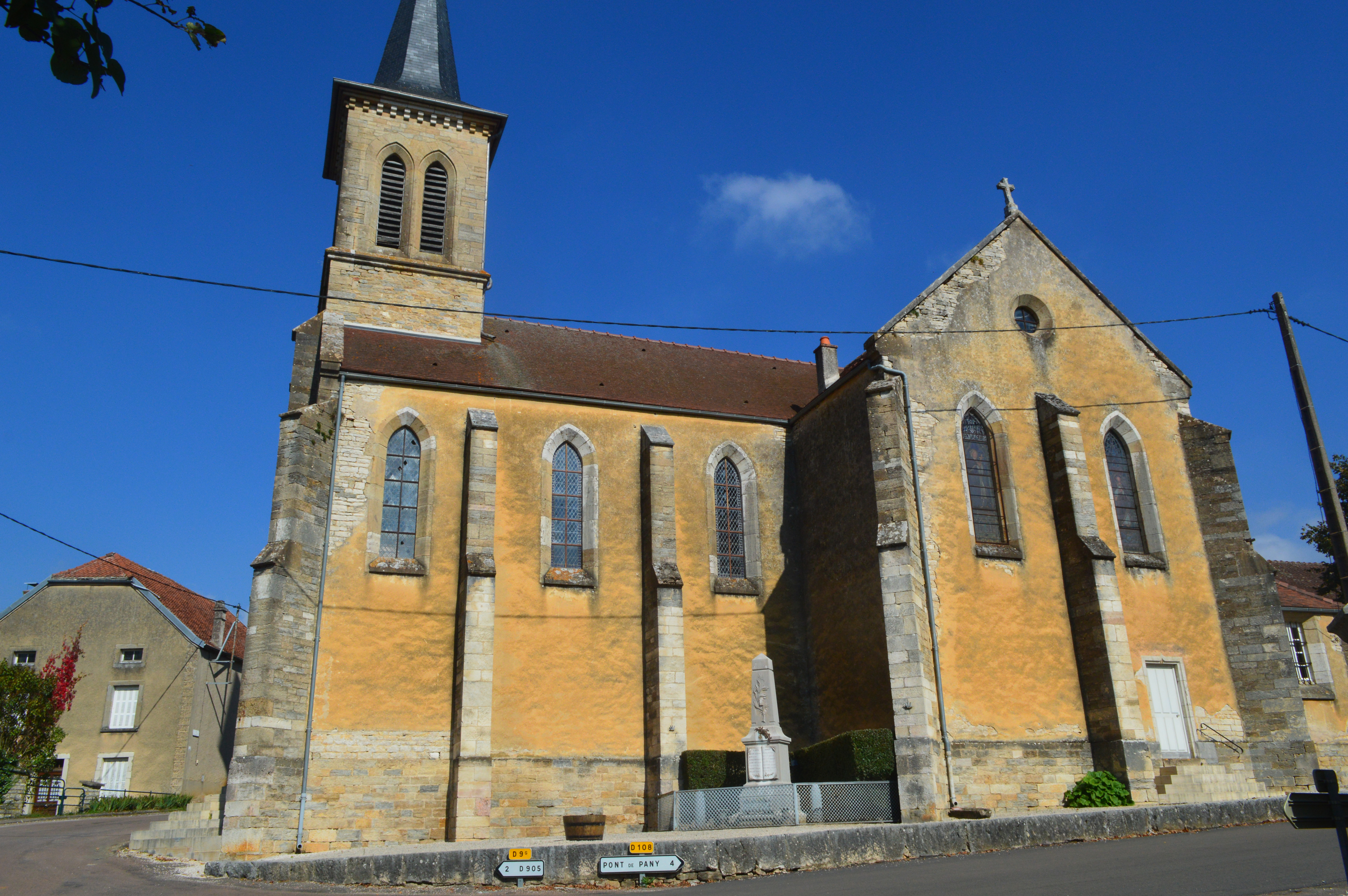
The Church of Saint Martin

- The Parish Church of Saint Martin (19th century). The Church contains many items that are registered as historical objects:
  - A Statue: Saint Bernard (16th century)
  - A Statue: Saint Martin (16th century)
  - A Painting: the Charity of Saint Martin (19th century)
  - A Painting: Saint Michel bringing down the demon (17th century)
  - A Processional Cross (19th century)
  - A Processional Staff: Donation of the Rosary (17th century)
  - A Processional Staff: Saint Martin, of brotherhood (19th century)
  - 7 Stained glass windows (19th century)
  - A Confessional (18th century)
  - A Pulpit (19th century)
  - A Statuette: Saint Catherine of Alexandria (18th century)
  - A Statuette: Virgin and child (18th century)
  - 2 Statues: Saint Martin and Saint Bernard (16th century)
  - An Altar, Retable, and Tabernacle (2) (19th century)
  - An Altar, Retable, and Tabernacle (1) (19th century)

== Notable People linked to the commune ==
- Judith Jeanne-Agey (1593-1673), Abbess of the Abbey of Our Lady of the Assumption at Prâlon
- Jean-Etienne Guettard (1715-1786), academician, stayed at the castle

== See also ==
- Communes of the Côte-d'Or department
- French wine
- Cantons of the Côte-d'Or department
- Arrondissements of the Côte-d'Or department

== Bibliography ==
- Collective work, Agey and Environs Gazette, Ed. Agey Town Hall. (in French)
