= Aggai (bishop) =

Saint Aggai

Apostle of Mesopatamia
- Born: First Century
- Died: First Century; Edessa, Osroene, Roman Empire
- Venerated in: Chaldean Catholic Church; Assyrian Church of the East; Syro-Malabar Church; Ancient Church of the East

Aggai was a 1st-century primate of the Church of the East, and a disciple of Mar Addai, who is believed to have sat from 66 to 81. It was said that Aggai was one of the seventy apostles, and was assigned the East as far as the border of India as his mission field. Mar Addai, the traditional apostle of Mesopotamia, appointed him his successor shortly before his death. Like Addai before him, Aggai preached in various regions of the East.

== Sources ==
Brief accounts of the life of Aggai are given in the Ecclesiastical Chronicle of the Jacobite writer Bar Hebraeus (floruit 1280) and in the ecclesiastical histories of the Nestorian writers Mari ibn Suleiman (twelfth-century), ʿAmr (14th-century) and Sliba (14th-century). These accounts differ slightly, and these minor differences are of significance for scholars interested in tracing the various stages in the development of the legend.

== Life of Aggai ==
The following account of the life of Aggai is given by Bar Hebraeus:

After Addai the preacher of the gospel, his disciple Aggai. This man used to weave Chinese cloth for Abgar, and after the death of his master Addai fled into the East. He began to preach throughout Persia, Assyria, Armenia, Media, Babylonia and in the region of Khuzistan and among the Geles, right up to the borders of India. Then he returned to Edessa, as he was afraid that the faith there might decline, because of the native superstition of Abgar's son, who had succeeded him as king. When he reached Edessa, Abgar's son ordered him to weave Chinese cloth for him as he used to do for his father. Aggai replied to him, 'When my master was feeding the flock of Christ, I used to work for your father. But now the work of feeding has descended to me, and I cannot follow another trade.' The native ruler was angry at his words, and killed him by breaking his leg bones.

According to The Teaching of Addai, Aggai was ordained by Addai to be a bishop of Edessa. Aggai is said to have been murdered in church by one of the sons of King Abgar V of Edessa. Shortly before his death, Aggai is reported to have appointed Palut as his successor.

== See also ==
- List of Patriarchs of the Church of the East

== Notes ==
Church of the East titles
Preceded by Mar Addai	Patriarch of the East; Bishop of Edessa (c. 66–c. 81)	Succeeded by Mari (c. 81–c. 120)
