= AGG =

Agg or AGG may refer to:

== Offices ==
- Attorney General of Georgia
- Attorney General of Ghana
- Attorney General of Gibraltar
- Attorney General of Grenada
- Attorney General of Guam
- Attorney General of Guatemala
- Attorney General of Guyana
- Attorney General of the Gambia
- Auditor-General of Ghana

== People ==
- Alfred John Agg (1830–1886), Australian colonial public servant
- Antonio Gandy-Golden (born 1998), American football player
- Lily Agg (born 1993), Irish professional footballer

== Science and technology ==
- Abnormal grain growth, materials science phenomenon
- AGG (programming language)
- Anti-Grain Geometry, computer graphics rendering library
- Arginine, an amino acid with codon AGG
- Species aggregate, abbreviated "agg."
- Tirofiban, trade name Aggrastat, an antiplatelet drug

== Other uses ==
- Aesthetic group gymnastics, gymnastics in a group
- Arctic Gateway Group, owner-operators of the Port of Churchill and the Hudson Bay Railway
- Art Gallery of Guelph
- Angor language (ISO 639-3 code)
- Angoram Airport in East Sepik Province, Papua New Guinea (IATA airport code AGG)
