= AGI =

AGI or Agi may refer to:

== Organisations ==
=== Companies ===
- Agenzia Giornalistica Italia, an Italian news agency
- Alliance Global Group, Inc., a large holding company in the Philippines
- American Graphics Institute, an American publisher
- Analytical Graphics, Inc., an American provider of space and national defense software Systems Tool Kit

=== Other organisations ===
- African Gender Institute, gender studies institute based in South Africa
- Akademisches Gymnasium Innsbruck, a school, Austria
- Alan Guttmacher Institute, now simply the Guttmacher Institute
- Alliance Graphique Internationale, a group of graphic artists and designers
- American Gamelan Institute
- American Geosciences Institute, formerly the American Geological Institute
- Associazione Guide Italiane (Association of Italian Guides), a former Catholic Girl Scouting association

== People ==
=== Mononyms ===
- Agi, musician Long Kuan, former member of Mika Bomb
- Agi Lamm (Magdalena Agnes Lamm; 1914–1996), known by her pseudonym Agi, Hungarian-Argentine illustrator

=== Given name ===
- Ági Donáth (1918–2008), Hungarian-American actress
- Agi Jambor (1909–1997), Hungarian pianist
- Agi Kassoumi (born 1966), Greek pistol shooter
- Agi Lindegren (1858–1927), Swedish architect and illustrator
- Ági Mészáros (1918–1989), Hungarian film actress
- Agi Mishol (Hebrew: אגי משעול, born 1947) Israeli poet
- Agi Murad (late 1790s–1852), Avar resistance leader
- Ági Szalóki (born 1978), Hungarian folk singer

=== Surname ===
- Anna Pak Agi (1782–1839), Korean Christian martyr
- Sam Agi, ruler of Temasek (ancient Singapore)
- Tadashi Agi (born 1962), Japanese manga artist

== Places ==
- Agi, Iran, a village in East Azerbaijan Province, Iran
- Agi River, a river in Gifu Prefecture, Japan
- Agi Station, a train station in Nakatsugawa, Gifu Prefecture, Japan
- Wageningen Airstrip (IATA airport code AGI), Nickerie District, Suriname

== Science and technology ==
- Adventure Game Interpreter, an adventure game engine used by Sierra On-Line
- Alpha-glucosidase inhibitor, anti-diabetic drugs
- International Geophysical Year (Année géophysique internationale), international scientific project that lasted from 1 July 1957 to 31 December 1958
- Artificial general intelligence, artificial intelligence that can generalize knowledge, transfer skills between domains, and solve novel problems without task‑specific reprogramming
- Asterisk Gateway Interface, a software interface and communications protocol
- Silver iodide (formula AgI), an inorganic compound

== Other uses ==
- Adjusted gross income, in the US income tax system
- Advanced Ground Instructor, a US FAA certificate
- Agariya language (ISO-639: agi), a Munda language of India
- Agi language, a Torricelli language of Papua New Guinea
- Agî, transgender woman, Philippines
- Auxiliary General Intelligence, a spy ship
- Conference on Artificial General Intelligence, an annual conference
