= Acts of Sharbel =

5th-century Syriac Christian martyrdom text

The Acts of Sharbel, or the Hypomnemata of Sharbel, is a Syriac Christian martyrdom text pertaining to a pagan high priest who was martyred for converting to Christianity. The setting takes place at Edessa during the fifteenth year of Roman Emperor Trajan's reign and during the third year of King Abgar VIII's reign but is dated by scholars to the 5th century AD.

== Publications ==
The Acts of Sharbel was first translated into English by William Cureton in his Ancient Syriac Documents (London, 1864). He had used a single manuscript from the British Museum (Brit. Mus. Add. 14, 644). It is written in Syriac and is dated from the fifth or sixth century AD. B. P. Pratten also introduced an English translation to be published in the eighth volume of the Ante-Nicene Fathers (1871). In 1874, Moesinger published a Latin translation in his Acta SS. Martyrum Edessenorum.

== Narrative overview ==
The text begins with the current timeline of Trajan's fifteenth year as the Roman emperor and the third year of King Abgar VIII's rule.

On the eighth day of the new year (Nisan), the populace commenced a celebration and worship of multiple gods. Particularly, the statues of gods Bel and Nebo were placed at the altar centered in the city. The high priest of the gods, Sharbel, was in charge of preparations of the altar. While organizing the altar, a Christian bishopm named Barsamyam had suddenly walked upon the altar to engage Sharbel publicly. Barsamya preached to him and the public, and doing so, Sharbel was greatly astonished by Barsamya's teachings. He converted to Christianity at that very moment.

After Sharbel's conversion, he would later be prosecuted and put to torture until his death by the orders of judge Lysanias. Sharbel's sister Babai caught his blood while he was beheaded. Seeing this, the executioners decide to kill her. The bodies of Sharbel and his sister would later be stolen from the executioners by a group of followers to be buried. The narrative is concluded with a Marinus and Anatolus claiming to have authored the text.

== Composition and historicity ==
Despite the setting taking place during the reign of Trajan, biblical scholars consider the text spurious and date its composition to the 5th century AD. Because of similar historicity, scholars associate the Acts of Sharbel with the Martyrdom of Barsamya and also compare the texts often to more considerable authentic Syriac Christian writings such as the Acts of Shmona and of Gurya and the Martyrdom of Habib in order to determine their textual historicities. In account of the martyrs themselves, Gurya, Shmona, and Habbib's names are present in a Syriac martyrology dated to 411 AD which list names of martyrs from Edessa. Likewise in his Carmina Nisibena, Ephrem the Syrian mentions the others but not Sharbel or Barsamya. Sebastian Brock states that the texts originated from the same group of authors.

The names of Addai's first Christian converts unique to the Doctrine of Addai are also written in the Acts of Sharbel and the Martyrdom of Barsamya. Those names can be found inscribed in former pagan regions of Edessa, dating back to the 3rd and 4th centuries AD and are little found mch in Syriac sources from the fifth century AD or later. Sebastian Brock states that the names were probably genuine ancestral names of those who authored all three texts, however, he doubts their conversion to Christianity. He also states that the names of Addai's first Christian converts mentioned in the Acts of Sharbel and the Martyrdom of Barsamya were written with literary concepts similar to that of the Syriac Christian texts Acts of Shmona and of Gurya and the Martyrdom of Habbib, which he concluded the authors of the Acts of Sharbel and Martyrdom of Barsamya were either inserting the idea that they already had a martyr prior to Shmona, Gurya and Habbib, or were inserting the idea that their pagan ancestors were converted to Christianity at an early period.

== Sources ==
- Attridge, Harold W.; Hata, Gōhei (1992). Eusebius, Christianity, and Judaism. Wayne State University Press. ISBN 9780814323618.
- Burkitt, Francis Crawford (1904). Evangelion Da-Mepharreshe: The Curetonian Version of the Four Gospels, with the Readings of the Sinai Palimpsest and the Early Syriac Patristic Evidence. Cambridge University Press.
- Drijvers, H. J. W. (1980). Cults and Beliefs at Edessa. Brill. ISBN 978-9004060500.
- Lightfoot, Joseph Barber (1889). The Apostolic Fathers: A Revised Text with Introductions, Notes, Dissertations, and Translations. Macmillan Publishers.
- Millar, Fergus (1993). The Roman Near East, 31 B.C.-A.D. 337. Harvard University Press. ISBN 9780674778863.
- Roberts, Alexander; Donaldson, Sir James; Coxe, Arthur Cleveland; Menzies, Allan (1887). The Ante-Nicene Fathers. Buffalo, New York: The Christian Literature Company.
- Valantasis, Richard (2000). Religions of Late Antiquity in Practice. Princeton University Press. ISBN 9780691057514.
