= Martyrdom of Habib the Deacon =

Syriac Christian martyrdom text

The Martyrdom of Habib the Deacon is a Syriac Christian martyrdom text. It pertains to the martyrdom of Habib, a deacon from the village Telzeha. Habib's martyrdom according to the text, occurs during the reign of Licinius. His martyrdom was first only known in an abridged version until a manuscript was discovered in the eighteen-hundreds from a collection of documents stored in the British Museum. The date and reliability of the text is not universally accepted, but Habib's martyrdom is accepted by scholars as having taken place.

== Manuscript history ==
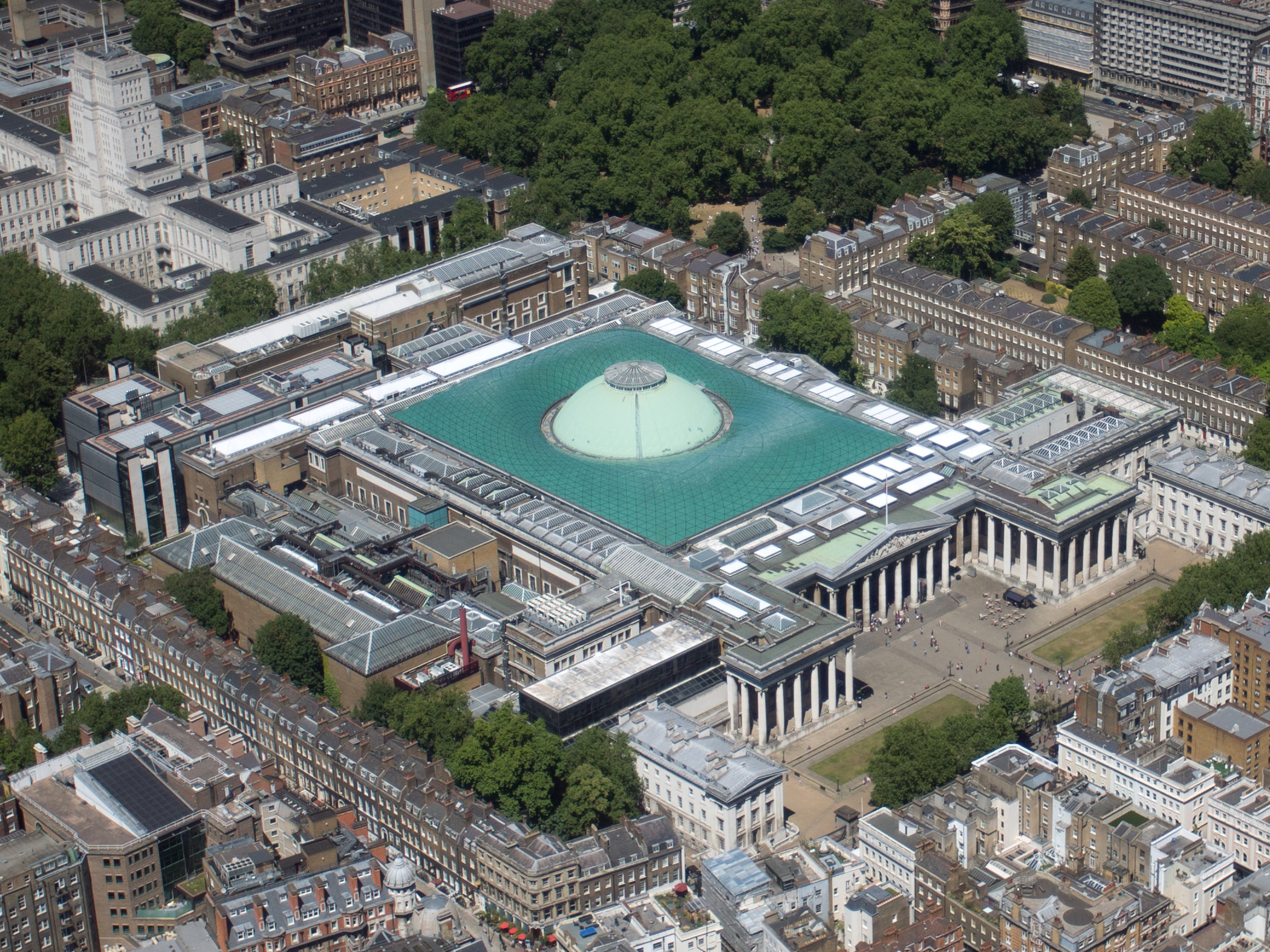
Aerial shot of the British Museum, London

Habib's martyrdom account was first only known in an abridged version written by Symeon the Metaphrast. It was not until 1864 that the manuscript (Add 14645, folios 238b–245a) of the Martyrdom of Habib was edited by Dr. Wright and translated to English by William Cureton in his Ancient Syriac Documents (London, 1864). The manuscript is written in the Syriac language and dated to 936 AD, and was part of a collection of documents obtained by the British Museum from Egypt. The documents though are also part of the archives of Edessa mentioned by Eusebius in his Church History (I. 13. 5). Francis Burkitt published an English translation in his Euphemia and the Goth with the Acts of Martyrdom of the Confessors of Edessa (London, 1913). Ernst von Dobschütz edited the Greek traditions about the martyrdom, and Richard Valantasis would also publish an English translation in his Religions of Late Antiquity in Practice (New Jersey, 2000) by incorporating Francis C. Burkitt's translation together with Ernst von Dobschütz's enumeration.

== Narrative overview ==
The text begins with the reign of Roman emperor Licinius who had commenced repairs to altars of pagan deities everywhere and the worshiping of Jupiter. At the time, Habib who was from Telzeha, encouraged Christians in different villages not to worship those deities. His actions were soon reported to Licinius who ordered a search and execution of Habib. Habib's friends and family were arrested in Telzeha. After, Habib went to Edessa from the village Zeugma to surrender himself to Theotecnus, the caretaker to the governor's home. Theotecnus encouraged him to leave in fear of his life, but Habib refused because he wanted to preserve his salvation. He was then taken to the governor for an extensive trial, then he was imprisoned, tortured, and put to death by being set ablaze. Much of the populace was emotionally distressed about his death. Both pagans and Jews sympathized with him after his death, so they covered his body after.

== Connection with other Syriac texts ==
The Martyrdom of Habib along with the Acts of Shmona and of Gurya are claimed to be authored by a Theophilus who also claims to have witnessed the martyrdoms. Sebastian Brock states that the Acts of Sharbel, Martyrdom of Barsamya, and the Doctrine of Addai originated from the same group of authors. In the Doctrine of Addai, a list unique to the text concerning the names of Addai's first Christian converts who are of nobility are also mentioned in the Acts of Sharbel and the Martyrdom of Barsamya. Inscriptions of these names can be found in once pagan regions of Edessa dating back to the fourth and third century AD and are rarely mentioned in Syriac sources from the fifth century AD and after. Sebastian Brock states that the names were probably genuine ancestral names of those who authored all three texts, however, he doubts their conversion to Christianity. He continues to state that Addai's first Christian converts mentioned in the Acts of Sharbel and the Martyrdom of Barsamya were implemented in the texts with literary concepts from that of the Martyrdom of Habib and the Acts of Shmona and of Gurya. Because of this, Brock concludes the authors of the Acts of Sharbel and the Martyrdom of Barsamya were either integrating the ideal that their pagan ancestors converted to Christianity at an early period, or the upper class of Edessa had a martyr prior to Shmona, Gurya, and Habib.

== Evidence and date of Habib's martyrdom ==
The reliability of the text is not universally accepted. Scholars though acknowledge the occurrence of Habib's martyrdom. Ephrem the Syrian mentions Habib in his Carmina Nisibena (33:13), and relics of Habib were found in Edessa. His name is also written in the Menologion of Basil II, and on a martyrdom calendar manuscript dated to the fourth century AD which list names of martyrs from Edessa. The precise date of the martyrdom is doubted. Francis Burkitt estimated the date of Habib's persecution in 310 AD, a year after Shmona's and Gurya's martyrdom by using draconian measures with the transmitted text. Richard Valantasis though doubts the dates in the text as he points out, the opening sentence places Habib's martyrdom in the Greek year 620 which is 308 AD, four years before Licinius and Constantine the Great were consuls together. Valantasis suggest that Licinius would not have initiated a persecution, as he signed the Edict of Milan with Constantine in 313 AD, seven years before Licinius would actually initiate a minor persecution.

== Bibliography ==
- Attridge, Harold W.; Hata, Gōhei (1992). Eusebius, Christianity, and Judaism. Wayne State University Press. ISBN 9780814323618.
- Coleman-Norton, P.R. (2018). Roman State & Christian Church Volume 1: A Collection of Legal Documents to A.D. 535. Wipf and Stock Publishers. ISBN 9781532666155.
- Efthymiadis, Stephanos (2016). The Ashgate Research Companion to Byzantine Hagiography. Routledge. ISBN 978-1-317-04396-6.
- Heal, Kristian S.; Kitchen, Robert A. (2013). Breaking the Mind. CUA Press. ISBN 9780813221663.
- Saint-Laurent, Jeanne-Nicole Mellon (2015). Missionary Stories and the Formation of the Syriac Churches. University of California Press. ISBN 9780520284968.
- Valantasis, Richard (2000). Religions of Late Antiquity in Practice. Princeton University Press. ISBN 9780691057514.
- Wace, Henry (1911). Dictionary of Christian Biography and Literature. Delmarva Publications, Inc. - Type "Habib" in the left search bar that states "Search in this book."
