= Apocalypse of John the Little =

8th-century Christian text on Islam

The Apocalypse of John the Little is an apocalyptic text supposedly given to John the Apostle by revelation. It is dated to the eighth-century AD and pertains to the rise of Islam. The title includes "the Little" which is in reference to John being the younger brother of James the Great. The text models itself from that of the Book of Revelation and the Book of Daniel and provides some of the cruelest surviving Syriac representations of Islamic dominance. (Note: Penn 2015, p. 147 – "It describes the people of the South as hideous people, womenlike in appearance, who sin against God's creation. They are a defiled people who plunder and enslave all corners of the earth, who hate the Lord's name, and under whose reign the Christians suffer great oppression, especially through the constant demands for tribute.") It is also one of the earliest text alluding to Muhammad by Christians (Note: Penn 2015, p. 147 — "a worrier, one whom they will call a prophet") and possibly one of the earliest accounts of Christians converting to Islam. (Note: Penn 2015, p. 147 — "The phrase I translate as "act like brides and bridegrooms" others have translated as "converted like brides and bridegrooms." The verb in question ('thpk) can have either meaning, and in neither case is the simile particularly clear.") It is one of the Syriac apocalyptic texts.

== Codex Harvard Syriac 93 ==
The Apocalypse of John the Little survives in the incomplete codex Harvard Syriac 93, and by palaeography, J. Rendel Harris dates it to the middle of the eighth-century AD. The codex is from Harris's private collection which Harris numbered as eighty-five (Cod. Syr. Harris 85) and is written in Estrangelo. The leaves are damaged, and Harris had to reconstruct the codex as he had received it with the leaves disorganized. The codex contains a variety of documents such as letters by Jacob of Edessa, an excerpt by Severus of Antioch, a variety of apostolic canons, discussions of individuals who recant their heresy, and an investigation of heavenly entities. After a written series of questions, it is followed up with an eleven-folio collection called the Gospel of the Twelve Apostles with the Revelations of Each of Them with an introduction to the Gospel of the Twelve Apostles followed by the Apocalypse of Simeon Kepha, the Apocalypse of James the Apostle, the Apocalypse of John the Little, and an extract from the Doctrine of Addai. J. Rendel Harris published an edition of these texts in 1900. The Apocalypse of John the Little begins at folio 54r and ends at folio 58r.

== Narrative overview ==
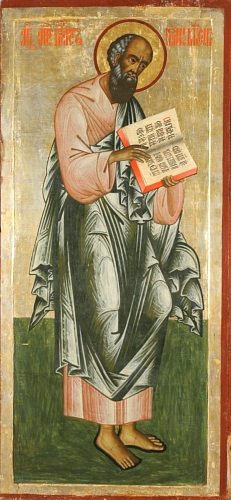
Russian Orthodox icon of the Apostle and Evangelist John the Theologian, 18th century (Iconostasis from the Church of the Transfiguration, Kizhi Monastery

The Apocalypse of John the Little begins similar to that of the Book of Revelation when an angel presents a scroll to John concerning the suffrage of humanity at the eschaton, and a heavenly voice elaborating in detail the eschaton to John. The text also presents its own modified version of Daniel 7 with the rise and fall of its own version of successive kingdoms Media, Rome, and Persia which would be decimated by God because of their sins. The fourth kingdom which the entire narrative will mainly focus on is referred to as the kingdom of the South, and its inhabitants descendants of Ishmael. The fourth kingdom will conquer entire lands as alluded in Daniel 11:5 and plunder, cause drastic taxation, and enslavement. God would eventually be angered by it and send an angel of wrath to cause discord amongst the populace which would then lead to a high-casualty civil war. The king of the North rises against the southern kingdom, but God causes the defeat of the southern kingdom and sends them back to where they came from. When battle is ceased, God destroys the people of the South to the point where they'll never rise again.

== Date ==
The Apocalypse of John the Little is pseudonymous because of the historical events referenced in the text occurred centuries after the first-century AD such as the death of Khosrau II, Constantine the Great, the Islamic conquest, the beginning of the Umayyad dynasty, and the defeat in 692 of Abd Allah ibn al-Zubayr by Abd al-Malik ibn Marwan. It is unknown though the number of years passed from 692 to the composition of the Apocalypse of John the Little. The reference of Ishmael being the father of twelve princes J. Rendel Harris considers to be an allusion to twelve caliphs, and the civil war of the southern kingdom mentioned in the narrative was in reference to the Abbasid Caliphate rising. With that, Harris dates the text to the late 740s and considers the text to be an original holograph. Recent scholarship argues the number twelve referenced to Ishmael fathering twelve princes in the Book of Genesis was more valued by the author for its symbolic importance rather than its historical accuracy, and the details in the Apocalypse of John the Little more accurately correlates to the reign of Abd al-Malik ibn Marwan who died in 705 which most modern scholars conclude the text was composed in the early eighth century.

== Authorship ==
The author of the text is a Miaphysite as the texts Apocalypse of Simon Peter and its polemic against the Church of the East, a tractate by Severus against the followers of Nestorius, and works by Jacob of Edessa who is also a Miaphysite indicate a Miaphysite authorship of the Apocalypse of John the Little. The text is most likely of Edessene origin as J. W. Drijvers and J. Rendel Harris suggest because of the content focusing on Edessa in codex Harvard Syriac 93 such as the works of Jacob of Edessa and the Doctrine of Addai. Edessene authors also commonly use the birth year of Christ 309, a year that early Syriac Christians used. Christ's birth is erroneously dated that year in the Seleucid calendar of the Gospel of the Twelve Apostles, an error pointed out by Harris.

== Eschatology ==
The eschatology of the Apocalypse of John the Little differentiates greatly from that of early Syriac apocalypses concerning Islam. Many previous Syriac authors held onto the traditional Christian interpretation of the schema in the Book of Daniel that the final kingdom of the world which was considered to be the Romans (Byzantine Empire), would oust the Arabs before they could establish a legitimate kingdom. That schema created a primary focus on the Byzantine king in works such as the Apocalypse of Pseudo-Methodius, the world's last Byzantine king, the eschatological figure who'd defeat the Arabs in spectacular fashion and make way for the eschaton. The Apocalypse of John the Little though reinterprets the four kingdoms from the Book of Daniel to be the Persians, Romans, the Medes, and the people of the South. And unlike the Edessene Apocalypse and the Apocalypse of Pseudo-Methodius, the king of the North in the Apocalypse of John the Little does not defeat the people of the South nor pursue them beyond Christian territory. Instead, the text concludes with God sending the people of the South back to their place of origin and not the initiation of the eschaton.

== Bibliography ==
- Harris, James Rendel (1900). The Gospel of the Twelve Apostles Together with the Apocalypses of Each One of Them. Cambridge University Press.
- Penn, Michael Philip (2015). When Christians First Met Muslims: A Sourcebook of the Earliest Syriac Writings on Islam. University of California Press. ISBN 9780520960572.
