= Martyrdom of Barsamya =

5th-century Syriac Christian text

The Martyrdom of Barsamya is a Syriac Christian text. The text is set at Edessa during the reign of Roman Emperor Trajan but is dated by biblical scholars to the fifth century AD.

== Publications ==
Published in his Ancient Syriac Documents (London, 1864), William Cureton translated the Martyrdom of Barsmaya to English from a Syriac manuscript (Brit. Mus. Add. 14, 645) dated to 936 AD. In 1871, B. P. Pratten introduced his English translation to be published in the eighth volume of the Ante-Nicene Fathers. In his Acta SS. Martyrum Edessenorum (Oenoponti, 1874), Moesinger published his Latin translation.

== Narrative overview ==
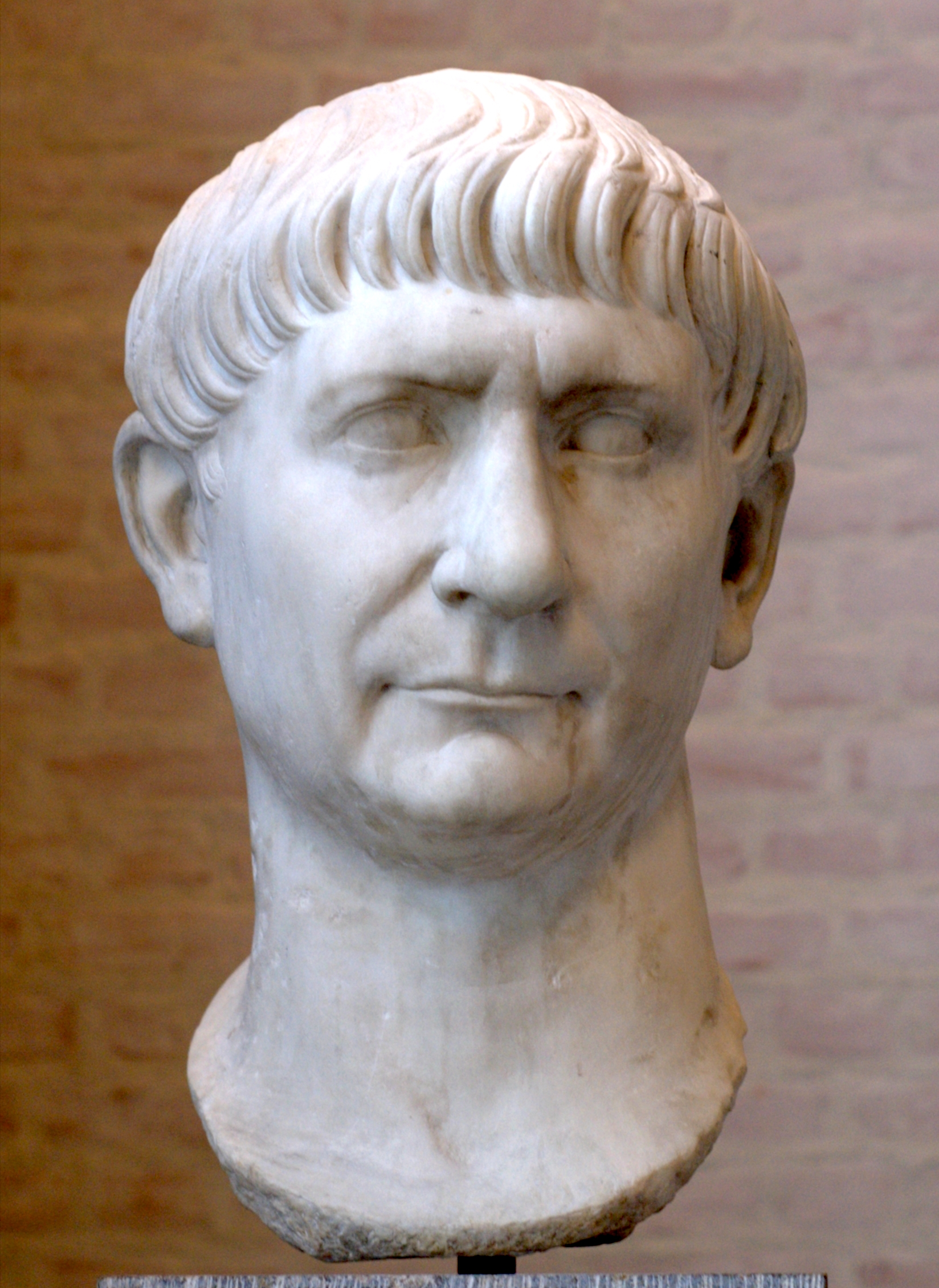
Head of Trajan, from an oversized statue.

In the fifteenth year of Trajan's reign, the Edessan Bishop Barsamya had converted the pagan high priest Sharbel to Christianity. After Judge Lysinas heard of Sharbel's conversion by Barsamya, he ordered the torture of Barsamya. As he was being tortured, letters were sent across the Roman Empire to the high-judicial authorities from the Roman emperor and his proconsul member Lusius with a new decree pertaining to the punishments of Christians according to the laws presented in the decree. Once Lysinas received the letter, he halted Barsamya's torture and had him brought to his court hall. Lysinas read the letter to Barsamya and was set free for not violating the laws according to the decree. Lysinas was relieved of his duties after, and Barsamya continued to live on in Edessa as bishop. The narrative is concluded with a Zenophilus and a Patrophilis claiming to be the authors of the text. By interviewing eyewitnesses Diodorus and Euterpes as their source, Zenophilus and Patrophilis were able to write the text.

=== Trajan's decree ===
William Cureton considers the decree to be the earliest authentic documentation of Trajan respectfully suspending Christian persecution. Cureton also considers the decree to be exactly preserved as if it were written by the notaries of that time. However, Joseph Lightfoot states that Trajan's decree never existed because the Church Fathers neither referenced it, nor alluded anything like it to Trajan. He further suggests that Trajan's attitude towards Christians in his decree was far more respectable than that of Constantine the Great.

== Composition and historicity ==
Scholars have deduced that the work was written in the fifth century AD, after the reign of Trajan it fictionally portrays. Due to similar composition and history, scholars associate the Martyrdom of Barsamya with the Acts of Sharbel. (Note: Lightfoot 1889, p. 69; "Moesinger argues at length in favour of their genuineness.") Both of these texts were found to be less authentic by scholars in terms of historicity than other Syriac Christian works such as the Acts of Shmona and of Gurya and the Martyrdom of Habib the Deacon. In his Carmina Nisibena, Ephrem the Syrian mentions Gurya, Shmona, and Habbib but not of Barsamya or Sharbel. The same reoccurs in the Syriac Martyrology of 411, which lists martyrs from Edessa. Sebastian Brock states that Sharbel, Barsamya, and the Doctrine of Addai originated from the same group of authors.

Unique to the Doctrine of Addai, the exact list of Petrine apostolic succession reoccurs at the end of the Martyrdom of Barsamya. (Note: Attridge & Hata 1992, p. 228; "Addai's second successor, Palut, was consecrated bishop by Serapion of Antioch (190/191-211/212), who was consecrated (a patent anachronism) by Zephyrinus of Rome (198-217), whose priesthood went back to Simon Peter.") Also unique to the Doctrine of Addai, the names of Addai's first Christian converts who are of nobility are mentioned in both the Acts of Sharbel and the Martyrdom of Barsamya. Inscriptions of these names can be found in once pagan regions of Edessa dating back to the fourth and third century AD and are rarely mentioned in Syriac sources from the fifth century AD and after. Sebastian Brock states that the names were probably genuine ancestral names of those who authored all three texts, however, he doubts their conversion to Christianity. He also states Addai's first Christian converts mentioned in the Martyrdom of Barsamya and the Acts of Sharbel were incorporated in a literary writing style similar to that of the Acts of Shmona and Gurya and the Martyrdom of Habbib. With such similarities, he deduced that the authors of the Acts of Sharbel and the Martyrdom of Barsamya were either inserting the ideal that they already had a martyr before Shmona, Gurya and Habbib, or were integrating the ideal that their pagan ancestors were converted to Christianity at an early period.

== Sources ==
- Attridge, Harold W.; Hata, Gōhei (1992). Eusebius, Christianity, and Judaism. Wayne State University Press. ISBN 9780814323618.
- Lightfoot, Joseph Barber (1889). The Apostolic Fathers: A Revised Text with Introductions, Notes, Dissertations, and Translations. London: Macmillan Publishers.
- Millar, Fergus (1993). The Roman Near East, 31 B.C.-A.D. 337. Harvard University Press. ISBN 9780674778863.
- Roberts, Alexander; Donaldson, Sir James; Coxe, Arthur Cleveland; Menzies, Allan (1887). The Ante-Nicene Fathers. Buffalo, New York: The Christian Literature Company.
- Valantasis, Richard (2000). Religions of Late Antiquity in Practice. Princeton University Press. ISBN 9780691057514.
