= Ephraim II =

Ephraim II may refer to:

- Ephraim of Pereyaslavl, Metropolitan of Kiev and All-Rus' in 1091–1097
- Ephraim II of Georgia, Catholicos-Patriarch of All Georgia in 1960–1972
