= Apocalypse of James (Syriac) =

The Apocalypse of James is an apocalyptic work of Syriac literature. It pertains to polemics against Judaism. The text also concentrates mainly on Jerusalem and its future and fortunes.

== Codex Harvard Syriac 93 ==
The Apocalypse of James survives in the incomplete codex Harvard Syriac 93, and by palaeography, J. Rendel Harris dates the codex to the middle of the eighth-century AD. The codex is from Harris's private collection which Harris numbered it as eighty-five (Cod. Syr. Harris 85) and is written in Estrangelo. The leaves are damaged, and Harris had to reconstruct the codex as he had received it with the leaves disorganized. The codex contains a variety of documents such as letters by Jacob of Edessa, an excerpt by Severus of Antioch, a variety of apostolic canons, discussions of individuals who recant their heresy, and an investigation of heavily entities. After a written series of questions, it is followed up with an eleven-folio collection called the Gospel of the Twelve Apostles with the Revelations of Each of Them with an introduction to the Gospel of the Twelve Apostles followed by the Apocalypse of Simeon Kepha, the Apocalypse of James the Apostle, the Apocalypse of John the Little, and an extract from the Doctrine of Addai. J. Rendel Harris published an edition of these texts in 1900. The Apocalypse of James starts at folio 53r.

== Narrative overview ==
The Apocalypse of James briefly alludes to the destruction of Jerusalem by the Romans because it is the adversary against the Crucifixion of Jesus then the text proceeds to an interval. It then proceeds with killing and destruction by a new oppressor who leaves only the wailing alive in the city, but the oppressor eventually dies in war. The text is concluded with a new ruler arriving to build beautiful sanctuaries in Jerusalem and installs a sign to frighten the wicked. The ruler dies after construction is completed then is succeeded by a tougher ruler from his family.

== Textual allusion and date ==
According to J. Rendel Harris, the ruler who has the sanctuaries built is most likely in reference to Constantine the Great, and the sign installed to terrify the wicked is the Christian cross. The emperor prior to Constantine was probably Licinius who is imprisoned and executed after he was defeated by Constantine. Harris dates the text between Constantius II's reign or during the reign of Julian. Harris notes that there is no reason to date the text to Julian's death in 363 AD as the historical element in the text deteriorates prior to his death, and there is no internal evidence suggesting the date could be after the mid-fourth century.
