= Apocalypse of Simeon Kepha =

Apocalyptic text attributed to Peter the Apostle

The Apocalypse of Simeon Kepha is an apocalyptic text attributed to Peter the Apostle. The text mainly pertains to polemics against the Church of the East. Its main characteristic is lamentation over the deterioration of Christian faith in general and allusions to bribed judges initiating persecutions and martyrdoms.

== Codex Harvard Syriac 93 ==
The Apocalypse of Simeon Kepha survives in the incomplete codex Harvard Syriac 93, and by palaeography, J. Rendel Harris dated the codex to the middle of the eighth-century AD. The codex is numbered eighty-five (Cod. Syr. Harris 85) in Harris's private collection and is written in Estrangelo. The leaves are damaged, and Harris had to reconstruct the codex as he had received it with the leaves disorganized. The codex contains a variety of documents such as letters by Jacob of Edessa, an excerpt by Severus of Antioch, a variety of apostolic canons, discussions of individuals who recant their heresy, and an investigation of heavenly entities. After a written series of questions, it is followed up with an eleven-folio collection called the Gospel of the Twelve Apostles with the Revelations of Each of Them with an introduction to the Gospel of the Twelve Apostles followed by the Apocalypse of Simeon Kepha, the Apocalypse of James the Apostle, the Apocalypse of John the Little, and an extract from the Doctrine of Addai. J. Rendel Harris published an edition of these texts in 1900. The Apocalypse of Simeon Kepha starts at folio 51v.

== Narrative overview ==
The Apocalypse of Simeon Kepha makes an assessment on Orthodoxy; it's being isolated as a minority and diminishing from the world because many falsify their allegiance to Christ, speak in an unacceptable manner, and create division amongst Christians. An allusion is then presented against, according to J. Rendel Harris, the Nestorians. Now the Nestorians who claim to be more knowledgeable about Jesus, will gain tribute, pillage, and create many evils that will cause destruction everywhere. The text though is concluded with an ecclesiastical reunion. The unorthodox will return to the original faith and traditions concerning Jesus; they will unify according to the tradition, and those who call on Jesus and love the Paraclete will be saved. (Note: Harris 1900, pp. 17 & 18 — "From this Apocalypse we obtain very little that is in the nature of a historical landmark, beyond the strife between the two sections of the Eastern Church. But we catch the report of hostile movements from without, as well as of misgovernment within; only it is not clear whether the destroying, devastating hosts are Romans, Persians, or Moslems. The conclusion is purely Apocalyptic, and at present there are no signs of the fulfillment of the prophecy that the writer has made.")

== Bibliography ==
- Harris, James Rendel (1900). The Gospel of the Twelve Apostles Together with the Apocalypses of Each One of Them. Cambridge University Press.
- Penn, Michael Philip (2015). When Christians First Met Muslims: A Sourcebook of the Earliest Syriac Writings on Islam. University of California Press. ISBN 9780520960572.
