= January 29 (Eastern Orthodox liturgics) =

Day in the Eastern Orthodox liturgical calendar

Eastern Orthodox liturgical calendar
January 28	January 29	January 30
January 29 O.S. ≍ February 11 N.S. January 29 N.S ≍ January 16 O.S.

An Eastern Orthodox cross

January 29 in Eastern Orthodox liturgical calendars is a feast day and a day of commemoration of saints and martyrs. Although some Orthodox churches use the Revised Julian Calendar and others use the traditional Julian calendar, the fixed commemorations for their respective January 29 are broadly the same, no matter which calendar is used. (Note: Despite the dates being the same, the days to which they refer typically differ by 13 days. The notation Old Style or O.S. is sometimes used to indicate a date in the traditional Julian Calendar (the "Old Calendar"). The notation New Style or N.S, indicates a date in the Revised Julian calendar (the "New Calendar").)

== Saints ==
- Martyr Chryse (ca. 41-54)
- Martyrs Sarbelus (Thathuil) and his sister Bebaia, of Edessa (110) (Note: "At Edessa, in Syria, the holy martyrs Sarbelius and his sister Barbea, who were baptized by the blessed bishop Barsimaeus, and crowned with martyrdom in the persecution of Trajan, under the governor Lysias.")
- Saint Barsimaeus the Confessor, Hieromartyr Bishop of Edessa (114) (Note: Name days celebrated today includes: Varsamis (Βαρσάμης).)
- The Holy Seven Martyrs of Samosata (297):

- Martyrs Romanus, James, Philotheus, Hyperechius, Abibus, Julian, and Paregorius, at Samosata. (Note: (in Greek): Φιλόθεος, Ὑπερέχιος, Ἄβιβος, Ἰουλιανός, Ρωμανός, Ἰάκωβος καὶ Παρηγόριος.)

- Hieromartyrs Silvanus, Bishop of Emesa, Luke the Deacon, and Mocius the Reader (312)
- Venerable Aphrahates the Persian, Hermit of Antioch (370)
- Venerable Ascepsimus, monk. (Note: Eustratiades postulates that this is the same martyr as the Acepsimas venerated on December 7 together with Isidore and Leo.)
- Saint Ashot Kuropalates of Tao-Klarjeti, Georgia (829) (see also: January 27)

== Pre-Schism Western saints ==
- Saint Caesarius, a deacon in Angoulême in France under its first bishop St Ausonius (1st century)
- Hieromartyr Constantius of Perugia, first Bishop of Perugia, and Companions (170) (Note: Constantius, first Bishop of Perugia in Italy, was martyred with numerous members of his flock under Marcus Aurelius.)
- Martyr Sabinian of Troyes (275)
- Martyrs Papias and Maurus, soldiers martyred in Rome under Maximian (ca. 303) (Note: "At Rome, on the Nomentan road, the birthday of the holy martyrs Papius and Maurus, soldiers under the emperor Diocletian. At their first confession of Christ their mouths were bruised with stones and they were thrown into prison by order of Laodicius, prefect of the city. Afterwards they were beaten with rods and with leaded whips until they expired.")
- Saint Valerius, second Bishop of Trier in Germany (ca. 320)
- Saint Blath (Flora), a cook at St Brigid's convent in Kildare where she was honoured as a holy woman (523)
- Saint Gildas the Wise, Abbot, of Rhuys, Brittany (ca. 570)
- Saint Severus (Sulpitius I of Bourges, Sulpicius Severus), Bishop of Bourges (591) (Note: "At Bourges, St. Sulpicius Severus, bishop, distinguished by his virtues and erudition.")
- Saint Dallán Forgaill (of Cluain Dallain), a relative of St Aidan of Ferns, born in Connaught, martyred at Inis-coel by pirates (598)
- Saint Aquilinus of Mediolanum (Milan), martyred by the Arians (650) (Note: "At Milan, St. Aquilinus, priest, who was crowned with martyrdom by having his throat pierced with a sword by the Arians.")
- Saint Voloc, a bishop from Ireland who worked in Scotland (ca. 724)

== Post-Schism Orthodox saints ==
- Venerable Ignatios the Sinaite, of Rethymno, Crete.
- Venerable Laurence, recluse of the Kiev Caves and Bishop of Turov (1194) (Note: See: (in Russian): Лаврентий (епископ Туровский). Википедии. (Russian Wikipedia).)
- Saint Ignatius, Bishop of Smolensk (1210) (Note: See: (in Russian): Игнатий II (епископ Смоленский). Википедии. (Russian Wikipedia).)
- Saint Andrei Rublev, iconographer, of the Spaso-Andronikov Monastery (Moscow) (1430)
- Saints Gerasimus (1441), Pitirim (1455), and Jonah (1470), Bishops of Perm.
- New Martyr Demetrius of Chios, at Constantinople (1802)
- Saint Demetrios Gagastathis (Papa-Demetrios Gagastathis), "Man-of-God", of the St. Nicholas Church in Platanos, Trikala (gr), Greece (1975) (Note: He was formally glorified by the Ecumenical Patriarchate on August 31, 2025. The official communiqué of the Ecumenical Patriarchate was as follows: (in Greek) "Τό ἑσπέρας τοῦ Σαββάτου, ὑπεγράφη ὑπό τῆς Α. Θ. Παναγιότητος, τοῦ Οἰκουμενικοῦ Πατριάρχου κ. κ. Βαρθολομαίου καί τῶν ἁγίων Συνοδικῶν Ἀρχιερέων, εἰς εἰδικήν πρός τοῦτο Ἱεράν Ἀκολουθίαν, ἐν τῷ Πανσέπτῳ Πατριαρχικῶ Ναῷ τοῦ Ἁγίου Μεγαλομάρτυρος Γεωργίου τοῦ Τροπαιοφόρου, ἡ ἐν τῷ Ἱερῷ Κώδικι τῆς Ἁγίας τοῦ Χριστοῦ Μεγάλης Ἐκκλησίας καταστρωθεῖσα Πατριαρχική καί Συνοδική Πρᾶξις Ἁγιοκατάξεως τοῦ μακαρίου Πρεσβυτέρου Δημητρίου Γκαγκαστάθη.") (Note: He was eulogized in 1975 by Abbot Emilianos (Vafidis) of the Holy Monastery of Simonos Petras, as a simple married priest who, he said, "walked among us but his 'association was in the heavens'" [Philippians 3:20].) (see also: January 16 - O.S.)

=== New martyrs and confessors ===
- New Hieromartyrs John Granitov (Note: See: (in Russian): Гранитов, Иван Михайлович. Википедии. (Russian Wikipedia).) and Leontius Klimenko, Priests; Constantine Zverev, Deacon; and with them 5 Martyrs (1920)

== Other commemorations ==
- Translation of the relics (5th century) of Hieromartyr Ignatius the God-bearer, Bishop of Antioch (107)
- Synaxis of All Saints of Yekaterinburg. (Note: See: (in Russian): Собор Екатеринбургских святых. Википедии. (Russian Wikipedia).)

== Icon gallery ==
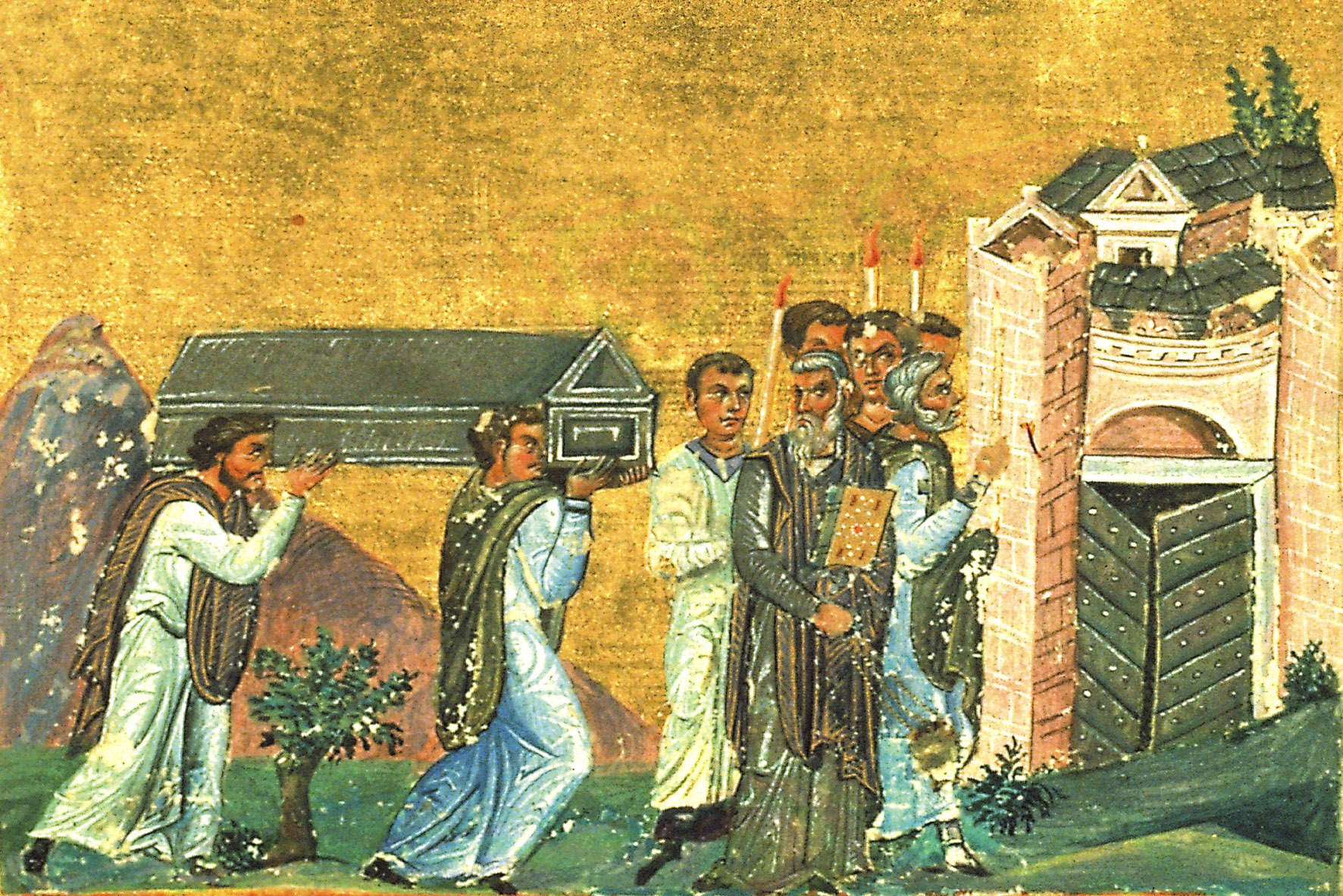
Translation of the relics of Hieromartyr Ignatius the God-bearer, Bishop of Antioch.

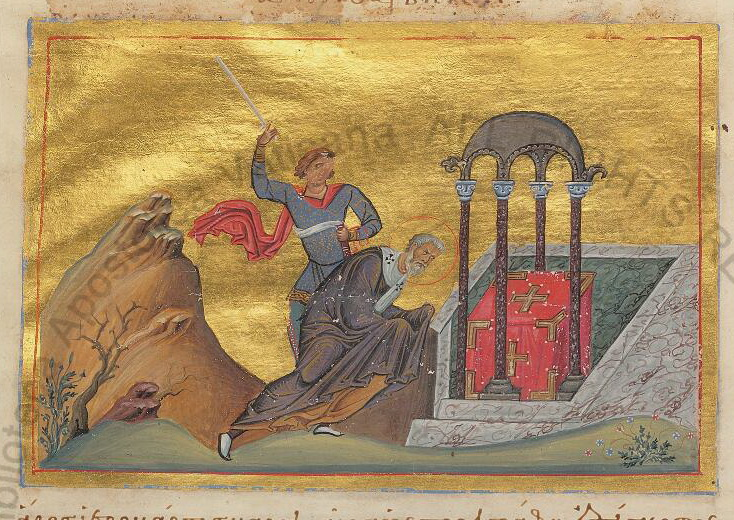
Saint Barsimaeus the Confessor, Hieromartyr Bishop of Edessa.

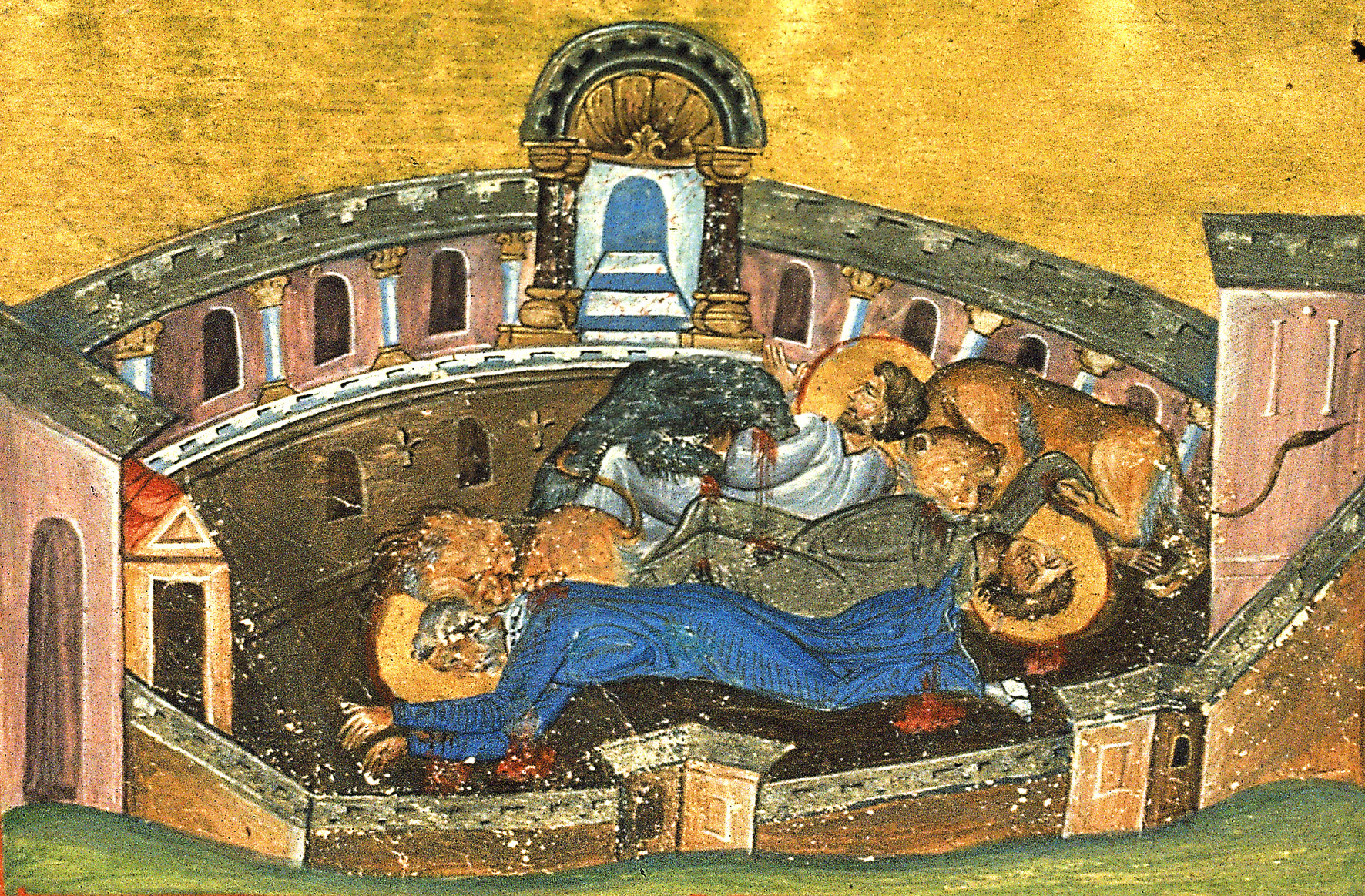
Hieromartyrs Silvanus, Bishop of Emesa, Luke the Deacon, and Mocius the Reader.

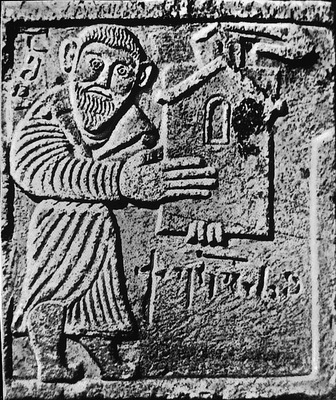
Saint Ashot I of Iberia (Ashot Kurapalates), first Bagrationi King of Georgia.

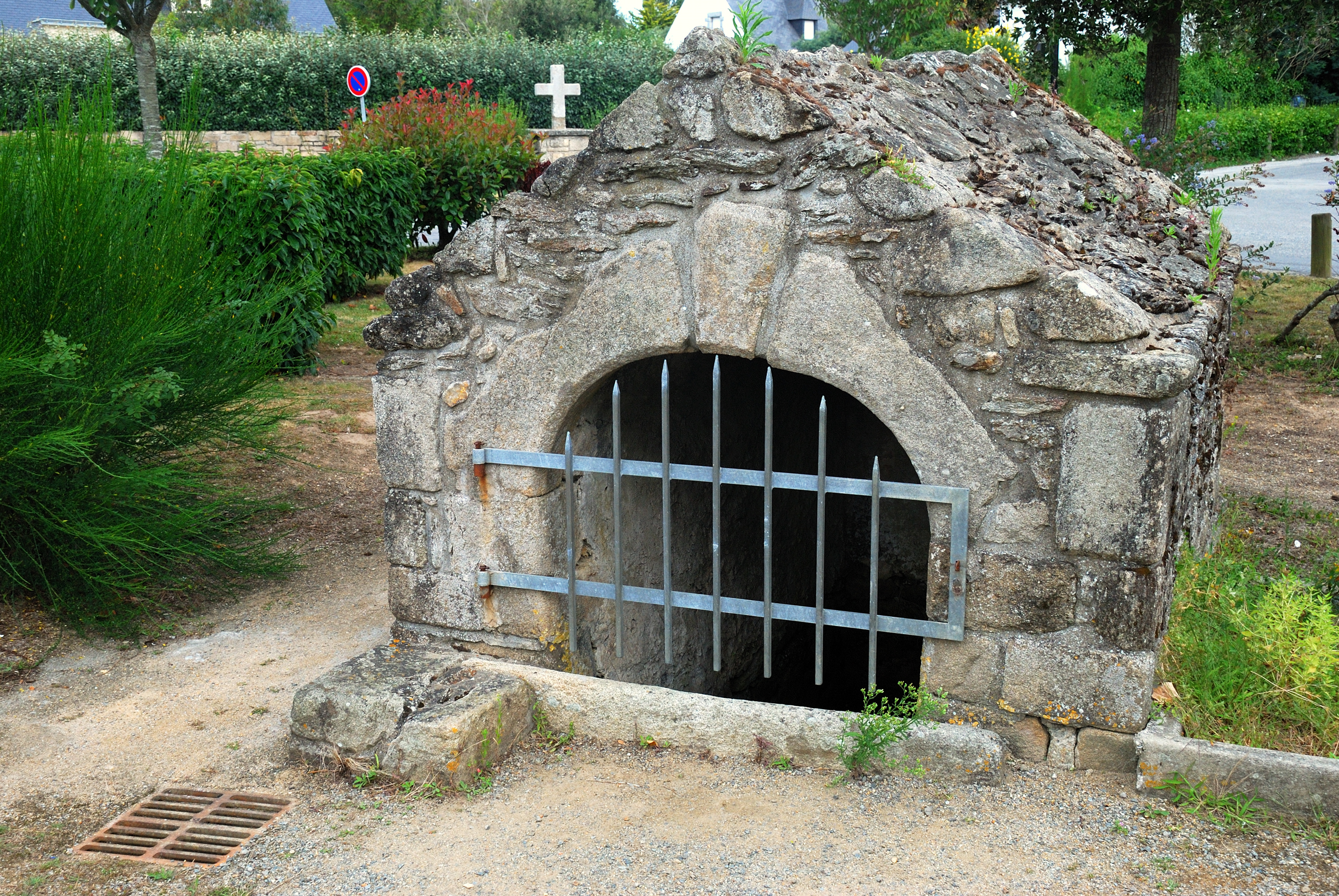
The spring of St. Gildas the Wise in Saint-Gildas-de-Rhuys, Morbihan.

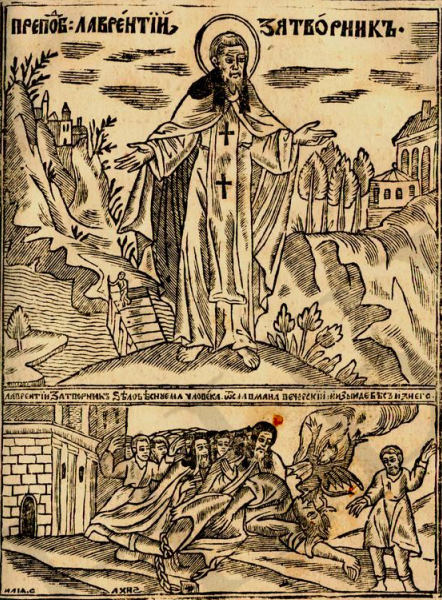
Venerable Laurence, recluse of the Kiev Caves and Bishop of Turov.

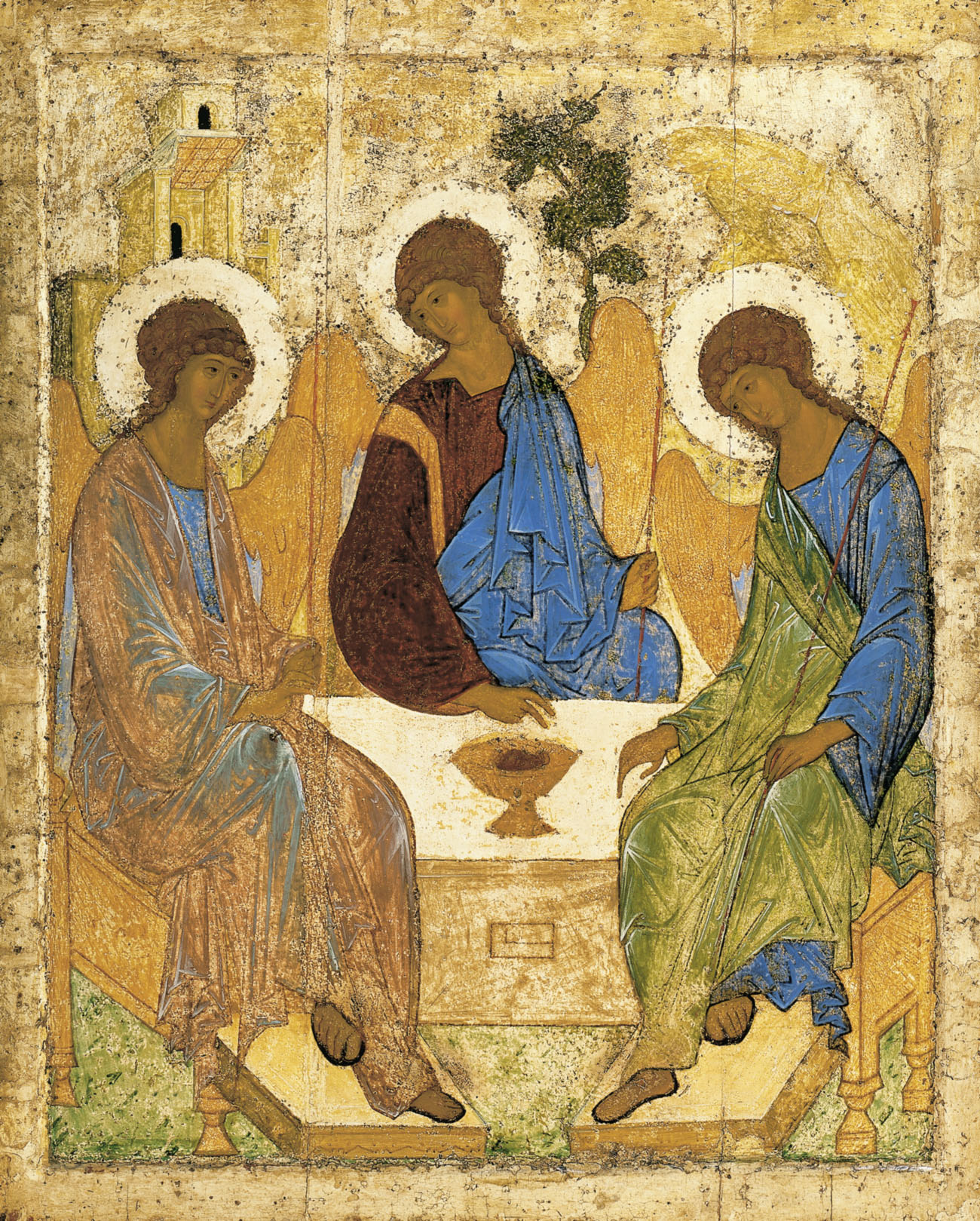
Andrei Rublev's famous icon of the Trinity.

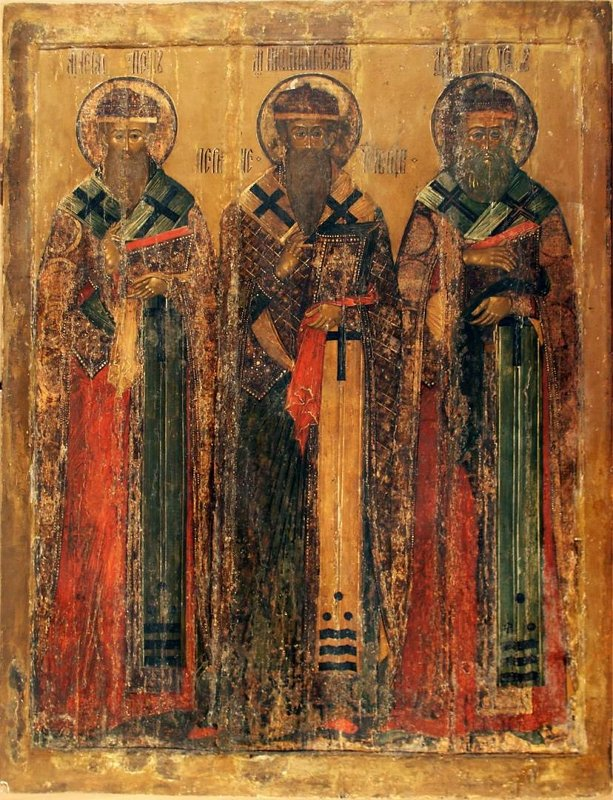
Saints Gerasimus (1441), Pitirim (1455), and Jonah (1470), Bishops of Perm.

== Sources ==
- January 29 / February 11. Orthodox Calendar (PRAVOSLAVIE.RU).
- February 11 / January 29. HOLY TRINITY RUSSIAN ORTHODOX CHURCH (A parish of the Patriarchate of Moscow).
- January 29. OCA - The Lives of the Saints.
- The Autonomous Orthodox Metropolia of Western Europe and the Americas (ROCOR). St. Hilarion Calendar of Saints for the year of our Lord 2004. St. Hilarion Press (Austin, TX). p. 11.
- January 29. Latin Saints of the Orthodox Patriarchate of Rome.
- The Roman Martyrology. Transl. by the Archbishop of Baltimore. Last Edition, According to the Copy Printed at Rome in 1914. Revised Edition, with the Imprimatur of His Eminence Cardinal Gibbons. Baltimore: John Murphy Company, 1916. pp. 29–30.
- Rev. Richard Stanton. A Menology of England and Wales, or, Brief Memorials of the Ancient British and English Saints Arranged According to the Calendar, Together with the Martyrs of the 16th and 17th Centuries. London: Burns & Oates, 1892. pp. 39–40.

Greek Sources

- Great Synaxaristes: (in Greek) 29 ΙΑΝΟΥΑΡΙΟΥ. ΜΕΓΑΣ ΣΥΝΑΞΑΡΙΣΤΗΣ.
- (in Greek) Συναξαριστής. 29 Ιανουαρίου. ECCLESIA.GR. (H ΕΚΚΛΗΣΙΑ ΤΗΣ ΕΛΛΑΔΟΣ).

Russian Sources

- (in Russian) 11 февраля (29 января). Православная Энциклопедия под редакцией Патриарха Московского и всея Руси Кирилла (электронная версия). (Orthodox Encyclopedia - Pravenc.ru).
- (in Russian) 29 января (ст.ст.) 11 февраля 2013 (нов. ст.). Русская Православная Церковь Отдел внешних церковных связей. (DECR).
