= January 28 (Eastern Orthodox liturgics) =

Day in the Eastern Orthodox liturgical calendar

Eastern Orthodox liturgical calendar
January 27	January 28	January 29
January 28 O.S. ≍ February 10 N.S. January 28 N.S ≍ January 15 O.S.

An Eastern Orthodox cross

January 28 in Eastern Orthodox liturgical calendars is a feast day and a day of commemoration of saints and martyrs. Although some Orthodox churches use the Revised Julian Calendar and others use the traditional Julian calendar, the fixed commemorations for their respective January 28 are broadly the same, no matter which calendar is used. (Note: Despite the dates being the same, the days to which they refer typically differ by 13 days. The notation Old Style or O.S. is sometimes used to indicate a date in the traditional Julian Calendar (the "Old Calendar"). The notation New Style or N.S, indicates a date in the Revised Julian calendar (the "New Calendar").)

== Saints ==
- Venerable Ephraim the Syrian (373)
- Venerable Palladius the Hermit of Antioch, Wonderworker (4th century)
- The Holy Two Martyrs, mother and daughter, by the sword.
- Martyr Charita.
- Venerable Saint Isaac the Syrian, Bishop of Nineveh (7th century)
- Venerable James the Ascetic, of Porphyreon (Porphyrianos) in Palestine.
- Saint George Ugryn the Martyr (1015), brother of Ephraim of Novotorzhok
- Venerable Ephraim of Novotorzhok, Abbot and Wonderworker, founder of the Sts. Boris and Gleb Monastery (Novotorzhok) (1053)

== Pre-Schism Western saints ==
- Saint Flavian, a deputy-prefect of Rome, martyred in Civitavecchia in Italy under Diocletian (c. 304)
- Saint Valerius, Bishop of Saragossa in Spain, with whom Saint Vincent served as deacon (315)
- Saint Cannera (Cainder, Kinnera), Virgin recluse on the Isle of Inis Cathaig, Co. Clare and of Bantry Bay, Co. Cork, Ireland (c. 530) (Note: A holy virgin who lived as an anchoress near Bantry in Ireland. She reposed after visiting St. Senan and receiving communion. She was buried on St. Senan's island off Enniscorthy.)
- Saint John of Reomans (John of Reomay (Réomé)), in Gaul (544) (Note: Born in Dijon in France, he became a hermit in Reomay. When disciples gathered around him, he fled and became a monk at Lérins. Here he learnt the traditions of St. Macarius and on his return to Reomay, he and the monastery he founded there lived according to them.)
- Saints Brigid and Maura, daughters of a Scottish Chieftain, Martyrs in Picardy while on pilgrimage to Rome.
- Saint Antimus, one of the first Abbots of Brantôme in France (8th century)
- Saint Glastian, patron saint of Kinglassie in Fife in Scotland (830) (Note: He made peace between the Picts and the Scots.)
- Saint Odo of Beauvais, Bishop of Beauvais (880) (Note: Born near Beauvais in France, he gave up a military career to become a monk at Corbie. In 861 he became a very influential Bishop of Beauvais.)

== Post-Schism Orthodox saints ==
- Venerable Ephraim of the Kiev Caves, Bishop of Pereyaslavl (c. 1098)
- Venerable Theodosius, founder of Totma Monastery, Vologda Oblast (1568) (Note: See: (in Russian): Феодосий Тотемский. Википедии. (Russian Wikipedia).)
- Saints Archilius and Luarsaab.

=== New martyrs and confessors ===
- New Hieroconfessor Theodore, Presbyter (1933)
- New Hieroconfessor Arsenius Stadnitsky, Metropolitan of Tashkent and Turkestan (1936)
- New Hieromartyr Ignatius Sadkovsky, Bishop of Skopin (1938) (Note: See: (in Russian): Игнатий (Садковский). Википедии. (Russian Wikipedia).)
- New Hieromartyr Vladimir Pishchulin, Priest, at Simferopol (1938) (Note: See: (in Russian): Владимир (Пищулин). Википедии. (Russian Wikipedia).)
- New Hieromartyr Bartholomew (Ratnykh), Hieromonk, at Feodosia (Crimea) (1938)
- New Martyr Olga Vasilievna Evdokimova, in the gulag (1938)
- New Hieroconfessor Leontius Stasievich, Archimandrite of Jablechna, Poland, who reposed at Mikhailovsk (Ivanovo) (Russia) (1972)

== Other commemorations ==
- "Sumorin Totma" Icon of the Mother of God (16th century)

== Icon gallery ==
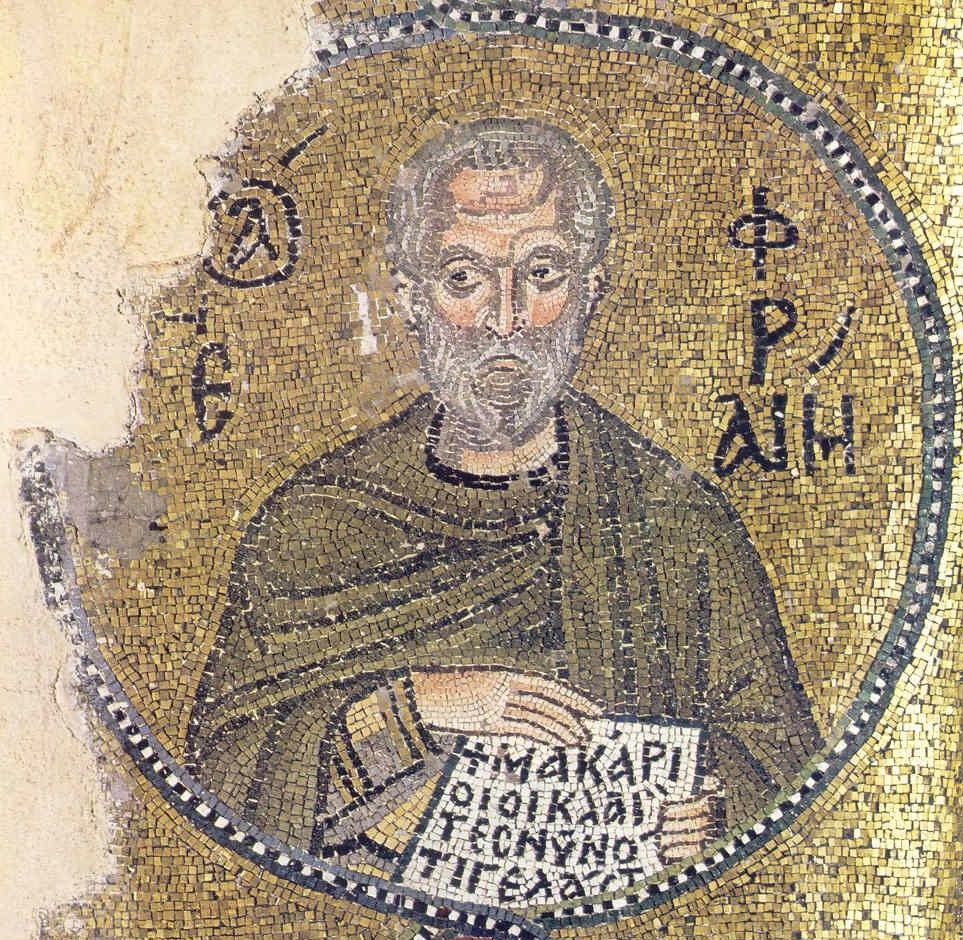
Venerable Ephraim the Syrian.

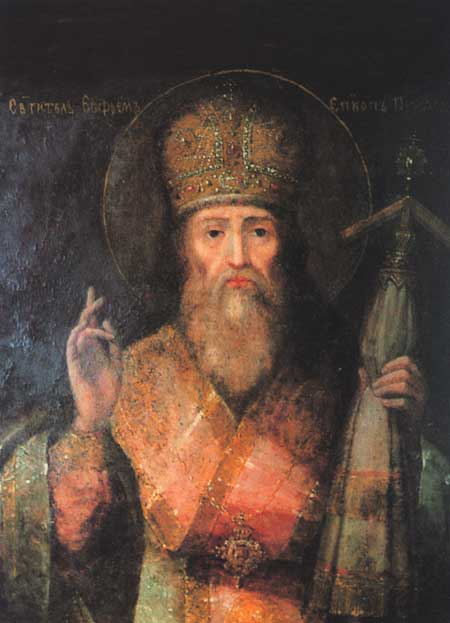
Venerable Ephraim of the Kiev Caves, Bishop of Pereyaslavl.

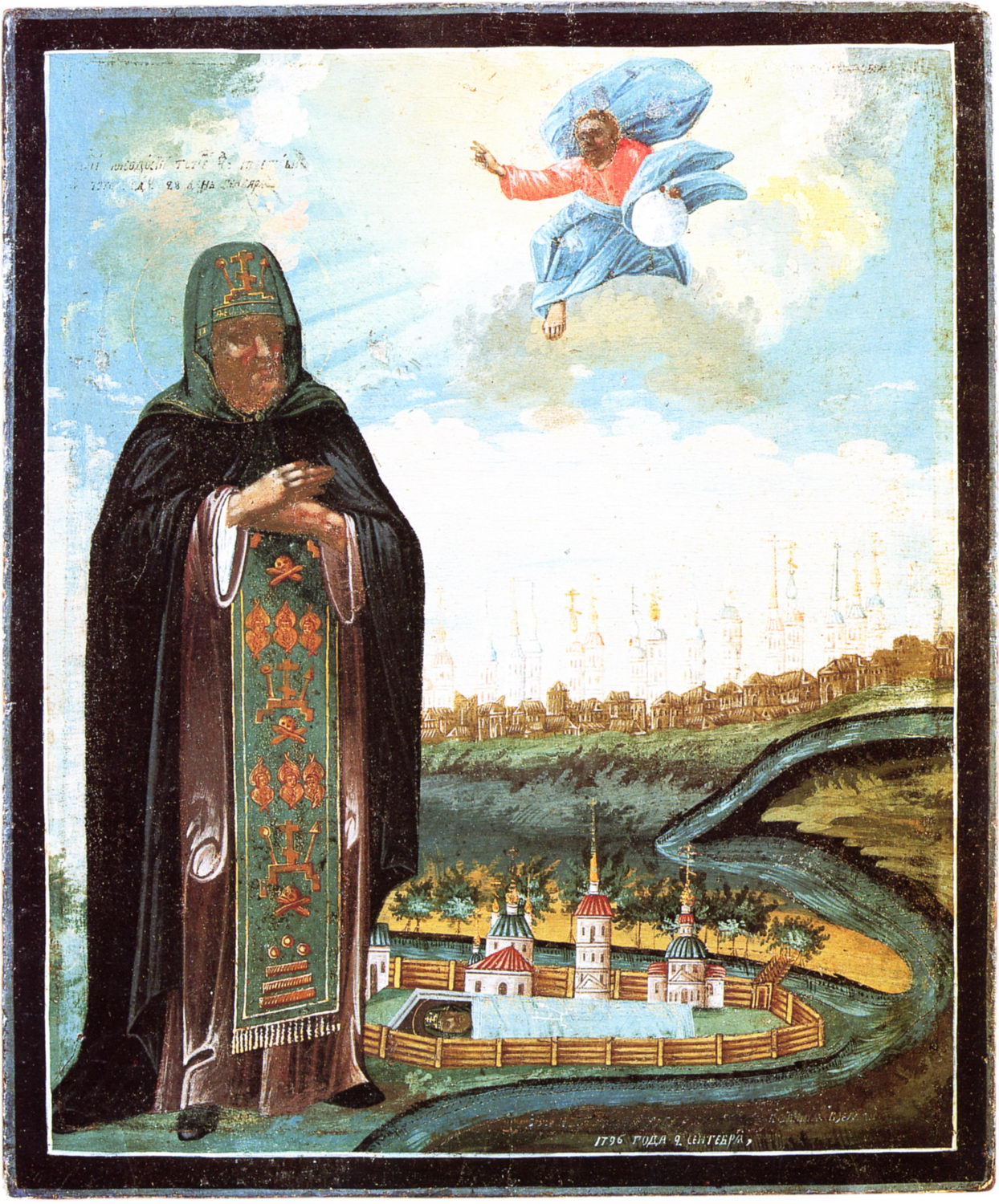
Venerable Theodosius, founder of Totma Monastery, Vologda Oblast.

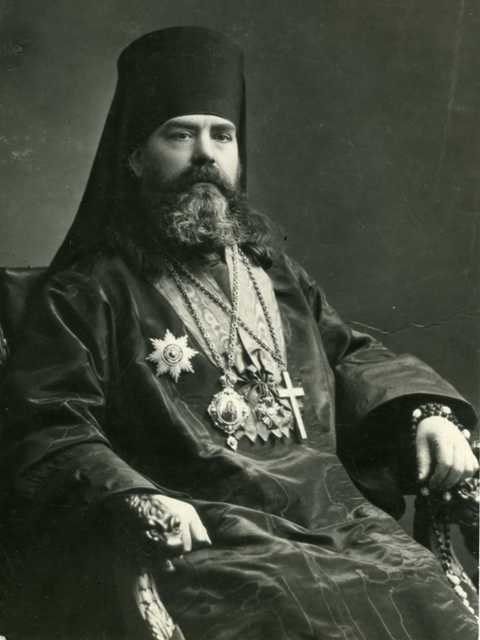
New Hieroconfessor Arsenius Stadnitsky, Metropolitan of Tashkent and Turkestan.

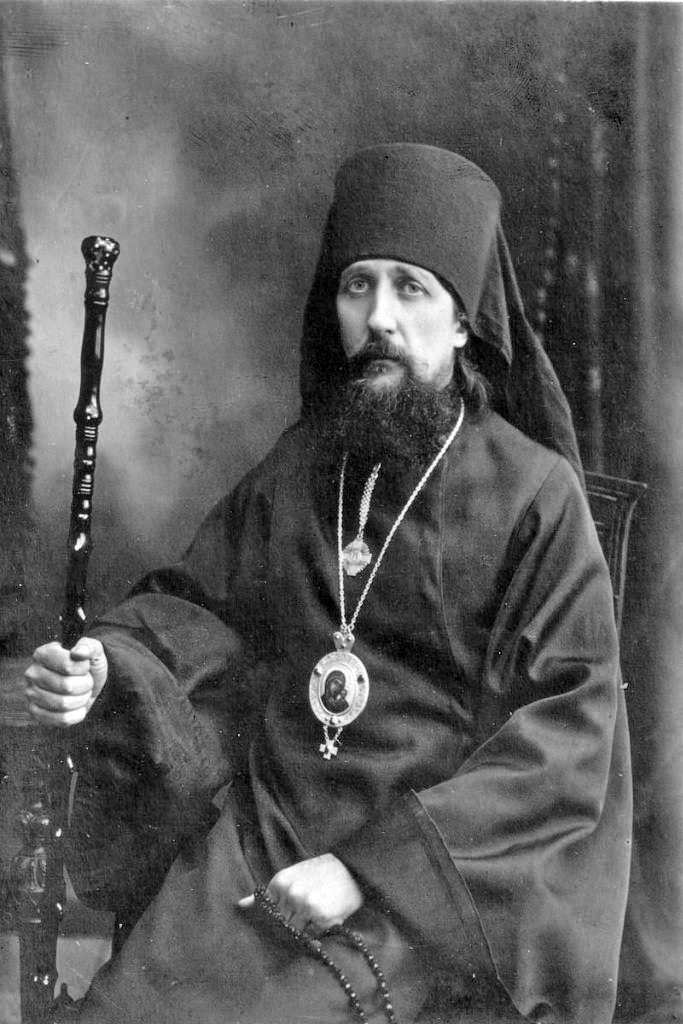
New Hieromartyr Ignatius Sadkovsky, Bishop of Skopin.

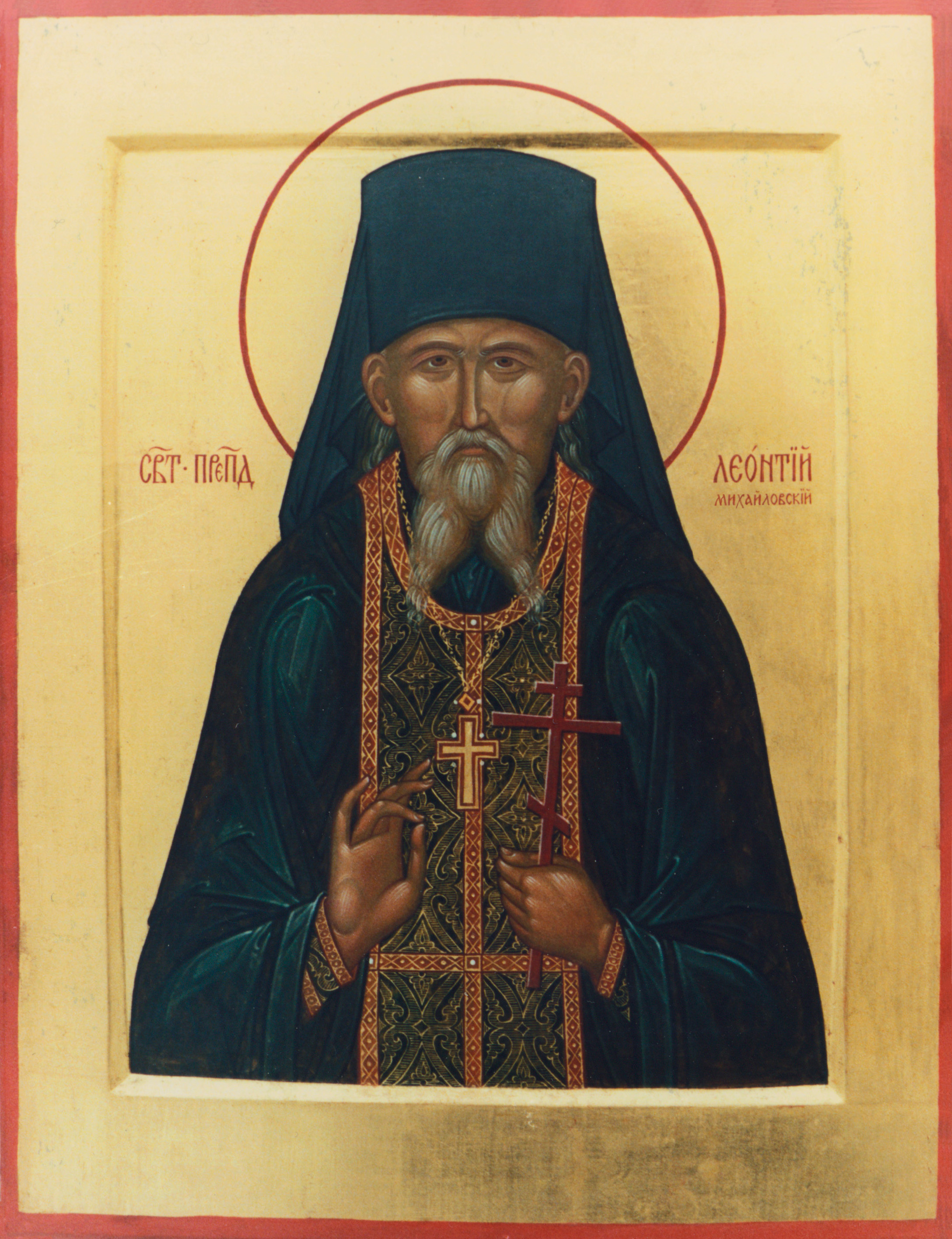
New Hieroconfessor Leontius Stasievich.

== Sources ==
- January 28 / February 10. Orthodox Calendar (PRAVOSLAVIE.RU).
- February 10 / January 28. HOLY TRINITY RUSSIAN ORTHODOX CHURCH (A parish of the Patriarchate of Moscow).
- January 28. OCA - The Lives of the Saints.
- The Autonomous Orthodox Metropolia of Western Europe and the Americas (ROCOR). St. Hilarion Calendar of Saints for the year of our Lord 2004. St. Hilarion Press (Austin, TX). pp. 10–11.
- January 28. Latin Saints of the Orthodox Patriarchate of Rome.
- The Roman Martyrology. Transl. by the Archbishop of Baltimore. Last Edition, According to the Copy Printed at Rome in 1914. Revised Edition, with the Imprimatur of His Eminence Cardinal Gibbons. Baltimore: John Murphy Company, 1916. pp. 28–29.
- Rev. Richard Stanton. A Menology of England and Wales, or, Brief Memorials of the Ancient British and English Saints Arranged According to the Calendar, Together with the Martyrs of the 16th and 17th Centuries. London: Burns & Oates, 1892. p. 38.

Greek Sources

- Great Synaxaristes: (in Greek) 28 ΙΑΝΟΥΑΡΙΟΥ. ΜΕΓΑΣ ΣΥΝΑΞΑΡΙΣΤΗΣ.
- (in Greek) Συναξαριστής. 28 Ιανουαρίου. ECCLESIA.GR. (H ΕΚΚΛΗΣΙΑ ΤΗΣ ΕΛΛΑΔΟΣ).

Russian Sources

- (in Russian) 10 февраля (28 января). Православная Энциклопедия под редакцией Патриарха Московского и всея Руси Кирилла (электронная версия). (Orthodox Encyclopedia - Pravenc.ru).
- (in Russian) 28 января (ст.ст.) 10 февраля 2013 (нов. ст.). Русская Православная Церковь Отдел внешних церковных связей. (DECR).
