= Acts of Shmona and of Gurya =

Syriac Christian martyrdom text

The Acts of Shmona and of Gurya (Note: On the pronunciation of these names, see Burkitt (1913, p. 185)) is a Syriac Christian martyrdom text. The setting takes place at Edessa during Roman Emperor Diocletian's Great Persecution.

== Manuscripts and translations ==
The martyrdom account of Shmona and Gurya was originally known through an abridgement by Symeon the Metaphrast.

Later, the work was discovered on a Syriac manuscript. The manuscript was translated to English by Francis Crawford Burkitt in his Euphemia and the Goth with the Acts of Martyrdom of the Confessors of Edessa (Amsterdam, 1913).

== Narrative overview ==
The introduction of the text begins with mentioning names of current figures at the time in which the martyrdom began such as Diocletian, Aba, Bishop Qona, and Abgar son of Zora During the Diocletianic Persecution, the two martyrs dwelling in Edessa were compelled to worship the sun, (Note: Kaizer 2008, p. 256; Though not mentioned in the text, the sun can be alluded to Zeus or equivalent to Bel.) but they refused to do so. An extensive discussion had occurred between the martyrs and the Eddessian governor Mysianus on why the two martyrs refused to worship the sun. (Note: Drijvers 1980, pp. 156 & 157, Layton 1972, p. 361; The refusal to worship the sun by the two martyrs evidently helps prove a sun-cult tradition had long existed in Edessa.) They were killed after that.

== Connection with other Syriac texts ==
The Acts of Shmona and Gurya and the Martyrdom of Habib are claimed to be authored by a Theophilus who also claims to have witness their martyrdoms. Scholars agree that the Acts of Shmona and of Gurya are fairly historically reliable and record a martyrdom which took place around 297 AD. One scholar suggests that it was written in 309 or 310 AD. This makes the Acts one of the first Syriac hagiographies. It became a model for later, less historically reliable martyr stories such as the Acts of Sharbel and the Acts of Barsamya, which are widely regarded to be entirely fictitious. Sebastian Brock considers the Doctrine of Addai, the Acts of Sharbel, the Martyrdom of Barsamya came from the same group of authors.

There is a list unique to the Doctrine of Addai, which names Addai's first Christian converts who are of nobility; The list reoccurs in the Acts of Sharbel and the Martyrdom of Barsamya. The names can be found in former pagan regions of Edessa dating back to the fourth and third century AD and are rarely mentioned in Syriac sources from the fifth century AD and after. Sebastian Brock states that the names were probably genuine ancestral names of those who authored all three texts, however, he doubts their conversion to Christianity. Further, he states the names mentioned in the Martyrdom of Barsamya and the Acts of Sharbel imitated literary writing styles from that of the Martyrdom of Habib and the Acts of Shmona and Gurya. With such a connection, Brock concludes the authors of the Acts of Sharbel and the Martyrdom of Barsamya were incorporating the ideal that their pagan ancestors had converted to Christianity, or they had a martyr prior to Shmona, Gurya, and Habib.

== Evidence of the martyrs ==
The historicity of the text is considered reliable. (Note: Millar 1993, p. 486; The descriptive account of the cities condition in the text reflect key elements of what life was like in the city during the Diocletianic Persecution.) Shmona and Gurya were reported to be buried at a place called "Beth Alah Qiqla". Relics of the two martyrs were found in Edessa, and Ephrem the Syrian mentions the martyrs in his Carmina Nisibena. The names of the two martyrs are also written on a Syriac calendar manuscript from 411 AD which lists names of martyrs from Edessa, and their names are written in the Menologion of Basil II.

== See also ==
- Syriac literature

== Sources ==
- Attridge, Harold W.; Hata, Gōhei (1992). Eusebius, Christianity, and Judaism. Wayne State University Press. ISBN 978-0-8143-2361-8.
- Brock, Sebastian (1992). "Eusebius and Syriac Christianity". In Attridge, H.W.; Hata, G. (eds.). Eusebius, Christianity, and Judaism. Wayne State University Press. pp. 212–234. ISBN 978-0-8143-2361-8. reprinted in Ferguson, Everett, ed. (1999). Doctrinal Diversity: Varieties of Early Christianity. Garland Pub. pp. 258–280. ISBN 978-0-8153-3071-4.
- Brock, Sebastian (April 1968). "Reviewed Work(s): Untersuchungen zur syrischen Literaturgeschichte I: Zur Märtyrerüberlieferung aus der Christenverfolgung Schapurs II. (Abhandlungen der Akademie der Wissenschaften in Göttingen, philologisch-historische Klasse, Dritte Folge, Nr. 67.) by Gernot Wiessner". Journal of Theological Studies. 19 (1). Oxford University Press: 300–309. doi:10.1093/jts/XIX.1.300. JSTOR 23959602.
- Brock, Sebastian (1998). "Syriac culture, 337–425". In Cameron, Averil; Garnsey, Peter (eds.). The Cambridge Ancient History, Volume XIII: the Late Empire, A.D. 337–425. The Cambridge Ancient History, second series. Cambridge University Press. ISBN 978-0-521-30200-5.
- Di Berardino, A.; Walford, A. (2008). Patrology: The Eastern Fathers from the Council of Chalcedon (451) to John of Damascus (750). James Clarke & Company. ISBN 978-0-227-17265-0.
- Drijvers, H. J. W. (1980). Cults and Beliefs at Edessa. BRILL. ISBN 9789004060500.
- Heal, Kristian S.; Kitchen, Robert A. (2013). Breaking the Mind. Catholic University of America Press. ISBN 978-0-8132-2166-3.
- Kaizer, Ted (2008). The Variety of Local Religious Life in the Near East: In the Hellenistic and Roman Periods. BRILL. ISBN 9789047433538.
- Layton, Bentley (1972). Studies in the History of Religions. BRILL.
- Millar, Fergus (1993). The Roman Near East, 31 B.C.-A.D. 337. Harvard University Press. ISBN 978-0-674-77886-3.
- Reinink, G. J. (1999). After Bardaisan: Studies on Continuity and Change in Syriac Christianity in Honour of Professor Han J.W. Drijvers. Peeters Publishers. ISBN 9789042907355.
- Saint-Laurent, Jeanne-Nicole Mellon (2015). Missionary Stories and the Formation of the Syriac Churches. University of California Press. ISBN 978-0-520-28496-8.
- Segal, J.B. (1970). Edessa 'the blessed city'. Clarendon Press. ISBN 9780198215455.
- Valantasis, Richard (2000). Religions of Late Antiquity in Practice. Princeton University Press. ISBN 978-0-691-05751-4.
- Wace, Henry (1911). Dictionary of Christian Biography and Literature. Delmarva Publications, Inc.
