= Gospel of the Twelve Apostles =

The Gospel of the Twelve Apostles is a gospel text that summarizes the four canonical gospels and the beginning of the Acts of the Apostles followed by three apocalypses. It survives only in a single manuscript and is inspired by the Apocalypse of Pseudo-Methodius. Its eschatological expectations was both simple and updated from previous Syriac apocalyptical texts of the same period and is a witness to the Syrian Christian strategy on coping with Muslim rule in the second half of the seventh century as the Muslim rule was no longer being perceived as a temporary event causing apocalyptic tensions to dissipate. It also advocates disconnection from Judaism and non-Miaphysite Christianity and presents the author's advocacy in their own community to not have them convert to Islam but have the community keep the true faith.

== Codex Harvard Syriac 93 ==
The Gospel of the Twelve Apostles survives in the incomplete codex Harvard Syriac 93, and by palaeography, J. Rendel Harris dates it to the middle of the eighth-century AD. The codex is from Harris's private collection which Harris numbered it as eighty-five (Cod. Syr. Harris 85) and is written in Estrangelo. The leaves are damaged, and Harris had to reconstruct the codex as he had received it with the leaves disorganized. The codex contains a variety of documents such as letters by Jacob of Edessa, an excerpt by Severus of Antioch, a variety of apostolic canons, discussions of individuals who recant their heresy, and an investigation of heavenly entities. After a written series of questions, it is followed up with an eleven-folio collection called the Gospel of the Twelve Apostles with the Revelations of Each of Them with an introduction to the Gospel of the Twelve Apostles followed by the Apocalypse of Simeon Kepha, the Apocalypse of James the Apostle, the Apocalypse of John the Little, and an extract from the Doctrine of Addai. J. Rendel Harris published an edition of these texts in 1900. The Gospel of the Twelve Apostles begins at folio 47r and ends on folio 58r. The Gospel in the manuscript takes up twenty-two pages, and in Harris's edition, twenty-one pages.

== Narrative overview ==
The text begins with a summarization of the canonical gospels to Jesus's appearance before the apostles after the resurrection, to grant the apostles spiritual power and to appoint them. The apostles question him concerning the time of redemption, and of his rejection as referenced in the Acts of the Apostles (Acts 1:6–7) but more extended. Proceeded after a prayer, the apostles are then informed about their appointments, to speak of "those things that are and those that are to come" according to the power of the Holy Spirit. The apostles pray for revelation after he ascended, and the gospel is concluded after the following three apocalypses: the Apocalypse of Simeon Kepha, the Apocalypse of James the Apostle, and the Apocalypse of John the Little.

== Textual analysis ==
The title of the text is present in the manuscript and has often been associated with the second century Gospel of the Twelve referenced by Epiphanius of Salamis who designated its use amongst the Ebionites, and in Origen's Homily on Luke who refers to it as "of the Twelve Apostles". The author of the Syriac Gospel of the Twelve Apostles attempts to establish their gospel as deriving from an ancient source by referring to their own translation of the work originating first from Hebrew then to Greek into Syriac which presented the text as an original Hebrew Gospel of the Twelve Apsotles, but the author's Syriac gospel differentiates from that of Epiphanius's as the introduction is different, and John the Baptist is completely absent from their gospel. The apostles in the Syriac author's gospel do not speak for themselves, nor are they represented by Matthew the Apostle. With that evidence, J. Rendel Harris concludes the title of the text to be fabricated, and the text composed at a late period.

== Sources ==
- Harris, James Rendel (1900). The Gospel of the Twelve Apostles Together with the Apocalypses of Each One of Them. Cambridge University Press.
- Penn, Michael Philip (2015). When Christians First Met Muslims: A Sourcebook of the Earliest Syriac Writings on Islam. University of California Press. ISBN 9780520960572.
- Thomas, David Richard; Roggema, Barbara; Sala, Juan Pedro Monferrer (2009). Christian-Muslim Relations: A Bibliographical History (600-900). BRILL. ISBN 9789004169753.
