= Charbel (martyr) =

Christian saint (d. 107 AD)

Saint Charbel
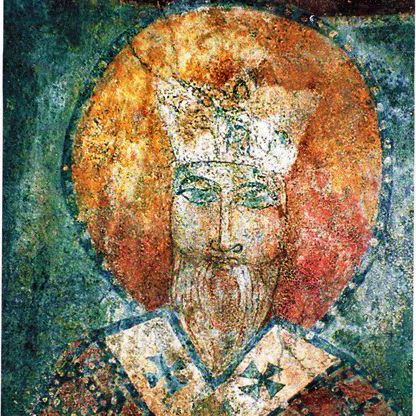

Martyr
- Born: Edessa (modern-day Şanlıurfa, Turkey)
- Died: 107; Edessa (modern-day Şanlıurfa, Turkey)
- Venerated in: Catholic Church; Eastern Orthodox
- Major shrine: Maad. Lebanon
- Feast: 5 September, 15 October, 29 January

Charbel of Edessa (Arabic: مار شربل الرهاوي, Syriac: ܩܲܕܝܼܫܵܐ ܡܵܪܝ ܫܲܪܒܹܝܠ, romanized: qaddīšā mār šarbēl; died 107 AD) also known as Tiphael, is an early 2nd-century Syriac saint and Christian martyr venerated by the Catholic Church and the Eastern Orthodox Church. He was murdered during the Persecution of Christians under the Roman Emperor Trajan (AD 53-117). His sister, Bebaia of Edessa (also Barbe, Thivea), was murdered soon afterwards. The two martyrs are venerated on January 29. His story is linked to that of Barsimaeus, who was said to have converted him to Christianity from Paganism, and may be backdated from events that took place in Edessa under the emperor Decius (r. 249–251).

Charbel of Edessa has many shrines in Lebanon in the Maronite Church with the exception of a ruined Greek Orthodox shrine in Douma, Lebanon. The major shrine is located in the village of Maad, Lebanon. It was built on the ruins of a pagan temple and has exceptional frescoes dating to the 12th century AD. Other shrines are located in Jezzine, Mar Elias Street in Beirut, Adonis, Ibrine.
