= Palladius of Antioch =

Patriarch of Antioch from 488 to 498

Saint Palladius of Antioch
- Died: 390
- Venerated in: Eastern Orthodox Church; Catholic Church; Oriental Orthodox Churches

Palladius of Antioch (died 390), also known as Saint Palladius the Desert Dweller and Palladius the Hermit, was an Early Christian monk in the Roman Empire. Palladius was a hermit in the desert near Antioch (modern Turkey). He was a friend of Saint Simeon. Palladius died in 390 of natural causes and was canonized in pre-Congregation times.

Saint Palladius the Desert Dweller led an ascetic life in a mountain cave near Syrian Antioch. Because of his struggles, he is said to have received the gift of wonder-working from the Lord. By some accounts, a merchant was once found murdered by robbers near his cave. People accused St Palladius of the murder, but through the prayers of the saint, the dead man rose up and named his murderers. The saint died at the end of the fourth century, leaving behind several works.

Saint Palladius is commemorated in the Oriental Orthodox Churches, Orthodox Church and Eastern Catholic Churches on January 28.

== See also ==
- Christian monasticism
- Stylites
