= January 27 (Eastern Orthodox liturgics) =

Day in the Eastern Orthodox liturgical calendar

Eastern Orthodox liturgical calendar
January 26	January 27	January 28
January 27 O.S. ≍ February 9 N.S. January 27 N.S ≍ January 14 O.S.

An Eastern Orthodox cross

January 27 in Eastern Orthodox liturgical calendars is a feast day and a day of commemoration of saints and martyrs. Although some Orthodox churches use the Revised Julian Calendar and others use the traditional Julian calendar, the fixed commemorations for their respective January 27 are broadly the same, no matter which calendar is used. (Note: Despite the dates being the same, the days to which they refer typically differ by 13 days. The notation Old Style or O.S. is sometimes used to indicate a date in the traditional Julian Calendar (the "Old Calendar"). The notation New Style or N.S, indicates a date in the Revised Julian calendar (the "New Calendar").)

== Saints ==
- Venerable Peter of Egypt, disciple of Abba Lot (5th century)
- Saint Marciana (Markiane) (Euphemia) the Empress, wife of Emperor Justin I the Elder (r. 518-527), interred in the Church of the Holy Apostles
- Saint Dimitrianos the Wonderworker, Bishop of Tamassos, Cyprus
- Venerable Claudinus, monastic
- Saint Elias II, Patriarch of Jerusalem (797)
- Saint Ashot I Kurapalates of Iberia (Askiot), first Bagrationi Prince of Georgia, martyred (830) (see also: January 29)

== Pre-Schism Western saints ==
- Saint Julian of Sora, martyred under Antoninus Pius (c. 150) (Note: Born in Dalmatia, he was arrested, tortured and beheaded in Sora in Campania in Italy under Antoninus Pius (138-161).) (Note: "At Sora, St. Julian, martyr, who, being arrested in the persecution of Antoninus, was beheaded, because a pagan temple had fallen to the ground whilst he was tortured. Thus did he win the crown of martyrdom.")
- Saint Julian of Le Mans, venerated as the first Bishop of Le Mans in France (3rd century) (see also: July 13 - East)
- Saint Devota, virgin-martyr in Corsica who expired on the rack in the persecution of Diocletian (303) (Note: Her relics are in Monaco. She is the patroness-saint of both Corsica and Monaco.)
- Saint Avitus, venerated in the Canary Islands as their Apostle and first Bishop, martyred in Africa
- Saints Datius, Reatrus (Restius) and Companions; and Datius (Dativus), Julian, Vincent and 27 Companions (c. 500) (Note: Two groups of martyrs in North Africa; the second group suffered under the Arian Vandals.)
- Saint Maurus (Marius, Maur, May), founder of a monastery in Bodon (Bobacum) in France (c. 555)
- Saint Natalis of Ulster, a monastic founder in the north of Ireland, he worked with Saint Columba (564) (Note: He was Abbot of Cill, Naile and Daunhinis. His holy well still exists.)
- Saint Lupus of Châlons, Bishop of Châlons-sur-Saone, famous for his charity to the afflicted (c. 610)
- Saint Vitalian, Pope of Rome from 657 to 672 (672) (Note: He was much troubled by Monothelitism. He consecrated Theodore of Tarsus as Archbishop of Canterbury in 668.)
- Saint Emerius, founder and first Abbot of St. Stephen of Bañoles in Catalonia in Spain (8th century)
- Saint Candida, mother of Saint Emerius, anchoress at the monastery of St. Stephen of Bañoles in Spain (c. 798)
- Saint Gamelbert of Michaelsbuch (800) (Note: The son of rich parents in Bavaria, Gamelbert went to Rome on pilgrimage, was ordained priest and was parish priest of Michaelsbuch in Germany for over fifty years.)
- Saint Theodoric II of Orleans, monk at Saint-Pierre-le-Vif in Sens in France, became Bishop of Orleans (1022)
- Saint Alruna of Cham (1045), recluse

== Post-Schism Orthodox saints ==
- Venerable Titus the Soldier, monk of the Kiev Caves Monastery (11th century)
- Saint Clement the Stylite of Mount Ságmata, Boeotia (12th century)
- Saint Demetrius Klepinine, Priest of Paris (1944)
- Saint John the Almsgiver, of Amphiale, Piræus (1966) (Old Calendarist only)

=== New martyrs and confessors ===
- New Martyr Demetrius at Constantinople (1784)
- New Hieromartyr Peter Zverev of Voronezh (1929) (Note: See: (in Russian) Петр (Зверев). Википедии. (Russian Wikipedia).)
- New Hieromartyr Paul Dobromislov, Protopresbyter of Alma-Ata (1940)
- New Confessor Anna Ivashkina of Ryazan (1948)
- Venerable New Confessor Leonty Stasevich of Ivanovo, Archimandrite (1972)
- New Hieromartyr Leontius the Mystic of Ternopil and Jablechna monastery, Poland (1972)

== Other commemorations ==
- Translation of the relics (438) of Saint John Chrysostom, Archbishop of Constantinople (407) (Note: "AT Constantinople, St. John, bishop, who was surnamed Chrysostom, on account of his golden flow of eloquence. He greatly promoted the interests of the Christian religion by his preaching and exemplary life, and after many toils, closed his life in banishment. His sacred body was brought to Constantinople on this day, in the reign of Theodosius the younger; it was afterwards taken to Rome and placed in the basilica of the Prince of the Apostles.")
- Repose of Nun Neonilla of the Farther Davidov Convent (1875)
- Repose of Schema-nun Margarita (Lakhtionova) of Diveyevo Monastery (1997)

== Icon gallery ==
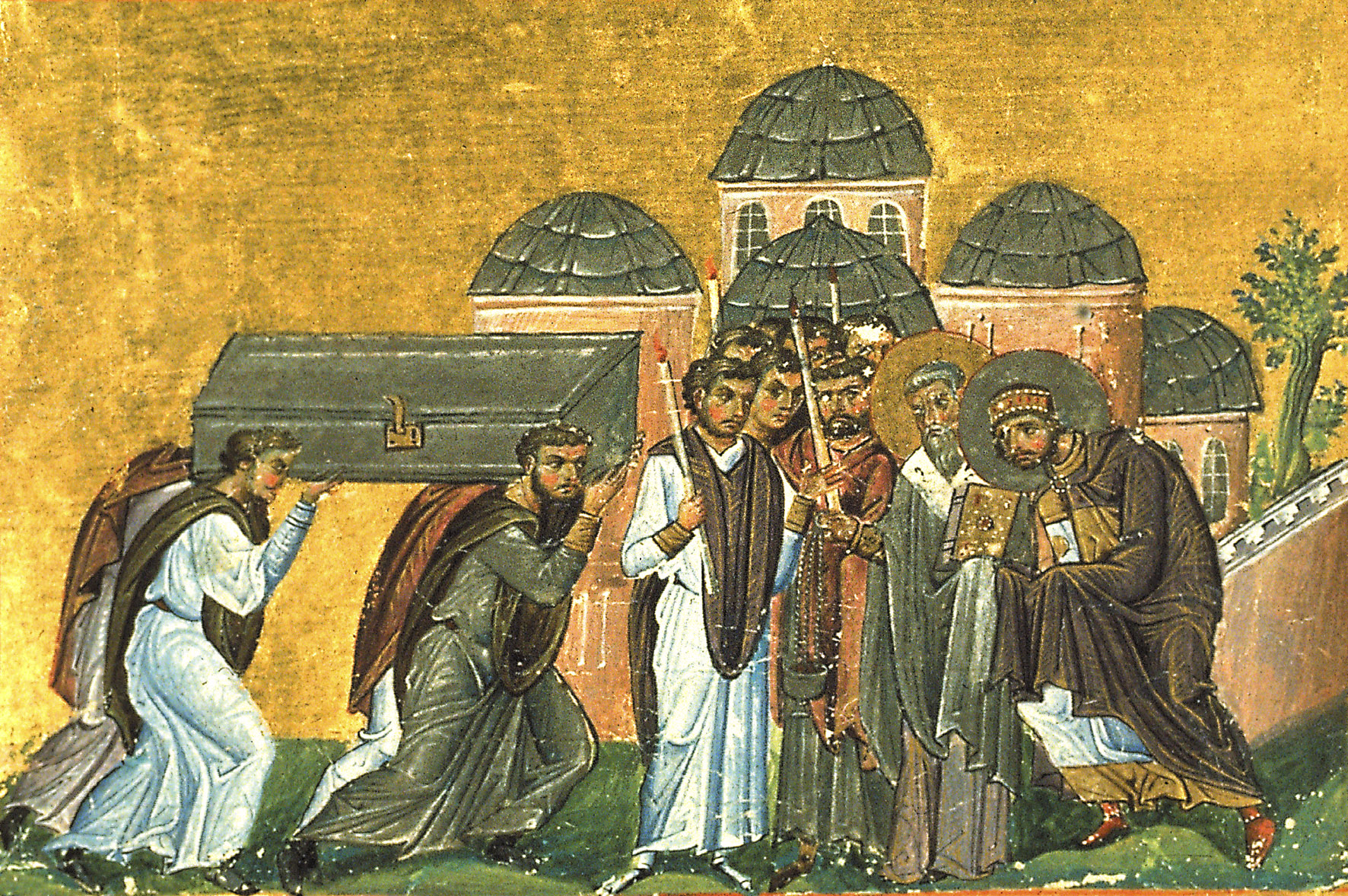
Translation of the relics (437) of St. John Chrysostom, Archbishop of Constantinople.

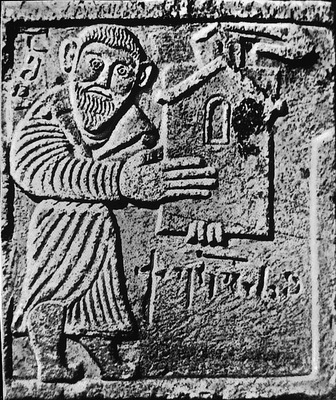
Saint Ashot I of Iberia (Ashot Kurapalates), first Bagrationi King of Georgia.

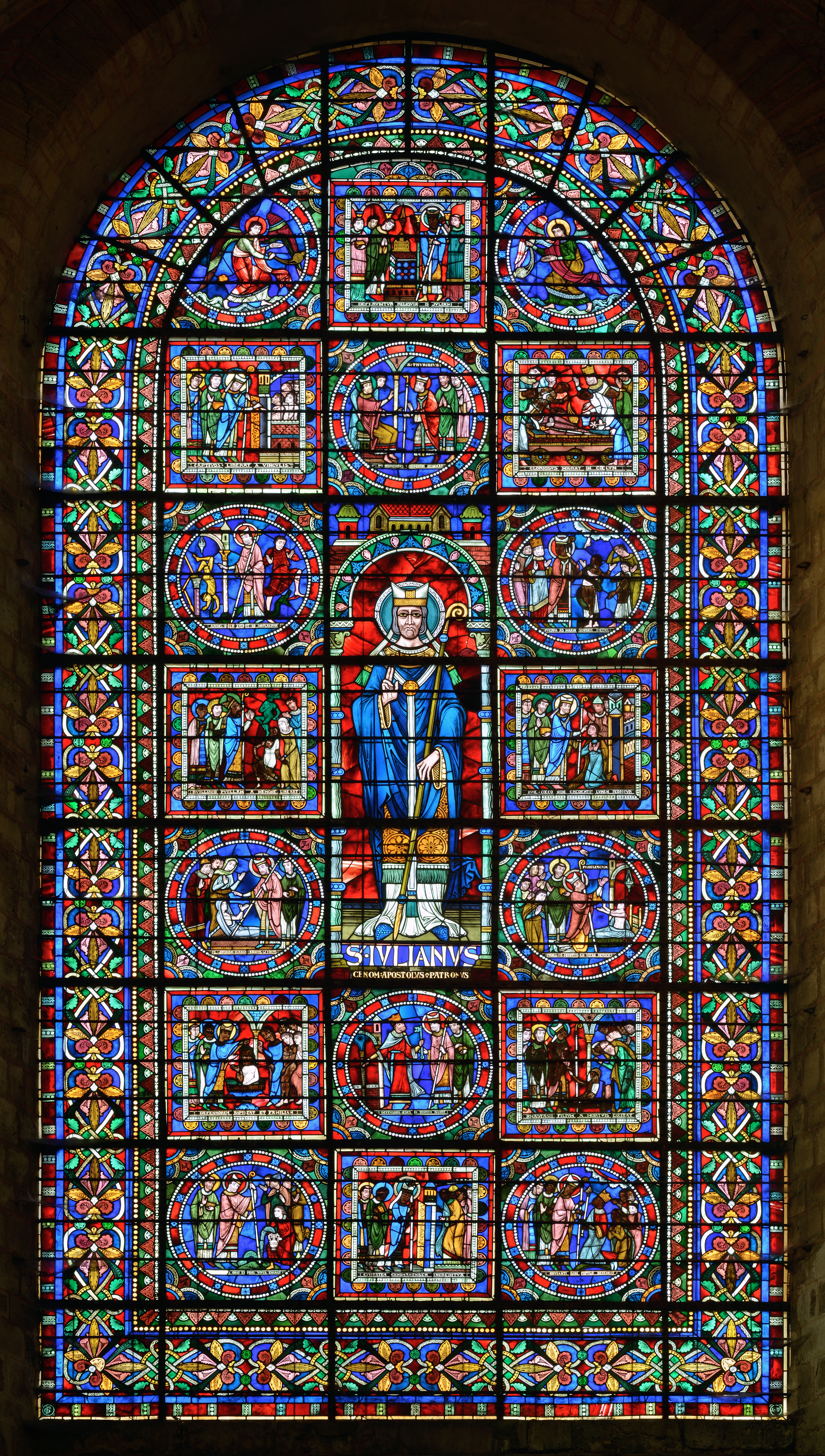
Stained glass depicting Julian of Le Mans, and 16 episodes of his life.

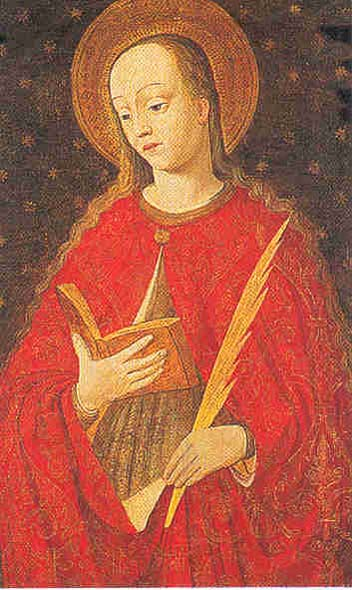
Saint Devota, virgin-martyr in Corsica, patroness-saint of both Corsica and Monaco.

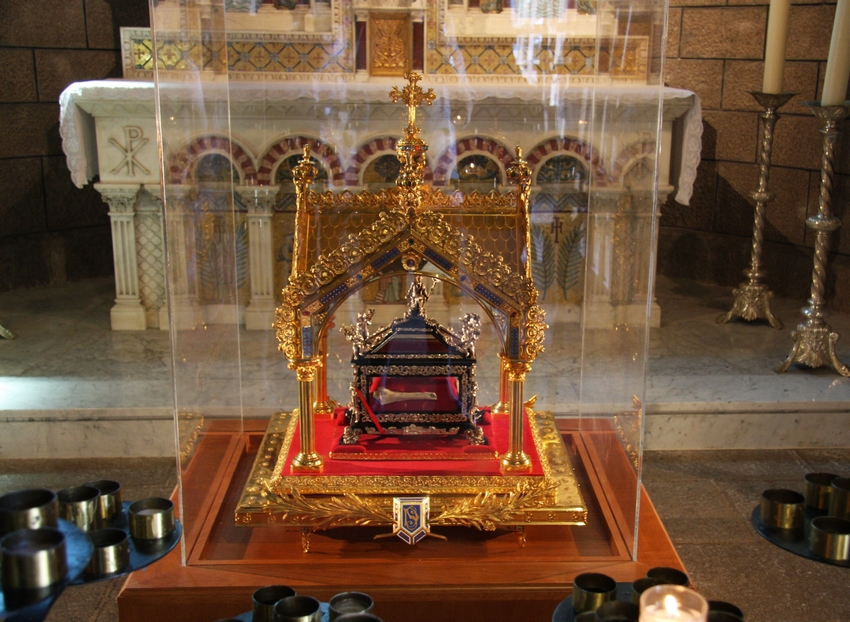
Relics of Saint Devota.

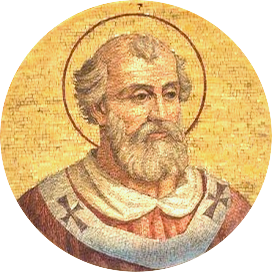
Saint Vitalian, Pope of Rome.

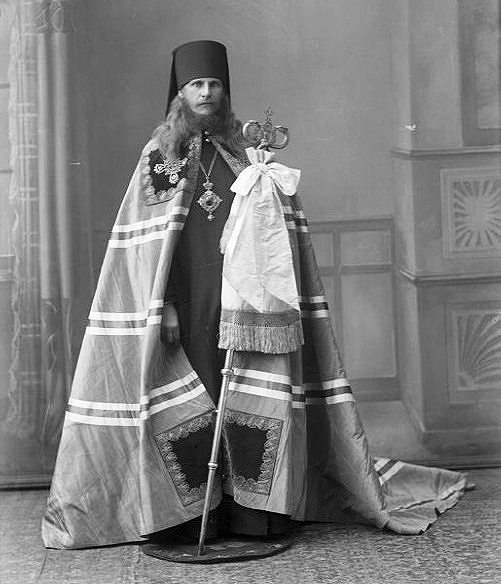
New Hieromartyr Peter (Zverev) of Voronezh.

== Sources ==
- January 27 / February 9. Orthodox Calendar (PRAVOSLAVIE.RU).
- February 9 / January 27. HOLY TRINITY RUSSIAN ORTHODOX CHURCH (A parish of the Patriarchate of Moscow).
- January 27. OCA - The Lives of the Saints.
- The Autonomous Orthodox Metropolia of Western Europe and the Americas (ROCOR). St. Hilarion Calendar of Saints for the year of our Lord 2004. St. Hilarion Press (Austin, TX). p. 10.
- January 27. Latin Saints of the Orthodox Patriarchate of Rome.
- The Roman Martyrology. Transl. by the Archbishop of Baltimore. Last Edition, According to the Copy Printed at Rome in 1914. Revised Edition, with the Imprimatur of His Eminence Cardinal Gibbons. Baltimore: John Murphy Company, 1916. pp. 27–28.
- Rev. Richard Stanton. A Menology of England and Wales, or, Brief Memorials of the Ancient British and English Saints Arranged According to the Calendar, Together with the Martyrs of the 16th and 17th Centuries. London: Burns & Oates, 1892. pp. 37–38.

Greek Sources

- Great Synaxaristes: (in Greek) 27 ΙΑΝΟΥΑΡΙΟΥ. ΜΕΓΑΣ ΣΥΝΑΞΑΡΙΣΤΗΣ.
- (in Greek) Συναξαριστής. 27 Ιανουαρίου. ECCLESIA.GR. (H ΕΚΚΛΗΣΙΑ ΤΗΣ ΕΛΛΑΔΟΣ).

Russian Sources

- (in Russian) 9 февраля (27 января). Православная Энциклопедия под редакцией Патриарха Московского и всея Руси Кирилла (электронная версия). (Orthodox Encyclopedia - Pravenc.ru).
- (in Russian) 27 января (ст.ст.) 9 февраля 2013 (нов. ст.). Русская Православная Церковь Отдел внешних церковных связей. (DECR).
