= Edessene Apocalypse =

7th-century Christian apocalyptic text

The Edessene Apocalypse or Edessene Fragment is an apocalyptic text. The original title has not been preserved due to missing pages; the conventional title was coined by modern scholars because the content heavily focuses on Edessa. The text is a revised and an abridged version of the Apocalypse of Pseudo-Methodius with modified schema. It is a witness to the crisis Syriac Christians were experiencing due to the political success of Abd Allah ibn al-Zubayr and the intensified pressure on non-Muslim communities in his reign.

== Manuscripts ==
The Edessene Apocalypse is partially preserved in two East Syrian manuscripts. In Paris Syriac 350, a collection of tractates which the colophon is dated to 1646, contains the longer fragments of the texts. The Edessene Apocalypse though begins in mid-story, and the codex is missing leaves. The text is placed after a discussion of canon law but before a discussion of Greek theological terms and their technical translation. Consisting of two folios and minor textual variants, Cambridge Additional 2054 and its content overlaps middle two-thirds of Paris Syriac 350. William Wright dates the pages to the eighteenth century, and much of the Syriac of Cambridge Additional 2054 is quoted in his 1901 catalogue of Cambridge manuscripts. Fraçois Nau published in 1907 an edition of Paris Syriac 350. Francisco Javier Martinez reprinted Nau's edition along with notes of all variants of Cambridge Additional 2054 in a 1985 unpublished PhD dissertation.

== Narrative overview ==
The "Children of Hagar" or "Ishmael" in the text are a depiction of the Muslims. The Second Fitna is caused after Christians are oppressed by the Sons of Ishmael, while at the same time, famine and drought are brought by nature after witnessing Arab infidelity. Helena is then foreshadowed as the end of Arab rule when she discoverers the True Cross in Jerusalem and makes it a bridle from its nails for Constantine I, a narrative depicted from the Judas Cyriacus Legend. Stated by a horse as it enters a church in Constantinople, the "Kingdom of the Christians had come"" as it inserts its head in the bridle, the Sons of Ishmael are then overthrown by a rising king of the Greeks who then pursues them to Mecca. The Arabs are not defeated though, and the Greek kingdom continues for two-hundred eight years. Eventually, God gathers Alexander's previously invaded unclean nations to Mecca and sends angels to kill them by hail. Except for Edessa, the Son of perdition takes control of the world. A king of the Greeks then places his crown on the Christ's Cross at Golgotha after the Son of perdition enters Jerusalem. The world ends, and the Last Judgment commences.

== Authorship ==
Despite two extensive East Syrian manuscripts, the content focuses much on Edessa which provides the possibility of the text being written in the region, and scholars strongly agree that the author was most likely a Miaphysite as the region was more populated by Miaphysites rather than East Syrians. The emphasis on the last Greek king in Ethiopic heritage shared in both the Edessene Apocalypse and the Apocalypse of Pseudo-Methodius would also support Miaphysite authorship.

== Date ==
The date is disputed. The date "694 years" for the last emperor defeating the Muslims and the establishment of the Christian empire, and its continuation until the eschaton Nau considers to be the Christian era which he has estimated the date to be 683 AD. 1294–1295 by Francisco Javier Martinez as he assumes the "694 years" to be the Hajri era. G. J. Reinink presumes the Epiphany of Christ to "694 years" as an Edessene date referring to 692 AD. The text alludes to the revolt of Abd Allah ibn al-Zubayr and the Second Fitna when the witnessing author depicts the difficulties occurring because of the "Sons of Hagar" combating in the east that leads to the eschaton, which according to the author, these events were prophesied in the Gospel of Matthew (24:7). Abd Allah ibn al-Zubayr's tax reform in Mesopotamia around 691–692 is also possibly alluded to when the author states that the Sons of Hagar caused distress on the populace when their belongings were stolen by the Sons of Hagar.

== Bibliography ==
- Hashmi, Sohail (2012). Just Wars, Holy Wars, and Jihads: Christian, Jewish, and Muslim Encounters and Exchanges. Oxford University Press. ISBN 9780199920822.
- Palmer, Andrew; Brock, Sebastian; Hoyland, Robert (1993). The Seventh Century in the West-Syrian Chronicles. Liverpool University Press. ISBN 9780853232384.
- Penn, Michael Philip (2015). When Christians First Met Muslims: A Sourcebook of the Earliest Syriac Writings on Islam. University of California Press. ISBN 9780520284944.
- Thomas, David Richard; Roggema, Barbara; Sala, Juan Pedro Monferrer (2009). Christian-Muslim Relations: A Bibliographical History (600-900). BRILL. ISBN 9789004169753.
- Whalen, Brett Edward (2019). Pilgrimage in the Middle Ages: A Reader. University of Toronto Press. ISBN 9781442603844.
