= Meliton =

Meliton or Melitón, Greek: Μελίτων is a given name of Greek origin, derived from the word μέλι, i.e., literally meaning "like honey", "sweet". Notable people with the name include:

- Melitón Carvajal (1847–1935), Peruvian military and political figure
- Melitón Manzanas (1906–1968), high-ranking police officer in Francoist Spain killed by ETA paramilitaries
- Meliton Balanchivadze (1862–1937), Georgian composer of classical music
- Meliton Kantaria (1920–1993), Georgian sergeant of the Soviet Army who hoisted a Soviet flag Banner of Victory over the Reichstag in 1945
- Meliton, Metropolitan of Chalcedon (1913–1989), Greek Orthodox bishop
- Melito of Sardis, Bishop of Sardis in the 2nd century

== See also ==
- Estadio Meliton Dubon, stadium located in Macuelizo, Santa Barbara
- Melitón Albáñez Domínguez Airstrip (IATA: N/A) is a dirt airstrip located in Ejido Melitón Albáñez Domíngez, Mexico
- Meliton, a novella by Ivan Bunin published in 1901
