= Barsimaeus =

Saint Barsimaeus Bishop of Edessa
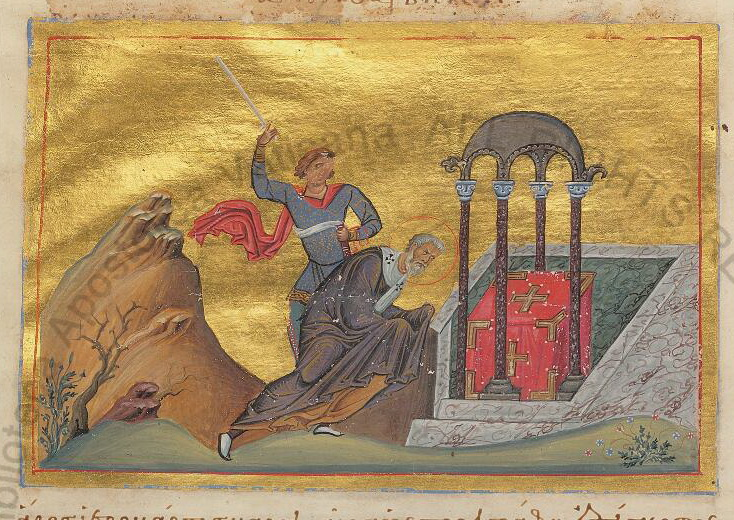
- Died: 114; Edessa
- Feast: 30 January (Roman calendar); 29 January (Eastern calendar)

Saint Barsimaeus (or Barsimeus, Barses, Barsamya; said to have died in 114 AD) (Syriac: ܒܪܣܡܝܐ possibly “son of the blind man" or “son of the divine standard”) was a bishop of Edessa who is revered as a martyr. His feast day is 30 January. In fact, his story probably derives from that of a much later bishop of Edessa who was persecuted around 250 AD but not martyred.

== Life ==
The standard account says Barsimaeus was a missionary bishop of Edessa, Syria. He was martyred in 114 AD during the persecutions of Christians by the Emperor Trajan (r. 98–117). His feast day is 30 January in the Roman calendar, and 29 January in the Eastern calendar. Under 30 January the Roman Martyrology commemorates Barsimeo (Barsamya), bishop of Edessa, martyred under the emperor Trajan in 106 or 112 for having been too zealous in converting his fellow Christians, particularly Sarbil, a pagan priest, and his sister Bebaia.

It seems that this story was backdated about a century and a half in order to link the early Church of Edessa to the Apostles, and in fact refers to the persecution of Barsimaeus during the persecution of Decius (r. 249–251). He probably lived and worked in the middle of the 200s and succeeded Palut as bishop of Edessa.

In the alternative version, Barsimeo, bishop of Edessa, was beaten with rods for his faith in Christ under the emperor Decius. After he was released from prison, he devoted the rest of his life to the governance of the church that had been entrusted to him. A variant says that Barsimaeus had baptized Sharbel, and was arrested and tried after Sharbel was martyred. The arrest triggered popular protests, and the judge delayed torturing or executing him despite his refusal to obey the emperor's decree. Then a new decree reached Edessa that repealed the previous one and ordered his release. The crowd received him with enthusiasm as a "persecuted confessor" and friend of Sharbel.

== Monks of Ramsgate account ==
The Monks of Ramsgate wrote in their Book of Saints (1921),

BARSIMAEUS (St.) Bp. M. (January 30)
(2nd century) The third Bishop of Edessa in Syria, put to death as a Christian by the President Lysias, under the Emperor Trajan, A.D. 114.

== Butler's account ==
The hagiographer Alban Butler wrote in his Lives of the Primitive Fathers, Martyrs, and Other Principal Saints, under January 30,

St. Barsimæus, Bishop and Martyr [Called by the Syrians Barsaumas.] He was the third bishop of Edessa from Saint Thaddaeus, one of the seventy-two disciples. Saint Barsaumas was crowned with martyrdom, being condemned to die for his zeal in converting great multitudes to the faith, by the president Lysias, in the reign of Trajan, when that prince having passed the Euphrates, made the conquest of Mesopotamia in 114. Saint Barsimæus is mentioned on the 30th of January in the Roman Martyrology, and in the Greek Mænology.

== See also ==
- Martyrdom of Barsamya

== Sources ==
- Butler, Alban (1866), The Lives of the Saints, vol. I: January This article incorporates text from this source, which is in the public domain.
- "Den hellige Barsimaeus av Edessa (200-t)", Den katolske kirke (in Norwegian)
- "Saint Barsimaeus of Edessa", CatholicSaints.info
- Sauget, Joseph-Marie (2013), "San Barsimeo (Barsamya) Vescovo di Edessa", Enciclopedia dei santi (in Italian), ISBN 9788831193474
- St. Augustine's Abbey, Ramsgate (1921). The Book of saints : a dictionary of servants of God canonized by the Catholic Church. London: A. & C. Black, ltd. OCLC 671676136. This article incorporates text from this source, which is in the public domain.
