= Ephraim of Pereyaslavl =

Eastern Orthodox saint

Saint Ephraim of Pereyaslavl
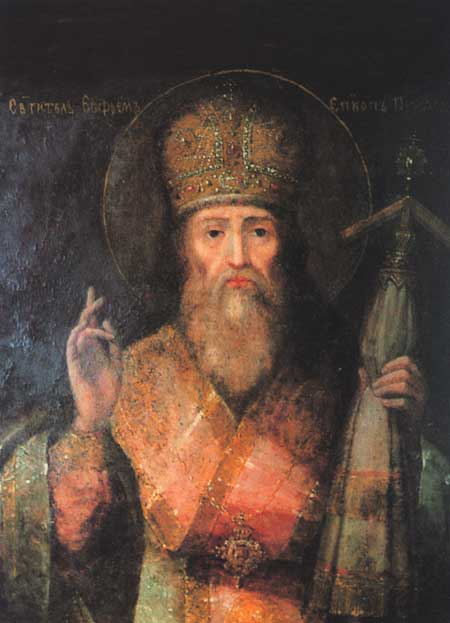

Venerable
- Died: 1098
- Venerated in: Eastern Orthodox Church
- Major shrine: Kiev Pechersk Lavra
- Feast: 28 January; 28 September; 2nd Sunday of Great Lent

Ephraim II of Pereyaslav (Russian: Ефрем Переяславский; died between 1091 and 1101), also known as Ephraim of the Caves (Russian: Ефрем Печерский), was a bishop of Pereyaslavl.

He is venerated as a saint in the Eastern Orthodox Church.

== Life ==
Ephraim is presumed to have been of Greek descent. Before his tonsure into monasticism, was treasurer and steward of household affairs (1054–1068) at the court of Grand Prince Iziaslav Yaroslavich. Weighed down by this noisy and bustling life and wishing to become a monk, he was accepted by Anthony of Kiev and was tonsured on 23 March by Nikon, then the hegumen of the Kiev Pechersk Lavra.

The enraged Iziaslav demanded that Ephraim return, threatening to lock him up in prison and to destroy the Pechersk Lavra. Anthony and the brethren left the monastery and decided to go to another place. Iziaslav, however, feared the wrath of God. He took his wife's advice and withdrew his forces from the monastery in disgrace.

Ephraim wished to go on pilgrimage to the holy places abroad. With the blessing of Anthony, he journeyed to Constantinople and settled there in one of the monasteries. While in Constantinople, Ephraim made a copy of the Studite monastic rule. He took it to Kiev at the request of Theodosius of Kiev. As soon as he received the rule, Theodosius implemented it in the Pechersk Lavra. Studite rule then became the prevailing rule for Russian monasteries of that time.

After 1072, Ephraim was made bishop in Pereyaslavl, with the title of metropolitan. He adorned Pereyaslavl with many beautiful churches and public buildings, and he built stone walls around the city in the Greek manner. He built free hospices for the poor and travelers, and constructed several public bath-houses.

In 1091, Ephraim participated in the opening and solemn transfer of the relics of Theodosius. A Life of St. Ephraim existed in former times, but it has not survived. An account of him is found both in the Life of St. Theodosius, and in Russian chronicles. A tale and encomium for Nicholas the Wonderworker is ascribed to Ephraim.

== Death and legacy ==
Ephraim died in 1098. He was buried in the Church of the Presentation in the Near Caves of the Kiev Pechersk Lavra.

He is recognised as one of the Monastic Fathers of the Near Caves.

His memory is also celebrated on 28 January, 28 September, and on the second Sunday of Great Lent.

== Sources ==
- Nazarenko, A. V. (2008). "Ефрем Печерский". Православная энциклопедия. Т. XIX: Ефесянам послание - Зверев. Православная энциклопедия. pp. 36–40. ISBN 978-5-89572-034-9.
