= William Cureton =

British orientalist (1808–1864)

William Cureton FRS (1808 – 17 June 1864) was an English Orientalist.

== Life ==
He was born in Westbury, Shropshire, son of William Cureton and his wife. After being educated at the Adams' Grammar School in Newport, Shropshire and at Christ Church, Oxford, he took orders in 1832, initially serving as curate of St Andrew's, Oddington, Oxfordshire. became chaplain of Christ Church, sublibrarian of the Bodleian, and, in 1837, assistant keeper of manuscripts in the British Museum. He was afterwards appointed select preacher to the University of Oxford, chaplain in ordinary to the queen, rector of St Margaret's, Westminster, and canon of Westminster Abbey. He was elected a fellow of the Royal Society and a trustee of the British Museum, and was also honored by several continental societies. Cureton died at his home, Brook House in Westbury, on 17 July 1864 from an illness brought on by a railway accident the previous year, leaving his widow Harriet.

== Works ==
Cureton's most remarkable work was the edition with notes and an English translation of the Epistles of Ignatius to Polycarp, the Ephesians and the Romans, from a Syriac manuscript that had been found in the monastery of St. Mary Deipara, in the desert of Nitria, near Cairo. He held that the manuscript he used gave the truest text, that all other texts were inaccurate, and that the epistles contained in the manuscript were the only genuine epistles of Ignatius that we possess, a view which received the support of Ferdinand Christian Baur, Bunsen, and many other eminent scholars, but which was opposed by Charles Wordsworth and by several German scholars, and is now generally abandoned. Cureton supported his view by his Vindiciae Ignatianae and his Corpus Ignatianum, a Complete Collection of the Ignatian Epistles, genuine, interpolated and spurious.

He also edited:

- a partial Syriac text of the Festal Letters of St Athanasius, which was translated into English by Henry Burgess (1854), and published in the Library of Fathers of the Holy Catholic Church;
- Remains of a very Ancient Recension of the Four Gospels in Syriac, hitherto unknown in Europe; This came to be known as the Curetonian Gospels after Cureton.
- Spicilegium Syriacum, containing Remains of Bardesan, Meliton, Ambrose, Mara Bar Serapion;
- The third Part of the Ecclesiastical History of John, Bishop of Ephesus, which was translated by Robert Payne Smith;
- Fragments of the Iliad of Homer from a Syriac Palimpsest;
- an Arabic work known as the Thirty-first Chapter of the Book entitled The Lamp that guides to Salvation, written by a Christian of Tekrit;
- The Book of Religious and Philosophical Sects, by Mohammed al Sharastani;
- a Commentary on the Book of Lamentations, by Rabbi Tanchum;
- the Pillar of the Creed of the Sunnites.

Cureton also published several sermons, among which was one entitled The Doctrine of the Trinity not Speculative but Practical. After his death William Wright edited with a preface the Ancient Syriac Documents relative to the earliest Establishment of Christianity in Edessa and the neighboring Countries, from the Year of our Lords Ascension to the beginning of the Fourth Century; discovered, edited and annotated by the late W. Cureton.
