= Doctrine of Addai =

Syriac Christian apocrypha

The Doctrine of Addai (Syriac: ܡܠܦܢܘܬܐ ܕܐܕܝ ܫܠܝܚܐ Malp̄ānūṯā d-Addai Šlīḥā) is a work of Christian Syriac literature, written in the late 4th or early 5th century CE. It recounts the legend of the Image of Edessa as well as the legendary works of Addai and his disciple Mari in Mesopotamia.

== Content ==
The document details how Addai went to Edessa and cured King Abgar — fulfilling the promise made to Abgar by Jesus. After the royal family had been healed and Addai preached for Abgar, the royal family and many of the citizens of Edessa became Christians. Abgar asked Addai to build a church in Edessa. Many people came to the church in order to pray and listen to reading daily from the Old Testament and the Ditonron - a reading that William Cureton purported was the Diatessaron of Tatian. Addai died in 45 AD just prior to Abgar, meaning that he was in Edessa for approximately ten or eleven years.

== History ==
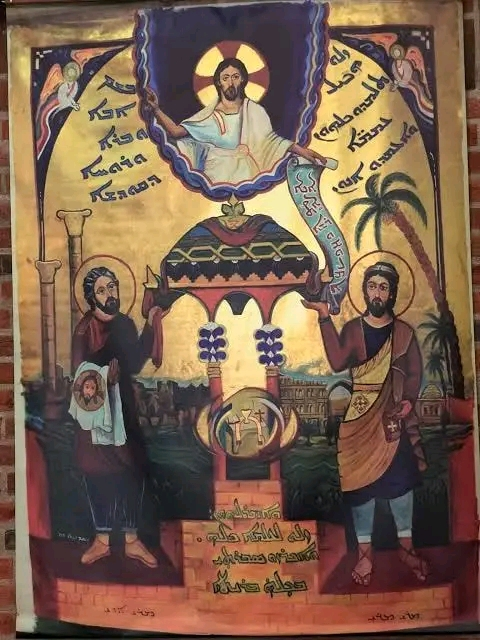
An icon of Mar Addai and Mari, Apostles of the East

In his Ecclesiastical History, Eusebius of Caesarea provides the earliest reference to this text in which he describes an exchange between Jesus Christ and Abgar V in the "language of the Syrians." The Doctrine of Addai itself originated in Edessa, though its author is unknown. It was circulated far and wide, reaching as far as Spain.

== Purpose ==
Helmut Koester regards the development of tradition of Thaddaeus' activity in Edessa as part of an effort to build the authority of the orthodox or Palutian (Note: The group now understood as the orthodox faction was known as the Palutians in Syria at this time. (Koester 1965, p. 305)) faction in Syria against the Manicheans and gnostics, who had an older and stronger presence in the area and traced their lineage to Thomas the Apostle. He considers the Palutian faction to have come to Edessa around 200 CE and only become significant in the fourth century.

== Manuscripts ==
- ms Saint-Petersburg, National Library of Russia Saltykov-Shchedrine, N.S. Syr. 4 (Pigulevskaya 48), f. 1v33
- ms London, British Library, Add. 14654, f. 33r-v (fragment) + Add. 14644, f. 1-9v + Add. 14535, f. 1r (fragment) + Add. 12155, f. 53v + Add. 17193, f. 36v-37 (extrait)
- ms Alqosh, Église paroissiale chaldéenne, cod. 87 ?
- ms London, British Library, Add. 12161, f. 1v (fragment)
- ms London, British Library, Add. 14612, f. 165r (fragment)
- ms London, British Library, Add. 14644, f. 1-9v (mutilated from the beginning and in the middle)
- ms Paris, Bibliothèque nationale, syr. 62, f. 102v-108 (extraits)
- ms Birmingham, Selly Oak College Library, Coll. Mingana, Syr. 405, f. 1
- ms Jerusalem, Couvent syrien orthodoxe Saint-Marc, cod. 153, p. 241-259
- Pseudo-Abdias (x. 1)
- Nicephorus (H. E., ii. 7)

== Published editions ==
- Phillips, George, ed. (1876). The Doctrine of Addai, the apostle (in Syriac). London: Trübner & Co. pp. 51–106.
- Meščerskaja, Elena Nikitična (1984). Legenda ob Avgare — rannesirijskij literaturnyj pamjatnik: istoričeskie korni v ėvoljucii apokrifičeskoj legendy [The Legend of Abgar — early Syrian literary monument: Historical roots and evolution of an apocryphal legend] (in Russian). Moscow: Nauka. pp. 119–184. OCLC 715504370.

== Modern translations ==
=== English ===
- Cureton, William (1864). Ancient Syriac documents relative to earliest establishment of Christianity in Edessa and the neighbouring countries, from the year after our Lord's Ascension to the beginning of the fourth century. London, UK: Williams and Norgate. p. 6–23, 108–109.
- Phillips, George, ed. (1876). The Doctrine of Addai, the apostle. London: Trübner & Co. pp. 1–50. (HTML version)
- Howard, George (1981). The Teaching of Addai: Texts and translations. Early Christian literature series. Chico, CA: Scholars Press. ISBN 978-0-89130-490-6. Note: This includes a reprint of the Syriac edition of Phillips 1876
- Lollar, Jacob A. (2023-11-10). The Doctrine of Addai and the Letters of Jesus and Abgar. Wipf and Stock Publishers. ISBN 978-1-6667-5208-3.

=== Other ===
- Desreumaux, Alain (1993). Histoire du roi Abgar et de Jésus: présentation et trad. du texte syriaque intégral de "La doctrine d'Addaï" [History of King Abgar and Jesus: Presentation and tradition Of the Syriac text of "The Doctrine of Addai"] (in French). Paris: Brepols. pp. 53–117. ISBN 978-2-503-50305-9. This also contains an Ethiopian version.
- Dutch: Jan Willem Drijvers, Helena Augusta, waarheid en legende ( Groningen: Rijksuniversiteit Groningen, 1989), pp: 153–157, Note: partielle
- Russian: Elena Nikitična Meščerskaja, Legenda ob Avgare — rannesirijskij literaturnyj pamjatnik: (istoričeskie korni v ėvoljucii apokrifičeskoj legendy) ( Moskva: Nauka, 1984), pp: 185–203
- Armenian: A Carrière, La légende d'Abgar dans l'Histoire d'Arménie de Moïse de Khoren ( Paris: Imprimerie nationale, 1895), pp: 357–414
- Ethiopic: Getatchew Haile, " The Legend of Abgar in Ethiopic Tradition," Orientalia christiana periodica vol. 55 ( 1989), pp: 375–410

== See also ==
- Abgar Legend
- Holy Qurbana of Addai and Mari
- Early centers of Christianity
