= Apcar =

Apcar may refer to

- Apcar (name), a list of people with the given name or surname
- Apcar family, an Armenian family prominent in commerce and industry
- Apcar and Company, a defunct Indian firm that engaged in shipping, import and export

== See also ==
- Abgar (name), a list of people with the given name or surname
