= Apcar (name) =

Apcar or Abgar (Armenian: Աբգար) is an Armenian name, used as both a surname and given name. Notable people with the name include:

== Given name ==
- Apcar Alexander Apcar (1850–1913), Armenian businessman in India
- Abgar Ali Akbar Armani (died c.1708), Armenian merchant
- Apcar Baltazar (1880–1909), Romanian painter and art critic of Armenian heritage
- Abgar Barsom (born 1977), Swedish-Armenian football player

== Surname ==
- Diana Abgar (1859–1937), Armenian writer and humanitarian
- Frederic Apcar (1914–2008), Russian-born French acrobatic dancer
- Apcar family, an Armenian family prominent in commerce and industry

== See also ==
- Abgar (name), a Syriac given name
- Apgar, a list of people with the given name or surname
