= Birkmyre =

Birkmyre is a rare Scottish toponymic surname originating from Dumfriesshire, deriving from Old Norse elements meaning "birch swamp" or "birch mire." Notable people with the surname include:

- Janet Birkmyre (born 1966), English track cyclist
- Nicholas Birkmyre (born 1937), British rower
- Birkmyre baronets
