= Royal Calcutta Turf Club =

Turf club in Kolkata, India

- Logo of the Royal Calcutta Turf Club

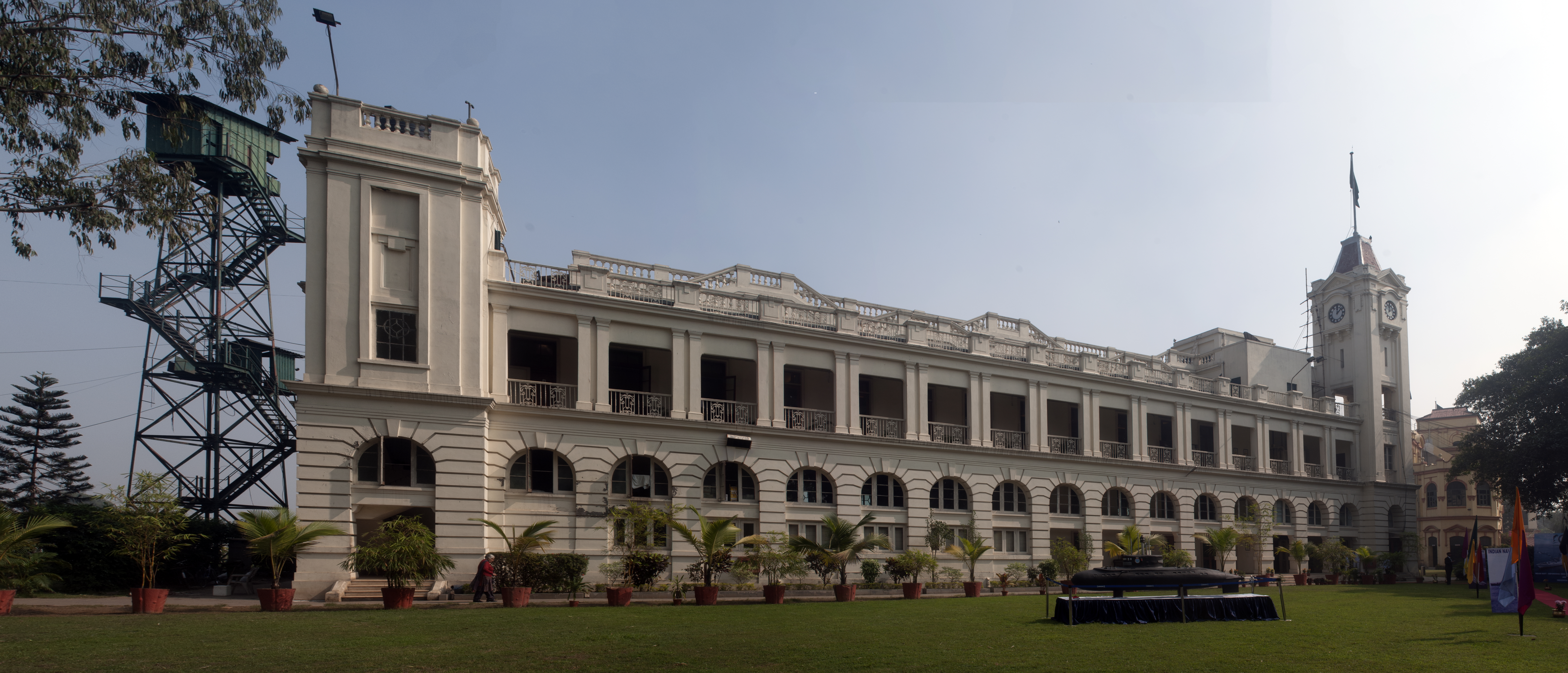
- The Royal Calcutta Turf Club in 2015
- Interactive map of Royal Calcutta Turf Club
- Location: Kolkata, West Bengal, India
- Coordinates: 22.550881°N 88.350865°E
- Date opened: 1847
- Race type: Horse racing
- Course type: Grass

The Royal Calcutta Turf Club (RCTC) is a horse racing organisation which was founded in 1847 in Calcutta, British India (now Kolkata). Horse events and sports were initially organised for the British cavalry at Akra before they were moved to the Maidan. The RCTC became the foremost horse-racing organization in India during the British Raj. At one time it was the governing body for nearly all racecourses in the subcontinent, defining and applying the rules governing the sport. During its heyday, RCTC-organised races were among the most important social events of the bigwigs' calendar and were opened by the Viceroy of India. Still a private club, the RCTC operates Kolkata Race Course in the Maidan.

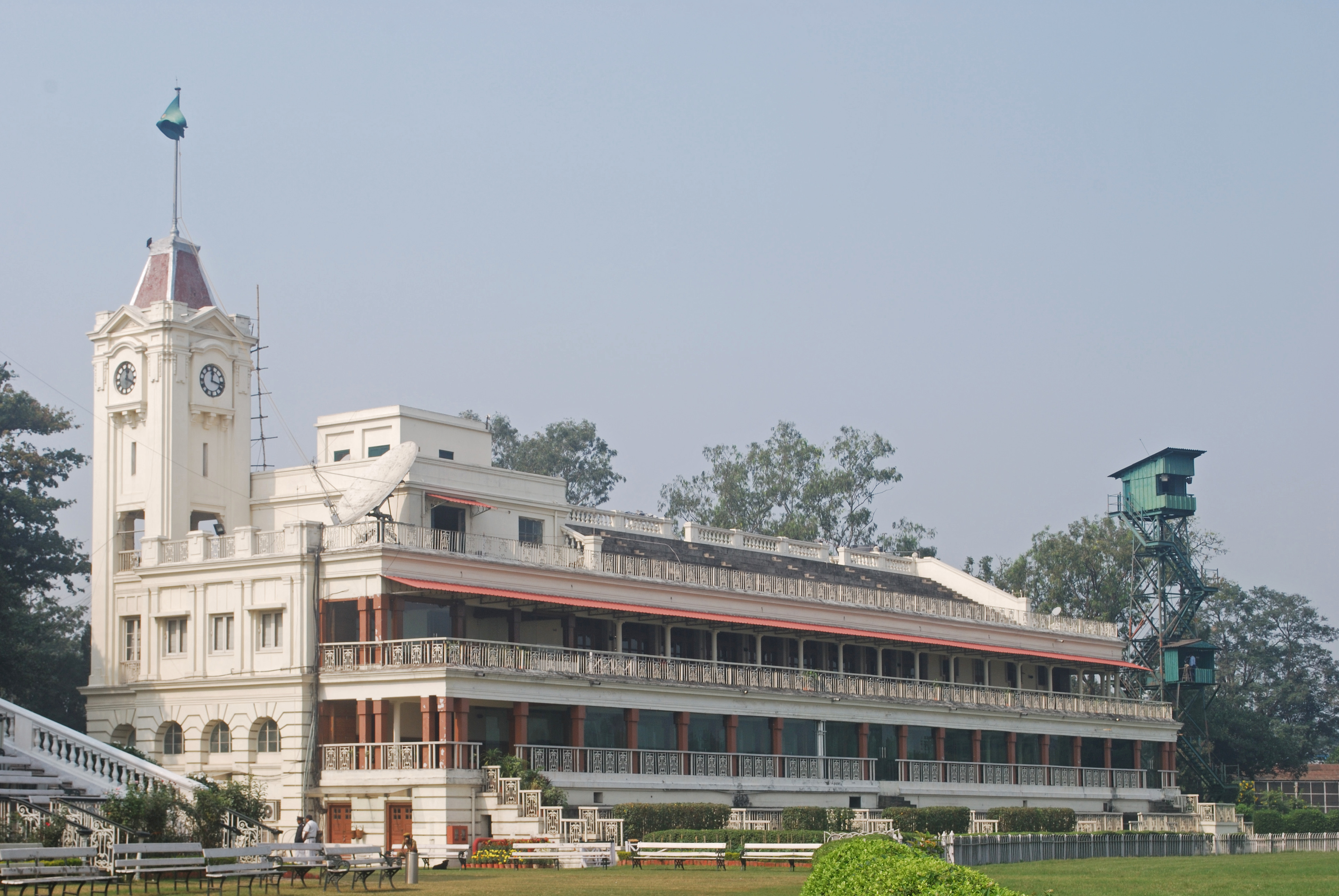
The CTC Grand Stand in 2015

The club also held polo matches during the late 19th century, and hosted English-style gambling; the Calcutta Derby Sweeps, organised by the RCTC, was the world's largest sweepstake in the 1930s. After the closure of the Tollygunge racecourse, a new racecourse was opened by the club in Barrackpore during the 1920s; it was unsuccessful due to poor attendance. Grandstands were built at the Maidan racecourse; Kolkata Race Course had three in 2020, including a three-tier main grandstand.

== Origins ==
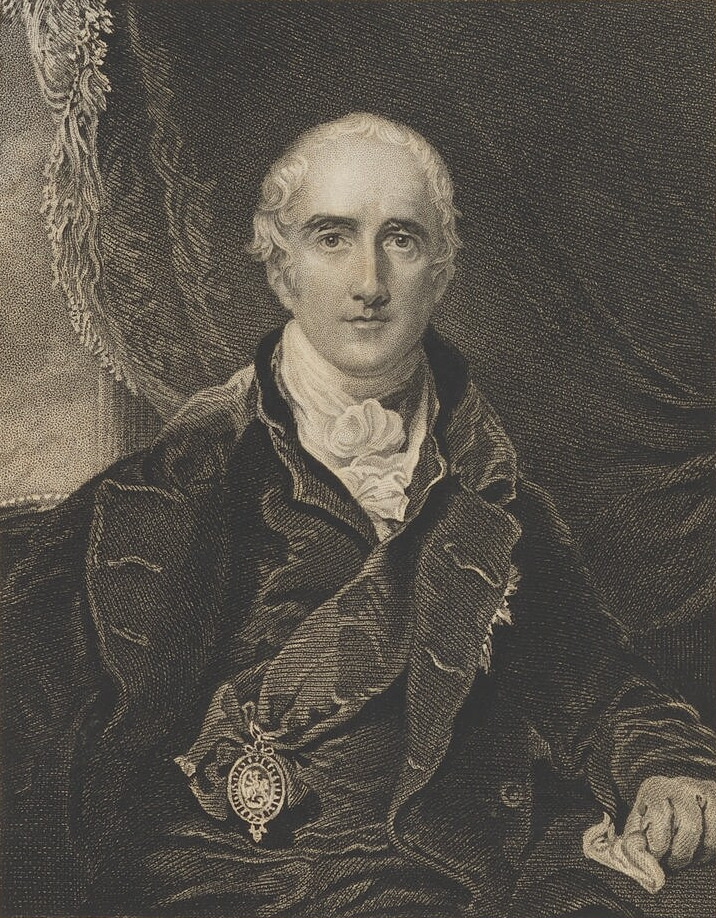
Governor Richard Wellesley disapproved of organised racing, and banned it in 1798.

Calcutta was the first base of British power in India. With its cavalry-based army, sports such as hunting, polo and racing were popular. Organised horse races were first held in India on 16 January 1769 at Akra (near Calcutta), where they continued for the next 40 years. Races were also organised in Garden Reach and Barasat. The first races were on a rough, temporary course wide enough for only four horses. Reformist governor Lord Wellesley disapproved of organised racing and banned horse racing in 1798; but five years later, the Bengal Jockey Club was formed to resume racing at Akra. The races moved to the Calcutta Maidan in 1809, where they have remained. The club laid out a new course in the southwest part of the Maidan in 1812, at approximately present racecourse location. A grandstand was built in 1820, which was later extensively modified.

Races, organised in the relative coolness of the morning (just after sunrise), usually consisted of five 2.5-mile (4.0 km) heats. If a race was not decided in the morning, the heats resumed after sunset. The British press regularly published Calcutta race results. In 1825, the Calcutta Welter (India's main horse-racing event) was moved to the new course. The Calcutta Derby Stakes, in which maiden Arabians ran 2.5-mile (4.0 km) for valuable prizes, began in 1842.

== Foundation and growth ==
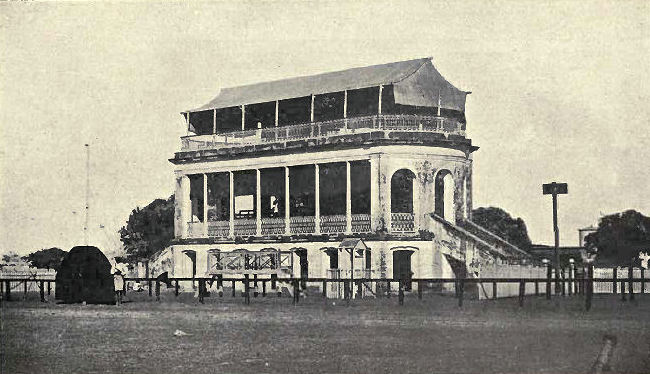
Calcutta Turf Club grandstand before 1905

The Calcutta Turf Club was founded on 20 February 1847 to regulate all aspects of horse racing in the city. Club members were elected by ballot. It was governed by a five-person committee, and five stewards supervised the races. In 1856, the Calcutta Derby was replaced by the Viceroy's Cup. For this race, spectators were admitted by invitation only. Lord Ulrich Browne entered the Calcutta racing scene (which he would dominate) in 1860. Browne redrafted the racing rules and revised the weight-for-age scale. In 1879, the first Monsoon Meeting was organised on a specially-constructed course inside the main course. Public interest in racing increased when races were conducted in the afternoon, and new stands were built in 1880.

The club came to have the same authority as the Jockey Club in England (the arbiter on horse racing in that country), and a notice of a January 1863 race meeting in Muzaffarpur said that it would be conducted under Calcutta Turf Club rules. In 1883 the British House of Lords discussed an accusation against a Surgeon-Major Thornburn by the Lucknow Race Course of gambling irregularities which was upheld by the Calcutta Turf Club. A court of inquiry at Lucknow looked into the accusation and the Judge Advocate General in India analysed and passed it on to the Commander-in-Chief of India confirmed the ruling by the both clubs' stewards. Thorburn, who was refused a court-martial, was forced to return to England and retire. The Calcutta Turf Club was the governing body by 1899 of all of British India and Burma's 52 racecourses except for Bombay (now Mumbai), Poona (now Pune), Karachi and Khelapur (now Kolhapur), which were under the jurisdiction of Bombay's Western India Turf Club.

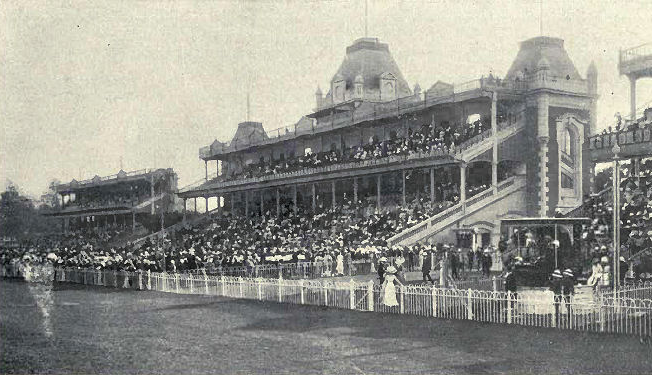
Viceroy's Cup Day, c. 1910

During the 1880s the Calcutta Turf Club conducted polo matches which were open to Indians and Europeans. From 1886 to 1897, Sir William McPherson headed the club. McPherson upgraded the racing rules, and reached an agreement with the Bombay Turf Club that any racecourse in India which held races under the rules was subject to the authority of Calcutta or Bombay. He introduced other changes: jockeys could not bet, and professional handicappers were introduced. Steeplechasing was brought under the club's jurisdiction in 1888. The first Grand National in India was run in 1895 at the course at Tollygunge, and steeplechasing was one of the racing season's main events.

Lord William Beresford, a member of the viceroy's staff, won the Viceroy's Cup in 1881 with his black gelding Camballo and won the cup three more times with Myall King. Apcar Alexander Apcar, a wealthy merchant whose family owned the Apcar Line of steamships, owned some best racehorses and was president of the Calcutta Turf Club. Apcar was a rival of Beresford, who believed in the merits of English Thoroughbreds. His Great Scott won the Viceroy's Cup three times, as did his horse Mayfowl.

At the opening of the Christmas race week (an important social event), the viceroy of India and his wife would drive in state past the grandstand. The Prince of Wales, the future King George V, attended the races in 1905. The Maharaja of Burdwan, Bijay Chand Mahtab, was the first Indian to be elected a full member of the club in 1908.

The new grandstand, built between 1905 and 1907, was open to the public along with stand membership. First timing device was also introduced in 1907. The monsoon track, designed to drain quickly, was added in 1910. The club added "Royal" to its name in 1912, after King George V attended the races for the second time. During the 20th century, the Calcutta Turf Club organised races on 28 days per year. At one time, the club had jurisdiction over 73 racecourses across the Indian subcontinent.

== Later years ==
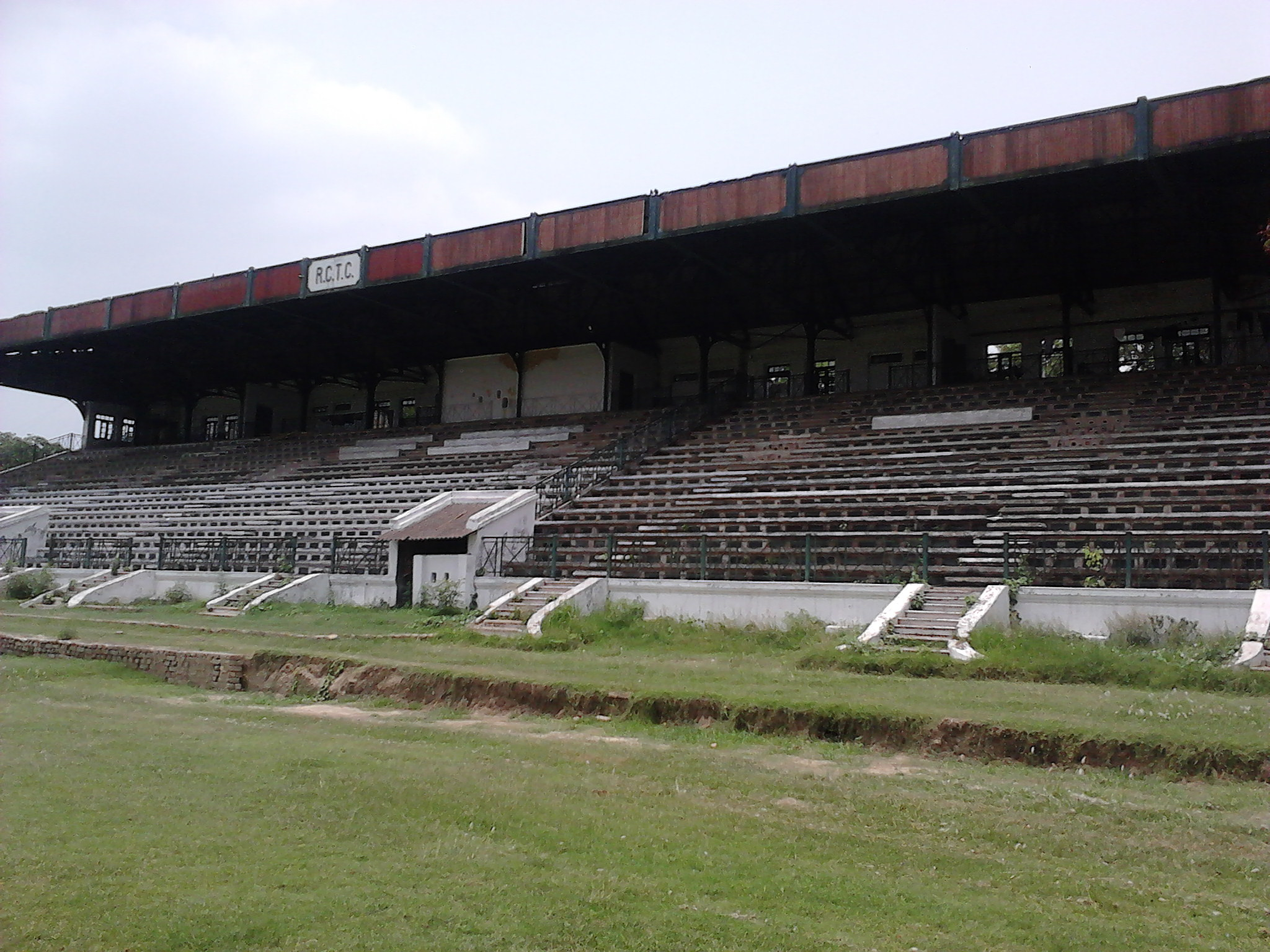
Grandstand of the former Barrackpore racecourse, north of Kolkata

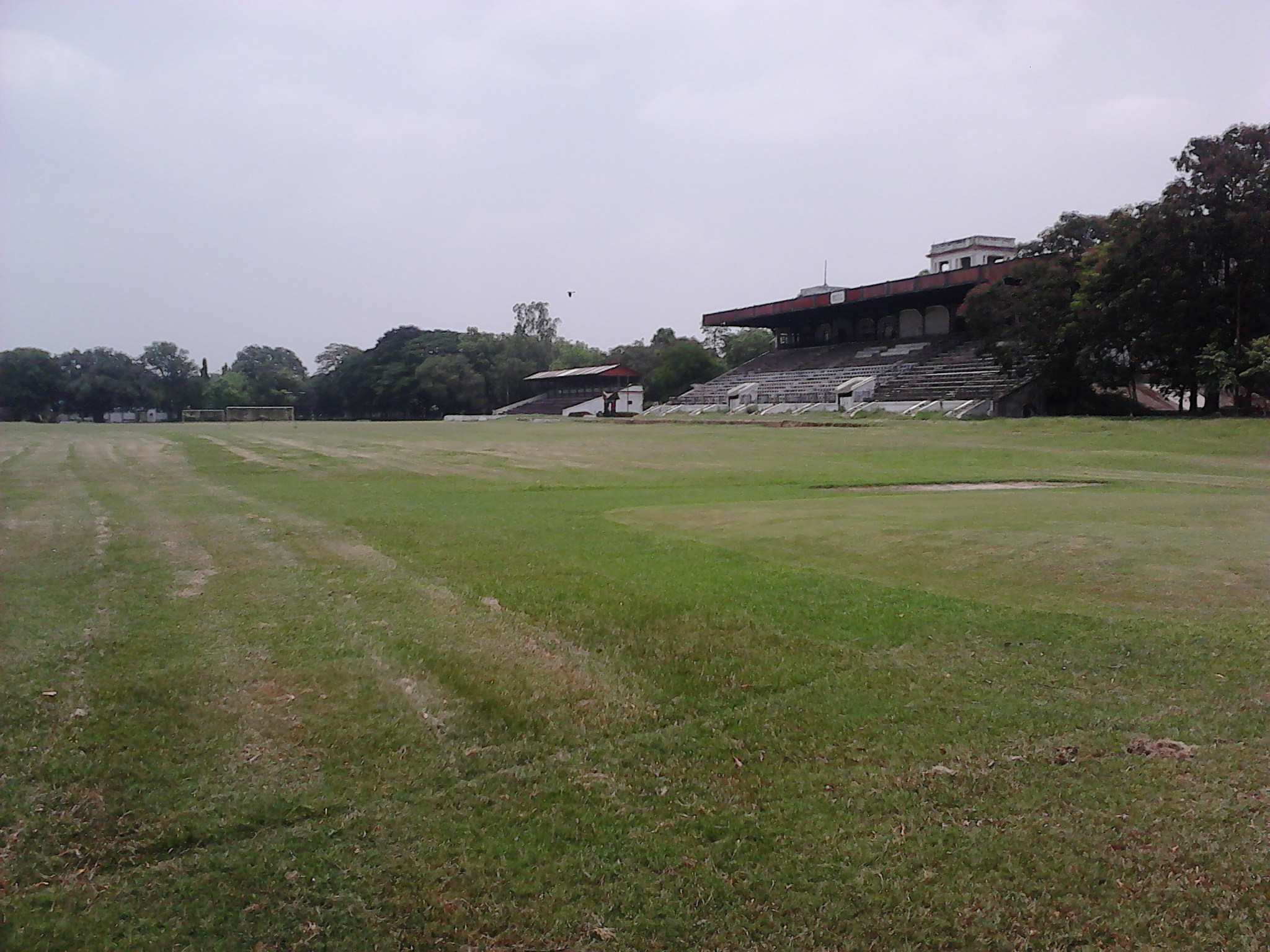
The Barrackpore racecourse in 2012

In 1915, the Tollygunge course closed and its steeplechases were moved to the Maidan course. During the early 1920s, the RCTC became concerned about the lease of the Maidan course and looked for an alternative. Expanding the Tollygunge course was an obvious choice, but the price of adjacent land increased steeply when the plan became known. A site on the north in Barrackpore, which included a racecourse, became available "at a very reasonable price" in 1922. The RCTC decided to build a modern facility with new stands, stables and two courses: a round course and a 6-furlong (1,200 m) straightaway. The large grandstand would be partitioned at first between members and the public; if the course was successful, a members-only grandstand would be built. The railway agreed to provide a spur line for Barrackpore Racecourse railway station to the course for horses and spectators, and the facility was inaugurated on 27 January 1928.

Grand Nationals continued at the Maidan course until 1929, when the race was moved to Lahore. Before World War II, the club looked to Australia rather than England for guidance. The Australian Harvey Roulston was hired as an administrator; the Australian Gray gate was used instead of the English starting flag; Australian jockeys (such as Edgar Britt) moved to Calcutta to ride for the Baroda State maharaja Sayajirao Gaekwad III, and Australian horses were imported. Methods of detecting drugs, such as benzedrine, from urine or blood samples became available during the 1930s. The club rules were updated to require drug tests years before they were introduced by the Jockey Club.

Although the Barrackpore course was generally technically superior to the Maidan course, it did not attract the public and consistently lost money. Races were held until 1941, when it was requisitioned by the army. After the war, the course was rehabilitated and races were run in 1947 and 1948. It was sold to the government in 1954 in an arrangement which included renewing the lease on the Maidan course.

Sir Uday Chand Mahtab became a steward in 1947. He was elected senior steward in 1955, a position he served for 27 years. During the early 1950s, the South India Turf Club (SITC) split off from the RCTC to oversee racing in Bangalore, Madras (Chennai), Hyderabad, Mysore and Ooty. The SITC divided into separate authorities based in Madras, Bangalore and Hyderabad. During the 1970s, these clubs and the original Calcutta and Bombay clubs became a loose association of Indian turf authorities.

In February 1961, Queen Elizabeth II and Prince Philip visited the course and presented the winning trophy. The races were an important social event during the decade, and women dressed glamorously. In 1971, Geoffrey Moorhouse ranked the RCTC on a par with the Bengal Club, the Tollygunge Club and the Calcutta Club.

== Gambling ==
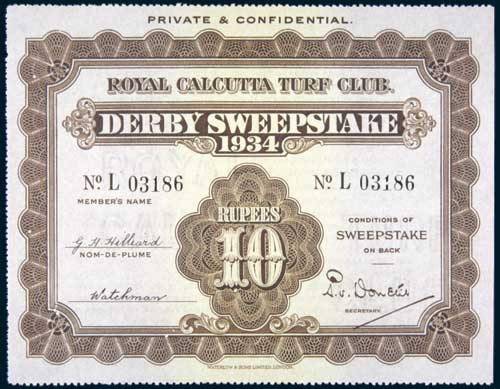
1934 10-rupee Calcutta Derby Sweepstake ticket

The Calcutta Turf Club imported the English practice of gambling on races, and named their Derby and St Leger after the English races. The club was organized, in 1847, partly to regulate such gambling. A mildly-disapproving 1866 account called the betting practices "lotteries". In early Indian horse racing, betting combined a lottery and an auction. One hundred ten-rupee tickets were typically sold, and the money placed in a pot. A ticket was drawn for each horse in the race. These tickets were auctioned, with the ticket holder getting half the winning bid and the other half going into the pot; after the race, the pot was divided among those with tickets for the winning horses. (Note: A Calcutta auction is an American term said to be named after the RCTC auctions. It is a form of betting in which the competitors in a tournament are auctioned off to bidders in a pool. The "owners" of the winning team split their portion of the pool with the players. Golf Calcuttas were often rigged, with golfers faking handicaps or taking bribes to lose. After a fake-handicap scandal in a Calcutta at Deepdale Golf Club, the United States Golf Association outlawed the practice in 1955.) Parimutuel betting began in 1872.

The Calcutta Turf Club Derby draw was started as a private sweepstake in 1887 by Lord William Beresford. Shortly after World War I, the sweepstakes awarded prizes of £75,000, £35,000 and £15,000 for the top three horses in the club's Derby. The Calcutta Derby Sweepstake was well known worldwide, with the pool reaching almost £1 million in 1929 and 1930. Forty percent of the pool went to the first-prize winner, twenty percent to the second and ten percent to the third. Tickets for unplaced horses also received a share, and the club kept 10 percent. (Note: In 1929, London's Stock Exchange Derby Sweepstake had a fund of £5 million and paid two first prizes of £625,000 each. In 1930, the sweepstake was scaled back to 100,000 tickets at £1 each. The New York Sun reported that the Calcutta Derby Sweepstake was the world's largest, with a total fund normally exceeding £4 million. (The Sun may have confused pounds with rupees, which were worth less than 10 percent of a pound.) The winning ticket in 1929 paid Rs 1,600,000, or 40 percent of a Rs 4 million pool. In 1929, the second prize (£62,000) was won by a South African. The winning ticket in 1930 was RR-2859. Seven working men in Barnstaple, England had joined to buy the ticket and sold a half-share before the race; the men won £62,486.) The sweepstake was open only to members of the RCTC, or to friends who could ask members to place a wager. Although methods were developed to make it easier for gamblers in other countries to place bets, the Calcutta Derby Sweepstake could not compete with the Irish Hospitals' Sweepstake (introduced in the 1930s) even though the expected payout was higher.

== Present day ==
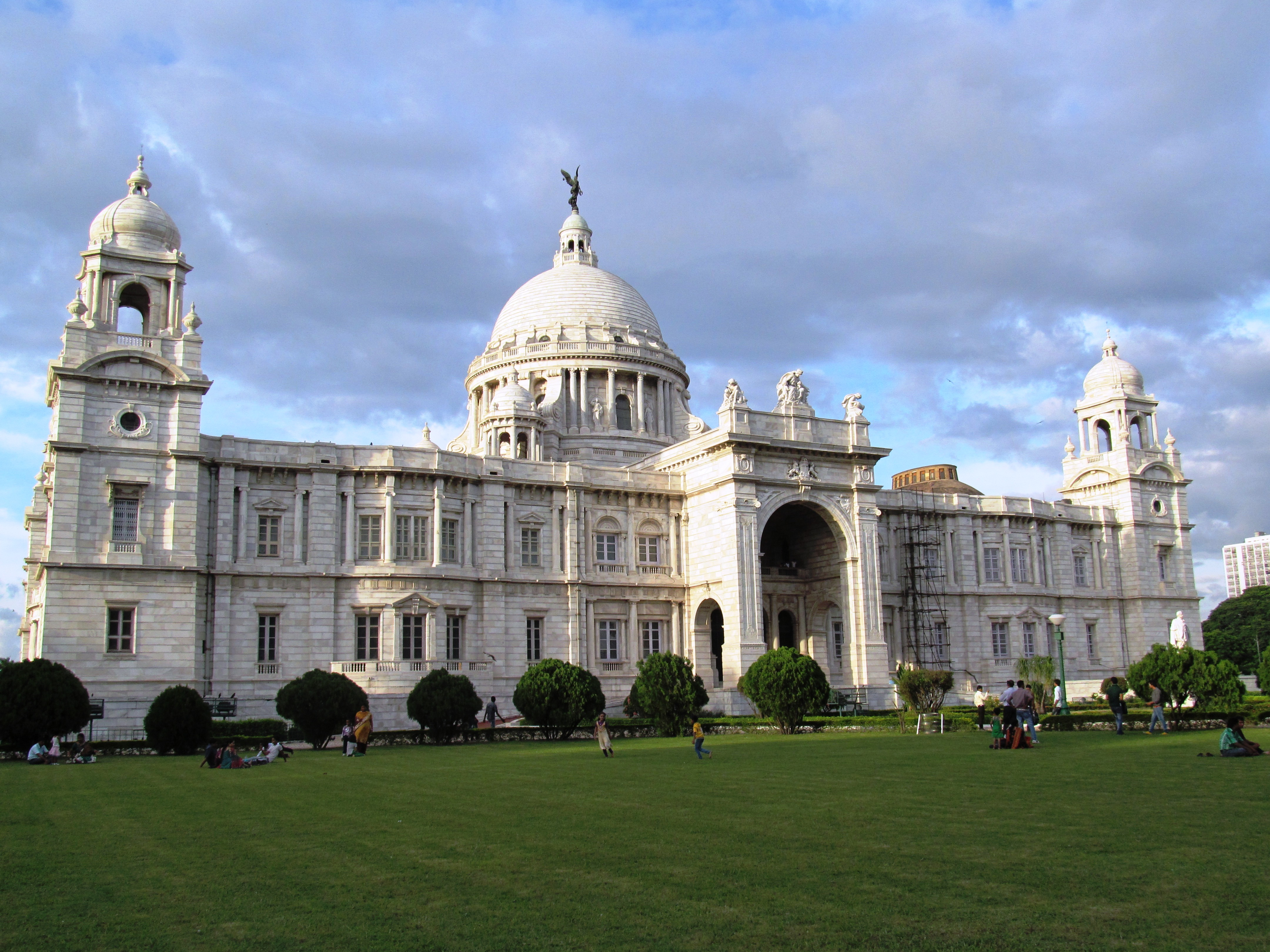
The Victoria Memorial, separated from the racecourse by Hospital Road

The club was housed in the former home of the Apcar family: a two-story, well-maintained Palladian building dating to the early 19th century. The building has a portico on the north side, and a veranda on the south. The ground-level floors are marble, and the doors are made of teak. The two-story vestibule has a carved wooden staircase leading to the upper floor, where the family had their private rooms. The building was at 11 Russell Street; with comfortable leather sofas and armchairs, it was described as an oasis of calm.

The present racecourse has three grandstands. The main pavilion has three tiers, with elaborate turrets and wrought-iron railings. Across the grounds from the grandstand (east of the racecourse) is the Victoria Memorial, a marble monument to Queen Victoria. The grandstands, except for the Members Stand, are now open to the public; Admission to the races is by ticket. Races are primarily held on Saturdays, and sometimes on weekdays. The Monsoon Meet (from July to October) is followed by the Cold Weather Meet, from November to April. The club continues to hold polo matches on the infield of the racecourse.

== Pollution case ==
In March 2017, environmental activist Subhas Datta submitted an application to the National Green Tribunal (NGT) concerning untreated manure released from the club's stables. The application also noted that liquid waste was stressing Kolkata's sewer system and flowing into Adi Ganga, polluting the Hooghly River. In October of that year, the NGT asked Kolkata Municipal Corporation (KMC) to inspect the area; the report said that an open drainage network in the club had outlets to the city's sewer network and Adi Ganga. To minimise pollution and health risks to the people living around the racecourse, the stables in Hastings and the veterinary hospital, the tribunal (following reports by KMC and the West Bengal Pollution Control Board ) directed the club to develop a solid-waste management plan and install a sewage treatment plant in three months; failure to do so would cost the club ₹50,000 (equivalent to ₹70,000 or US$730 in 2023) per day. KMC also suggested diverting the outlets to its effluent-treatment plants. The club was asked to post a ₹50 lakh (equivalent to ₹70 lakh or US$73,000 in 2023) bond with the state pollution-control board. On 28 January 2019, the NGT increased the bond by ₹25 lakh (equivalent to ₹33 lakh or US$35,000 in 2023); the club was cited as a wilful defaulter, since it missed the deadline to complete the project. A month later, the Supreme Court allowed the RCTC to return to the NGT to review the forfeited bond. The tribunal reduced the original amount by 90 percent, and asked the state pollution-control board to refund the remaining ₹45 lakh (equivalent to ₹56 lakh or US$58,000 in 2023); the bond increase was also waived.

== See also ==
- Esplanade, Kolkata
- Horse racing in India
