= John Jardine Paterson =

Scottish businessman

Sir John Valentine Jardine Paterson (14 February 1920 – 12 March 2000) was a Scottish businessman whose career was mostly in India.

He was Chairman of the family firm, Jardine Henderson of Calcutta (closely related to Jardines of Hong Kong), from 1963 to 1967, Chairman of the Indian Jute Mills Association in 1963 and President of the Bengal Chamber of Commerce and Industry in 1966. He joined McLeod Russel PLC in 1967 and was company chairman from 1979 to 1983.

== Life ==
Born at Lockerbie, Dumfriesshire, in 1920, Jardine Paterson was one of the four sons of Robert Jardine Paterson JP (1878–1942) of Balgray, near Lockerbie, a former Coldstream Guards officer, by his marriage to Constance Margaret Steel. The other sons were David (born 1914), Robert Noël (1916–1995), and Arthur James (born 1918). He was educated at Eton and Jesus College, Cambridge.

Jardine Paterson was born into the family which had founded the Jardine Matheson company, although his branch of the family controlled Jardine, Skinner and Company of Calcutta, the Indian division of Jardines, rather than its main business based in Hong Kong. Jardine Skinner & Co. had been established in 1844 by David Jardine of Balgray and had become a major force in the tea, jute and rubber trades. His grandfather, James Jardine Paterson, was the son of Robert Paterson by his marriage to Nancy Jardine, daughter and heiress of David Jardine.

On 1 October 1939, shortly after the outbreak of the Second World War, when he was nineteen, Jardine Paterson received an emergency commission into the Black Watch and served with distinction. On 23 April 1942, during the war, his father died at the age of 64. He resigned his commission on 17 July 1946 and was granted the honorary rank of captain.

After leaving the Army, he joined the family firm, by now renamed Jardine Henderson Ltd, of Calcutta, and was a director of the company from 1952 to 1967, chairman from 1963 to 1967. He was knighted in 1967. A shrewd business man, he had to deal with the tremendous disruptions to trade caused by the partition of India in 1947, and during the years which followed he worked to rebuild the flagging jute industry. He was elected chairman of the Indian Jute Mills Association in 1963 and president of the Bengal Chamber of Commerce and Industry in 1966. He then joined McLeod Russel PLC as a director from 1967 to 1984 and served as company chairman from 1979 to 1983, diversifying the firm's business into property and North Sea oil.

In 1953, Jardine Paterson married Priscilla Mignon Nicolson (1924-2018), the daughter of Sir Kenneth Nicolson MC (1891–1964), another Scottish East India Merchant, and they had one son and three daughters.

He was a member of the Oriental Club and at the time of his death was living in retirement at Norton Bavant Manor in Wiltshire, which had been bought in 1947 by his father-in-law. He died on 12 March 2000.
