= Avgar =

Russian masculine given name

Avgar (Russian: Авга́рь) is an old and rare Russian male first name. Included into various, often handwritten, church calendars throughout the 17th–19th centuries, it was omitted from the official Synodal Menologium at the end of the 19th century. It is derived from the name of several rulers of Osroene (Edessa) in upper Mesopotamia.
