= SS Arratoon Apcar =

19th-century British steamship that is now a wreck in Florida

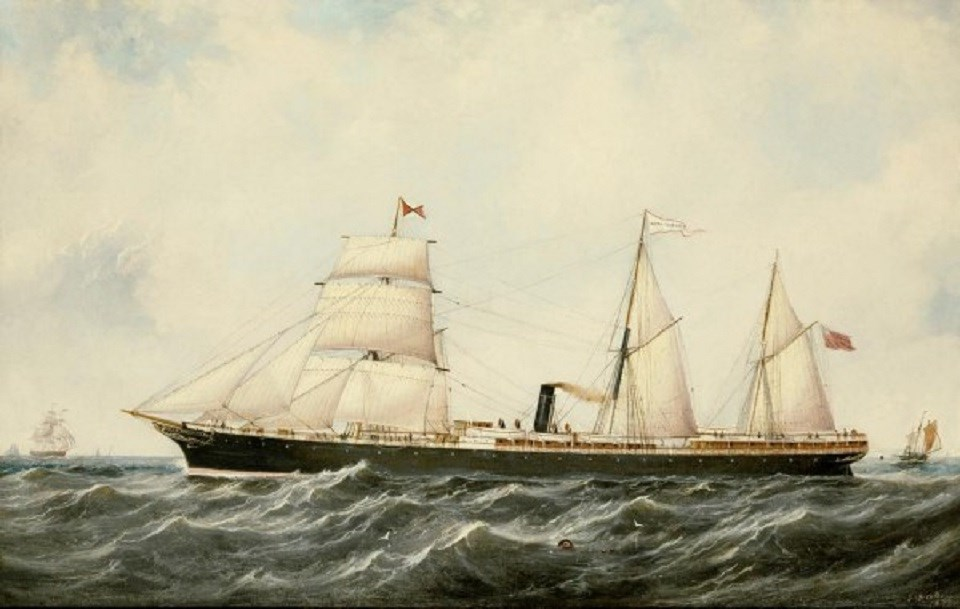
- 1873 painting of Arratoon Apcar by John Scott (1802–85)

History

United Kingdom
- Name: Arratoon Apcar
- Namesake: Alexander Arratoon Apcar
- Owner: 1861: Apcar & Co; 1873: HF Swan & Co
- Port of registry: 1863: Calcutta; 1873: London
- Builder: James Henderson & Son, Renfrew
- Yard number: 36
- Launched: 27 June 1861
- Completed: 1861
- Identification: UK official number 43924; code letters TRBG
- Fate: Wrecked 17 February 1878
- Notes: 25.590283°N 80.096667°W

General characteristics
- Type: iron-hulled sail-steamer
- Tonnage: 1,493 GRT, 959 NRT
- Length: 261.7 ft (79.8 m)
- Beam: 35.1 ft (10.7 m)
- Depth: 25.0 ft (7.6 m)
- Installed power: 1861: 250 NHP; 1873: 160 NHP
- Propulsion: single screw; 1861: steam engine, details unknown; 1873: compound steam engine
- Sail plan: 1873: three-masted barquentine
- Crew: 24

SS Arratoon Apcar was an iron-hulled sail and steam merchant ship that was built in Scotland in 1861 and wrecked off the coast of Florida in 1878. Her wreck in shallow water on Fowey Rocks is now a scuba diving site.

== Building ==
James Henderson & Son built the ship at Renfrew, Scotland, as yard number 36. She was launched on 27 June 1861 and completed that year. Her registered length was 261.7 ft (79.8 m), her beam was 35.1 ft (10.7 m), and her depth was 25.0 ft (7.6 m). Her tonnages were 1,493 GRT and 959 NRT.

She was a sail-steamer. She had three masts, and a steam engine that was rated at 250 NHP.

Her first owner was Apcar and Company of Bombay, India. She was named after the member of the Apcar family who founded the company. She was registered at Calcutta. Her UK official number was 43924 and her code letters were TRBG.

== New engine and owner ==
In 1873 Henry Frederick Swan acquired the ship and registered her in London. Black, Hawthorn & Co of Gateshead re-engined her with a two-cylinder compound engine rated at 160 NHP. By 1873 she was rigged as a barquentine. Apcar & Co replaced her with a larger ship of the same name.

== Wreck ==
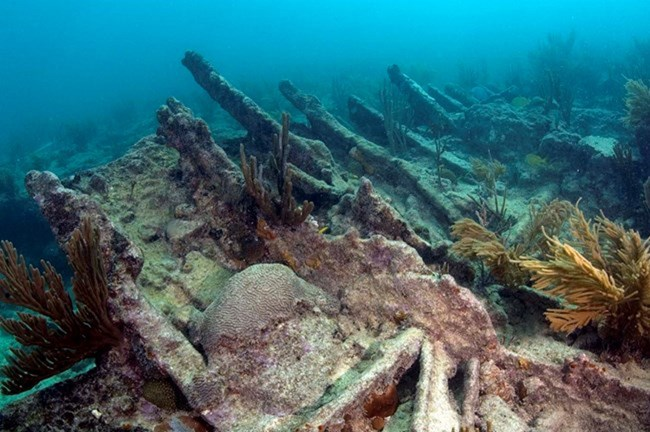
Part of the wreck

In February 1878 Arratoon Apcar was en route from Liverpool, England to Havana, Cuba with a cargo of coal. On 17 February 1878 she grounded on Fowey Rocks off of Hawk Channel, due to a miscalculation by her Master, Captain Pottinger.

Other ships had already been wrecked on the reef. The Fowey Rocks Light was being built at the time, and construction workers were camped on a platform on the new screw pilings for the lighthouse. They were almost hit by the ship, which stopped on the rocks only 200 yards (180 m) away.

The ship's crew spent three days trying to pump her out before abandoning her and heading ashore in her lifeboats. The Tappahannock rescued Captain Pottinger and his entire crew of 24 men. Heavy seas pushed the ship onto the reef, breaking her on the rocks. She was a total loss by 12 March 1878.

== Mistaken identity ==
The wreck now tentatively identified as the Arratoon Apcar was known for many years as Arakanapka, and is so called in books and on various dive-related web sites.

== Wreck ==
The wreck is at a depth of 10 to 20 feet (3 to 6 m) near Fowey Rocks. The lower hull and iron frames of the ship are visible, encrusted with coral, along with remains of some other parts of the ship. There are many fish, and with shallow water the site is excellent for snorkelling or diving. However, the shallow waters near the reef may create strong surges that could damage a boat. Arratoon Apcar is one of five historic wrecks in the Biscayne National Park "Shipwreck Trail".
