= Apcar Alexander Apcar =

Businessman in Calcutta, India (1850–1913)

Sir Apcar Alexander Apcar, KCSI
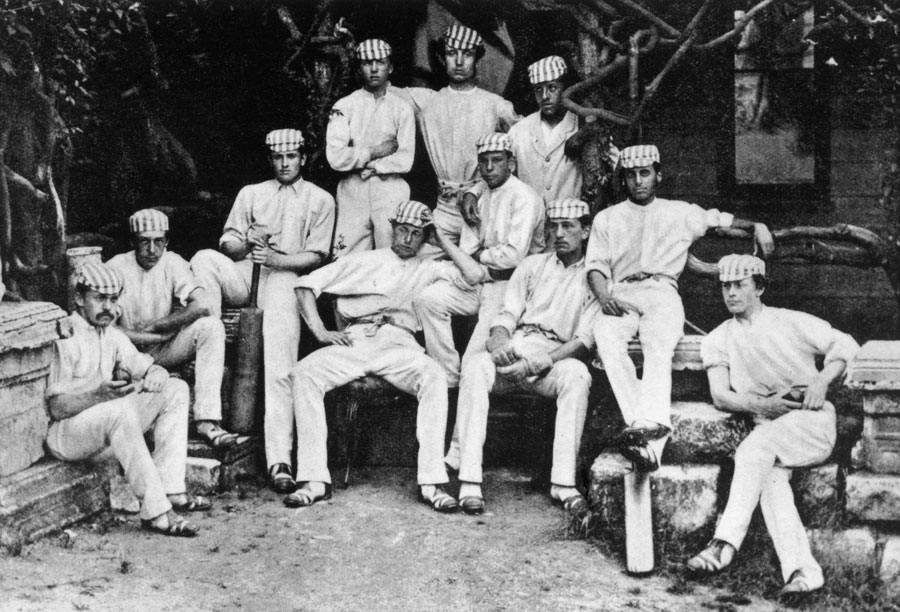
- Born: 1851; Calcutta, Bengal, India
- Died: 17 April 1913 (aged 62); Bangalore, Mysore, India
- Occupation: Merchant

Sir Apcar Alexander Apcar KCSI (1851 – 17 April 1913) was a wealthy Armenian businessman in Calcutta (now Kolkata), India. His family had made their fortune in the opium trade with China. He was president of the Bengal Chamber of Commerce, sat on the Imperial Legislative Council, and in 1903 was knighted. He owned a racehorse stud, and for several years was the leading figure in the Indian racing world.

== Early years ==
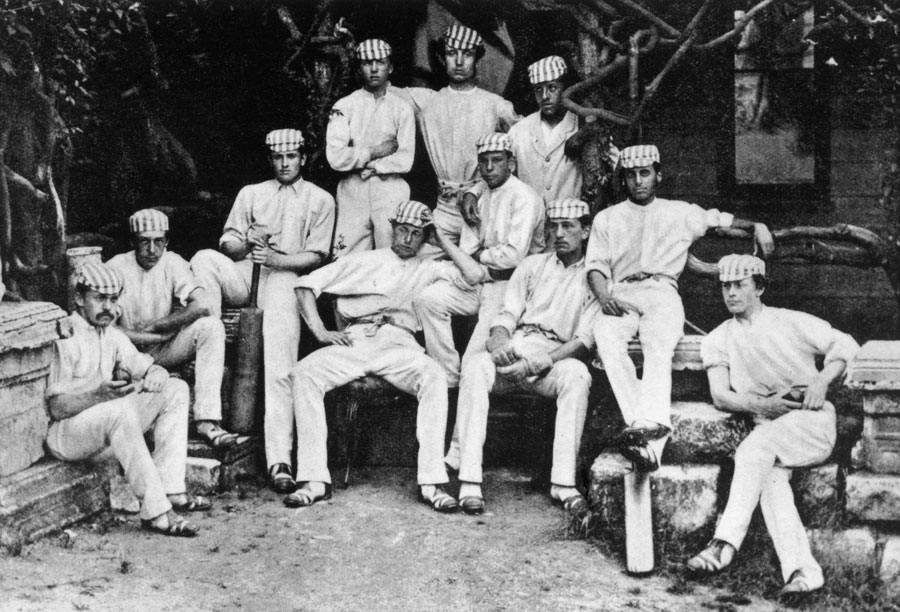
Harrow cricket XI during the match against Eton in 1869. A. A. Apcar is second from the right.

Apcar Alexander Apcar was of Armenian origin, from a family that settled in Bengal in the early 19th century. His family owned Apcar and Company, which ran a steamship line trading between Calcutta and the treaty ports of China and made its fortune in the Chinese opium trade.

He was the second son of Apcar Aratoon Apcar, a merchant whose Apcar Line of steamers traded with Burma, the Straits Settlements and the Far East.

Apcar Alexander Apcar was born in Calcutta in 1851. He was educated at Harrow, where he was a contemporary of Lord Curzon. He played for his school on the cricket XI in various matches between May 1868 and July 1869, including matches with Eton College, Marylebone Cricket Club and I Zingari.

His performance was not exceptional. After returning to Calcutta he became a notable rackets player and cricketer.

== Businessman ==
Alexander Apcar's father died on 16 May 1863 at the age of 85. Alexander became head of the family firm after the death of his three elder brothers, Apcar, Seth and Thomas.

Apcar continued the family trading business, living at their home in Russell Street, where he entertained many people. (Note: The Calcutta Turf Club is now housed in the former home of the Apcars, a two-story Palladian-style building dating to the early 19th century and maintained in perfect condition. The building has a portico on the north side and a veranda on the south. The floors of the ground level are marble, and the doors made of teak. The vestibule is two stories high, with an elegantly carved wooden staircase leading to the upper floor where the family had their private rooms.)

The building is at 11 Russell Street. For many years Apcar was the consul for Siam in Calcutta. He was vice-president of the Bengal Chamber of Commerce in 1903, and its president from 1904 to 1907.

He represented the Chamber of Commerce in the Viceregal Legislative Council from 1900 to 1909, in the Bengal Legislative Council and in the Port Trust. In 1903, he was made a C.S.I., and later that year was knighted at a Royal Durbar in Delhi.

== Horse racing ==
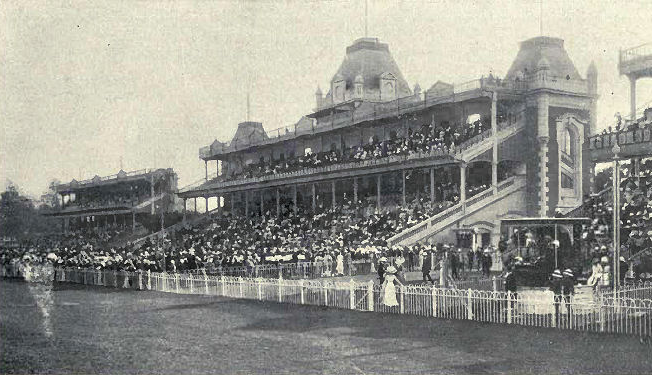
Royal Calcutta Turf Club Race Stands on Viceroy's Cup Day, c.1910. Apcar was influential in having the stands built.

Apcar owned a horse breeding farm in Australia, producing a stud of race horses. He used to keep his horses at Bangalore in the summer, where it was relatively cool, and in the later part of his life spent most of the hot season there.

For some time he was president of the Calcutta Turf Club. Afterwards he was an honorary steward. He played a large role in having a new grandstand erected at the club's racecourse, modeled on the Longchamp Racecourse grandstand. The stands were built between 1905 and 1907, and stand membership was opened to the public.

Apcar raced as a partner of Malcolm Peter Gaspar, also of Armenian origin. They were great rivals of Lord William Beresford, who strongly believed in the merits of English thoroughbreds. In his later years he raced his horses in venues at Poona, Bombay and Bangalore. After Beresford retired Apcar was the leading racer in India. His Great Scott won the Viceroy's Cup three times, as did his Mayfowl.

Apcar died in Bangalore on 17 April 1913 at the age of 62. He was unmarried, and was succeeded by a doctor cousin.

== See also ==
- Apcar family
