= Jardine, Skinner and Company =

Trading company based in Calcutta, India

Jardine Skinner & Co., Jardine Henderson Ltd.
- Industry: Trading
- Founded: 1825
- Defunct: 1946
- Fate: Merged into Jardine Henderson
- Successor: Jardine Henderson Limited
- Headquarters: Calcutta, India
- Area served: Britain, India, China
- Products: Textiles, opium, tea etc.

Jardine, Skinner and Company was a trading company based in Calcutta, India. It was founded in 1825, initially dealing in textiles. Later it branched out into opium, tea, timber and petroleum.

The company was closely associated with Matheson & Company of London and Jardine Matheson & Co of Hong Kong.

== Early years ==
Jardine, Skinner & Co. was founded in 1825 in Bombay. The early partners of Jardine Skinner were from Scotland, as were the partners of many of the British managing agencies of Bombay and Calcutta. Kinship ties were important, with new members often drawn from Scottish relatives.

In 1844 the company was reformed in Calcutta by David Jardine and Charles B. Skinner. David Jardine (1819–1853) was the eldest son of William Jardine's sister Margaret.

Jardine Skinner was a merchant and also became a shipping agent and shareholder in shipping companies. The company imported cotton goods from Manchester and Glasgow, and exported indigo, silk, and later jute. Their agents in Glasgow were James Ewing & Co., and their agents in Manchester were Matheson & Scott. The latter was associated with Matheson & Company of London and Jardine Matheson of Hong Kong. Jardine Skinner and Jardine Matheson were not legally connected, although both used the facilities of Matheson & Co., which James Matheson founded in 1848 after he returned from China.

== Opium trade ==
With high levels of competition in the textile trade, Jardine Skinner earned additional income by shipping opium to Jardine Matheson in China. While Jardines carried opium for the larger suppliers, Apcar and Company catered to many smaller local dealers. With slower boats, the Apcars charged much lower rates than Jardines, ranging from Rs8 to Rs10 per chest compared to upward of Rs28 per chest charged by Jardines. The Apcars and Jardine Skinner also exported opium to Singapore for use by the Chinese in the Malay Peninsula or for distribution to other locations in southeast Asia.

There were two types of opium, Bengal opium and Malwa opium, produced by private growers in central India and Rajputana. In the early years Jardine Skinner had to deal with fluctuations in both quality and quantity, but strict controls later helped standardize the product. In 1856 a risk emerged from P&O, who appeared to be trying to enter and dominate the opium trade by undercutting the rival companies. The companies managed to strike a deal to retain the current rates. By 1860 Jardine Skinner and Jardine Matheson dominated the opium trade.

== Later expansion ==
Jardine Skinner was one of the more prosperous of the British trading houses in India, but was relatively small. In the 1845–48 period it operated with a liquid capital of just £100,000. In the 1850s the company was the agent for the large Glasgow merchant house of J & A Dennistoun, which was active in England, France, the US and Australia. In the late 1850s Matheson & Co. was appointed Jardine-Skinner's principal agent in London, handling imports of commodities such as tea, rice, silk, cotton, jute and indigo. In the early 1860s Jardine Skinner represented J. Ewing and Company of Glasgow, the turkey-red dyers.

By 1860 Jardine Skinner were conducting a large trade in tea, and later they expanded into timber and petroleum. Jardine Skinner entered into joint ownership arrangements with Matheson & Co. of a number of tea estates in the early 1860s.

In the 1880s Jardine Skinner was profitable, but only making a return of 2% – 3% on capital. The original indigo and silk filature businesses were no longer profitable, and the company was looking for new ways to deploy its capital. Capital rose to £1.3 million by 1890. The company had to weather financial crises in 1848 and 1866, supported by credit from Matheson & Co., and in 1890 returned the favor when Matheson found itself in difficulty.

The company was among the most influential of the agency houses that dominated the Bengal Chamber of Commerce, after Andrew Yule and Company and Bird and Company. By 1890 Jardine Skinner controlled six jute mill companies out of a total of 21 in India. With ample capital, the company was having difficulty finding investment opportunities.

Jardine Skinner was the fourth largest jute mills operator in 1910–11 after Bird & Co., Thomas Duff & Co. and Andrew Yule. The jute trade suffered at times from oversupply. Jardine Skinner was among the major Calcutta firms whose representatives met in London on 10 October 1911 to discuss setting up a cartel to regulate the trade.

In the early 20th century the laws governing companies in India were relaxed, making it possible for firms like Jardine Skinner to control large numbers of publicly traded enterprises with very little capital outlay. Jardine Skinner would typically run the companies they controlled as if they were subsidiaries, dispensing with boards of directors.

In 1946 Jardine Skinner merged with George Henderson to form Jardine Henderson. At first the Jardine and Stuart families controlled the new firm, although some Indian families held 40% of the shares. In the early 1970s a large number of shares were transferred to Indians as the main British shareholders died. Several British shareholders of the company remain to this day.

As of 2016 Jardine Henderson had pan-India pest control operations, headquartered in Kolkata. The company also had interests in real estate, mining, engineering tea gardens and marketing, carton manufacturing and printing, through Shalimar Paints, Bellis India, Color Cartons Limited, Diamond Products and Packaging Limited, Rydak Syndicate, and others, some of which it continues to operate.
