= Matheson & Company =

London based trading house (1848–1912)

- Industry: Trade, Finance
- Founded: London, England (1848)
- Founder: James Matheson
- Fate: Acquired by Jardine Matheson in 1912
- Headquarters: London, England
- Area served: Britain, India, China, Spain, East Africa etc.

Matheson & Company was a London-based trading house closely associated with Jardine Matheson of Hong Kong and Jardine Skinner of Calcutta. It arranged finance and handled imports from those two companies of products such as tea, silk and jute. Matheson & Company also became involved in venture-capital, specializing in mining. The company was a member of the consortium that formed the Rio Tinto Company Limited. After 1912 it became a subsidiary of Jardine Matheson.

== Foundation ==
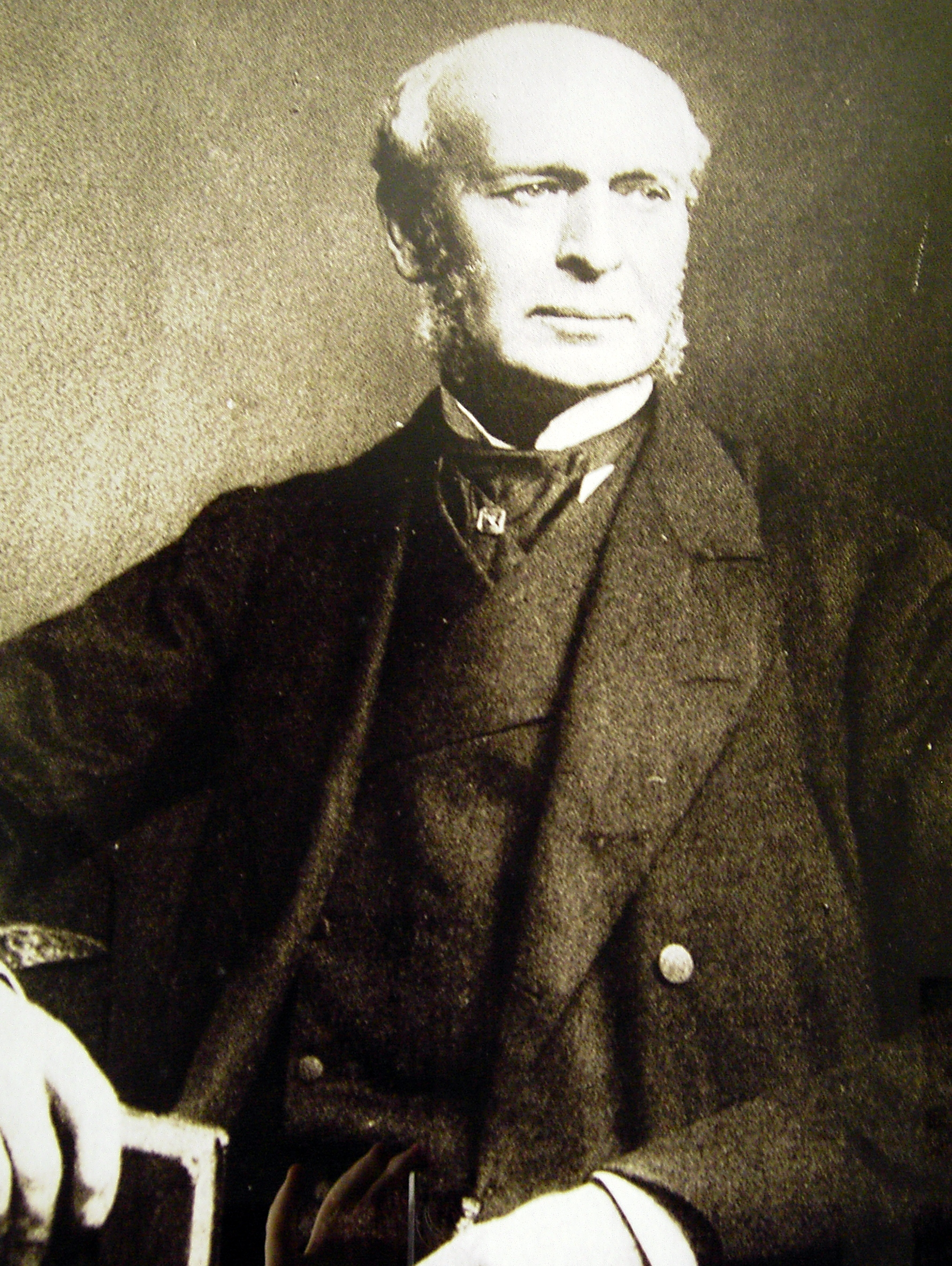
Hugh Matheson (1821 - 1898)

James Matheson, one of the two founders of the Hong Kong-based Jardine Matheson trading company, founded Matheson & Company in 1848 after he returned from China. The company was created in a reorganization of Magniac-Jardine and Company, which had come close to liquidation in the 1847 financial crisis. From 1848 until he died in 1898, the senior partner of Matheson and Company was Hugh Matheson. Hugh was the nephew of James Matheson. In 1843 his uncle had invited him to join Jardine Matheson in Hong Kong, but he declined due to moral scruples about that firm's involvement in the opium trade. Instead he had joined Magniac-Jardine, Jardine Matheson's London correspondents.

== Trader ==
Matheson and Company expanded under Hugh Matheson. The company's primary business in China on behalf of Jardine-Matheson was the importation of tea and silk. Hugh Matheson expanded these products as the company started shipping coal and boilers. Matheson and Company also entered into the larger business of buying up surplus cotton goods in Liverpool and Manchester and shipping them to China, where Jardine Matheson arranged for their sale to local dealers. William Keswick, a relative of the Jardines, spent some time with Matheson and Company before going to China in 1855 to work for Jardine Matheson, where he rose to become the chief executive in Hong Kong, and later to run the entire company from London, reporting only to Sir Robert Jardine.

Jardine Skinner was not legally connected to Jardine Matheson, although both used the facilities of Matheson & Company. Jardine Skinner's agents in Manchester were Matheson & Scott, who were associated with Matheson & Company. In the late 1850s Matheson and Company was appointed Jardine Skinner's principal agent in London, handling imports of commodities such as tea, rice, silk, cotton, jute and indigo. Jardine Skinner entered into joint ownership arrangements with Matheson & Co. of a number of tea estates in the early 1860s. Jardine Skinner had to weather financial crises in 1848 and 1866, supported by credit from Matheson & Co., and in 1890 returned the favor when Matheson found itself in difficulty.

== Investor ==
Between the 1860s and 1914, while acting as London representatives of Jardine Skinner and Jardine Matheson, Matheson & Co. also moved into international venture capital investments, particularly in mining. In February 1873 Hugh Matheson obtained agreement from the Spanish government to sell the Rio Tinto mines on the Rio Tinto in Huelva, Spain, to a syndicate he had arranged. This was made up of Matheson (24%), Deutsche Bank (56%) and the railway construction company Clark, Punchard (20%). The Rio Tinto Company was launched on 28 March 1873, headed by Hugh Matheson. Hugh Matheson and his financial partners controlled Rio Tinto until the late 1880s, when the London and Paris Rothschilds gained control. Matheson & Company also invested in copper mining in California and gold mining in South Africa. With less success, the company invested in oil production in Peru and in the 1900s in mining opportunities in Russia.

== Subsidiary ==
In 1912 the interests of the Matheson family were bought out, and from then on it had the same shareholders as Jardine Matheson. After World War I (1914-1918) Matheson & Company generally withdrew from venture capital opportunities and focused on providing banking and merchanting services in London for Jardines. However, after 1936 the company did make various minor investments in East Africa. In 1947, Jardine Matheson and Company also represented Westinghouse Inc. as agent in Taiwan, supplying the country's boiler tube requirement for its railway engines.

For tax purposes, Matheson & Co. was a subsidiary of Jardine Matheson. In practice, the proprietors in Scotland made the decisions and transmitted them to Hong Kong through the London office. As London grew as an international financial hub, in the 1960s Matheson & Co. expanded their merchant banking operations.
