= Alec Ogilvie (businessman) =

British business executive

For the early aviation pioneer, see Alec Ogilvie.

Sir Alec Drummond Ogilvie (1913–1997) was a British business executive.

Ogilvie spent his childhood in Bengal, India, where his father, Sir George Ogilvie, was a civil servant. Ogilvie was the fifth generation in his family to have lived in India.

Educated in Cheltenham College and trained as an accountant in Glasgow, Ogilvie worked in London for three years, before returning to India in 1935 and joining the Andrew Yule company in Calcutta (now Kolkata). Ogilvie became the chairman of Andrew Yule, and also served as president of the Bengal Chamber of Commerce and Industry and president of the Associated Chambers of Commerce. (ASSOCHAM).

Ogilvie was knighted for his services to British business interests in India in 1965. He later returned to Britain and served as chairman of Powell Duffryn (now known as PD Ports).

During the Second World War, Ogilvie had joined the 2nd King Edward VII's Own Gurkha Rifles and was held prisoner of war in Singapore, in Changi prison.
