= Apcar and Company =

Indian trading firm

- Industry: Shipping
- Founded: Bombay, India (1819)
- Founder: Arratoon Apcar
- Defunct: January 27, 1912
- Fate: Purchased by the British-India Steam Navigation Company
- Headquarters: Calcutta, India
- Area served: India, Southeast Asia, Far East

Apcar and Company was a firm founded in 1819 in India that engaged in shipping, import and export. The most profitable trade was in opium, shipped from India to Hong Kong and the Pearl River. The Apcar Line also carried Indian and Chinese laborers for work in Malaya and Singapore. The line was sold to the British India Steam Navigation Company in 1912.

== Origins ==
Arratoon Apcar was an ethnic Armenian born in 1779 at New Julfa in Isfahan, Persia. He was the second son of Apcar, the ancestor of the family. He came to Bombay when he was sixteen and found employment with an Armenian merchant there, trading with China and Manila. After his patron died, he continued in this trade in his own right. His brother Gregory Apcar came to India in 1808 and joined Arratoon in Bombay. The trading company of Apcar & Co. was founded in 1819 by Arratoon Apcar.

== Growth ==
Arratoon Apcar moved his company to Calcutta around the end of 1830. In Calcutta the company moved into shipping, carrying both passengers and freight. The most profitable cargo was opium. Until P&O began shipping opium from Calcutta in 1851, the trade was divided between Jardine, Skinner and the Apcar Line. Even then, P&O had limited shipping capacity. While Jardines carried opium for the larger suppliers, the Apcars with their Arratoon Apcar and Catherine Apcar sailing boats catered to many smaller local dealers. With slower boats, they charged much lower rates than Jardine Skinner, ranging from Rs8 to Rs10 per chest compared to upward of Rs28 per chest charged by Jardine Skinner. However, the Apcars may have had private arrangements with the dealers that locked them into using Apcar services.

The Apcar Line's fleet became well-respected, efficiently carrying both cargo and Chinese coolies, mostly between Singapore, Hong Kong and Amoy, but also making regular voyages to Japan. From 1855 Apcar & Co. started to convert their fleet to steam. The Apcar Line was providing regular service to Singapore from 1856. The Apcar clippers dominated the opium trade until the 1870s, carrying their cargoes from Bombay or Calcutta, with a stop in Singapore, on to Hong Kong or the Canton River. 43 voyages of opium ships to China were listed in 1865, of which 17 were Apcar ships. The Apcars and Jardine Skinner exported opium to Singapore for use by the Chinese in the Malay Peninsula or for distribution to other locations in southeast Asia. Eventually the Apcars were forced out of the Dutch East Indies by protectionist measures. Between 1875 and 1880 Captain Chapman James Clare (1853–1940) served on Apcar & Co. opium steamers trading between Hong Kong and Calcutta.

In the 1880s the Apcar Line was sailing monthly from Calcutta to Hong Kong via Penang and Singapore. On 22 May 1888 the steamship Arratoon Apcar collided with the steamship Hebe in the Strait of Malacca, with both ships suffering considerable damage. Both vessels were held to have been at fault. In 1901 the firm of David Sassoon, Sons & Co. were still the agents in Hong Kong of the Apcar Line. They maintained this agency after the purchase of the Apcar Line by the British India Steam Navigation Company.

== Family interests ==
In 1843 Arratoon Apcar founded the Armenian Patriotic School in his home town of New Julfa in Isfahan, Persia. The school was entirely funded by Apcar & Co. The Apcars also owned collieries. Sitarampur Colliery was opened by Apcar & Company around 1846. In 1865 Apcar was working a seam of coal 13 feet (4.0 m) deep near Charanpur. They had another mine at Sitarampur, a seam said to be 12 feet (3.7 m) deep and excellent in quality.

Gregory Apcar worked for Apcar & Co. until his death on 23 June 1847 at the age of 52. Arratoon Apcar died on 16 May 1863 at the age of 85. Apcar Alexander Apcar (1850–1913), grandson of Arratoon Apcar, became head of the family firm after the death of his three elder brothers, Apcar, Seth and Thomas. He continued the family trading business, living at their home in Russell Street, where he entertained many people. He was vice-president of the Bengal Chamber of Commerce in 1903, and its president from 1904 to 1907. He represented the Chamber of Commerce in the Viceregal Legislative Council from 1900 to 1909, in the Bengal Legislative Council and in the Port Trust. In 1903 he was made a Companion of the Order of the Star of India (C.S.I.), and later that year was knighted at a Royal Durbar in Delhi.

On 27 February 1912 Apcar & Co, ships, workshops and mines, were sold to the British-India Steam Navigation Company for Rs 800,000.

== Fleet ==
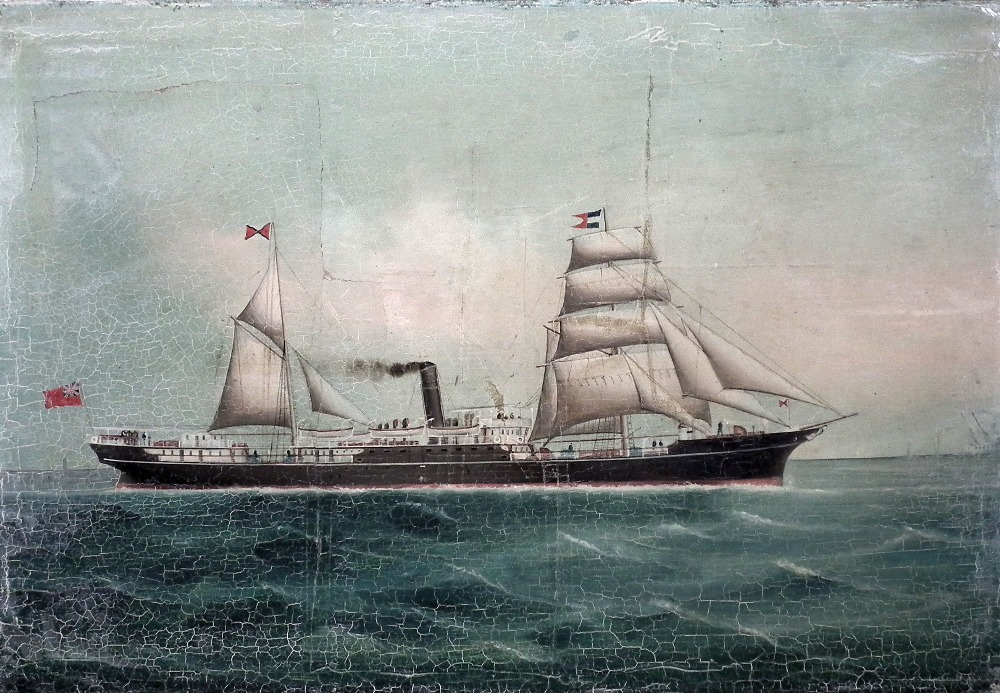
S.S. Catherine Apcar (1893)

The Arratoon Apcar, a 275-ton brig, began making regular voyages in the mid-1840s between Calcutta, Penang, Singapore and China, taking about two months each way. After a few years the company added the Ararat and the 400-ton Catherine Apcar, which was named after the wife of Arratoon Apcar. In 1846 Apcar and Company had three of the eleven tugs operating at Calcutta, one of 120 hp and two of 150 hp. The first steam clippers added to the fleet were the 315-ton (673 grt) Lightning in 1855 and 593-ton (947 grt) Thunder. These were followed by the 938-ton Arratoon Apcar and the Armenia in 1858. In 1861 the 204-ton Thunder, a screw-driven steam ship, made the journey from Hong Kong to Singapore in just five days. A great cyclone hit Calcutta on 4 October 1864. It caused great damage to the shipping in the harbor. Apcar & Co.'s Thunder was driven onto the Strand at the foot of Hastings Street.

SS Arratoon Apcar was an iron-hulled steamship with a 1,480 ton displacement built in Renfrew, Scotland, 1861. She was sold in 1872 to H.F. Swan Company.

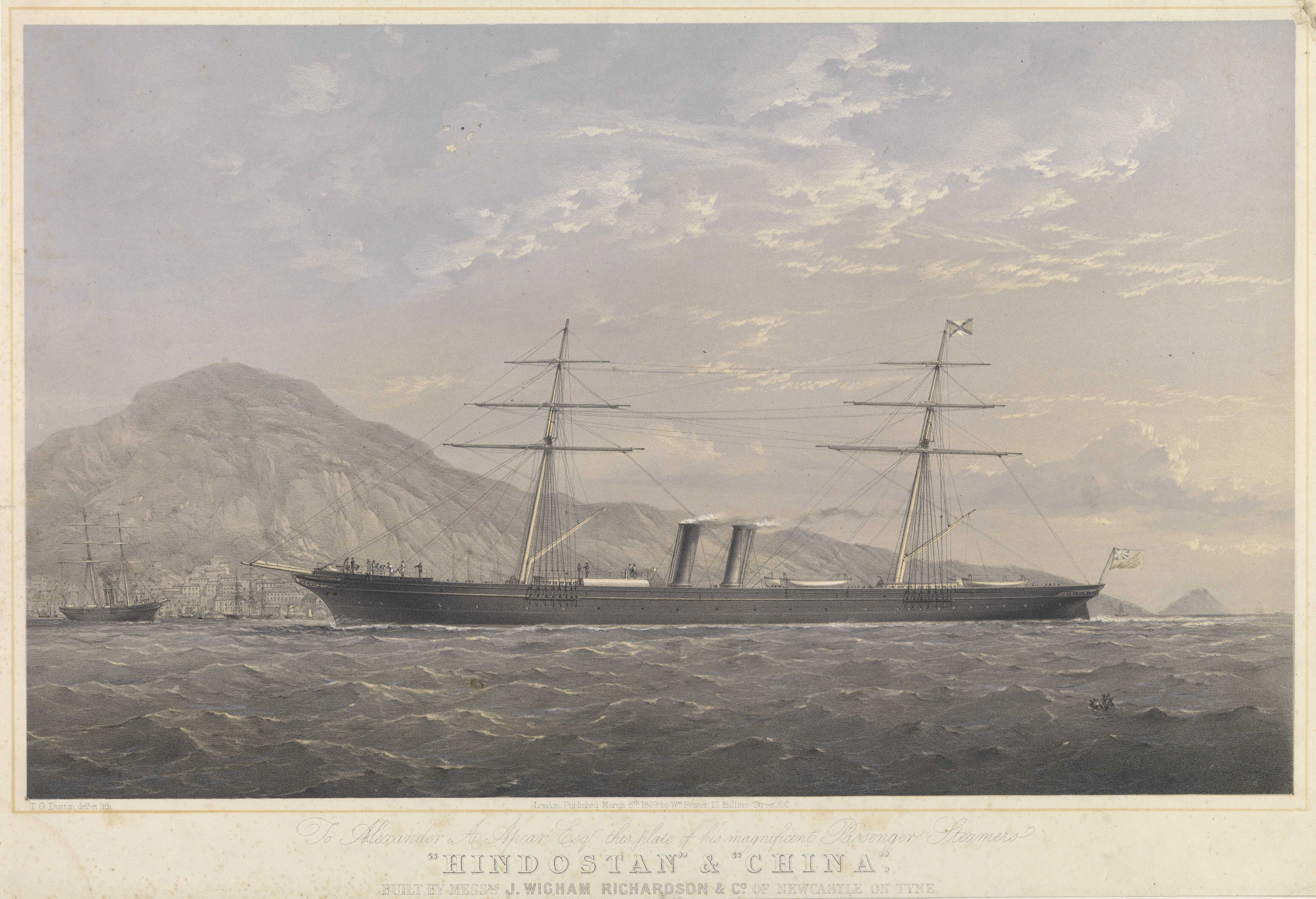
Passenger Steamers Hindostan and China, by Thomas Goldsworthy Dutton

The 1019-ton steam ship Catherine Apcar was built in 1865, and soon after the 1476-ton Hindustan and 1471-ton China were added. The Japan was commissioned in 1872. In 1873 the 2153-ton Arratoon Apcar was built. In 1891 the Apcar Line acquired the new 3,250-ton steam ship Lightning. Cabin passengers were accommodated in the poop. The ship carried Indian and Chinese laborers to Singapore and Penang as deck passengers. In July 1893 the Japan was retired, replaced by the 2,715-ton Catherine Apcar.

The Hyson passenger/cargo liner, built in Belfast and launched in 1895, was purchased by the Apcars and renamed Arratoon Apcar in 1899. She was taken over by the British-India Steam Navigation Company in 1912 when they purchased the Apcar Line, retaining her name. Eventually she was demolished in 1932. The 4,563-ton Gregory Apcar joined the fleet in 1902, and the new Japan in 1906. Until well into the 20th century the ships had to be prepared for attack by Chinese pirates, and were armed and sandbagged for defense.

== Sources ==
- "Arratoon Apcar (1896)" (PDF). P&O Heritage. November 2008. Archived from the original (PDF) on 2013-11-05.
- "Arratoon Apcar". National Park Service, U.S. Department of the Interior.
- Blake, George (1956). B.I. Centenary - 1856 : 1956).
- Blumi, Isa (2013-09-12). Ottoman Refugees, 1878-1939: Migration in a Post-Imperial World. A&C Black. ISBN 978-1-4725-1538-4.
- Campo, Joseph Norbert Frans Marie à (2002). Engines of Empire: Steamshipping and State Formation in Colonial Indonesia. Uitgeverij Verloren. ISBN 978-90-6550-738-9.
- Chakrabarti, Prabhas Kumar (1989-01-01). Coal Industry in West Bengal. Northern Book Centre. ISBN 978-81-85119-61-8.
- "Diana A. Apcar (1869-1937): The First Armenian Woman Diplomat". Armenian Cultural Foundation. Archived from the original on 2013-11-01.
- Faure, David (1997-09-01). Society: A Documentary History of Hong Kong. Hong Kong University Press. ISBN 978-962-209-393-5.
- Geological Survey (1865). Memoirs of the Geological Survey of India. Governor-General of India.
- Hamashita, Takeshi (2013-05-13). China, East Asia and the Global Economy: Regional and Historical Perspectives. Taylor & Francis. ISBN 978-1-134-04028-5.
- Harcourt, Freda (2006-09-05). Flagships of Imperialism: The P & O Company and the Politics of Empire from Its Origins to 1867. Manchester University Press. ISBN 978-1-84779-145-0.
- Kling, Blair B. (1976). Partner in Empire: Dwarkanath Tagore and the Age of Enterprise in Eastern India. University of California Press. p. 129. ISBN 978-0-520-02927-9.
- "Late Sir A. A. Apcar". The Straits Times: 9. 30 April 1913.
- Massey, Montague (1918). Recollections of Calcutta for over half a century. NuVision Publications, LLC. ISBN 978-1-61536-102-1.
- Munro, J. Forbes (2003). Maritime Enterprise and Empire: Sir William Mackinnon and His Business Network, 1823-93. Boydell Press. ISBN 978-0-85115-935-5.
- "Obituary Sir A.A. Apcar". The Times. 1913.
- Seth, Mesrovb Jacob (1937). Armenians in India, from the Earliest Times to the Present Day: A Work of Original Research. Asian Educational Services. ISBN 978-81-206-0812-2.
- Seth, Mesrovb J. (2004-01-01). History of the Armenians in India. Gorgias Press LLC. ISBN 978-1-59333-049-1.
- "The Arratoon Apcar", The Weekly Reporter, Wildy & Sons, 1890
- Wright, Nadia (2 July 2002). "Some notes on the Apcar Line".
- Zwillenberg, H.J. (1981). "Clare, Chapman James (1853–1940)". Australian Dictionary of Biography. Vol. 8. MUP.
