= Archibald Birkmyre =

Scottish businessman (1875-1935)

Sir Archibald Birkmyre Bt CBE
- Born: 28 June 1875; Springbank House, Kilmacolm, Renfrewshire, Scotland
- Died: 24 June 1935 (aged 59)
- Occupations: Jute manufacturer and merchant, public servant

Sir Archibald Birkmyre, 1st Baronet, CBE (28 June 1875 – 24 June 1935) was a Scottish jute manufacturer and merchant in India.

Birkmyre was born at Springbank House, in Kilmacolm, Renfrewshire, the son of manufacturer Henry Birkmyre and his wife, Margaret (née Sommerville). He became senior partner of the family firm, Birkmyre Brothers, in Calcutta and also served on the Viceroy of India's Legislative Council and the Bengal Legislative Council. He was vice-president of the Bengal Chamber of Commerce and Industry.

In 1915, Birkmyre constructed a four-storey building on Middleton Row in Calcutta as a tribute to his friend, Dr Anderson Graham. In support of the children of Kalimpong, Graham used this building to house graduating students of St Andrew's Colonial Homes so they could attend university in Calcutta.

Birkmyre was knighted in 1917, appointed Commander of the Order of the British Empire (CBE) in 1918, and created a baronet in the 1921 New Year Honours.

== Footnotes ==
Baronetage of the United Kingdom
| New creation | Baronet (of Dalmunzie); 1921–1935 | Succeeded by Henry Birkmyre |
