= Abgar (name) =

- Pronunciation: Classical Syriac: [ʔaw.ɡar.], Assyrian Neo-Aramaic: [ʔoːd͡ʒar]
- Gender: Masculine

Origin
- Origin: Classical Syriac: ܐܒܓܪ (Abgar)

Abgar (Syriac: ܐܲܒ݂ܓܲܪ) is a masculine given name of Classical Syriac origin. The name is derived from the term abgara (Classical Syriac: ܐܒܓܪܐ, romanized: ʾaḇgārā, lit. 'lame') and is typically used as a given name (such as in Assyrian Neo-Aramaic). The name may also be used as a surname.

== Given name ==
=== Kings of Osroene ===
- Abgar II (ruled 68–53 BC)
- Abgar V (ruled 4 BC–40 AD)
- Abgar VI (ruled 71–91 AD)
- Abgar VII (ruled 109–116 AD)
- Abgar VIII (ruled 167–177 AD)
- Abgar IX (ruled 177–212 AD)

=== Others ===
- Abgar Ali Akbar Armani (died after 1708), Armenian merchant in the Safavid Empire who converted from Christianity to Islam
- Apcar Baltazar (1880–1909), also spelled Abgar, Romanian painter and art critic
- Abgar Barsom (born 1977), Swedish former footballer

== Surname ==
- Clara Abkar (1916–1996), sometimes spelled Klara Abgar, Iranian-born Armenian miniaturist painter and gilder
- Diana Abgar (1859–1937), Armenian writer and diplomat
- Kajetan Abgarowicz (1856–1909), also known as Kajetan Abgar-Soltan and Soltan Abgar, Polish-Armenian journalist and short-story writer
- Virginia Apgar (1909–1974), sometimes spelled Virgina Abgar, American physician and medical researcher

== See also ==
- Apgar, a surname
- Abgarid dynasty
