= Birkmyre baronets =

Baronetcy in the Baronetage of the United Kingdom

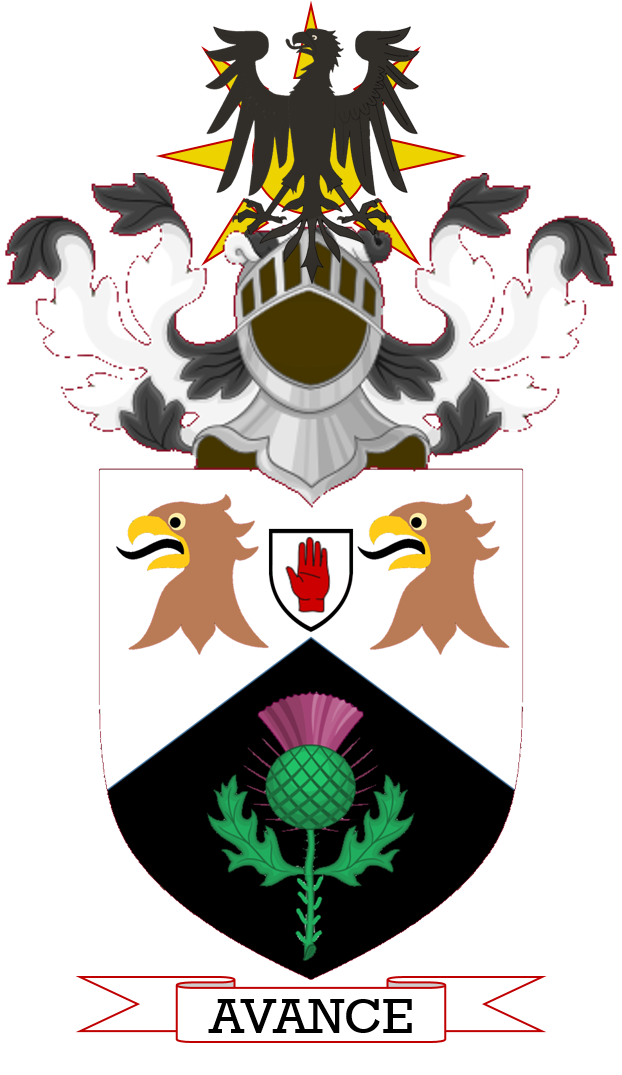
Achievement of arms

The Birkmyre Baronetcy, of Dalmunzie in the County of Perth, is a title in the Baronetage of the United Kingdom. It was created on 29 January 1921 for Sir Archibald Birkmyre. He was a senior partner in the firm of Birkmyre Brothers, jute spinners, of Calcutta, and a member of the Viceroy of India's Legislative Council. As of 2007 the title is held by his great-grandson, the fourth Baronet, who succeeded his father in 2001.

== Birkmyre baronets, of Dalmunzie (1921) ==
- Sir Archibald Birkmyre, 1st Baronet (1875–1935)
- Sir Henry Birkmyre, 2nd Baronet (1898–1992)
- Sir Archibald Birkmyre, 3rd Baronet (1923–2001)
- Sir James Birkmyre, 4th Baronet (born 1956)

The heir apparent is the present holder's son Alexander Birkmyre (born 1991).

Coat of arms of Birkmyre baronets

Crest
In front of a rising sun Proper an eagle displayed Sable.
Escutcheon
Per chevron Argent and Sable, in chief two eagles heads erased and in base a thistle leaved and slipped all Proper.
Motto
Avance
