= Apgar =

Apgar is a surname. Notable people with the surname include:

- Charles E. Apgar (1865–1950), American amateur radio operator
- Brittany Apgar, (born 2003), American baseball player
- James K. Apgar (1862–1940), American politician
- Jean Apgar (born 1936), American biochemist
- Kristina Apgar (born 1985), American television actress
- Mahlon Apgar IV (1941–2023), American expert on housing, infrastructure, and real estate
- Virginia Apgar (1909–1974), American physician, developer of the Apgar score
- William C. Apgar, American economist

== See also ==
- Apgar score, a method to quickly and summarily assess the health of newborn children immediately after childbirth developed by Virginia Apgar
- Abgar V (c. 1st century BC – c. AD 50), was an Arab King of Osroene with his capital at Edessa and said to be one of the first Christian kings, having been converted to the faith by Thaddeus of Edessa, one of the seventy disciples.
- Apgar Village, one of the main villages in Glacier National Park.
- Apcar (name), a transliteration of the underlying shared Armenian surname and given name Աբգար.
