= Diana Abgar =

Armenian writer, humanitarian and diplomat

Diana Apcar
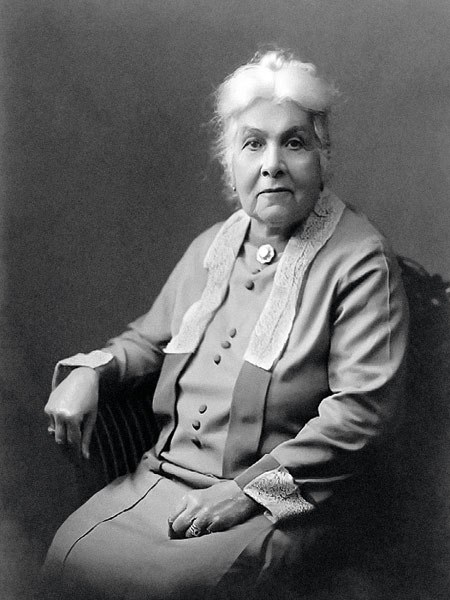

Armenia Honorary consul to Japan
- In office 1920–1920
- Preceded by: position established
- Succeeded by: position abolished

Personal details
- Born: 17 October 1859 Rangoon, British Burma
- Died: 8 July 1937 (aged 77) Yokohama, Japan
- Occupation: Writer, merchant and humanitarian

Diana Abcar (or Apgar; Armenian: Դիանա Աբգար, 17 October 1859 – 8 July 1937) was a diaspora Armenian writer and humanitarian, who was appointed Honorary Consul to Japan of the short-lived First Republic of Armenia (1918-1920). She was the first female Armenian diplomat and one of the first women to have ever been appointed in any diplomatic post in the twentieth century.

== Life ==
Diana Agabeg (Agabegian), whose baptismal name was Gayane, was born in Rangoon, British Burma (today Yangon, Myanmar) on 17 October 1859. Her father was an Armenian from New Julfa, Iran who migrated to South East Asia. Diana Apcar's mother Avet was from the Tateos Avetum family from Shiraz, a city in south-central Iran. Diana was the youngest of seven children in the family. Apcar was raised in Calcutta and received her education in a local convent school. Diana Apcar became fluent in English, Armenian, and Hindustani.

Apcar married Michael Apcar, a descendant of the house of Apcar of New Julfa, the same area where Apcar's maternal family, the Aghabegians, originated from as well. The Apcar family became successful tradesmen and merchants all around South-East Asia. They became especially successful in the import-export business of shellac lacquer pearls. In 1891, Diana and her husband moved to Japan to found and expand the family business. They eventually had 5 children, of which only 3 survived. At the age of sixty-seven, Apcar was experiencing numerous physical problems, such as failing eyesight, hearing loss, and arthritis. These health issues led to her death on the morning of 8 July 1937 in Yokohama. She was buried in cemetery for foreigners beside her husband and is currently being taken care of by the Society of Armenian-Japanese Friendship which is based in Tokyo.

== Diplomatic career ==
When the Republic of Armenia gained independence on 28 May 1918, Armenia was not recognized by any international state. Yet in 1920, through Apcar's efforts, Japan became the first nation to recognize the new republic's independence. Out of respect to her efforts, Hamo Ohanjanyan, who was then the Foreign Minister of the Republic, appointed Diana Apcar Honorary Consul to Japan. This made her the first Armenian woman diplomat and one of the first women appointed in any diplomatic post in the twentieth century. However, after the fall of the First Republic of Armenia in the same year 1920, her post was abruptly terminated.

== Works ==
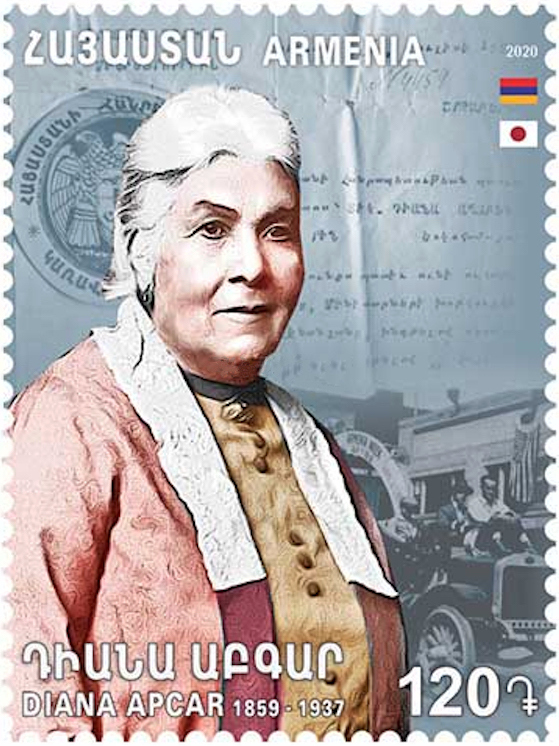
Abgar on a 2020 stamp of Armenia

After her son took over the family business in Japan, Apcar had more time to concentrate on her humanitarian, literary, and diplomatic career. She started working with numerous journals and newspapers such as The Japan Advertiser, The Far East, The Japan gazette, and Armenia (later to be known as New Armenia). She focused much of her literature on the oppressed and their circumstances. She wrote about the Armenian plight in the Ottoman Empire in order to raise global awareness. By 1920 she had already written over nine books in dedication to the Armenian Genocide. She also wrote many articles on international relations and the impact of imperialism on world affairs and global peace. These works include:

- The Great Evil. Yokohama, Japan: “Japan Gazette” Press, 1914, 114 pp.
- Peace and No Peace. Yokohama, Japan: “Japan Gazette” Press, 1912, 101 pp.
- The Peace Problem. Yokohama, Japan: “Japan Gazette” Press, 1912, 131 pp.
- On the Cross of Europe’s Imperialism: Armenia Crucified. Yokohama, Japan: 1918, 116 pp.
- In His Name ... Yokohama, Japan: “Japan Gazette,” 1911. 52 pp.
- Betrayed Armenia. Yokohama, Japan: “Japan Gazette” Press, 1910, 77 pp.
- The Truth about the Armenian Massacres. Yokohama, Japan: “Japan Gazette,” 1910, 26 pp.
- Home Stories of the War. Kobe, Japan: The Kaneko Printing Works, 1905, 47 pp.
- Susan. Yokohama, Japan: Kelly and Walsh, Limited, 1892, 109 pp.

== The Stateless Diplomat ==
A great-granddaughter of Diana Apcar, Mimi Malayan, found a box of her writings in 2004 and began researching her life. In 2018 she completed a documentary film The Stateless Diplomat, drawing on previously unpublished writings. She also established a website making available many of Apcar's publications.
