= Bengal Chamber of Commerce and Industry =

- Formation: 1853; 173 years ago
- Type: Non-governmental trade association
- Legal status: Foundation
- Purpose: Policy advocacy
- Headquarters: Kolkata, India
- Region served: South Asia
- Official language: English
- Key People: Mr. Abraham Stephanos, President; Mr. Subhodip Ghosh, Director General
- Website: www.bengalchamber.com
- Formerly called: Calcutta Chamber of Commerce

The Bengal Chamber of Commerce and Industry is a non-governmental trade association and advocacy group based in West Bengal, India. It is the oldest chamber of commerce in India, and one of the oldest in Asia.

Established in 1853, finding its origin in 1833–34, it is the only such institution in India.

The organization has its headquarters at the former Royal Exchange in B. B. D. Bagh, Kolkata, which was once the residence of Lord William Bentinck, the first Governor-General of India.

== Membership ==
The members include corporations and industries of all sizes, professionals, divisions of large multinational corporations and service industry organizations. The corporate members are drawn largely from the sectors of agriculture, engineering, textiles, leather, fast-moving consumer goods and customer services, and are not confined to West Bengal and the Eastern Region, but are from all over India.

== History ==
The Bengal Chamber of Commerce was founded in 1853, replacing the former Calcutta Chamber of Commerce, which was merged into the new organization. At the outset, it had eighty-six members in Calcutta and eighteen others. Its objects included –

- To establish just and equitable principles in trade;
- To form a code or codes of practice to facilitate transaction of business;
- To maintain uniformity in rules, regulations and usages of trade;
- To communicate with Chambers of Commerce and other mercantile and public bodies throughout the world, and concert and promote measures for the protection of trade and traders.

On 30 November 1857, as a result of the Indian Mutiny, the Chamber appealed to the Government of India to send "a force of Europeans, either sailors or soldiers" to defend Akyab, as it considered the Arracan Battalion not to give enough protection. It was concerned about "the safety of the inhabitants and the security of the public treasury". The Secretary to the Government replied on 2 December, regretting that "there is no European force available at present."

In 1876, at a time when silver was falling in value, chiefly due to the opening of new mines in the United States, the Bengal Chamber of Commerce was so concerned that it proposed that the Government of India should suspend the coining of silver. The Economist of 5 August 1876 reported that

The Chamber of Commerce of Bengal have resolved "that it is expedient for the government to suspend clause 19 of Act 23 of 1870, which makes it obligatory on the Indian Mint to receive all silver tendered for coinage... and that during such suspension it be unlawful to import coined rupees.

The Chamber and its business were greatly disrupted by the partition of India and the partition of Bengal in 1947, with West Bengal becoming part of the new Dominion of India and East Bengal going to the Dominion of Pakistan. Despite this, changes in the Chamber were later described as "slow and incremental". New businesses joined the Chamber, and its first Indian President of the new era was elected in 1958. It developed from a gentlemen's club of able merchants whose chief concern was with trade into a modern organization with as much concern for industry as for trade. Whereas the officers and committee members had previously been the owners of capital, they were now more likely to be professional senior managers.

== Notable people ==
James Lyle Mackay, later first Earl of Inchcape, was elected president of the Chamber in 1890, and Ernest Cable in 1903, followed by Sir Apcar Alexander Apcar KCSI from 1904 to 1907. Archibald Birkmyre (1875–1935) was vice-president, and John Jardine Paterson was President in 1966.

In 2004, O. P. Jindal (1930–2005) was awarded the Chamber's Lifetime Achievement Award for his outstanding contribution to the Indian Steel Industry.

== List of presidents ==
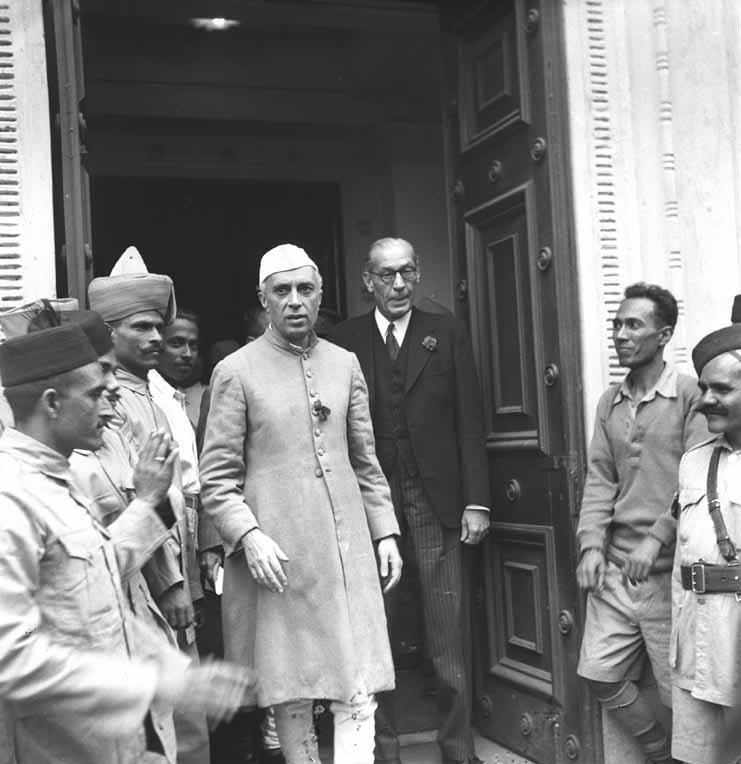
Prime Minister Jawaharlal Nehru with then President of the chamber H.D. Cumberbatch in January 1948.

- John N. Bullen: 1865
- George Yule: 1878–1879
- Sir Alexander Wilson: 1885
- Henry Blois Hawkins Turner: 1886–1887
- James Lyle Mackay, later first Earl of Inchcape: 1890
- Sir Allan Arthur: 1894–95, 1896–97, part of 1898, 1899–1900
- Sir Montagu Cornish Turner: 1898, 1901, 1902
- Sir George Henry Sutherland: 1900–1901
- Ernest Cable: 1903
- Sir Apcar Alexander Apcar KCSI: 1904–1907
- Sir Ruthven Grey Monteath: 1914
- Sir Francis Hugh Stewart: 1915
- Sir Edward Hugh Bray: 1917
- Sir Walter Erskine Crum: 1919–20
- Sir Alexander Robertson Murray: 1920
- Sir Campbell Rhodes: 1922
- Sir Willoughby Langer Carey: 1923
- Sir William Crawford Currie: 1924–1925
- Sir John William Anderson Bell: 1926–1927
- Sir Basil Eden Garth Eddis: 1927–1928
- Sir Edward Charles Benthall: 1932, 1936
- Sir George Riddoch Campbell: 1935–1936, 1938–1939
- Sir (John) Henry Richardson: 1940
- Sir (Robert) Renwick Haddow: 1942–43, 1945–46
- Sir John Henry Burder: 1943–1944
- Sir Kenneth William Mealing: 1944–1945
- Sir Harry Townend: 1946–1947
- Sir Hugh Douglas Cumberbatch: 1947–1948
- Sir Arthur Paul Benthall: 1948, 1950
- Sir Anthony Joseph Elkins: 1949
- Sir Albert Ridgeby Eliott Lockhart: 1951
- Sir Charles Alexander Innes: 1952–1953
- Ernest John Pakes (1899–1988): 1953–1954
- Sir George Mason MacKinlay: 1954–1955
- Sir (George) Alexander Sim: 1955–1956
- Sir Owain Trevor Jenkins: 1956–1957
- Sir Walter Harold Strachan Michelmore: 1957
- Sir John Douglas Keith Brown: 1958–1960
- Sir Henry Morton Leech Williams: 1960
- Sir Nicol Stenhouse: 1961–1962
- Sir Hugh MacKay-Tallack: 1962–1963
- Sir Alec Drummond Ogilvie: 1964–1965
- Sir James Harvey Kincaid Stewart Lindsay: 1965
- Sir John Jardine Paterson: 1966-1967
- Sir Cyril Alfred Pitts: 1967–1968
- Sir (John) Michael Parsons: 1968–1970
- Mr. A. K. Sen: 1970-1971
- Mr. Bhaskar Mitter: 1971-1972
- Mr. A. N. Haksar: 1972-1973
- Mr. A.W.B. Hayward: 1973-1974
- Mr.D.P. Goenka: 1974-1975
- Mr. A. L Mudaliar: 1975-1976
- Mr. J. Sengupta: 1976-1978
- Mr.P.Z. Baldik: 1978-1979
- Mr. S. K. Mehera: 1979-1980
- Mr.H.D. Wahi: 1980-1981
- Mr. R. S. Mamak: 1981-1982
- Mr. S. P. Acharya: 1982-1983
- Mr.T.D. Sinha: 1983-1984
- Mr. A. Mazumdar: 1984-1985
- Mr. S. D. Singh: 1985-1986
- Mr. R. S. Sikand: 1986-1987
- Mr. P. K. Gupta: 1987-1988
- Mr. Samir Ghosh: 1988-1989
- Mr. K. S. B. Sanyal: 1989-1990
- Dr. Abhijit Sen: 1990-1991
- Mr. Mumtaz Ahmad: 1991-1992
- Mr. Biji K. Kurien: 1992-1993
- Mr. K. C. Mehra: 1993-1994
- Mr. P. B. Ghosh: 1994-1995
- Mr. P. K. Dutt: 1995-1996
- Mr. H. P. Barooah: 1996-1997
- Mr. S. S. Prasad: 1997-1998
- Dr. Bhaskar Banerjee: 1998-1999
- Mr. B. D. Bose: 1999-2000
- Mr. S. B. Ganguly: 2000-2001
- Mr.S.K. Dhall: 2001-2002
- Mr. Sumit Mazumder: 2002-2003
- Mr. Biswadip Gupta: 2003-2004
- Mr. A. Lahiri: 2004-2005
- Mr. Aloke Mookherjea: 2005-2006
- Mr. S. Radhakrishnan: 2006-2008
- Mr. Anup Singh: 2008-2009
- Mr. Sandipan Chakravortty: 2009-2011
- Mr. Harsh K Jha: 2011-2012
- Mr. Kallol Datta: 2012-2014
- Dr. Alok Roy: 2014-2015
- Mr. Ambarish Dasgupta: 2015-2016
- Mr. Sutanu Ghosh: 2016-2017
- Mr. Chandra Shekhar Ghosh: 2017-2018
- Mr. Indrajit Sen: 2018-2019
- Mr. B B Chatterjee: 2019-2020
- Mr. Deb A Mukherjee: 2020-2021
- Mr. Abraham Stephanos: 2021–Present
