= Apcar family =

Prominent Armenian family

- Current region: Bengal, British India
- Origin: New Julfa, Safavid Iran
- Founded: 18th century
- Founder: Apcar (Arathoon) family ancestors from New Julfa
- Members: Arathoon Stephen; Catchick Paul Chater
- Connected families: Other Armenian merchant families of India and Hong Kong
- Traditions: Armenian mercantile and trading family
- Estates: Calcutta (Kolkata), Bengal

The Apcar family is an Armenian family originally from New Julfa in Isfahan, Persia. After moving to India they became prominent in commerce and industry. Later members were involved in the practice of law and the legislature.

== Senior branch ==
Aratoon Apcar was born in 1779 at New Julfa in Isfahan, Persia. He was the second son of Apcar, the ancestor of the family. He came to Bombay when he was sixteen and found employment with an Armenian merchant there, trading with China and Manila. After his patron died, he continued in this trade in his own right. He founded Apcar & Co in 1809 and was Senior Member of this firm until his death in 1863. In 1830 he moved to Calcutta. He gave generous endowments to the Armenian Apostolic Church of St Mary at New Julfa, and in 1843 established the Armenian Patriotic School there. Aratoon Apcar died at Calcutta on 16 May 1863 at the age of 85.

Aratoon Apcar married Catherine Thomas (1800–1849) in 1813. They had four sons and one daughter name Sandookth who died aged 8 months (1814–1815), Apcar (1816–1862), Seth (1819-188?), Thomas (1821–1875) and Alexander (1824–1895). Seth Apcar (born Mumbai 12 May 1819 died London March 1885) was the first Armenian Sheriff of Kolkata. He was awarded the Order of the Lion and the Sun by the Shah of Iran, which was presented to him by the Governor-General of India. As a London resident in the 1870s, he was Honorary President of an Armenian committee set up to increase British awareness of the plight of Armenians during the decline of the Ottoman Empire. Alexander Apcar (born Mumbai 4 November 1824 died Kolkata 12 November 1895) was the Consul for Siam (Thailand) in Kolkata until his death. Alexander's son was Apcar Alexander Apcar (see below).

== Junior branch ==
Arratoon Apcar's younger brother Gregory Apcar (born New Julfa 1795 died Mumbai 23 June 1847) came to India in 1808. He was noted for his charitable work, particularly to the Armenian Apostolic Church and Armenian College. On 6 January 1827 he married Catchkathoon Sarkies in Mumbai. Their son Aratoon Gregory Apcar was born 4 November 1827 and died on 1 February 1916. His son, John Gregory Apcar (born 1849 died London, 28 October 1923), known as "Father John", was elected a member of the Bengal Legislative Council at the 1912–13 Bengal general election as one of two representatives for the Calcutta Corporation. He was also Clerk of the Crown and a municipal commissioner. He was admitted to the Inner Temple in 1871. He was educated at Harrow School, as was another son Gregory Apcar (born London 1848? died London, 17 May 1935). Both were benefactors of that school. Described in 1936 by Harrow's Governors as "an endowment which has never been equaled in the School's history" and "a shining example of love and care for Harrow", Gregory Apcar left the School an estate valued at around £320,000, which increased the value of the School's property and Trusts by almost two-thirds.

== Apcar & Co and the Apcar Line ==
Apcar & Co acted as general business agents and insurance brokers and controlled the Apcar Line. The Apcar Line ran a fleet of vessels from Kolkata carrying Chinese coolies and cargo, largely to and from Singapore, Hong Kong and Amoy (Xiamen), with connections to Japan. Pirates were active, and well into the twentieth century, the ships had to be armed and sandbagged against attacks.

Apcar & Co also entered the coal business. In 1862 coal seams were discovered near Raniganj and Asansol. Apcar & Co purchased an extensive stretch of land and started a mine at Lachipur (6.4 km from Asansol). They also opened coal mines at Charanpur, Faridpur and Borachuck. A large number of Armenians either owned collieries or worked in various capacities in the coalfields. Seeing the rapid development of the coalfields, European firms purchased large areas from Apcar & Co on a royalty basis and started to mine the coal. As a result, Asansol became a large and developed mining district.

On 27 February 1912 Apcar & Co, ships, workshops and mines, were sold to the British India Steam Navigation Company for Rs 800,000 and absorbed by BISN. Sailings from Kolkata to Japan were still advertised as being conducted by the Apcar Line into the 1950s. The coal mines were managed by Mackinnon, Mackenzie & Co until 1951.

== Apcar Alexander Apcar ==
Apcar Alexander Apcar was the second son of Apcar Arathoon Apcar. He was born in Kolkata on 3 October 1850. After going to Harrow School, he returned to Calcutta in the early 1870s, never again visiting Europe. He was a keen cricketer, and rackets player. He was president of the Calcutta Turf Club. He kept a fine stud, recruited from a breeding farm he owned in Australia. His stud was "summered" at Bangalore, where he spent a good part of the hot weather season.

Sir Alexander took a prominent part in the work of the Bengal Chamber of Commerce, of which he was vice-president in 1903 and president from 1904 to 1907. He represented the Chamber on the Bengal Legislative Council, and on the Supreme Legislature from 1900 to 1909, and for many years he was one of its representatives on the Kolkata Port Trust. Sir Alexander was the Consul for Siam in Calcutta for many years. He became head of Apcar & Co. He was created a CSI in 1903, and was advanced to knighthood of the Order on the occasion of the Coronation Durbar at Delhi later that year. Sir Apcar Alexander Apcar, KCSI died at Bangalore on 17 April 1913. He was unmarried. The Times Obituary stated that the death of Sir Alexander, "removes one of the best known and most popular of the merchant princes of Calcutta."

== Sources ==
- "Arratoon Apcar (1896)" (PDF). P&O Heritage. November 2008. Archived from the original (PDF) on 2013-11-05.
- "Arratoon Apcar". National Park Service, U.S. Department of the Interior.
- Emin, Emin Joseph; Apcar, Amy (1918). Life and Adventures of Emin Joseph Emin, 1726–1809. Baptist Mission Press.
- "Late Sir A. A. Apcar". The Straits Times: 9. 30 April 1913.
- "Obituary Sir A.A. Apcar". The Times. 1913.
- Seth, Mesrovb J. (1937). History of the Armenians in India. Gorgias Press LLC. ISBN 978-1-59333-049-1.
- "The Arratoon Apcar". The Weekly Reporter. Wildy & Sons. 1890. p. 482.
