= Canton of Dijon =

Canton of Dijon may refer to:

- Canton of Dijon-1, Arrondissement of Dijon, Côte-d'Or, France
- Canton of Dijon-2, Arrondissement of Dijon, Côte-d'Or, France
- Canton of Dijon-3, Arrondissement of Dijon, Côte-d'Or, France
- Canton of Dijon-4, Arrondissement of Dijon, Côte-d'Or, France
- Canton of Dijon-5, Arrondissement of Dijon, Côte-d'Or, France
- Canton of Dijon-6, Arrondissement of Dijon, Côte-d'Or, France
- Canton of Dijon-7, Arrondissement of Dijon, Côte-d'Or, France
- Canton of Dijon-8, Arrondissement of Dijon, Côte-d'Or, France

== See also ==
- Dijon (disambiguation)
