= Cantons of the Côte-d'Or department =

List of cantons of Côte-d'Or, France

The following is a list of the 23 cantons of the Côte-d'Or department, in France, following the French canton reorganisation which came into effect in March 2015:

- Arnay-le-Duc
- Auxonne
- Beaune
- Brazey-en-Plaine
- Châtillon-sur-Seine
- Chenôve
- Chevigny-Saint-Sauveur
- Dijon-1
- Dijon-2
- Dijon-3
- Dijon-4
- Dijon-5
- Dijon-6
- Fontaine-lès-Dijon
- Genlis
- Is-sur-Tille
- Ladoix-Serrigny
- Longvic
- Montbard
- Nuits-Saint-Georges
- Saint-Apollinaire
- Semur-en-Auxois
- Talant
