= Dijon (disambiguation) =

Dijon is a city in eastern France.

Dijon may also refer to:

== People ==
- Dijon Carruthers, former drummer for Megadeth
- Dijon Duenas (born 1992), American musician who performs as Dijon
- Dijon Kizzee (died 2020), cyclist who died in an incident with police
- Dijon Lee (born 2006), American football player
- Dijon McFarlane or Mustard (born 1990), American record producer and DJ
- Dijon Prioleau (born 1992), American gospel singer
- Dijon Shariff (born 1991), American rapper
- Dijon Thompson (born 1983), American basketball player
- Lil Dijon, Australian hip-hop artist
- Rocky Dijon (1935–1993), Ghanaian musician

== Places ==
- Dijon Métropole. the Dijon metropolitan area
- Arrondissement of Dijon, arrondissement of France
  - Canton of Dijon-1, Côte-d'Or, France
  - Canton of Dijon-2, Côte-d'Or, France
  - Canton of Dijon-3, Côte-d'Or, France
  - Canton of Dijon-4, Côte-d'Or, France
  - Canton of Dijon-5, Côte-d'Or, France
  - Canton of Dijon-6, Côte-d'Or, France
  - Canton of Dijon-7, Côte-d'Or, France; see Arrondissement of Dijon
  - Canton of Dijon-8, Côte-d'Or, France; see Arrondissement of Dijon

== Facilities and structures ==
- Dijon Air Base (IATA airport code: DIJ, ICAO airport code: LFSD; a.k.a. Aéroport Dijon-Bourgogne), formerly joint military-civilian airfield now civilian, for the city of Dijon
- Dijon-Prenois (a.k.a. "Dijon"), a racetrack in Prenois near Dijon
- Dijon Cathedral, a Roman Catholic cathedral in the city of Dijon
- Dijon-Ville station (French: Dijon City), a rail station in the city of Dijon
- Dijon–Vallorbe railway, in France
- University of Dijon, in the city of Dijon
- Academy of Dijon

== Sports ==
- Dijon FCO, men's football club based in the city of Dijon
- Dijon FCO (women), women's soccer club based in the city of Dijon
- JDA Dijon Basket, basketball club based in the city of Dijon

== Other ==
- Battle of Dijon
  - Battle of Dijon (500), see 500s (decade)
  - Siege of Dijon (1513)
  - Battle of Dijon (1870), see Timeline of Dijon
- Parlement de Dijon, the defunct provincial parliament for the province of Burgundy
- Dijon (DuckTales), character from the DuckTales animated television series
- Dijon mustard, French mustard
- Dijon sauce

== See also ==
- Dijon-Porte-Neuve station (French: Dijon New Port), a rail station in the city of Dijon
- Church of Notre-Dame of Dijon, Dijon, France
- Dijonnaise
- Honey Dijon (disambiguation)
