= Avelanges =

- Commune
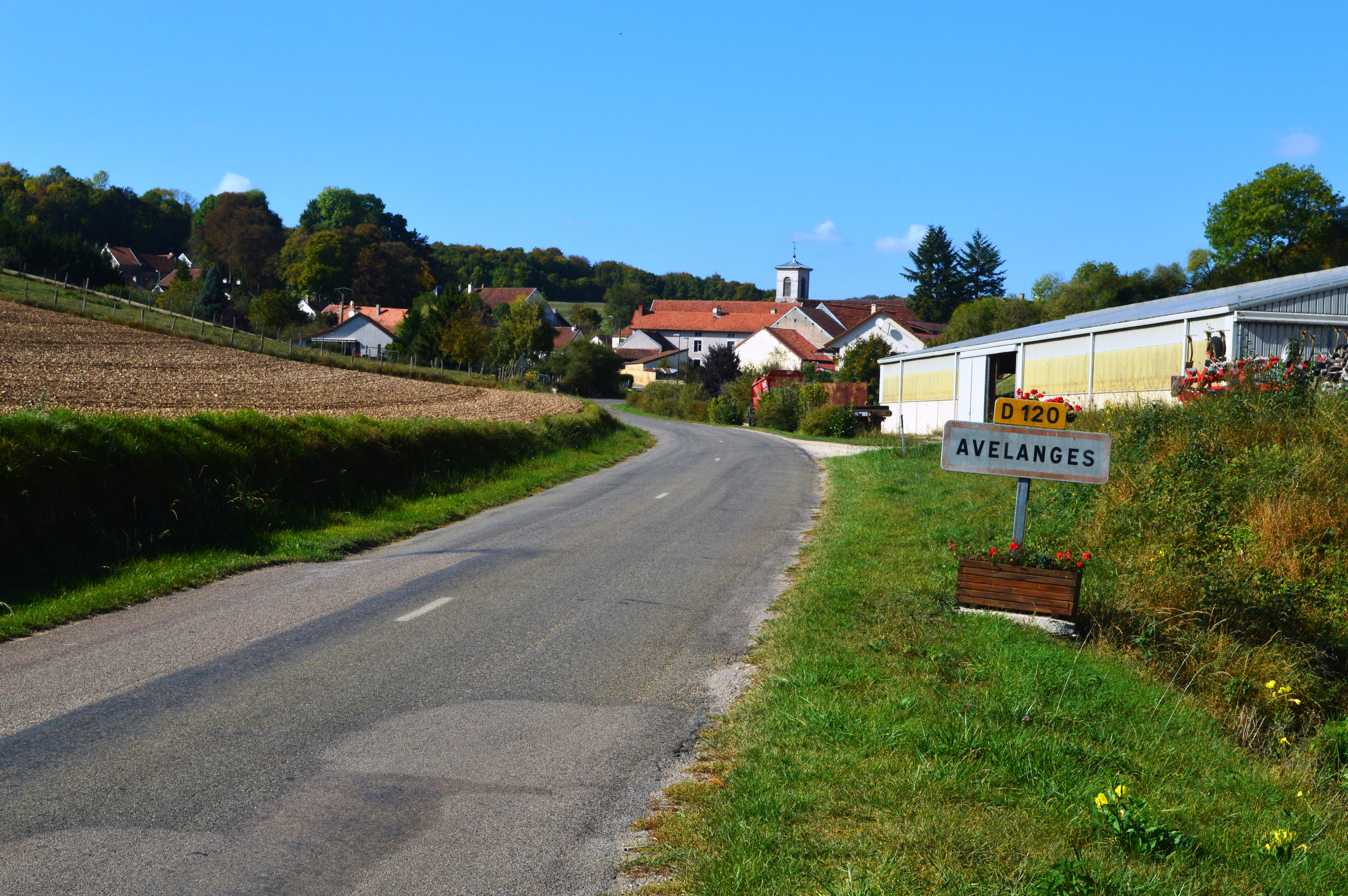
- The road into Avelanges

- Coat of arms
- Location of Avelanges
- Location within France Location within Bourgogne-Franche-Comté
- Coordinates: 47°35′11″N 5°01′34″E
- Country: France
- Region: Bourgogne-Franche-Comté
- Department: Côte-d'Or
- Arrondissement: Dijon
- Canton: Is-sur-Tille
- Intercommunality: CC Vallées Tille Ignon

Government
  - Mayor (2020–2026): Sylvain Rebérol
- Area^{1}: 6.08 km^{2} (2.35 sq mi)
- Elevation: 370 m (1,210 ft)
- Highest elevation: 467 m (1,532 ft)
- Lowest elevation: 348 m (1,142 ft)
- Population (2023): 33
  - Density: 5.4/km^{2} (14/sq mi)
- Time zone: UTC+01:00 (CET)
  - Summer (DST): UTC+02:00 (CEST)
- INSEE/Postal code: 21039 /21120
- ^{1} French Land Register data, which excludes lakes, ponds, glaciers > 1 km^{2} (0.386 sq mi or 247 acres) and river estuaries.

Avelanges (French pronunciation: [avlɑ̃ʒ]) is a commune in the Côte-d'Or department in the Bourgogne-Franche-Comté region of eastern France.

== Geography ==
Avelanges is located some 45 km north of Dijon and 35 km east by south-east of Aignay-le-Duc. Access to the commune is by the D120 road which branches from the D112 south of Avot in the north and passes through the commune and village before continuing south-west to Marey-sur-Tille. The commune has extensive forests mixed with smaller areas of farmland.

== Toponymy ==
The name was Arclenglis or Avelengiis in 1028, Avallangiae in 1244, and Avelanges in 1793.

== Administration ==
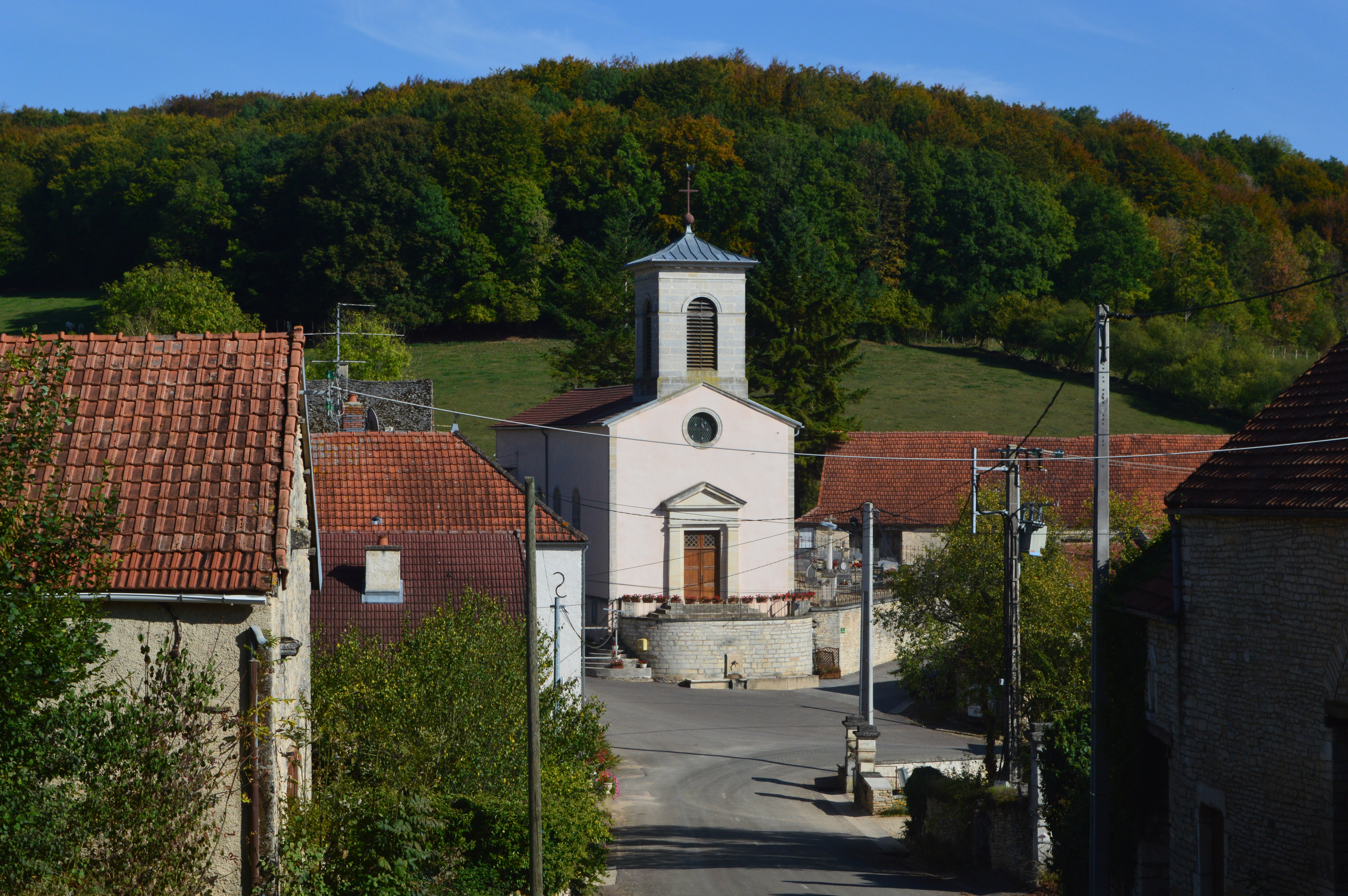
Avelanges Landscape

List of Successive Mayors

| From | To | Name |
|---|---|---|
| 2001 | 2020 | Jean Michel Moyemont |
| 2020 | 2026 | Sylvain Rebérol |

== Demography ==
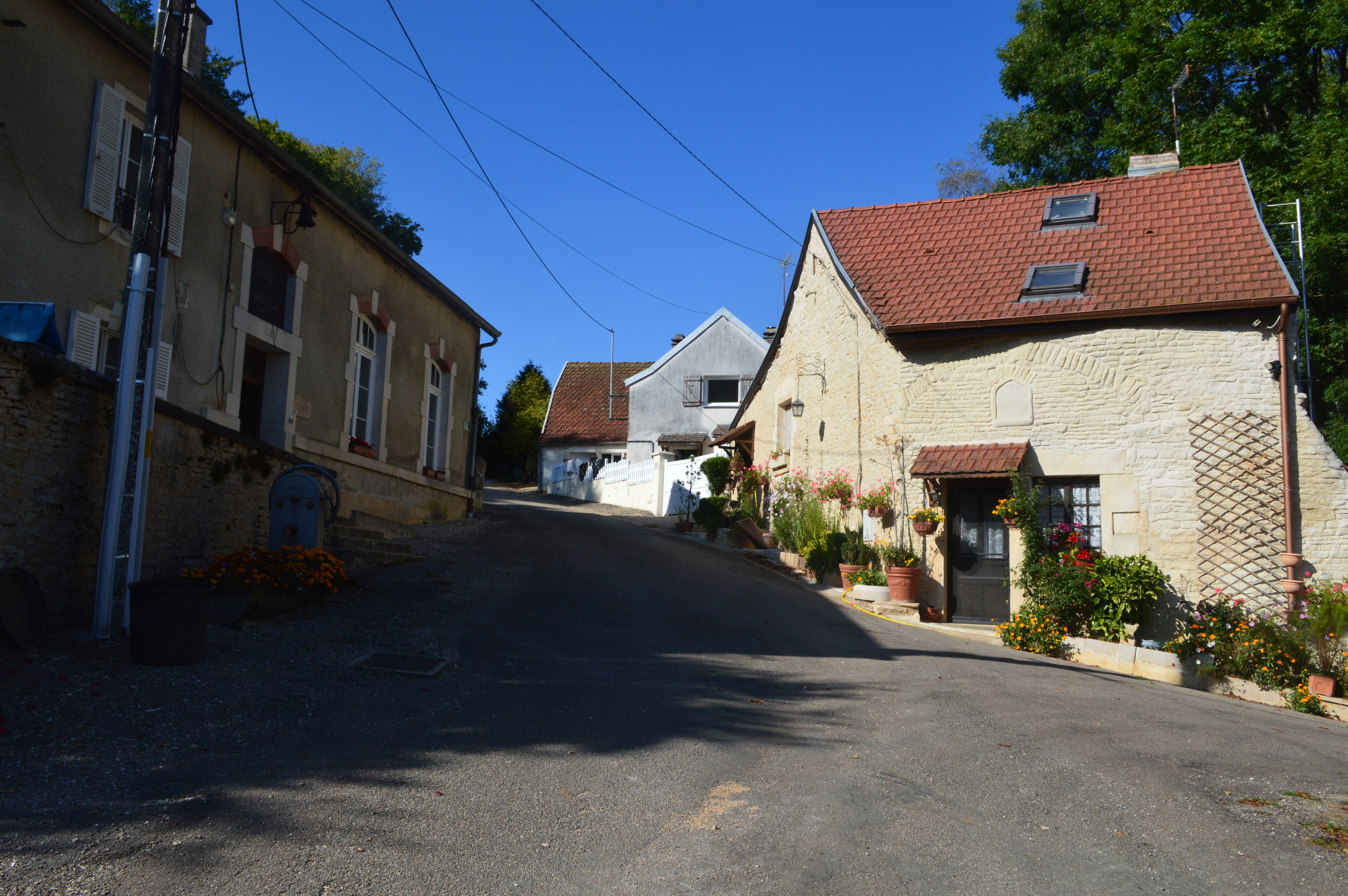
A street in Avelanges

The inhabitants of the commune are known as Avelangeais or Avelangeaises in French.

Historical population

| Year | Pop. | ±% p.a. |
|---|---|---|
| 1793 | 128 | — |
| 1821 | 121 | −0.20% |
| 1846 | 115 | −0.20% |
| 1872 | 82 | −1.29% |
| 1901 | 70 | −0.54% |
| 1926 | 43 | −1.93% |
| 1946 | 54 | +1.15% |
| 1962 | 47 | −0.86% |
| 1968 | 41 | −2.25% |

| Year | Pop. | ±% p.a. |
|---|---|---|
| 1975 | 43 | +0.68% |
| 1982 | 42 | −0.34% |
| 1990 | 41 | −0.30% |
| 1999 | 46 | +1.29% |
| 2007 | 44 | −0.55% |
| 2012 | 37 | −3.41% |
| 2017 | 35 | −1.11% |
| 2023 | 33 | −0.98% |

Source: EHESS and INSEE

== Avelanges Picture Gallery ==
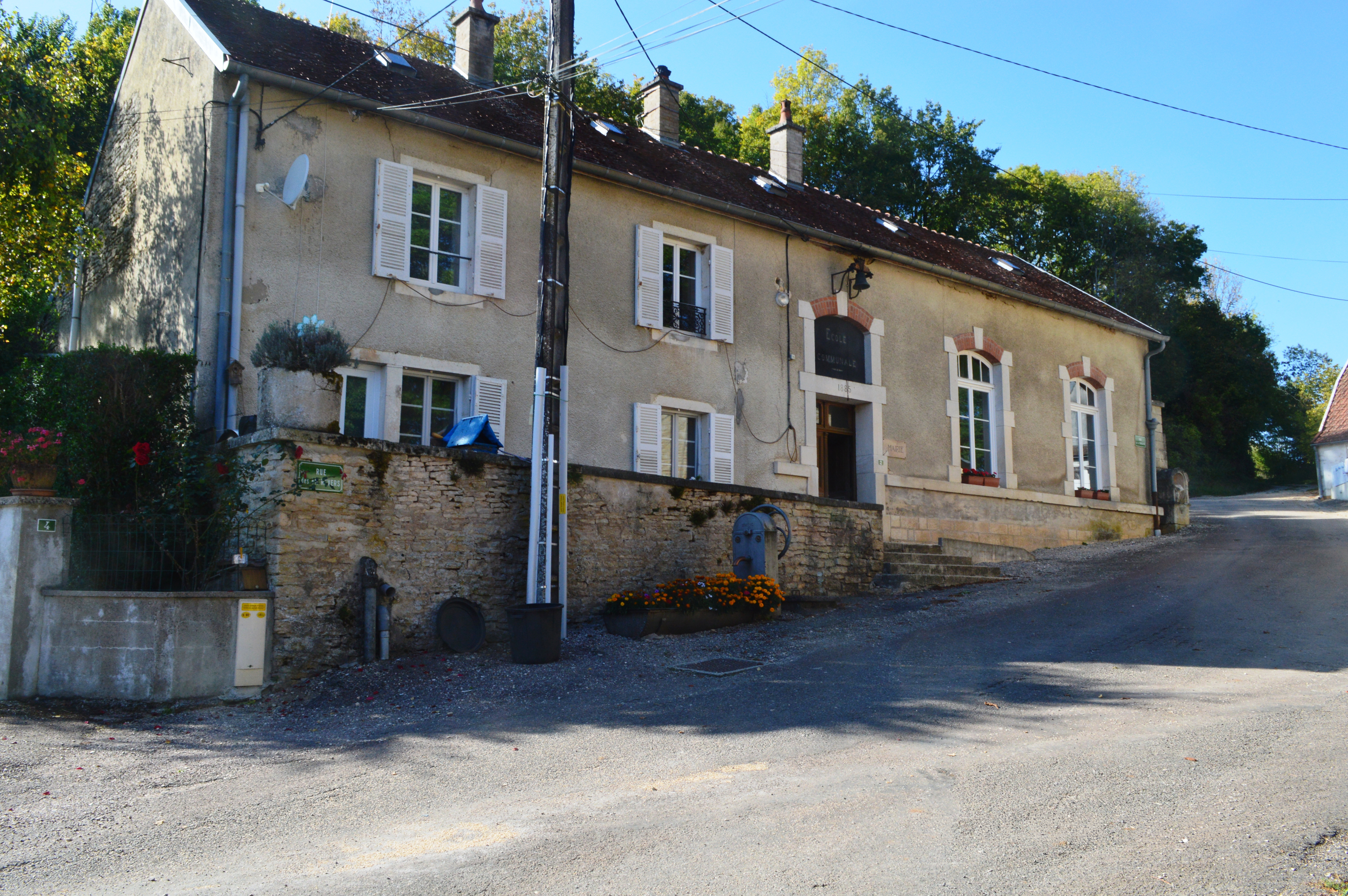
Avelanges School

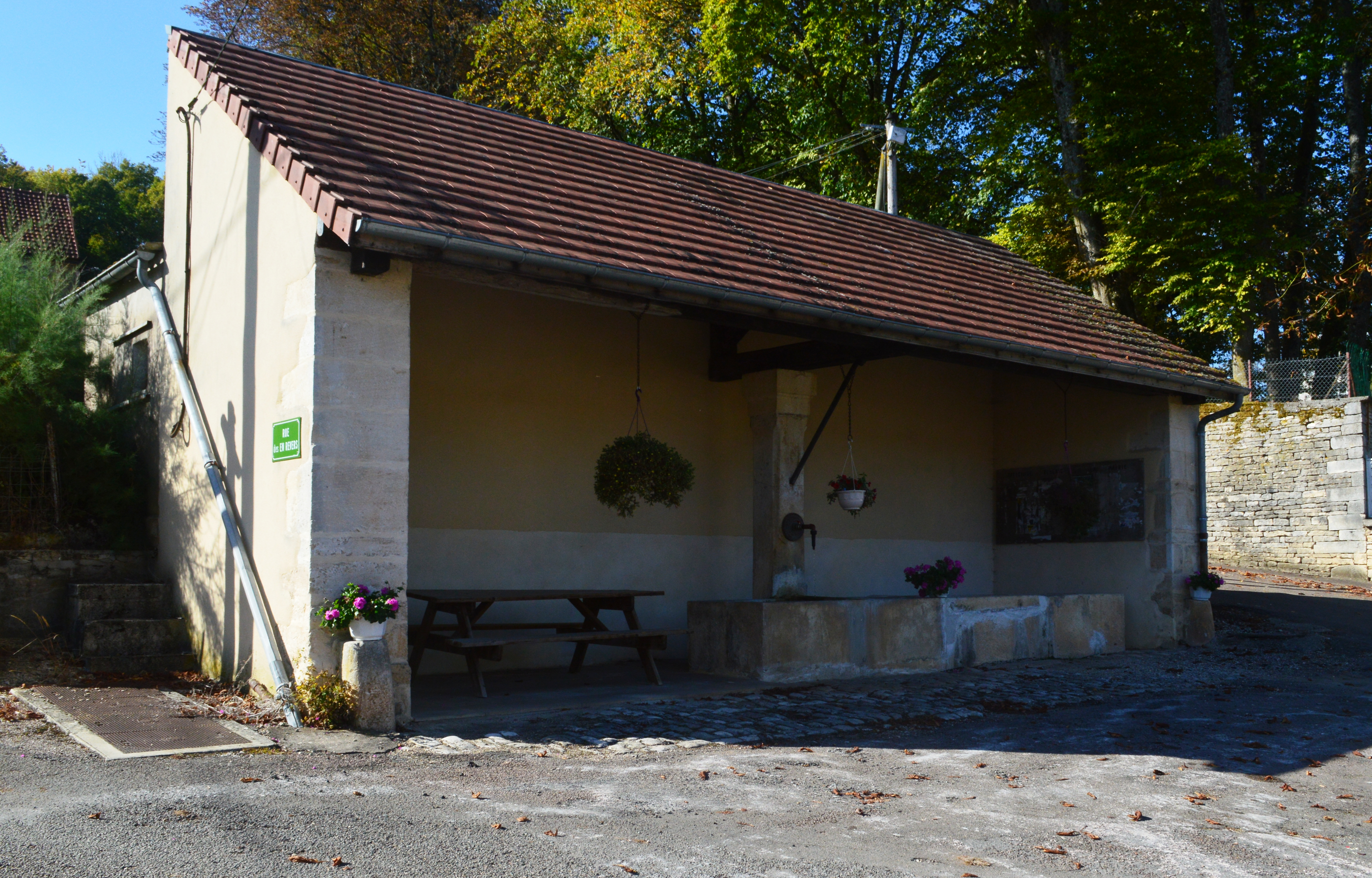
Avelanges Lavoir (Public Laundry)

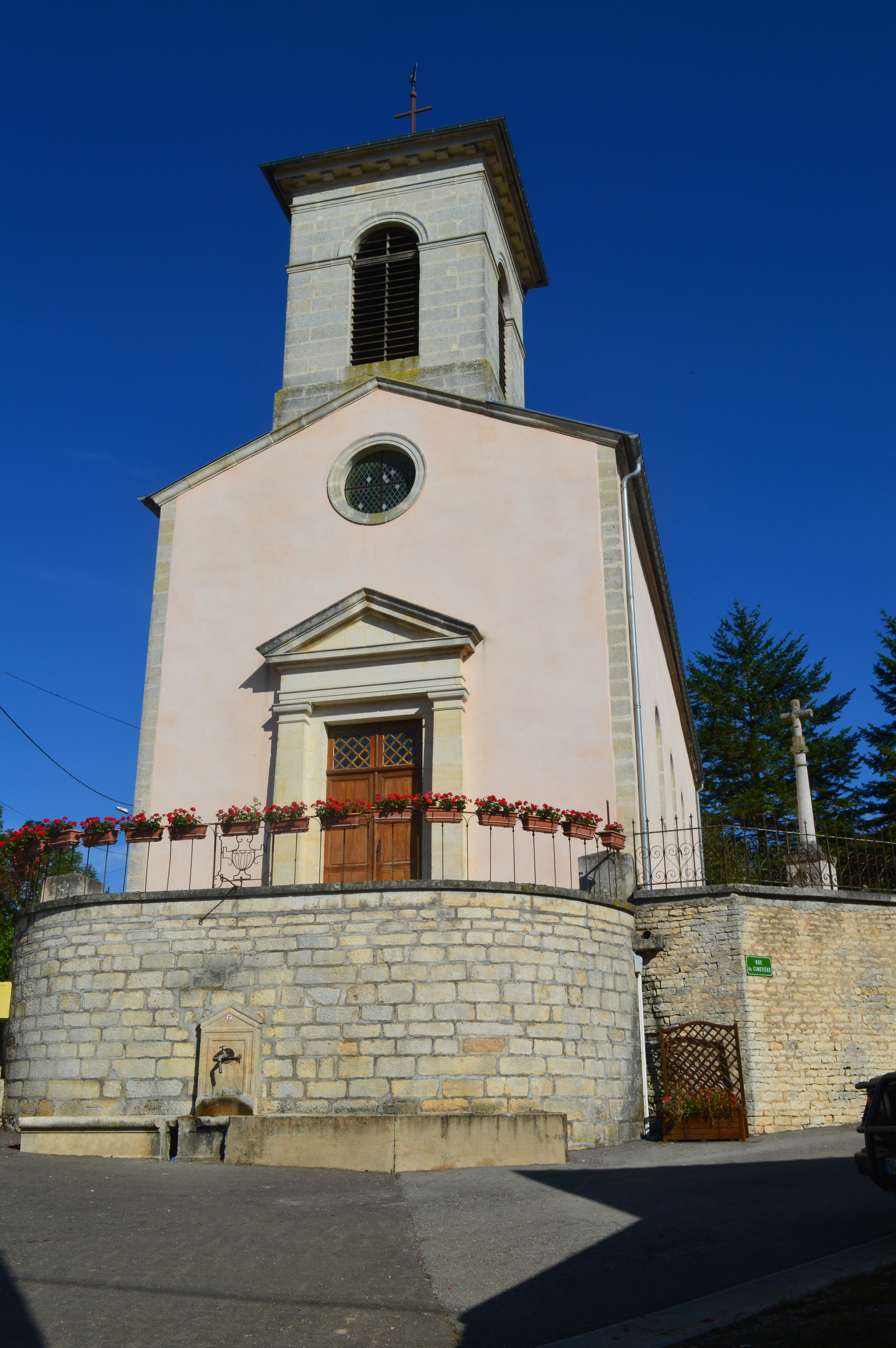
Avelanges Church

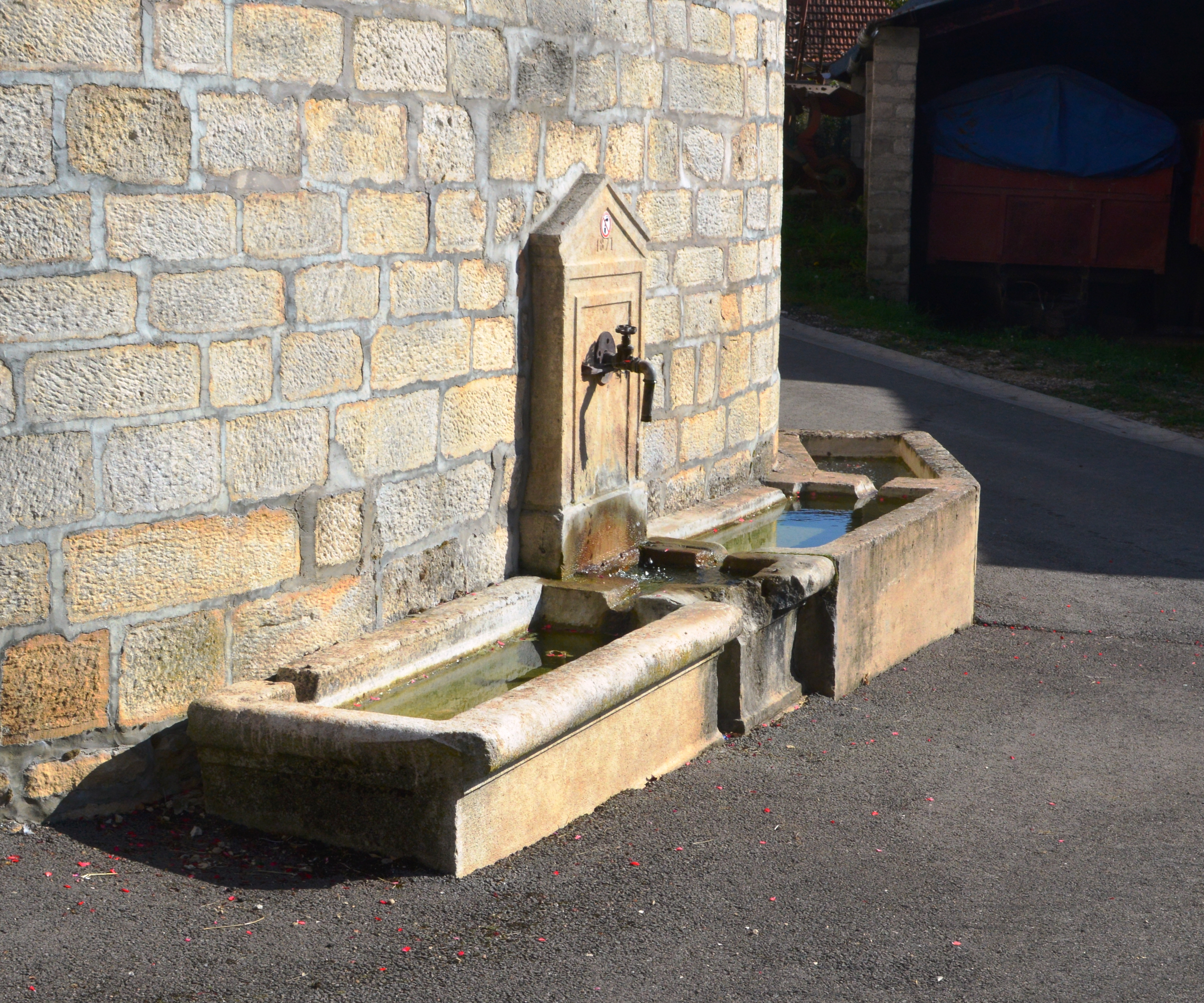
A Water Trough in Avalanges

== See also ==
- Communes of the Côte-d'Or department
