= Barjon =

- Commune
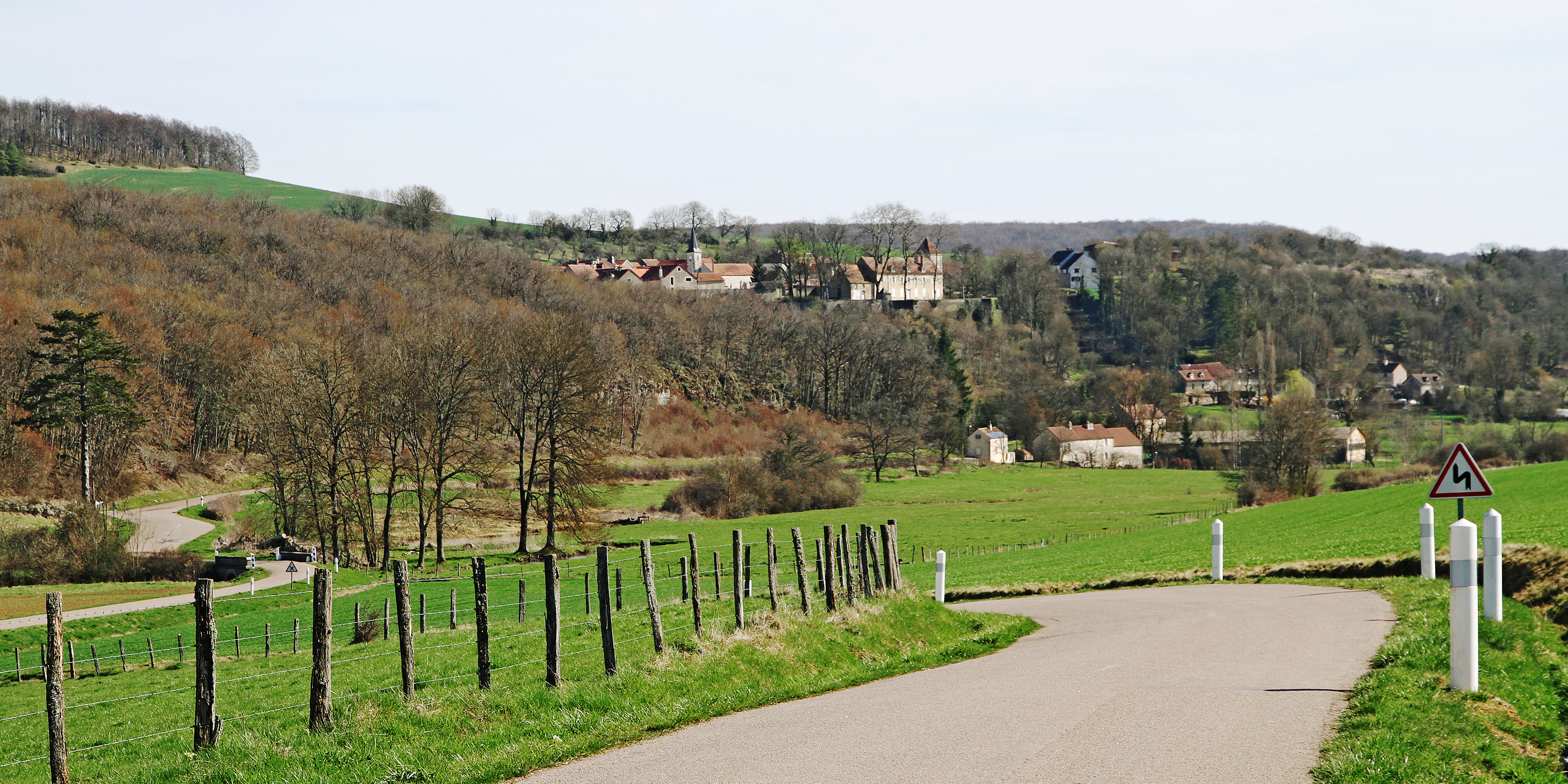
- A general view of Barjon

- Coat of arms
- Location of Barjon
- Location within France Location within Bourgogne-Franche-Comté
- Coordinates: 47°36′45″N 4°57′34″E
- Country: France
- Region: Bourgogne-Franche-Comté
- Department: Côte-d'Or
- Arrondissement: Dijon
- Canton: Is-sur-Tille
- Intercommunality: Tille et Venelle

Government
  - Mayor (2021–2026): Emilien Bonneau
- Area^{1}: 4.57 km^{2} (1.76 sq mi)
- Elevation: 456 m (1,496 ft)
- Highest elevation: 467 m (1,532 ft)
- Lowest elevation: 333 m (1,093 ft)
- Population (2023): 29
  - Density: 6.3/km^{2} (16/sq mi)
- Time zone: UTC+01:00 (CET)
  - Summer (DST): UTC+02:00 (CEST)
- INSEE/Postal code: 21049 /21580
- ^{1} French Land Register data, which excludes lakes, ponds, glaciers > 1 km^{2} (0.386 sq mi or 247 acres) and river estuaries.

Barjon (French pronunciation: [baʁʒɔ̃]) is a commune in the Côte-d'Or department in the Bourgogne-Franche-Comté region of eastern France.

== Geography ==
Barjon is located on the southern flank of Mont Mercure (469 m) at an altitude of 397 metres at the town hall. It is some 40 km south-west of Langres and 40 km north by north-west of Dijon. Access to the commune is by the D19 road from Salives in the west which passes through the village and continues east to Avot. The D19E goes north from the village to join the D190 on the northern border of the commune.

The commune is forested in the southern arm with the centre of the commune farmland and a band of forest around its borders.

La Tille stream forms the south-western border of the commune as it flows east across the "neck" of the commune then forms part of the eastern border before continuing east to join La Creuse at Avot. La Tille de Barjon rises just east of the commune and flows south near the eastern border to join La Tille. Le Volgrain stream rises north-west of the commune and flows south down the western side of the commune and joins La Tille just south-west of the village.

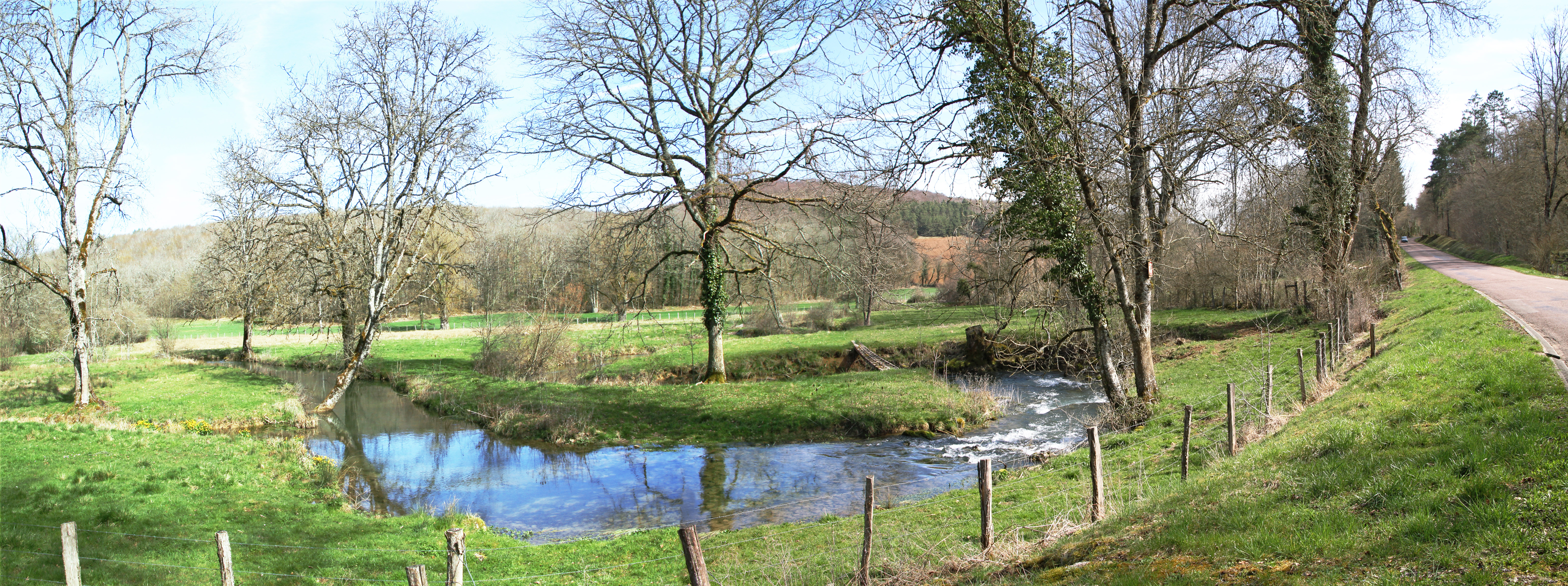
La Tille on the commune border with Avot

== Climate ==
In 2010, the climate of the commune was of the mountain margin climate type, according to a study by the National Centre for Scientific Research based on a series of data covering the period 1971-2000. In 2020, Météo-France published a typology of the climates of metropolitan France - the commune is exposed to an altered oceanic climate and is in the Lorraine, Langres plateau, Morvan climatic region, characterized by a harsh winter (1.5° C), moderate winds and frequent fogs in autumn and winter.

For the period 1971-2000, the average annual temperature was 10° C, with an annual temperature range of 16.9° C. The average annual cumulative precipitation was 1,027 mm, with 13.9 days of precipitation in January and 9.1 days in July.

== History ==
Saint Frodulphe de Barjon, the Abbot of Saint Martin, retired as a hermit to Barjon.

Barjon appears as Barjon on the 1750 Cassini Map and the same on the 1790 version.

=== Heraldry ===
Arms of Barjon	The official status of the blazon remains to be determined. Blazon: Party per pale, at 1 argent a trefoil azure between 3 roundels gules 2 at honour point 1 at nombril point; at 2 azure a griffin of Or.

== Administration ==
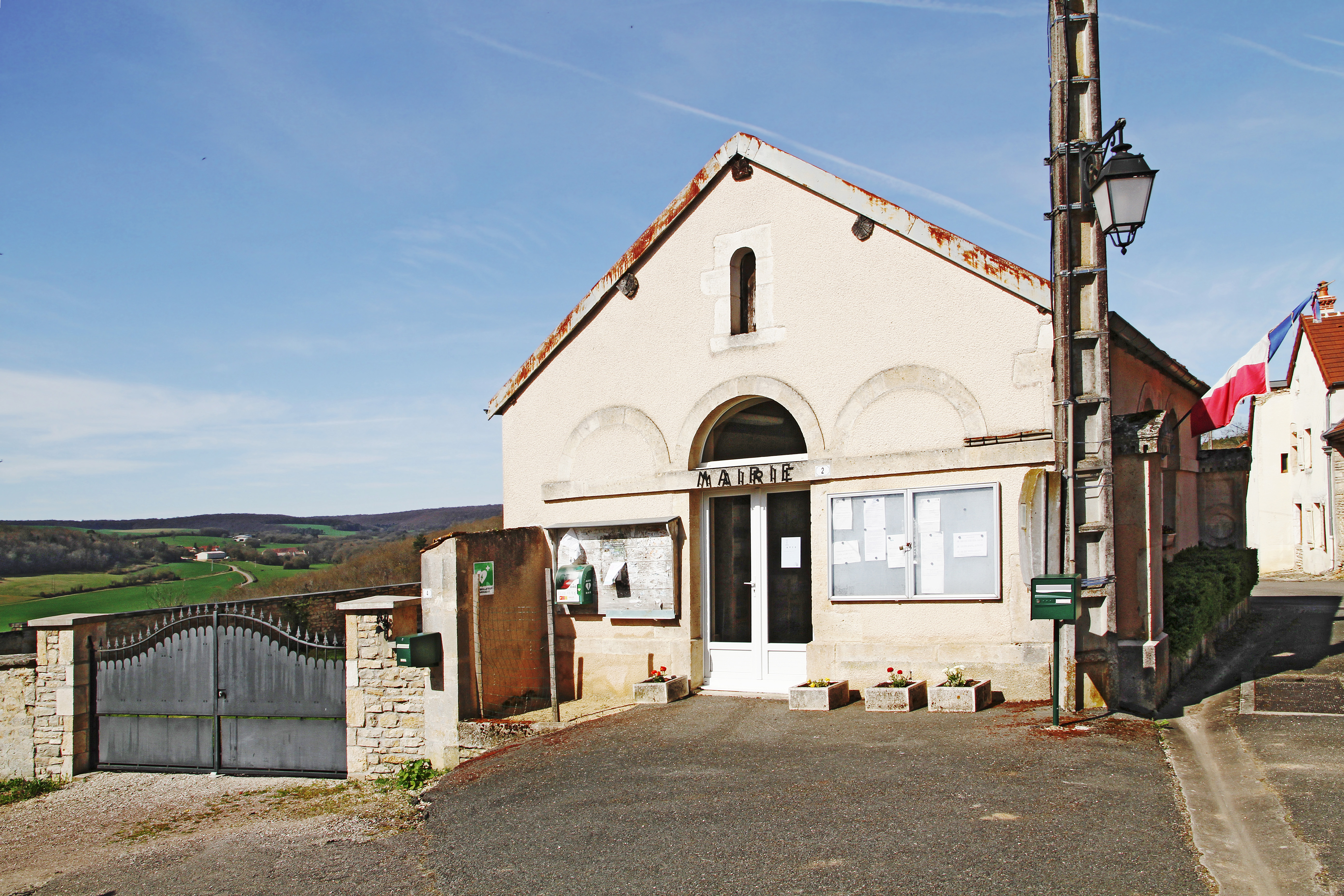
The Town Hall

List of Successive Mayors

From	To	Name
2001	2020	Alain Guyot
2020	2021	Maurice Frachisse
2021	2026	Emilien Bonneau

== Demography ==
The inhabitants of the commune are known as Barjonais in French.

Historical population

Year	Pop.	±% p.a.
1793	270	—
1821	168	−1.68%
1846	152	−0.40%
1872	123	−0.81%
1901	68	−2.02%
1926	60	−0.50%
1946	66	+0.48%
1962	42	−2.79%
1968	42	+0.00%

Year	Pop.	±% p.a.
1975	32	−3.81%
1982	32	+0.00%
1990	34	+0.76%
1999	37	+0.94%
2007	42	+1.60%
2012	36	−3.04%
2017	41	+2.64%
2023	29	−5.61%

Source: EHESS and INSEE

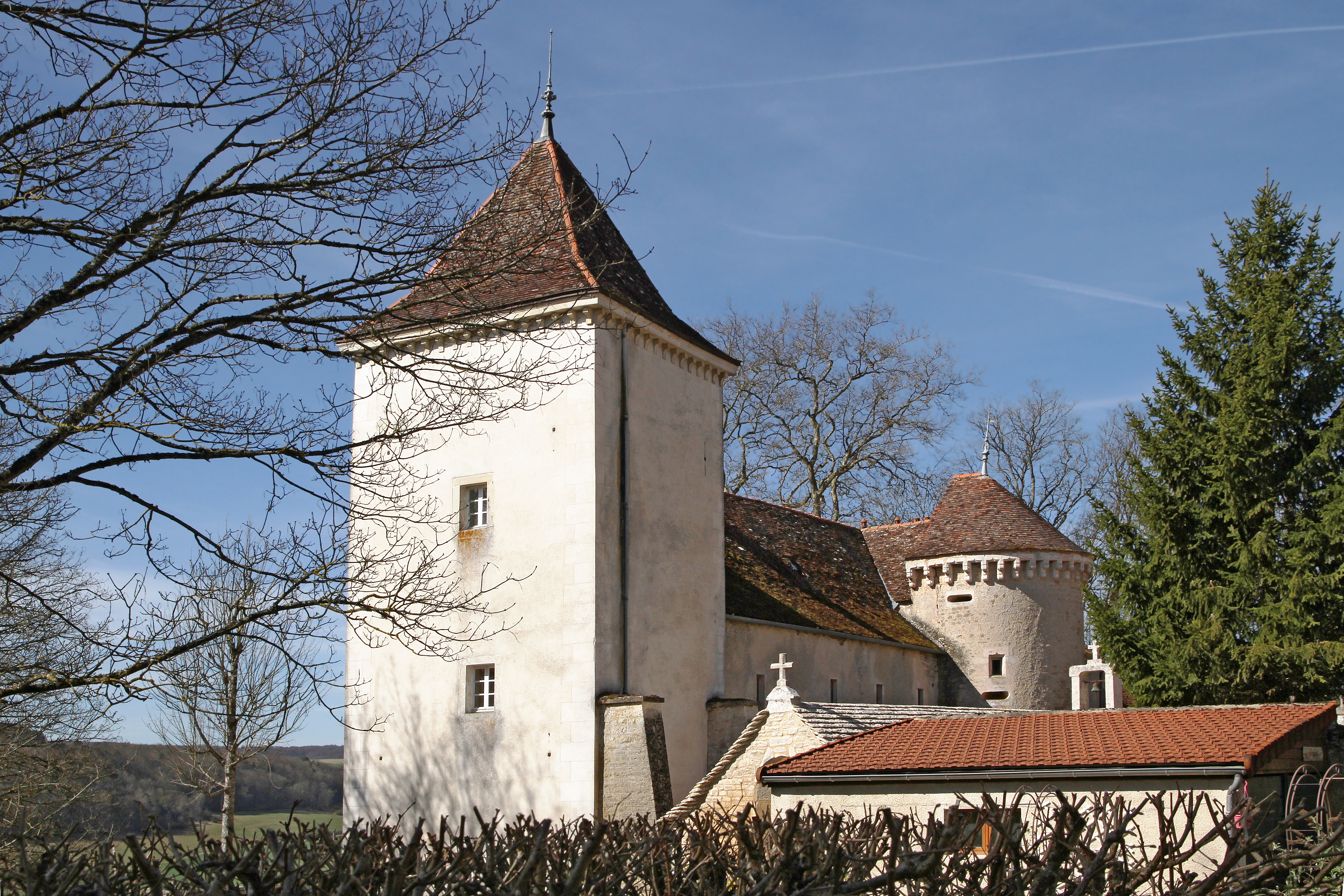
The Chateau

== Culture and heritage ==
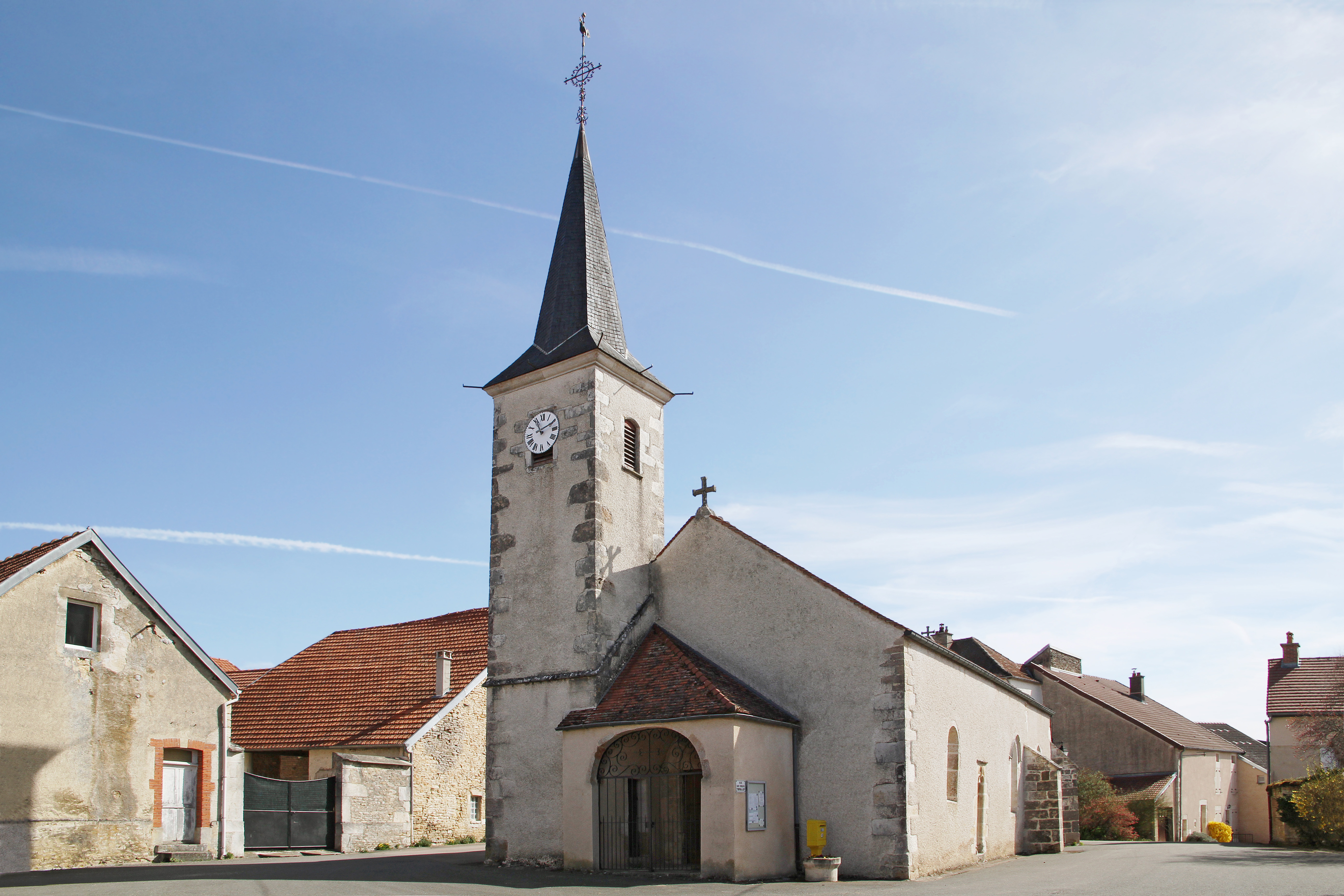
The Church

=== Religious heritage ===
The commune has a Cemetery Cross (15th century) which is registered as an historical monument.

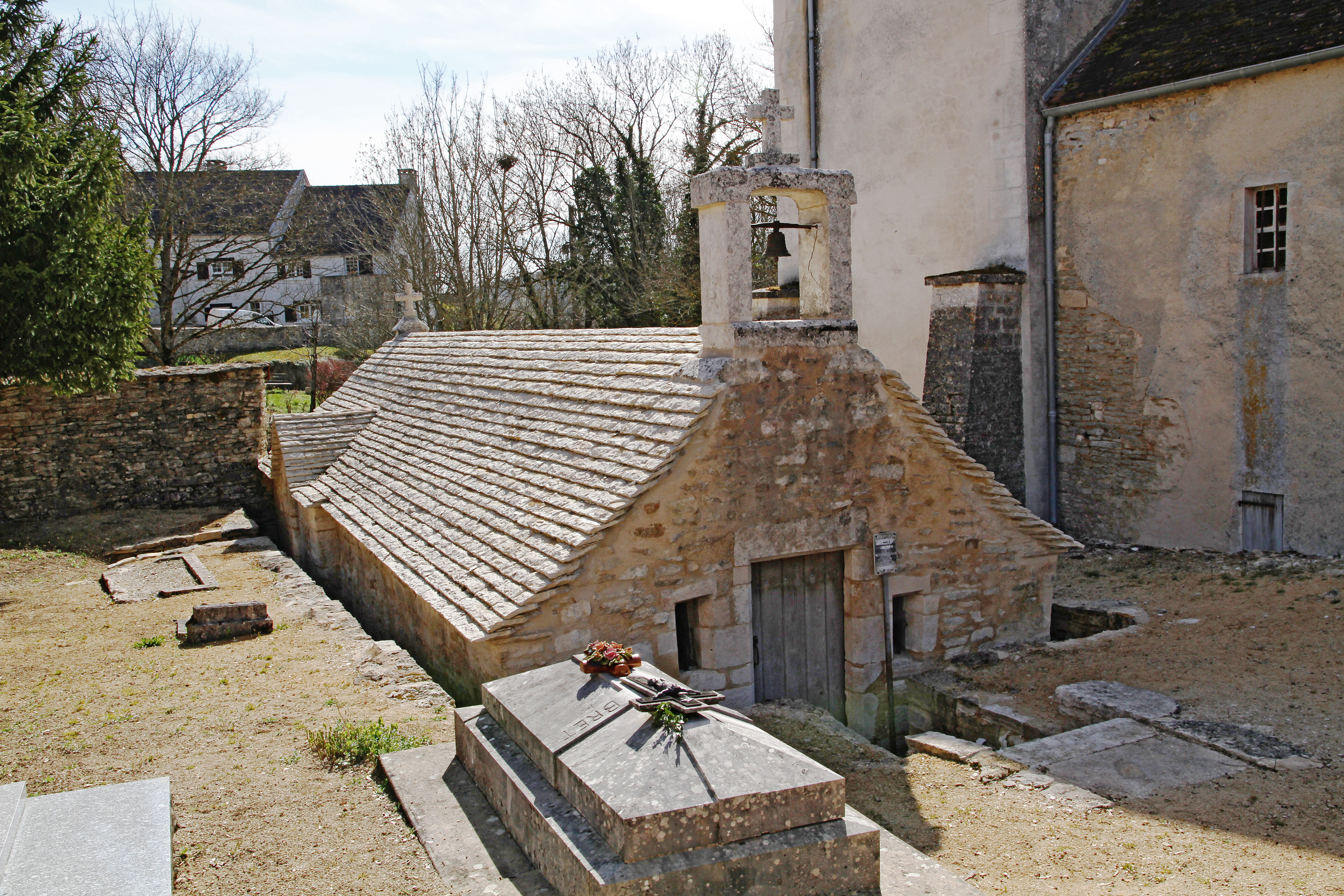
The Chapel of Saint Frodulphe in the Cemetery

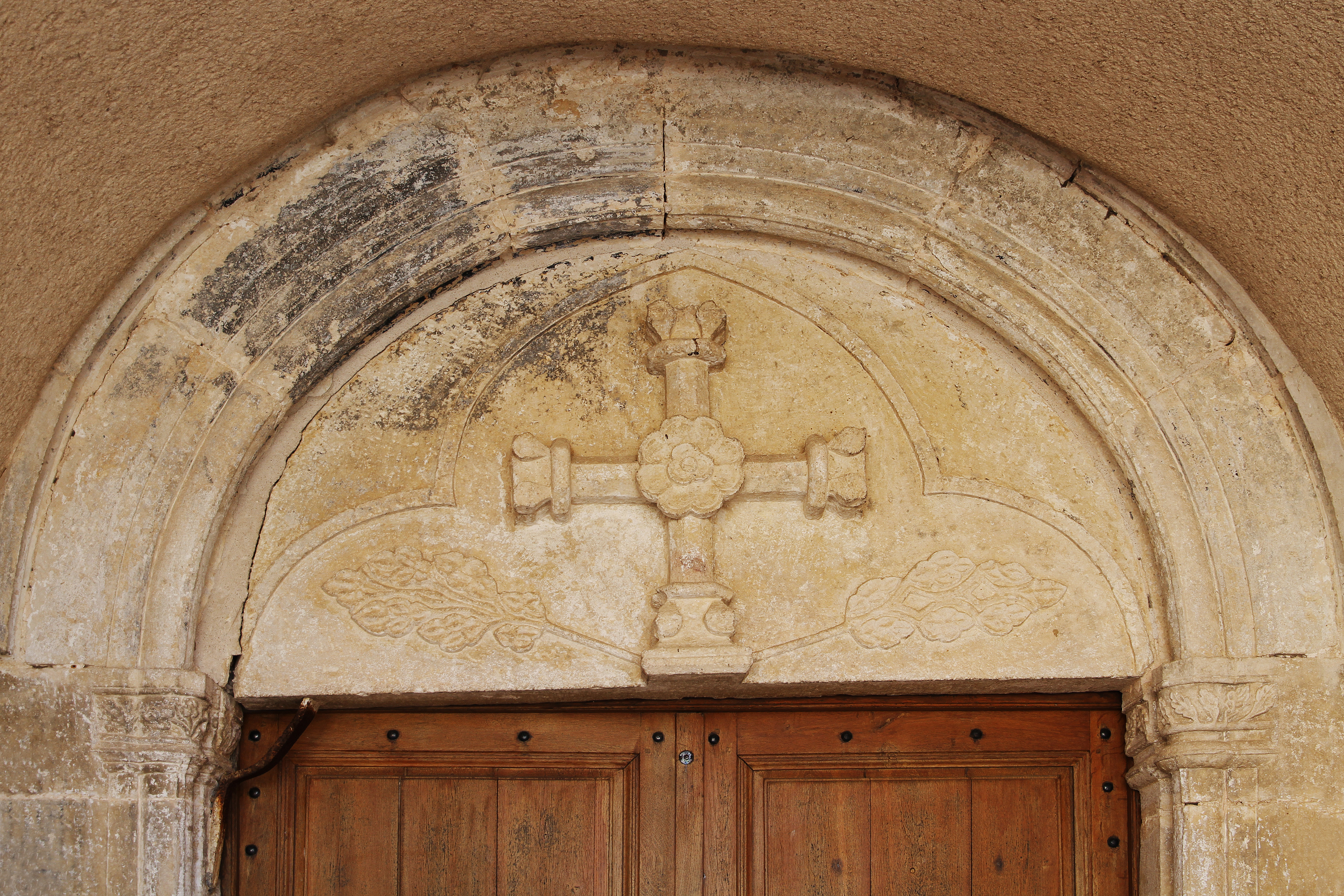
14th century lintel in the Church

The Church contains several items that are registered as historical objects:

- A Statue: Saint John the Evangelist (17th century)
- A Statue: Saint Madeleine (16th century)
- A Group Sculpture: Virgin of Pity (17th century)
- The Sarcophagus of Saint Frodulphe (8th century)
- A Statue: Saint Benigne (15th century)
- A Shrine to Saint Frodulphe (17th century)
- A Shrine to Saint Frodulphe (17th century)
- A Statue: Saint Roch (17th century)
- A Statue: Saint Frodulphe (17th century)

== See also ==
- Communes of the Côte-d'Or department
