= Avot, Côte-d'Or =

Avot
- Commune
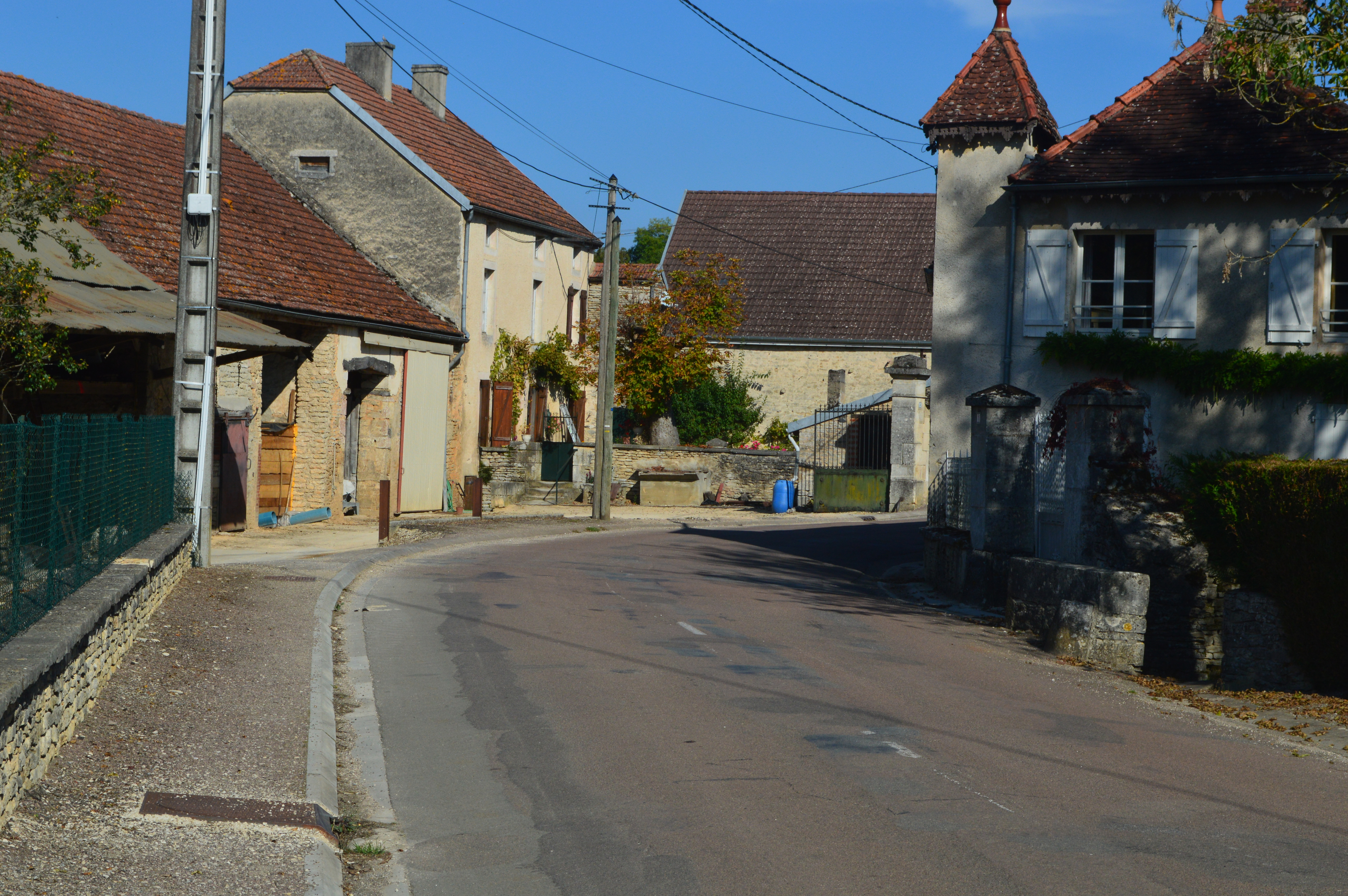
- A street in Avot

- Coat of arms
- Location of Avot
- Location within France Location within Bourgogne-Franche-Comté
- Coordinates: 47°37′09″N 5°00′48″E
- Country: France
- Region: Bourgogne-Franche-Comté
- Department: Côte-d'Or
- Arrondissement: Dijon
- Canton: Is-sur-Tille
- Intercommunality: CC Tille Venelle

Government
  - Mayor (2020–2026): Bernard Guillemot
- Area^{1}: 21.67 km^{2} (8.37 sq mi)
- Elevation: 315 m (1,033 ft)
- Highest elevation: 501 m (1,644 ft)
- Lowest elevation: 307 m (1,007 ft)
- Population (2023): 186
  - Density: 8.58/km^{2} (22.2/sq mi)
- Time zone: UTC+01:00 (CET)
  - Summer (DST): UTC+02:00 (CEST)
- INSEE/Postal code: 21041 /21580
- ^{1} French Land Register data, which excludes lakes, ponds, glaciers > 1 km^{2} (0.386 sq mi or 247 acres) and river estuaries.

Avot (French pronunciation: [avo]) is a commune in the Côte-d'Or department in the Bourgogne-Franche-Comté region of eastern France.

== Geography ==
Avot is located some 40 km north by north-west of Dijon and 17 km west by north-west of Selongey. Access to the commune is by road D19 from Salives in the west which passes through the centre of the commune and the village before continuing east to join the D959 north of Marey-sur-Tille. The D19K goes north from the village to join the D112C east of Fraignot-et-Vesvrotte. Most of the commune is heavily forested with some small areas of farmland.

The Tille river flows through the heart of the commune from west to east then continues southwards to join the Saône near Les Maillys. The Creuse flows from the north of the commune and joins the Tille at the village.

=== Heraldry ===
Arms of Avot	Blazon: Gules on a cross Argent 5 mullets Azure.

== Administration ==
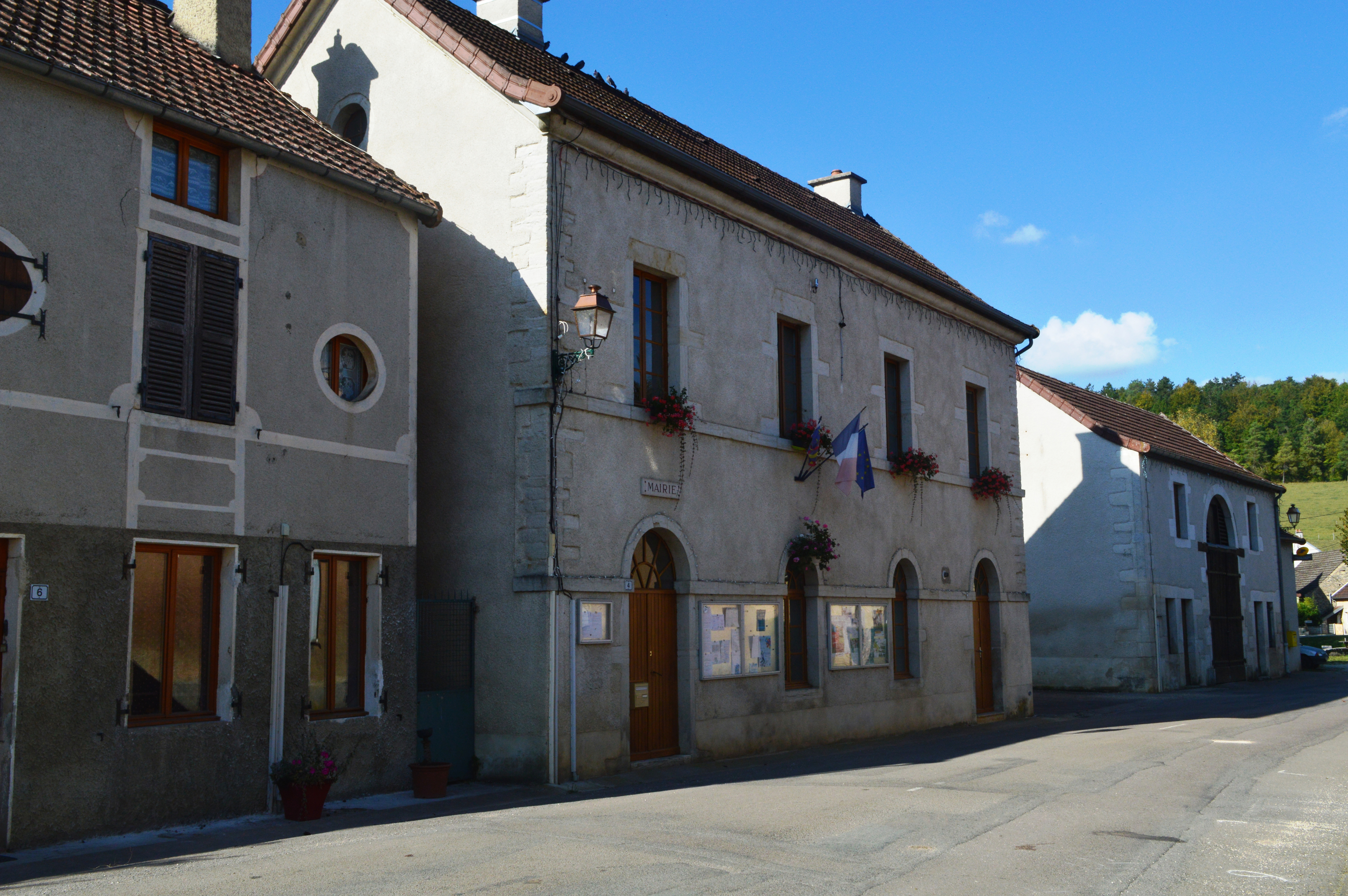
The Town Hall

List of Successive Mayors

From	To	Name
2001	2008	Joël Leroy
2008	2026	Bernard Guillemot

== Demography ==
Historical population

Year	Pop.	±% p.a.
1793	265	—
1821	273	+0.11%
1846	343	+0.92%
1872	266	−0.97%
1901	234	−0.44%
1926	220	−0.25%
1946	230	+0.22%
1962	178	−1.59%
1968	174	−0.38%

Year	Pop.	±% p.a.
1975	202	+2.15%
1982	174	−2.11%
1990	150	−1.84%
1999	141	−0.69%
2007	135	−0.54%
2012	163	+3.84%
2017	187	+2.79%
2023	186	−0.09%

Source: EHESS and INSEE

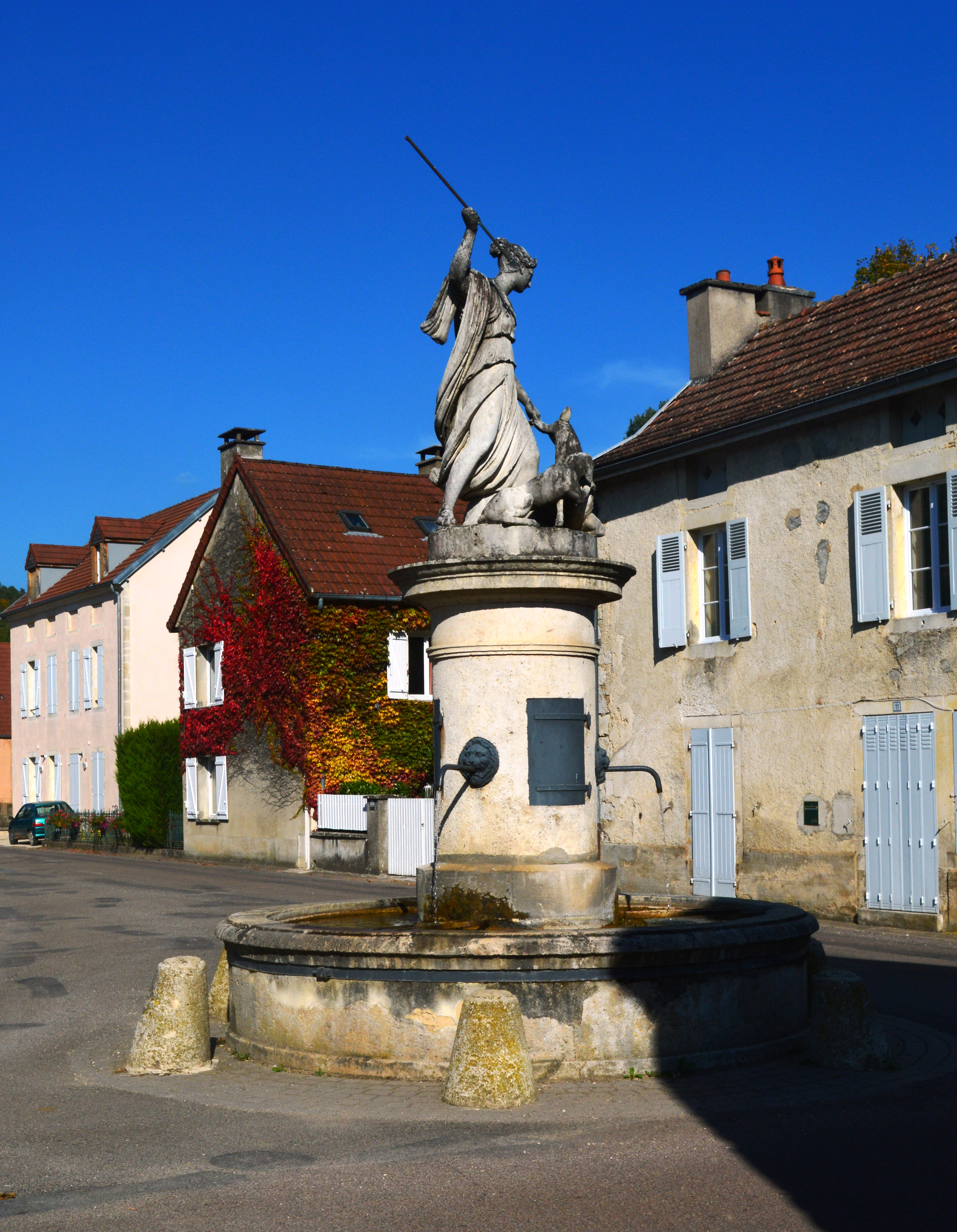
A Water Trough in Avot

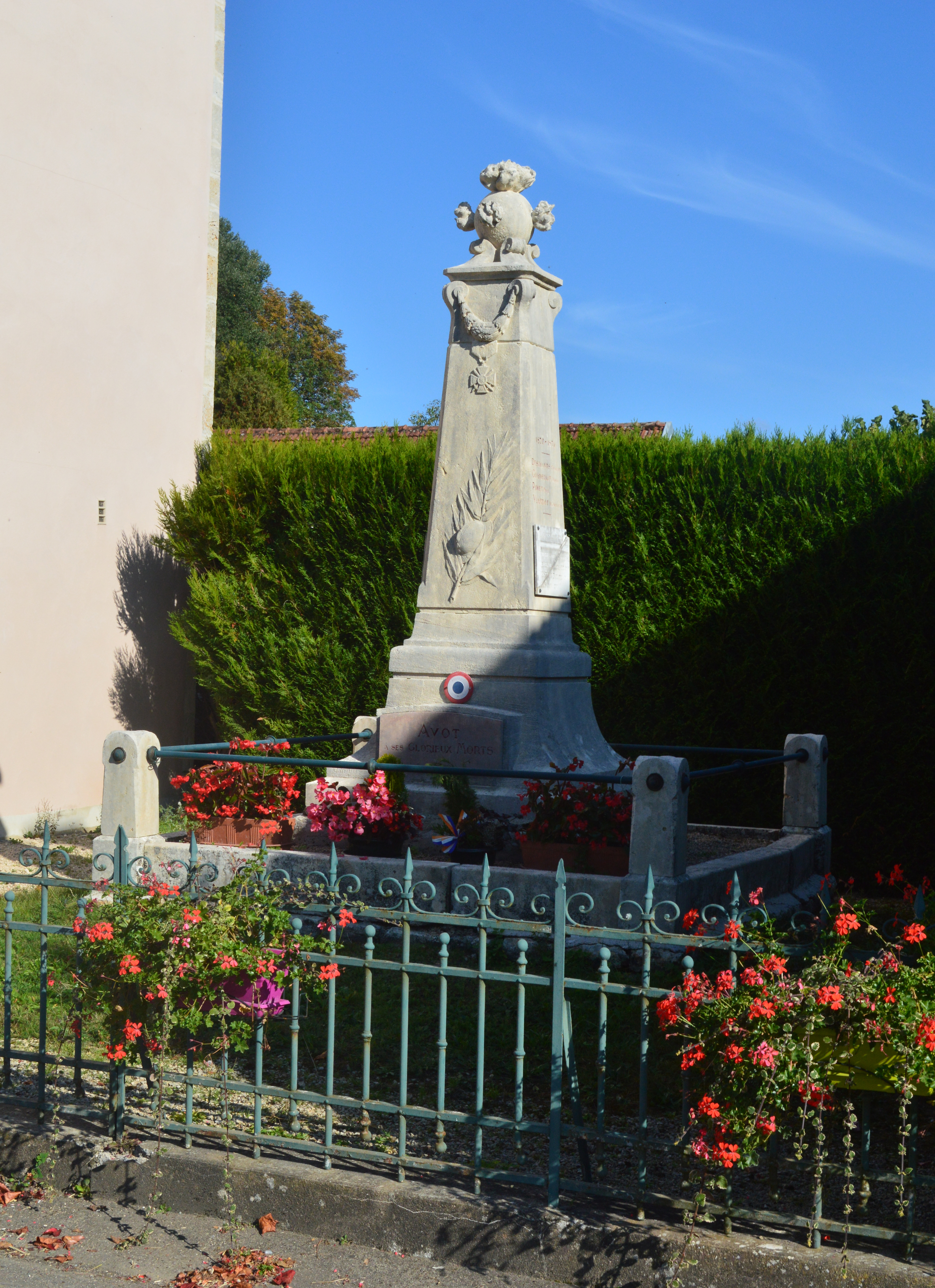
Avot War Memorial

== Avot Picture Gallery ==
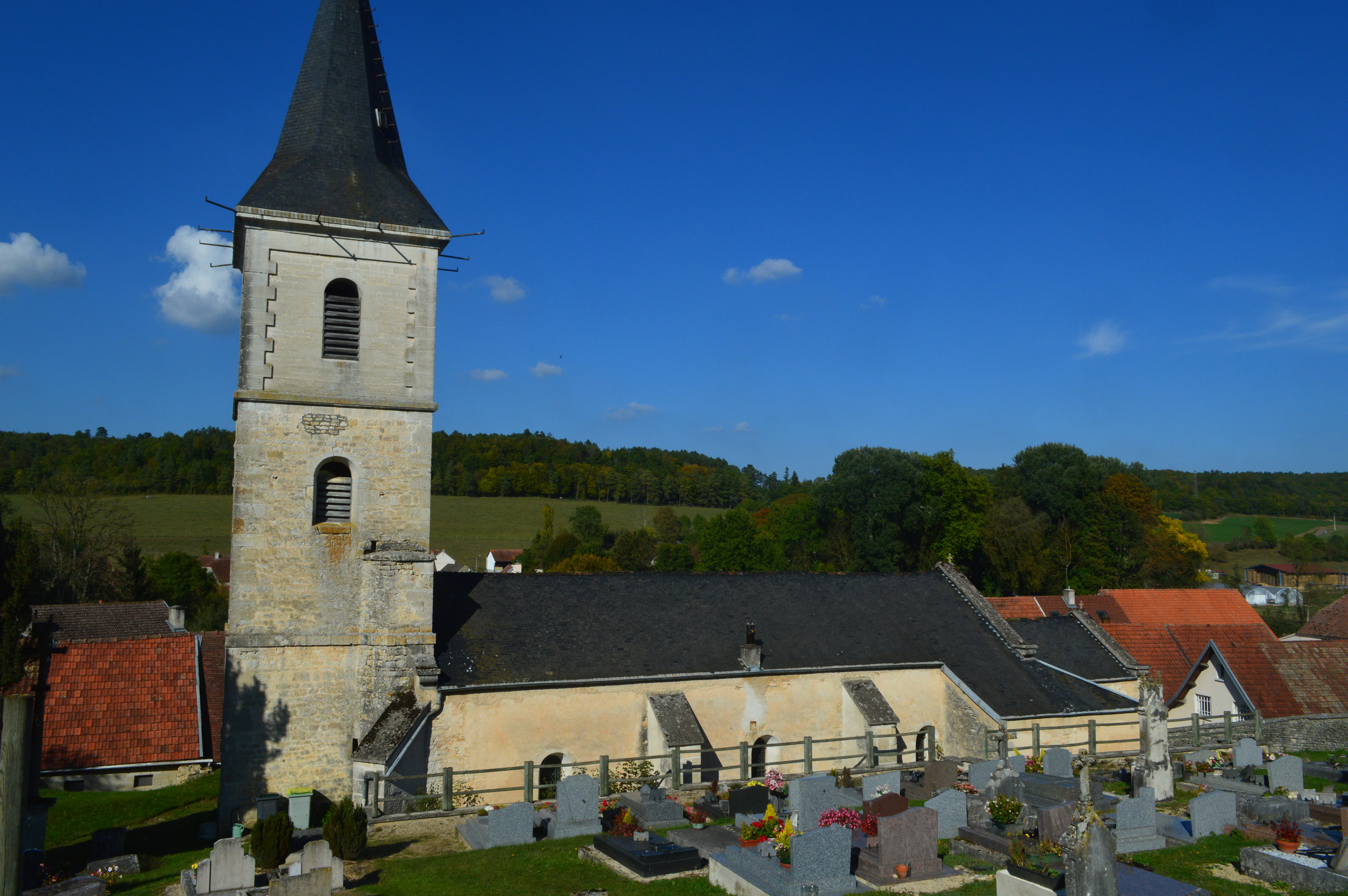
Avot Church

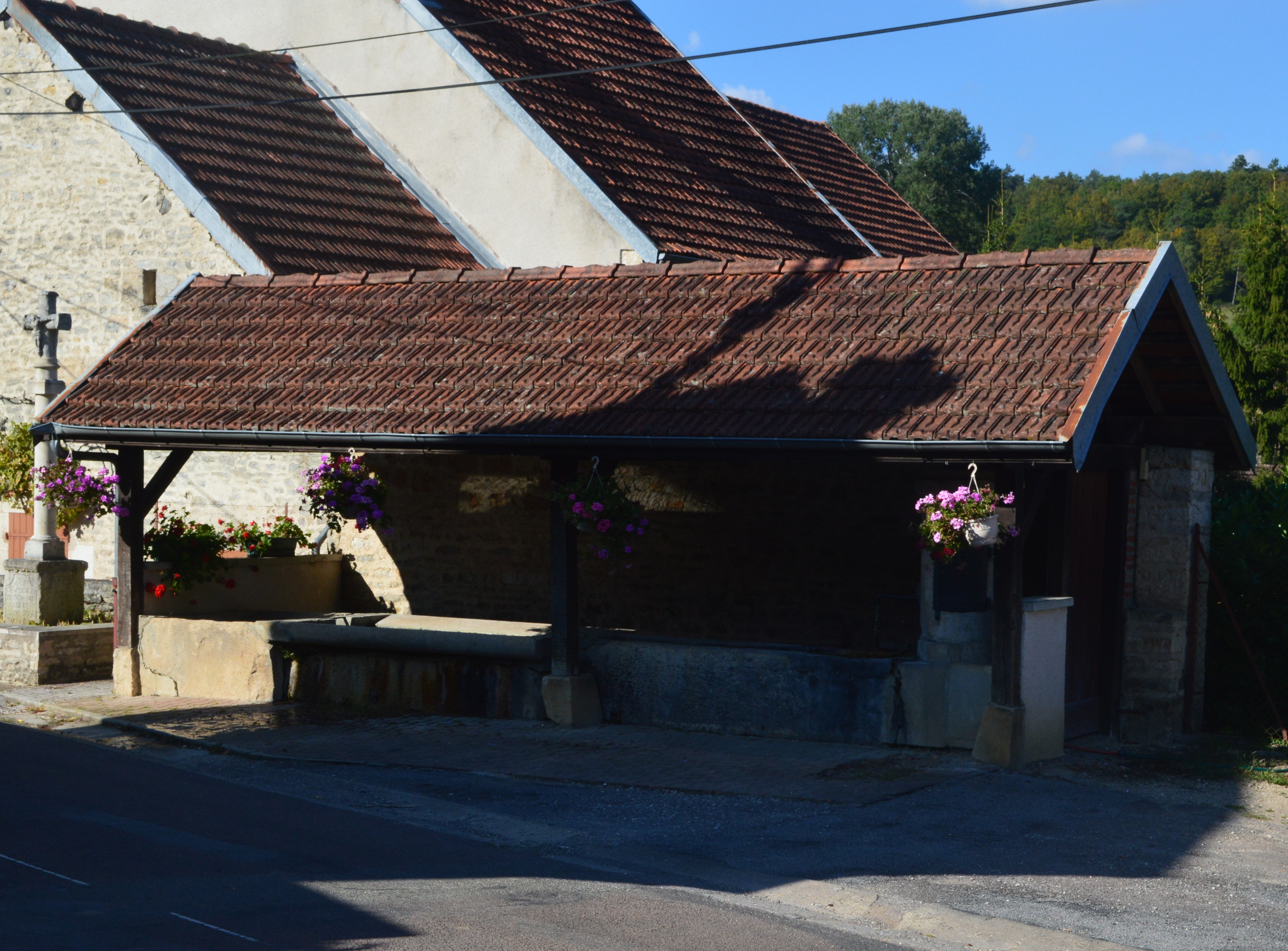
A Lavoir (Public Laundry) in Avot

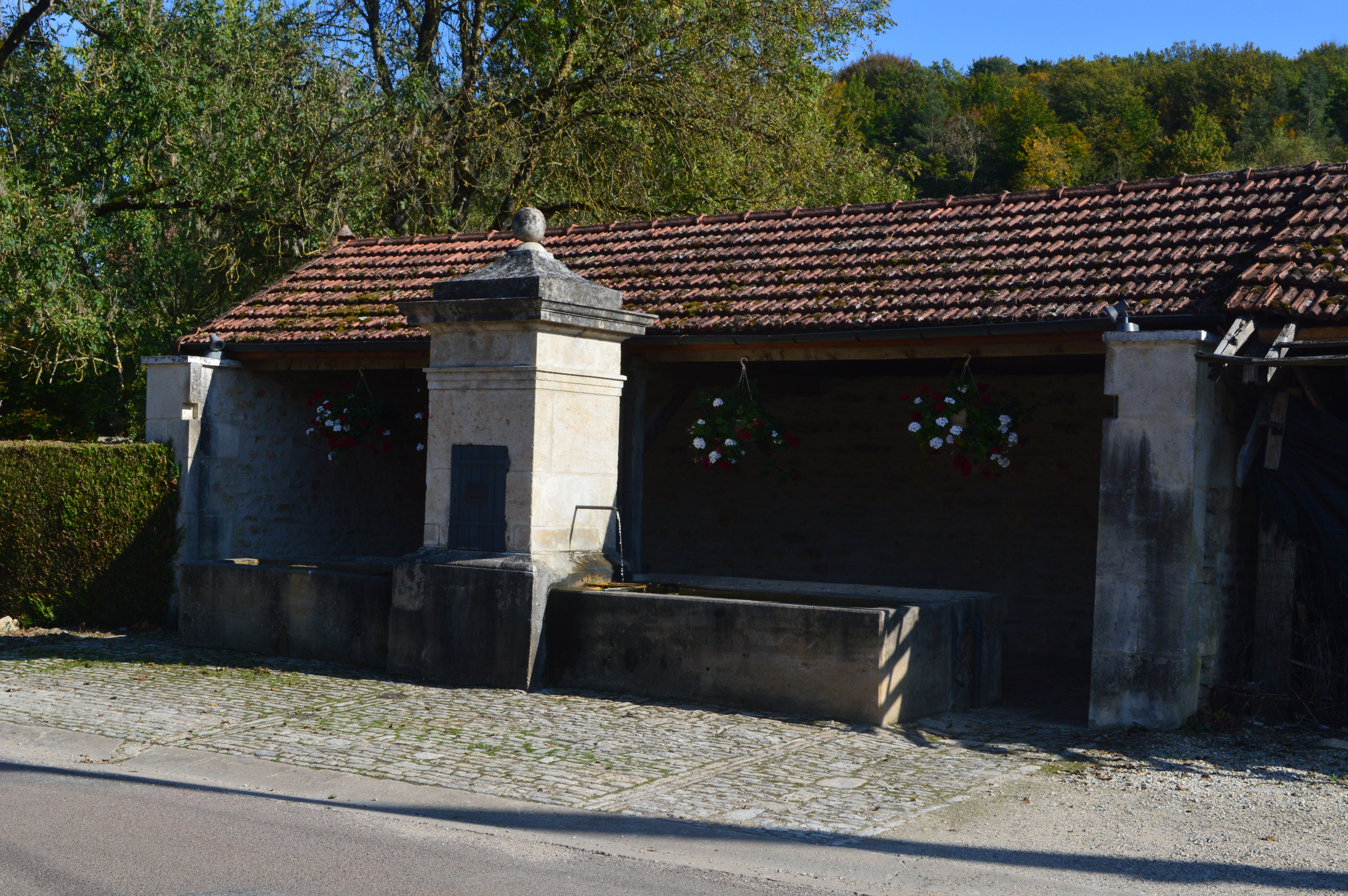
A Lavoir (Public Laundry) in Avot

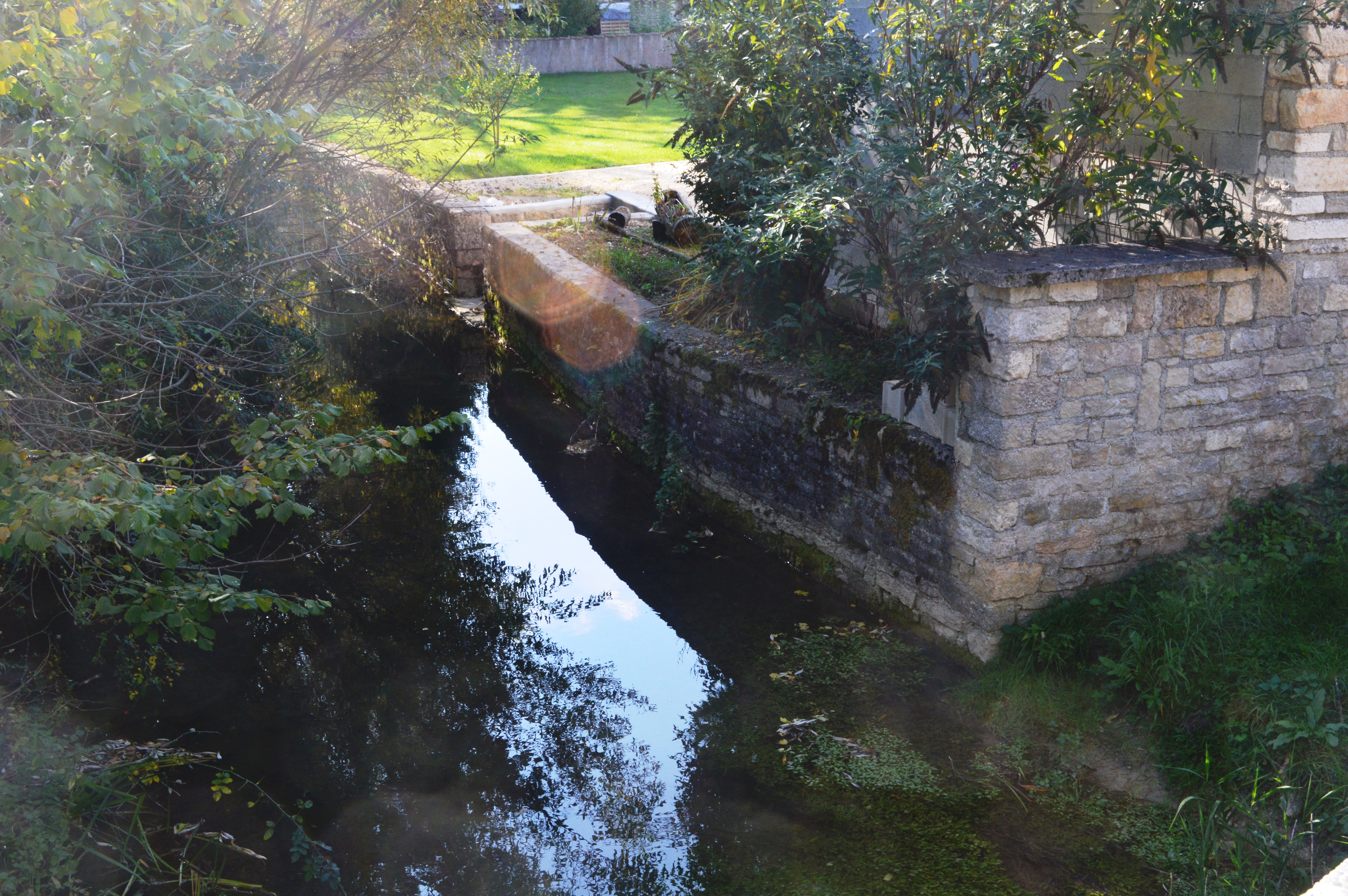
The Tille river at Avot

== See also ==
- Communes of the Côte-d'Or department
