= Selongey =

- Commune
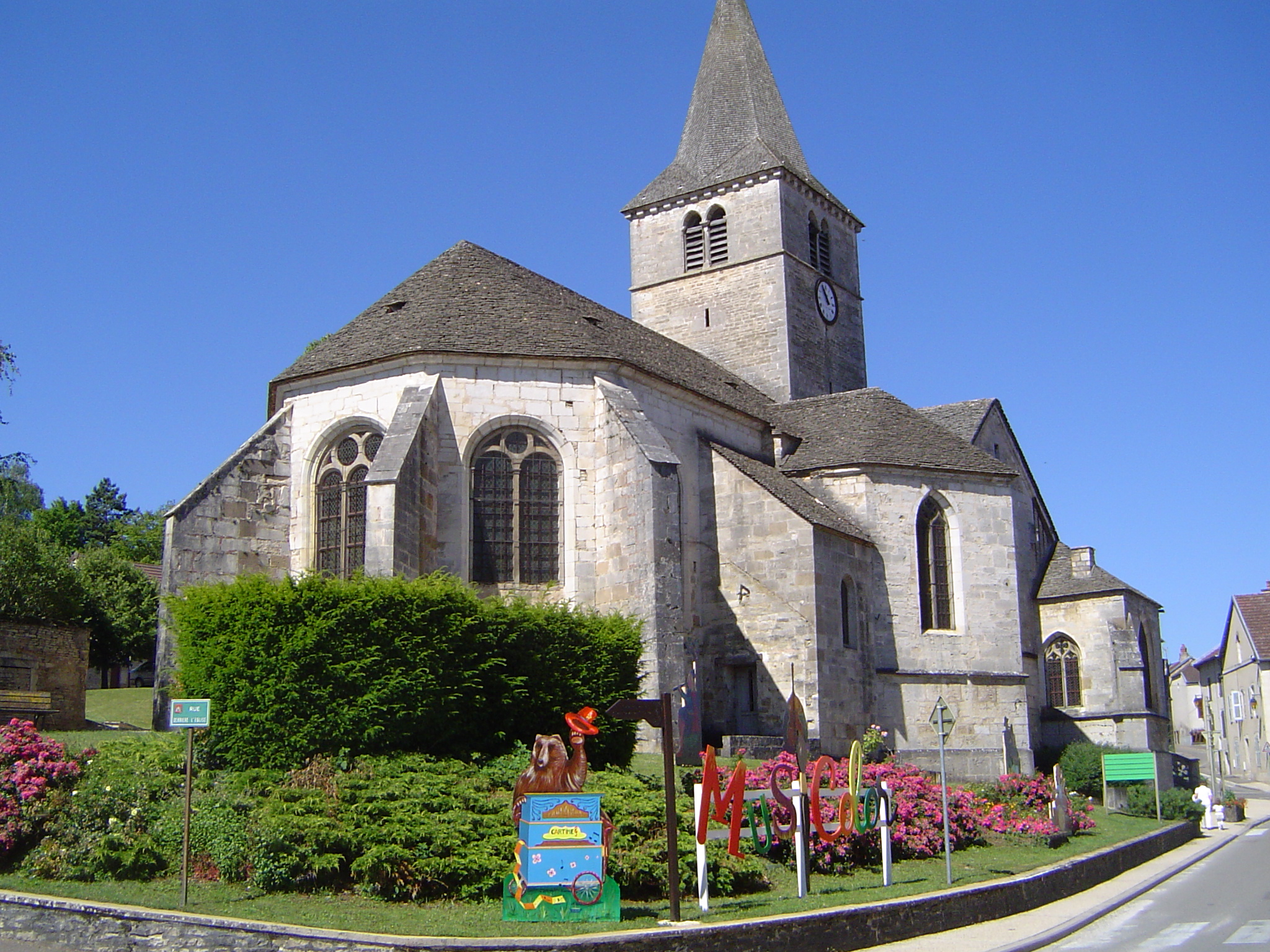
- The church in Selongey

- Coat of arms
- Location of Selongey
- Location within France Location within Bourgogne-Franche-Comté
- Coordinates: 47°35′19″N 5°11′11″E
- Country: France
- Region: Bourgogne-Franche-Comté
- Department: Côte-d'Or
- Arrondissement: Dijon
- Canton: Is-sur-Tille
- Intercommunality: Tille et Venelle

Government
  - Mayor (2020–2026): Gérard Leguay
- Area^{1}: 46.42 km^{2} (17.92 sq mi)
- Highest elevation: 464 m (1,522 ft)
- Lowest elevation: 278 m (912 ft)
- Population (2023): 2,395
  - Density: 51.59/km^{2} (133.6/sq mi)
- Time zone: UTC+01:00 (CET)
  - Summer (DST): UTC+02:00 (CEST)
- INSEE/Postal code: 21599 /21260
- ^{1} French Land Register data, which excludes lakes, ponds, glaciers > 1 km^{2} (0.386 sq mi or 247 acres) and river estuaries.

Selongey (French pronunciation: [səlɔ̃ʒɛ]) is a commune in the Côte-d'Or department in eastern France.

== Population ==
Historical population
Year	Pop.	±% p.a.
1968	2,102	—
1975	2,363	+1.69%
1982	2,519	+0.92%
1990	2,386	−0.68%
1999	2,233	−0.73%
2007	2,272	+0.22%
2012	2,426	+1.32%
2017	2,403	−0.19%
2023	2,395	−0.06%
Source: INSEE

== See also ==
- Communes of the Côte-d'Or department
