= Marey-sur-Tille =

- Commune
- Location of Marey-sur-Tille
- Location within France Location within Bourgogne-Franche-Comté
- Coordinates: 47°35′56″N 5°04′54″E
- Country: France
- Region: Bourgogne-Franche-Comté
- Department: Côte-d'Or
- Arrondissement: Dijon
- Canton: Is-sur-Tille

Government
  - Mayor (2020–2026): Christian Bailleul
- Area^{1}: 30.15 km^{2} (11.64 sq mi)
- Elevation: 297 m (974 ft)
- Highest elevation: 469 m (1,539 ft)
- Lowest elevation: 281 m (922 ft)
- Population (2023): 330
  - Density: 11/km^{2} (28/sq mi)
- Time zone: UTC+01:00 (CET)
  - Summer (DST): UTC+02:00 (CEST)
- INSEE/Postal code: 21385 /21120
- ^{1} French Land Register data, which excludes lakes, ponds, glaciers > 1 km^{2} (0.386 sq mi or 247 acres) and river estuaries.

Marey-sur-Tille (French pronunciation: [maʁɛ syʁ tij], literally Marey on Tille) is a commune in the Côte-d'Or department in eastern France.

== Population ==
Historical population
Year	Pop.	±% p.a.
1968	274	—
1975	253	−1.13%
1982	310	+2.95%
1990	337	+1.05%
1999	301	−1.25%
2007	326	+1.00%
2012	319	−0.43%
2017	323	+0.25%
2023	330	+0.36%
Source: INSEE

== See also ==
- Communes of the Côte-d'Or department
