= Canton of Dijon-2 =

Coordinates: 47.33°N 5.05°E

The canton of Dijon-2 is an administrative division of the Côte-d'Or department, eastern France. Its borders were modified at the French canton reorganisation which came into effect in March 2015. Its seat is in Dijon.

It consists of the following communes:

1. Dijon (partly)
