= Salives =

- Commune
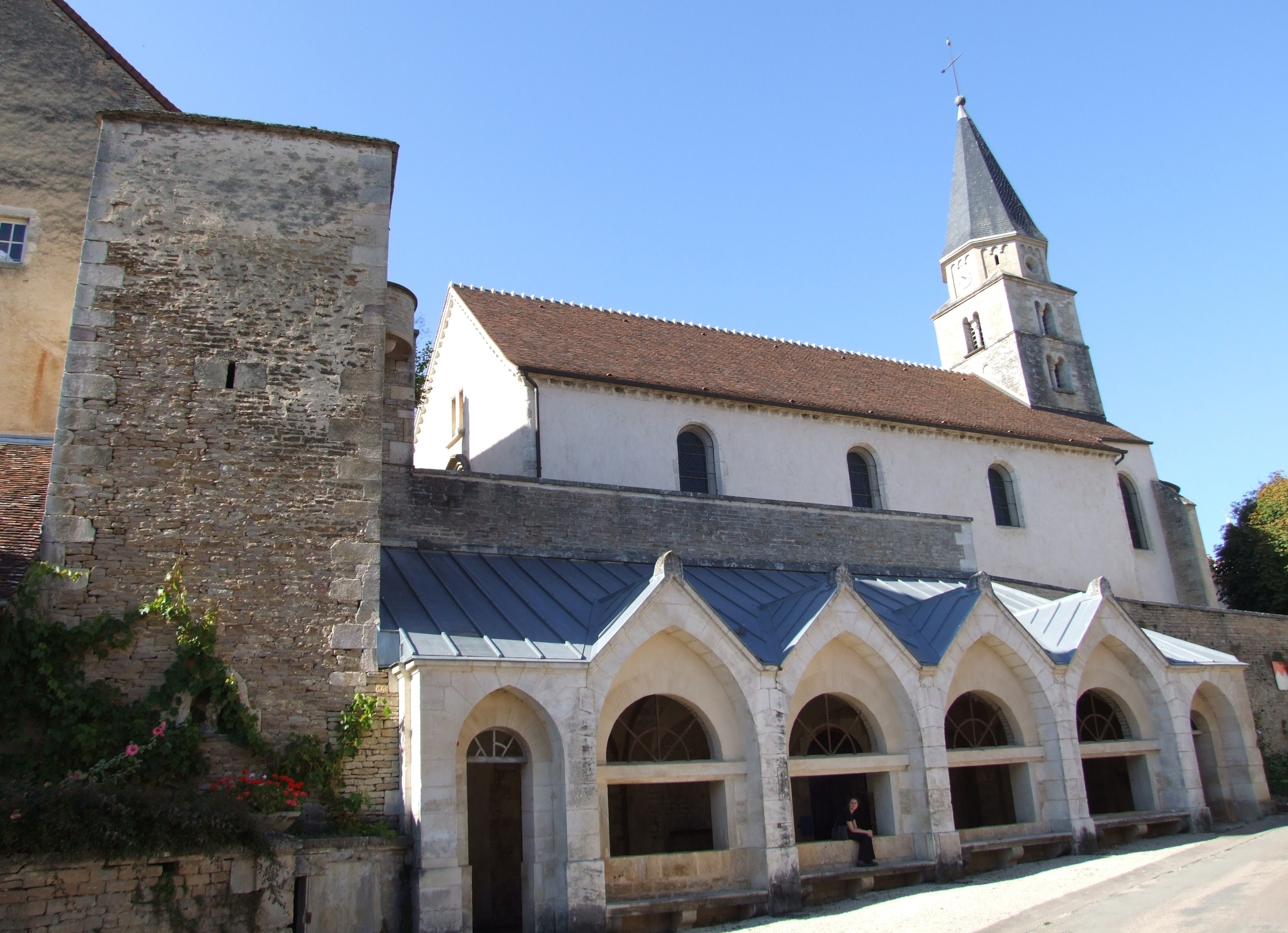
- The church and washhouse in Salives
- Location of Salives
- Location within France Location within Bourgogne-Franche-Comté
- Coordinates: 47°37′03″N 4°55′11″E
- Country: France
- Region: Bourgogne-Franche-Comté
- Department: Côte-d'Or
- Arrondissement: Dijon
- Canton: Is-sur-Tille

Government
  - Mayor (2020–2026): Charles Schneider
- Area^{1}: 47.85 km^{2} (18.47 sq mi)
- Elevation: 400 m (1,300 ft)
- Highest elevation: 527 m (1,729 ft)
- Lowest elevation: 343 m (1,125 ft)
- Population (2023): 186
  - Density: 3.89/km^{2} (10.1/sq mi)
- Time zone: UTC+01:00 (CET)
  - Summer (DST): UTC+02:00 (CEST)
- INSEE/Postal code: 21579 /21580
- ^{1} French Land Register data, which excludes lakes, ponds, glaciers > 1 km^{2} (0.386 sq mi or 247 acres) and river estuaries.

Salives (French pronunciation: [saliv]) is a commune in the Côte-d'Or department in eastern France.

== Population ==
Historical population
Year	Pop.	±% p.a.
1968	346	—
1975	286	−2.68%
1982	229	−3.13%
1990	180	−2.96%
1999	232	+2.86%
2007	263	+1.58%
2012	247	−1.25%
2017	206	−3.57%
2023	186	−1.69%
Source: INSEE

== See also ==
- Communes of the Côte-d'Or department
