= Canton of Dijon-4 =

Coordinates: 47.31°N 5.06°E

The canton of Dijon-4 is an administrative division of the Côte-d'Or department, eastern France. Its borders were modified at the French canton reorganisation which came into effect in March 2015. Its seat is in Dijon.

It consists of the following communes:

1. Dijon (partly)
