= Côte-d'Or =

Department of France in Bourgogne-Franche-Comté

- Department of France
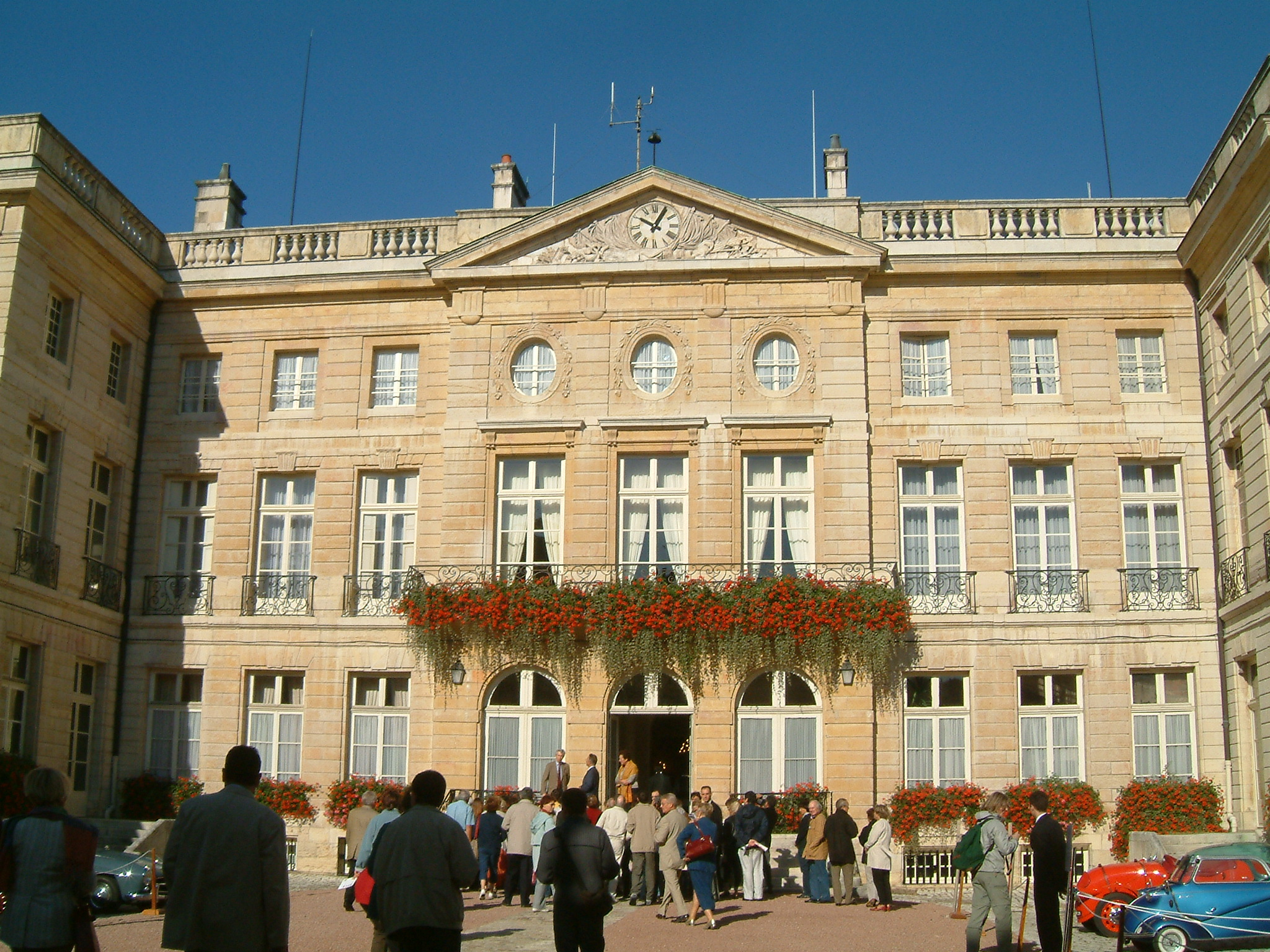
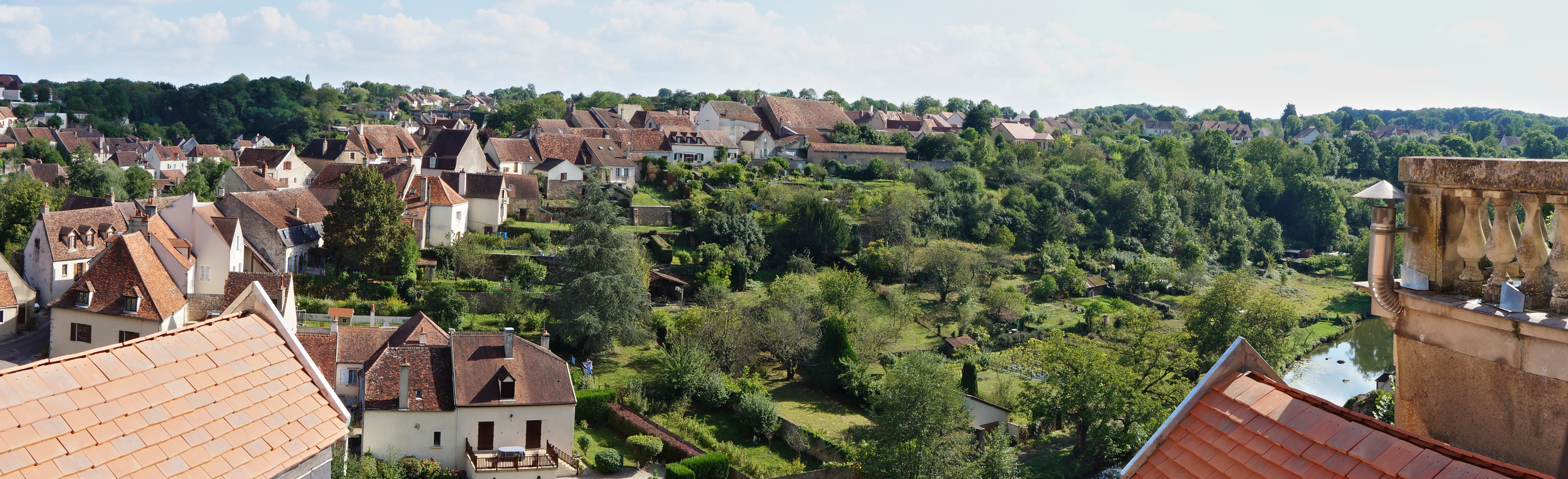
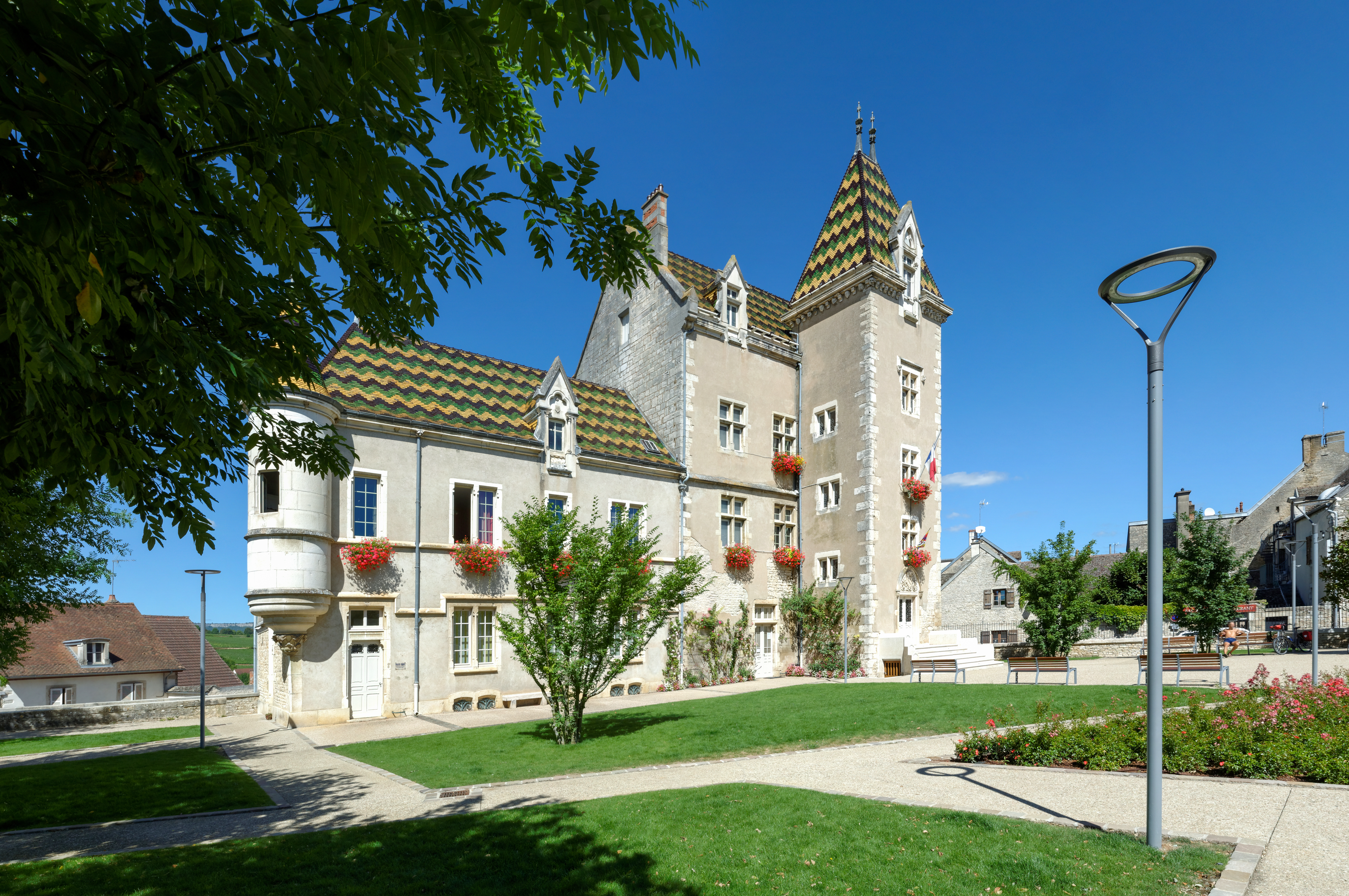
- Top down: prefecture building in Dijon, view of Semur-en-Auxois and Meursault Town Hall

- Flag Coat of arms

- Location of Côte-d'Or in France
- Coordinates: 47°25′N 04°50′E
- Country: France
- Region: Bourgogne-Franche-Comté
- Prefecture: Dijon
- Subprefectures: Beaune; Montbard

Government
  - President of the Departmental Council: François Sauvadet (UDI)

Area^{1}
  - Total: 8,763 km^{2} (3,383 sq mi)
- Highest elevation: 723 m (2,372 ft)

Population (2023)
  - Total: 540,100
  - Rank: 50th
  - Density: 61.63/km^{2} (159.6/sq mi)
- Demonyms: côte-d'oriens, costaloriens
- Time zone: UTC+1 (CET)
  - Summer (DST): UTC+2 (CEST)
- ISO 3166 code: FR-21
- Department number: 21
- Arrondissements: 3
- Cantons: 23
- Communes: 698
- ^1 French Land Register data, which exclude estuaries and lakes, ponds and glaciers larger than 1 km^{2}

Côte-d'Or (French pronunciation: [kot dɔʁ]) is a department in the Bourgogne-Franche-Comté region in France. In 2023, it had a population of 540,100. Its prefecture is Dijon, which is also the regional prefecture; its subprefectures are Beaune and Montbard.

== History ==
Côte-d'Or is one of the original 83 departments created during the French Revolution on 4 March 1790. Formed from part of the former province of Burgundy, it is arguably unique among the departments in having a name that is poetic rather than geographic. The name was first proposed by the representative of Dijon (fr:Charles-André-Rémy Arnoult), and is said to refer to the autumn gold of the flanks of the hills in wine-growing areas. The literal meaning of côte d'or in French is "golden hill".

== Geography ==
The department is part of the current region of Bourgogne-Franche-Comté. It is surrounded by the departments of Yonne, Nièvre, Saône-et-Loire, Jura, Aube, Haute-Saône, and Haute-Marne.

A chain of hills called the Plateau de Langres runs from north-east to south-west through the department to the north of Dijon and continues south-westwards as the Côte d'Or escarpment, from which the department takes its name. It is the south-east facing slope of this escarpment which is the site of the celebrated Burgundy vineyards. To the west of the Plateau de Langres, towards Champagne, lies the densely wooded district of Châtillonais. To the south-east of the plateau and escarpment, the department lies in the broad, flat-bottomed valley of the middle course of the Saône.

Rivers include:

- The Saône
- The Seine rises in the southern end of the Plateau de Langres.
- The Ouche rises on the dip slope of the escarpment and flows to the Saône via Dijon.
- The Armançon rises on the dip slope of the escarpment and flows north-westward.
- The Arroux rises on the dip slope of the escarpment at the southern end of the department.

=== Climate ===
The climate of the department is continental, with abundant rain on the west side of the central range.

=== Principal towns ===
The most populous commune is Dijon, the prefecture. As of 2023, there are 5 communes with more than 10,000 inhabitants:

Commune	Population (2023)
Dijon	161,830
Beaune	20,352
Chenôve	14,244
Talant	11,896
Chevigny-Saint-Sauveur	11,108

== Demographics ==
The inhabitants of the department are called Costaloriens in French.

Population development since 1791:

Historical population

Year	Pop.	±% p.a.
1791	342,986	—
1801	340,500	−0.07%
1806	355,436	+0.86%
1821	358,148	+0.05%
1831	375,063	+0.46%
1841	393,316	+0.48%
1851	400,297	+0.18%
1861	384,140	−0.41%
1872	374,510	−0.23%
1881	382,819	+0.24%
1891	376,866	−0.16%
1901	361,626	−0.41%
1911	350,044	−0.32%
1921	321,088	−0.86%

Year	Pop.	±% p.a.
1931	333,800	+0.39%
1936	334,386	+0.04%
1946	335,602	+0.04%
1954	356,839	+0.77%
1962	387,869	+1.05%
1968	421,192	+1.38%
1975	456,070	+1.14%
1982	473,548	+0.54%
1990	493,866	+0.53%
1999	506,755	+0.29%
2007	519,143	+0.30%
2012	527,403	+0.32%
2017	533,819	+0.24%
2023	540,100	+0.20%

== Politics ==
The President of the Departmental Council is François Sauvadet of the Union of Democrats and Independents.

Party		seats
	Socialist Party	12
•	Union for a Popular Movement	11
•	Miscellaneous Right	8
	Miscellaneous Left	6
	Left Radical Party	3
•	New Centre	2
•	MoDem	1

=== Current National Assembly Representatives ===
Constituency	Member	Party
Côte-d'Or's 1st constituency	Océane Godard	Socialist Party
Côte-d'Or's 2nd constituency	Catherine Hervieu	The Ecologists
Côte-d'Or's 3rd constituency	Pierre Pribetich	Socialist Party
Côte-d'Or's 4th constituency	Hubert Brigand	The Republicans
Côte-d'Or's 5th constituency	René Lioret	National Rally

== Economy ==
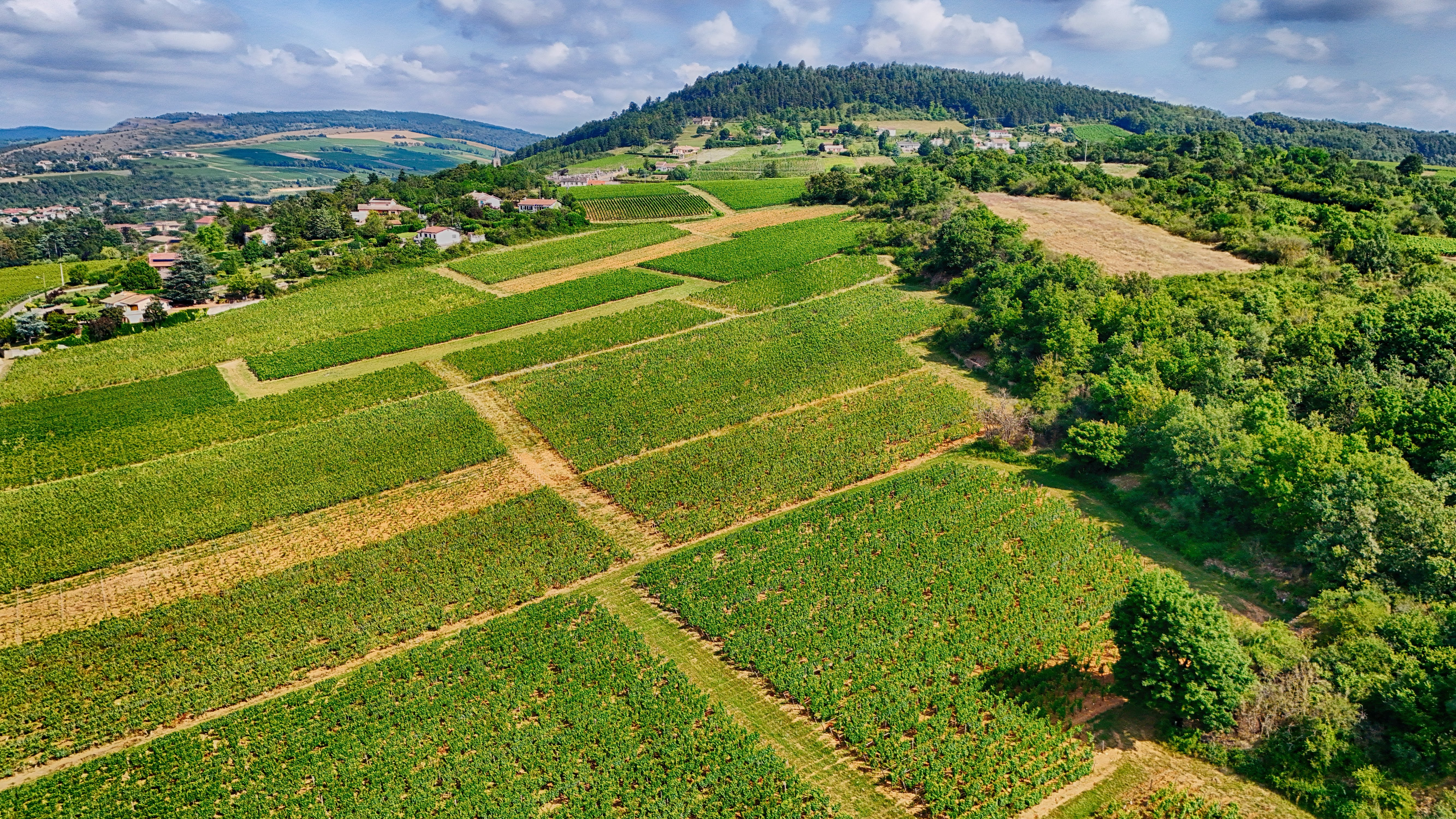
Vineyards on rolling hills in the Burgundy region of eastern France

This is a wine-growing region of France. It produces the most expensive Pinot noir and Chardonnay wines from some of the most classified vineyards in the world. Wine from the Côte-d'Or was a favorite of the emperor Charlemagne. Other crops include cereal grains and potatoes. Sheep and cattle are also raised in the department. The region is famous for Dijon mustard.

There are coal mines and heavy industry, including steel, machinery, and earthenware. The industries most developed in Côte-d'Or are

- agriculture and food (14% of employees)
- metallurgy and metal manufacture (12% of employees)
- chemicals, rubber and plastics (12% of employees)
- pharmacy
- electrical and electronic components and equipment
- wood and paper industries.

The big works are generally in the conurbation of Dijon although the biggest (CEA Valduc) is at Salives in the Plateau de Langres. There is also the SEB metal works at Selongey below the plateau on the margin of the Saône plain and the Valourec metalworking group at Montbard in the west of the department on the River Brenne near its confluence with the Armançon. The Pharmaceutical industry has shown the greatest growth in recent years. However, since the Dijon employment statistics zone includes the urban and administrative centre of the Burgundy region, the service sector is proportionately bigger there in relation to the industrial, than in the other three zones of Côte-d'Or.

- Reference Industry in Bourgogne website

== Transport ==
=== Air ===
Côte-d'Or is served by Dole–Jura Airport which is located 51 km (32 mi) south east of Dijon. However, the airport only provides flights to limited European destinations. Residents in Côte-d'Or would normally use Lyon-Saint Exupéry Airport, Geneva Airport and EuroAirport Basel Mulhouse Freiburg which provide more domestic and international destinations.

== Tourism ==
Some of the major tourist attractions are the Gothic abbey church of Saint-Seine-l'Abbaye and the 11th-century Romanesque abbey church at Saulieu, as well the 12th-century Château de Bussy Rabutin at Bussy-le-Grand. The Abbey of Cîteaux, headquarters of the Cistercian Order, lies to the east of Nuits-Saint-Georges in the south of the department.

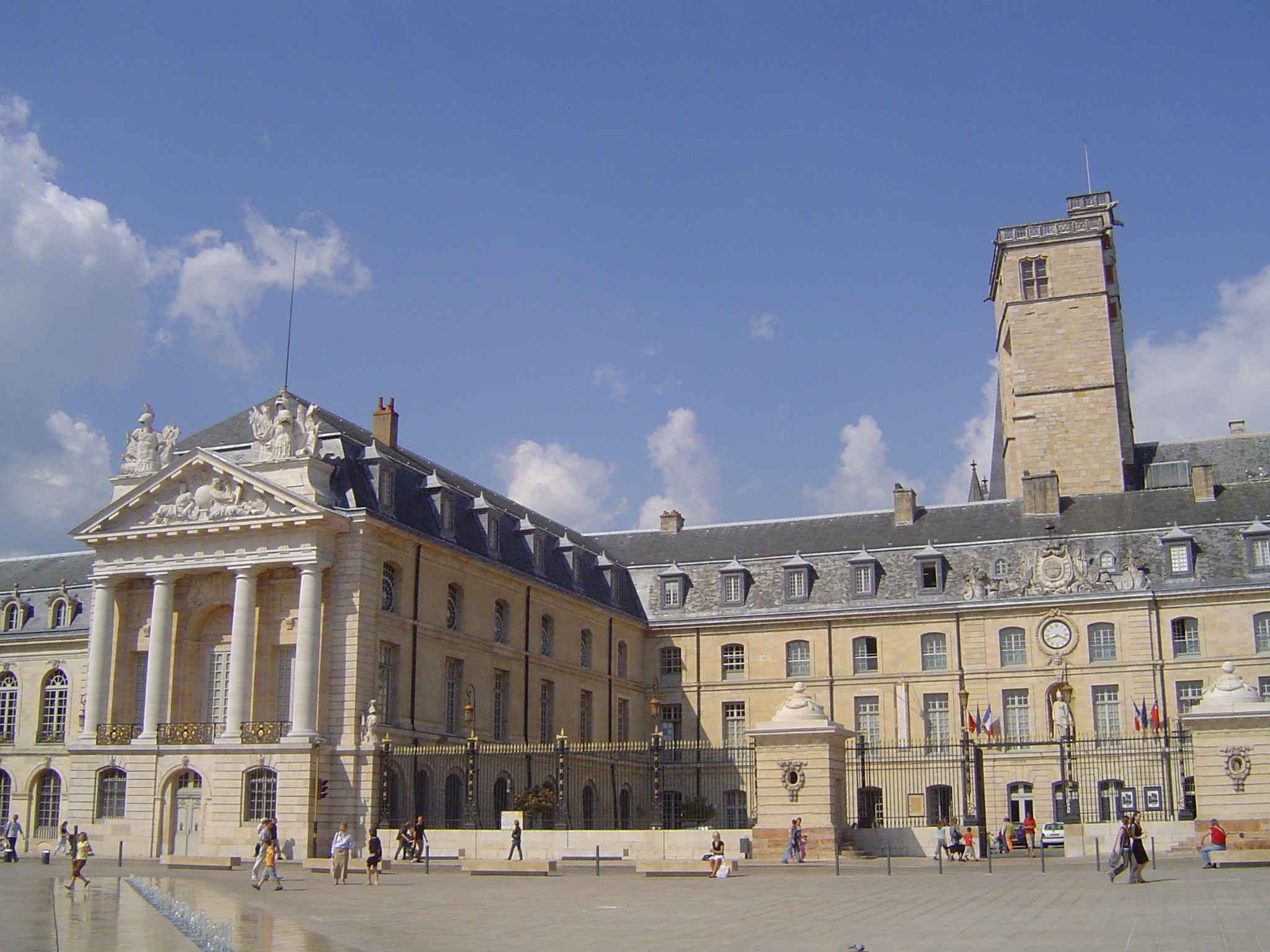
Palace of the Dukes of Burgundy in Dijon

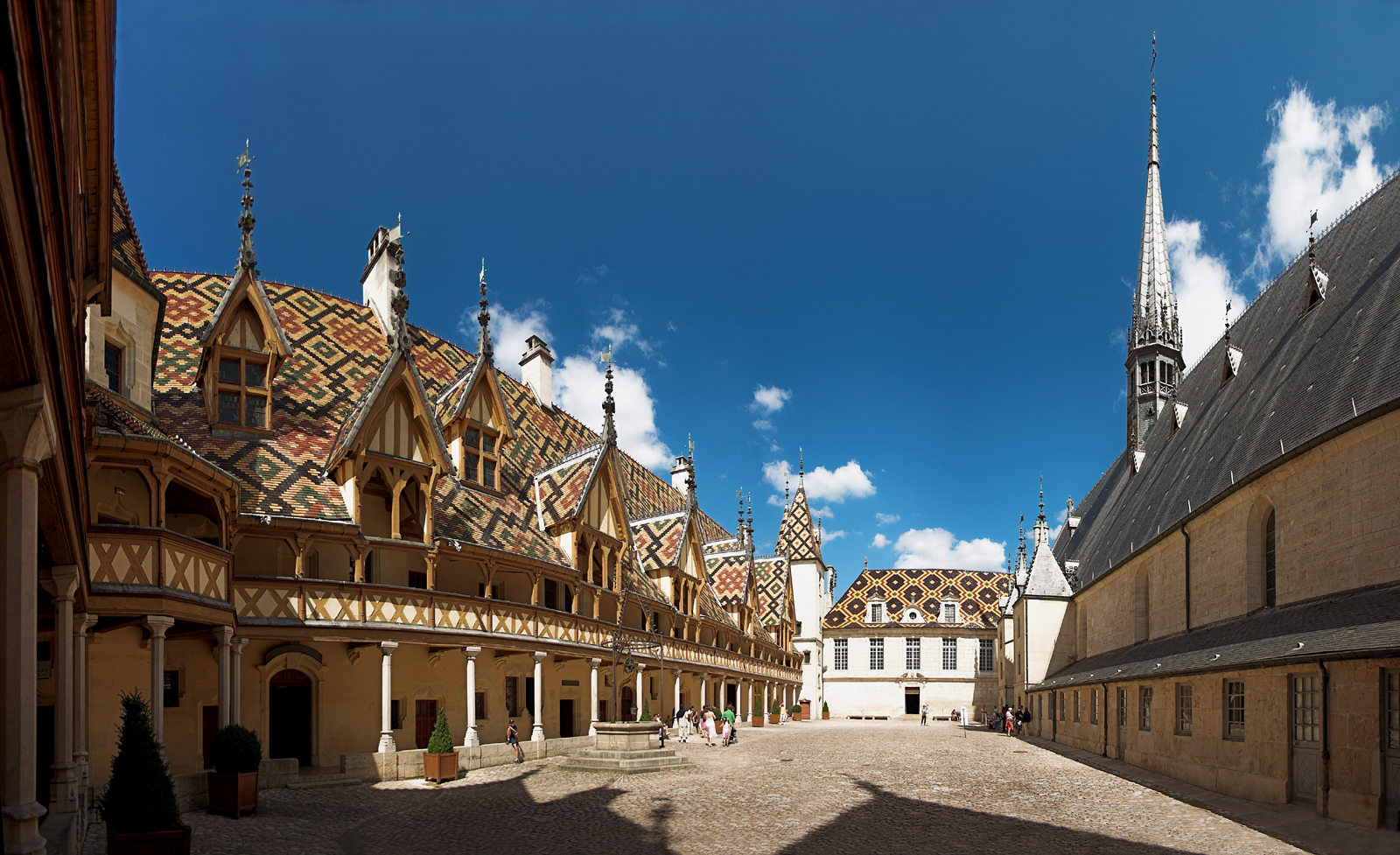
Hospices de Beaune

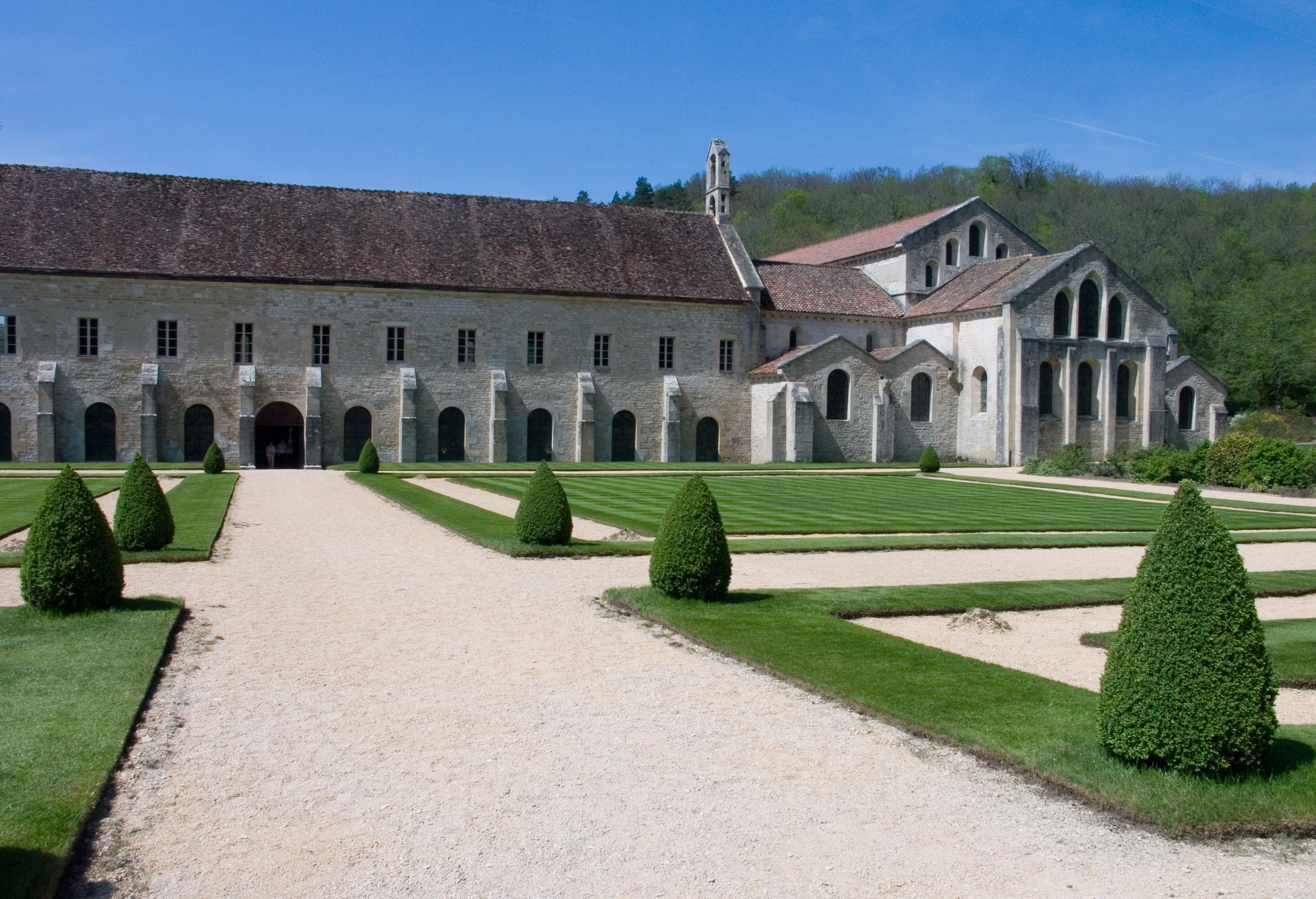
Abbey of Fontenay

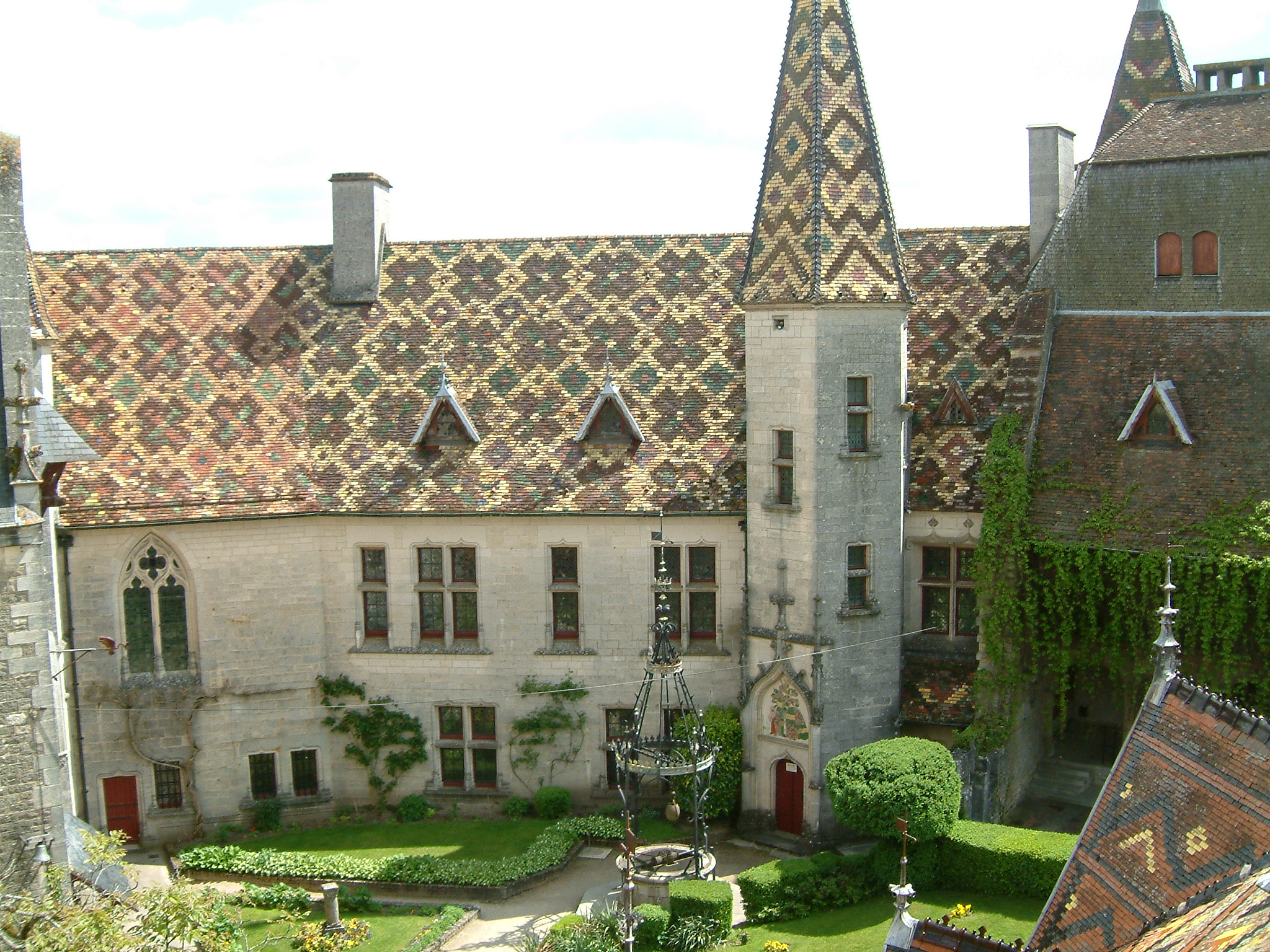
Château de la Rochepot

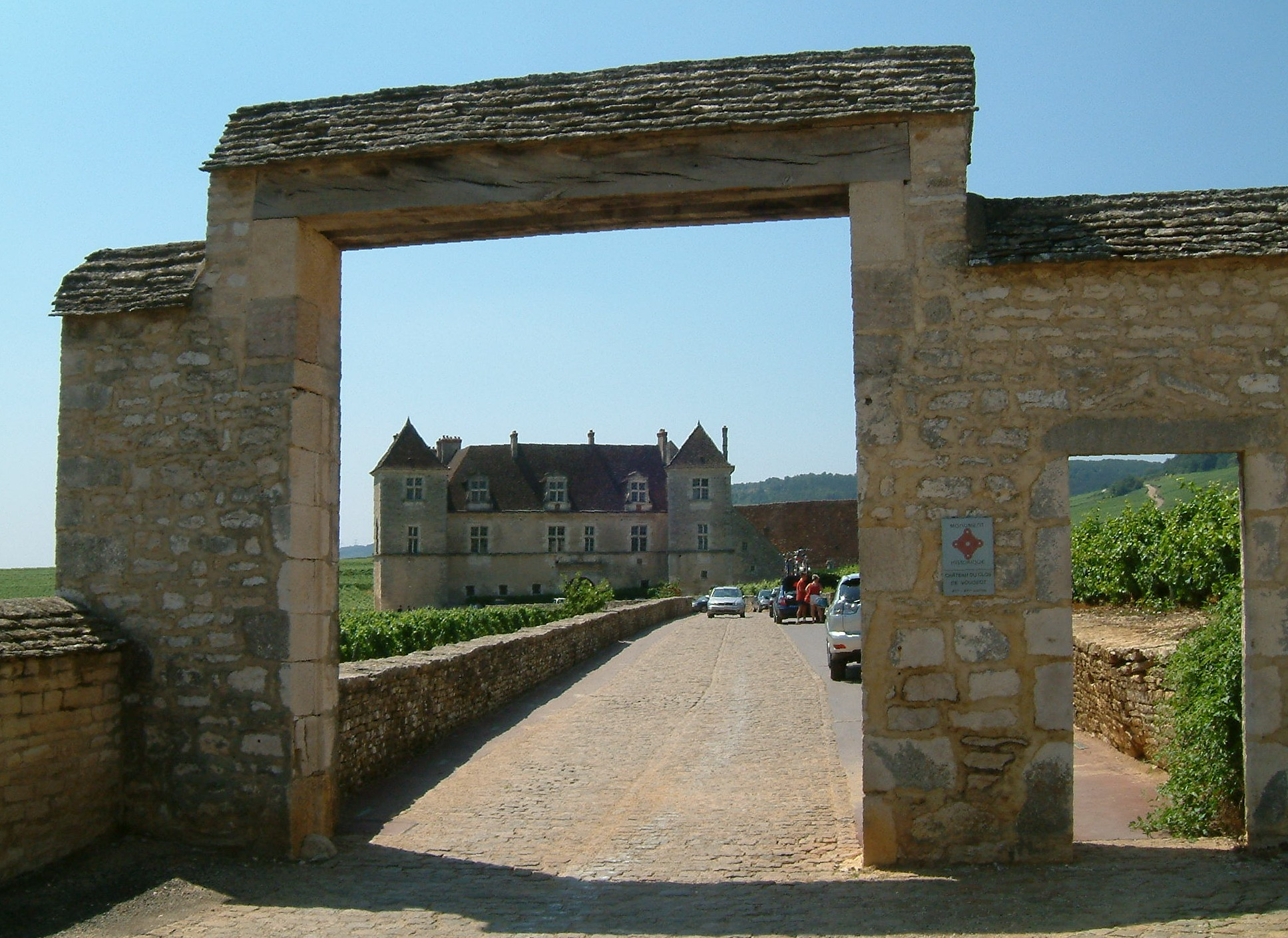
Clos de Vougeot, Burgundy wine

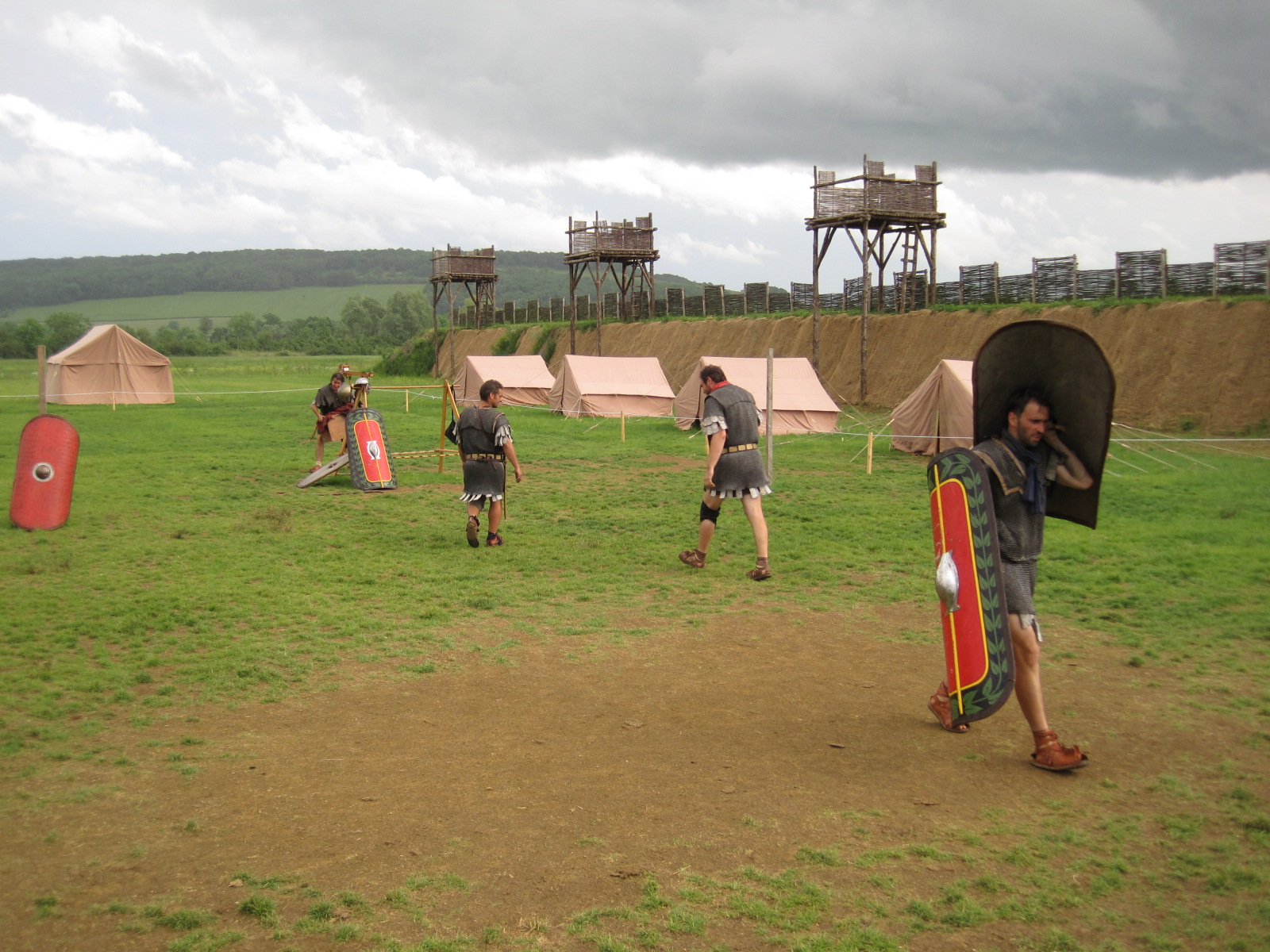
Reenactment of the siege of Alesia in Alise-Sainte-Reine

== See also ==
- French wine
- Cantons of the Côte-d'Or department
- Communes of the Côte-d'Or department
- Arrondissements of the Côte-d'Or department
- Pont-d'Ouche
- Sincey coal mines
