= Jean de la Huerta =

Spanish sculptor of Aragonese origin

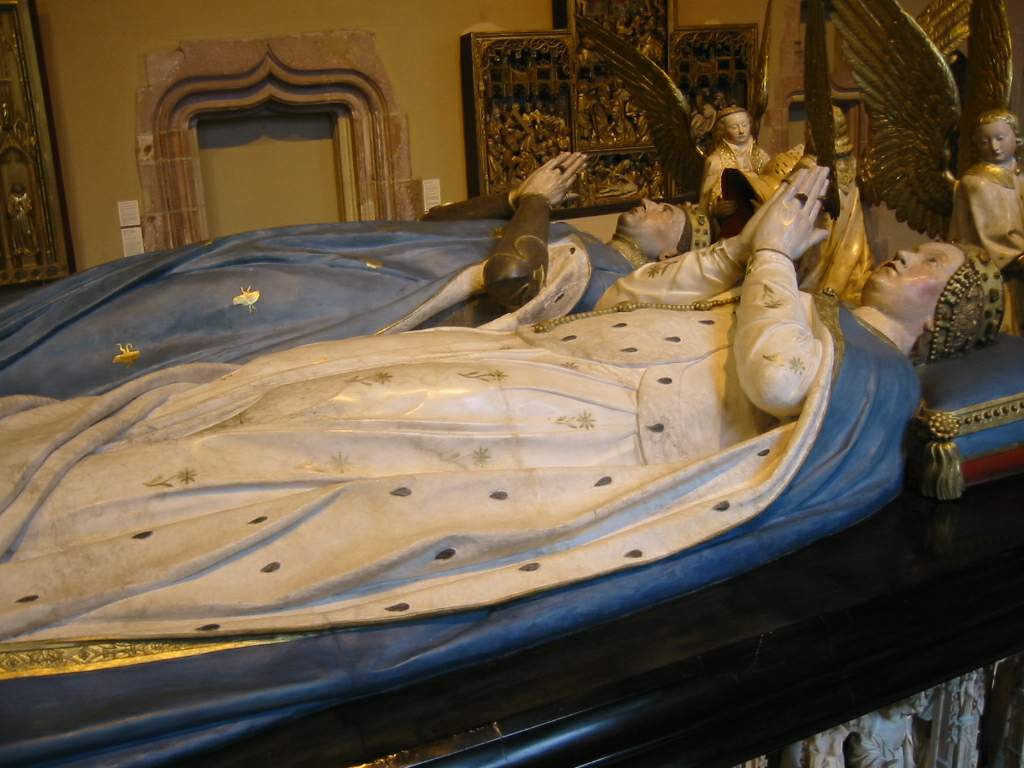
Tomb of Duke John the Fearless and Margaret of Bavaria by Jean de la Huerta and Antoine Le Moiturier, Palace of the Dukes of Burgundy

Jean de la Huerta (1413 in Daroca – 1462 in Maçon) was a Spanish sculptor of Aragonese origin. Most of his work was produced in the duchy of Burgundy.

De la Huerta remained relatively unknown until the end of the 20th century, uncovered by the research of the Musée des Beaux-Arts de Dijon in 1972. In collaboration with Antoine Le Moiturier, he sculpted the tombs for Duke John the Fearless and Margaret of Bavaria, which currently reside at the Palace of the Dukes of Burgundy. The job was originally assigned to the workshop of Claus Sluter, but went to Le Moiturier and De la Huerta.

There is a work by this sculptor in the Cleveland Museum of Art, Cleveland, Ohio, ("Mourner from Tomb of John the Fearless and Margaret of Bavaria" alabaster)

== Sources ==
- Jean de la Huerta and Burgundian sculpture in the middle of the fifteenth century, dir. P. QuarrÃ, exhibition at the Museum of Dijon, Palace of the Dukes of Burgundy, Dijon, 1972.
- Jacques Baudoin, Large imagiers West, Nonet, Ed. Create, 1983, 264 p. (Part V, p. 172–181)
- Jacques Baudoin, Flaming sculpture in Burgundy - Franche-Comté, Nonet, Ed. Create, 1996.
- Peter Camp, Growlers imaging of the late Middle Ages, "Cahiers du-old Dijon," No. 17-18, 1990, p. 118–141.
