= Antoine Le Moiturier =

French sculptor

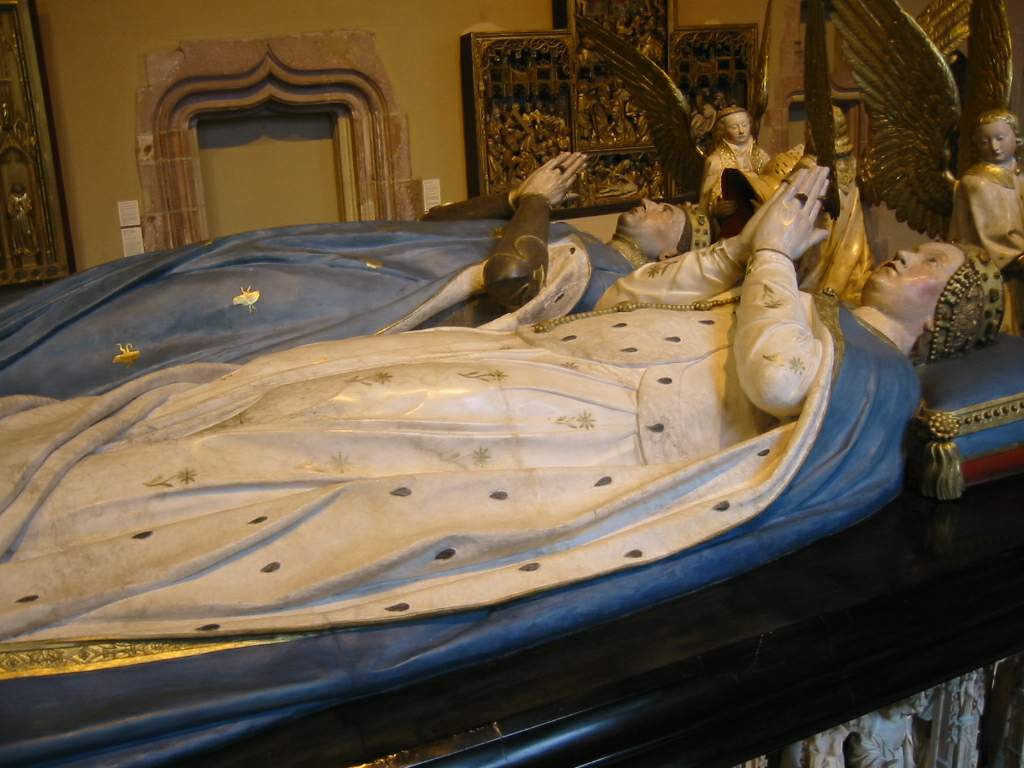
Tomb of Duke John the Fearless and Margaret of Bavaria by Antoine Le Moiturier, Palace of the Dukes of Burgundy

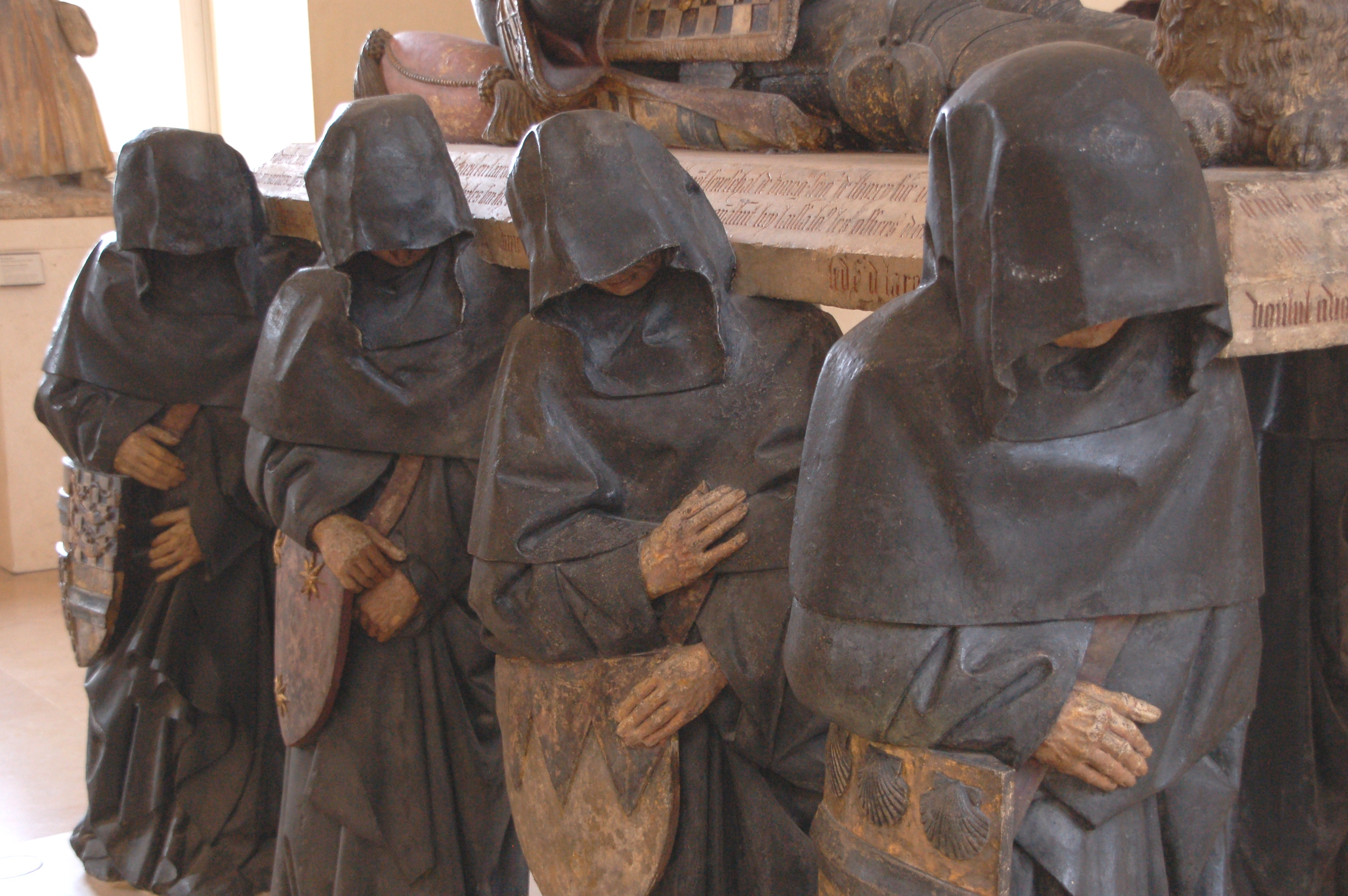
Pleurants, circa 1480, attributed to Le Moiturier on the tomb of Philippe Pot, now located in the Louvre

Antoine Le Moiturier (1425–1495) was a French sculptor. He was born in Avignon into a family of sculptors. His uncle was the itinerant French master Jacques Morel.

Following from the work of Jean de la Huerta beginning in 1443, Le Moiturier completed a group of sculptures of Pleurants known as the Mourners of Dijon. Completed in 1470, these sculptures are in the architectural frieze on the tombs of Duke John the Fearless and Margaret of Bavaria. They reside at the Palace of the Dukes of Burgundy in Dijon. The job had originally been assigned to the workshop of Claus Sluter, but went to Le Moiturier and De la Huerta.

In 1461, le Moiturier was hired by Canon Jacques Oboli to create an altarpiece for St Pierre, Avignon. Oboli died before the work could be completed, and in 1463 the church commissioned an altarpiece depicting the Last Judgement. le Moiturier completed this two years later. This stellar work included statues of Jesus, Saint Peter and Paul, and several angels. Today, only two sculptures remain of the more than sixteen that were originally in the sculpture.

Le Moiturier is believed to have made the pleurants on the tomb of Philippe Pot (1477–83).
