= Japanese Girl Bathing =

Painting by James Tissot

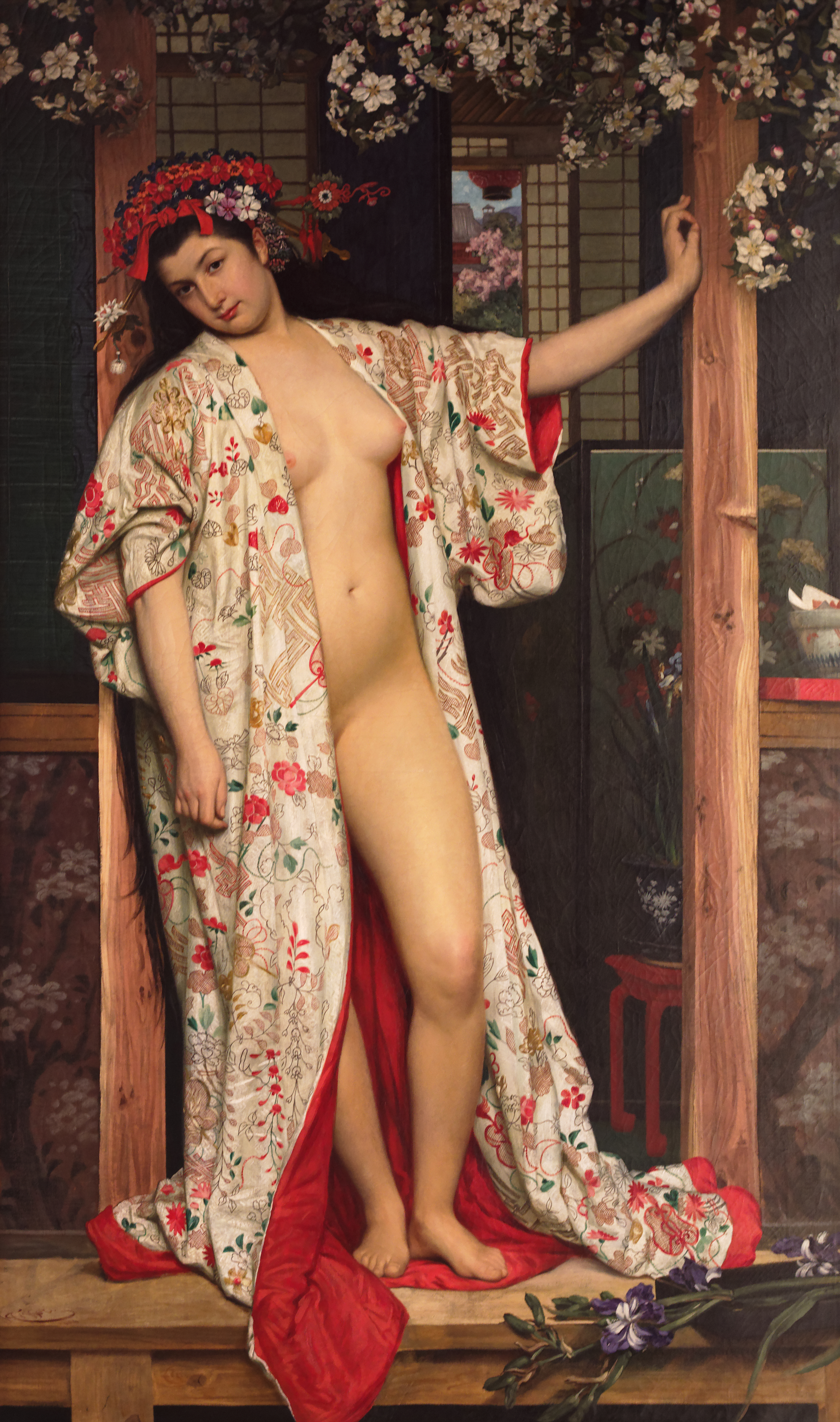
- Artist: James Tissot
- Year: 1864
- Type: Oil on canvas, genre painting
- Dimensions: 208 cm × 124 cm (82 in × 49 in)
- Location: Musée des Beaux-Arts, Dijon

Japanese Girl Bathing (French: La Japonaise au bain) is an oil painting on canvas by the French artist James Tissot, from 1864. It features a young Japanese nude woman bathing. The work was part of the nineteenth century tradition of orientalism. Tissot, who never visited Japan, painted a French model in his Parisian studio draped in a kimono. However, she wears it more like a European bathrobe. The theme of Japanese objects is a recurring theme in his work of this period.

Today the painting is in the collection of the Musée des Beaux-Arts de Dijon, having been acquired in 1913.

== See also ==
- Japonisme

== Bibliography ==
- Marshall, Nancy Rose & Warner, Malcolm. James Tissot: Victorian Life, Modern Love. Yale University Press, 1999.
- Yamaguchi, Arisa. Sartorial Japonisme and the Experience of Kimonos in Britain, 1865–1914. Taylor & Francis, 2023.
