= Assumption of the Virgin (Veronese) =

1580 oil on canvas by Paolo Veronese

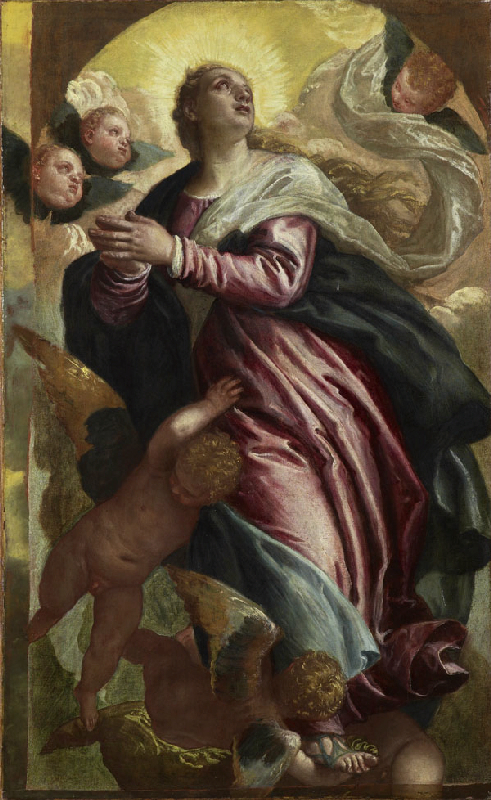

Assumption of the Virgin is a 1580 oil on canvas painting by Paolo Veronese. Since 1803 it has been in the Musée des Beaux-Arts de Dijon and it was transferred from the French state to the city of Dijon in 2010.
