= Jacques Morel (artist) =

French sculptor

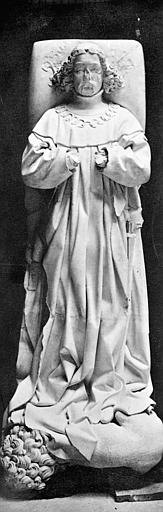
Recumbent figure of Charles I, Duke of Bourbon by Jacques Morel, abbey church of Souvigny

Jacques Morel (French pronunciation: [ʒak mɔʁɛl]; 1395–1459) was a French sculptor.

Morel was a widely traveled and prolific artist, and head of the Morel family of artists. His nephew was Antoine Le Moiturier. He was named Master of the Works of Lyon Cathedral in 1418 and was contracted to execute an elaborate tomb for a cardinal there in 1420 (destroyed 1562).

After leaving Lyon in 1424 or 1425, Morel worked in the Rhone valley and elsewhere in southern and central France. He is cited as an inhabitant of Toulouse in a commission for a silver altarpiece for Avignon Cathedral (1429; apparently never completed), as active in Béziers (1433; work for Saint Aphrodise, and as collaborator of Simon de Beaujeu in Tarascon (c. 1433). This was followed by periods of residence in Avignon (1441-5), Montpellier (1445-8) and Rodez, where in 1448 he received a contract for the construction and sculptural decoration of the south portal of the cathedral (work left incomplete in 1456).

In 1448 he was commissioned to carve the alabaster tomb of Charles I, Duke of Bourbon (d 1456), and his wife Agnes of Burgundy, Duchess of Bourbon, for the Chapelle Neuve of St. Pierre, Souvigny. Completed in 1453, this is his only documented work to survive.

Morel spent his last years from 1453 in Angers, where he completed the tomb of King René of Anjou (d 1480) and his first wife Isabella, Duchess of Lorraine (d 1453), in Angers Cathedral (begun 1450 by Jean Pocet (d 1452) and his son; destroyed).
