= Musée des Beaux-Arts de Dijon =

Art museum in Dijon, France

Coordinates: 47°19′17.6″N 5°2′33.6″E

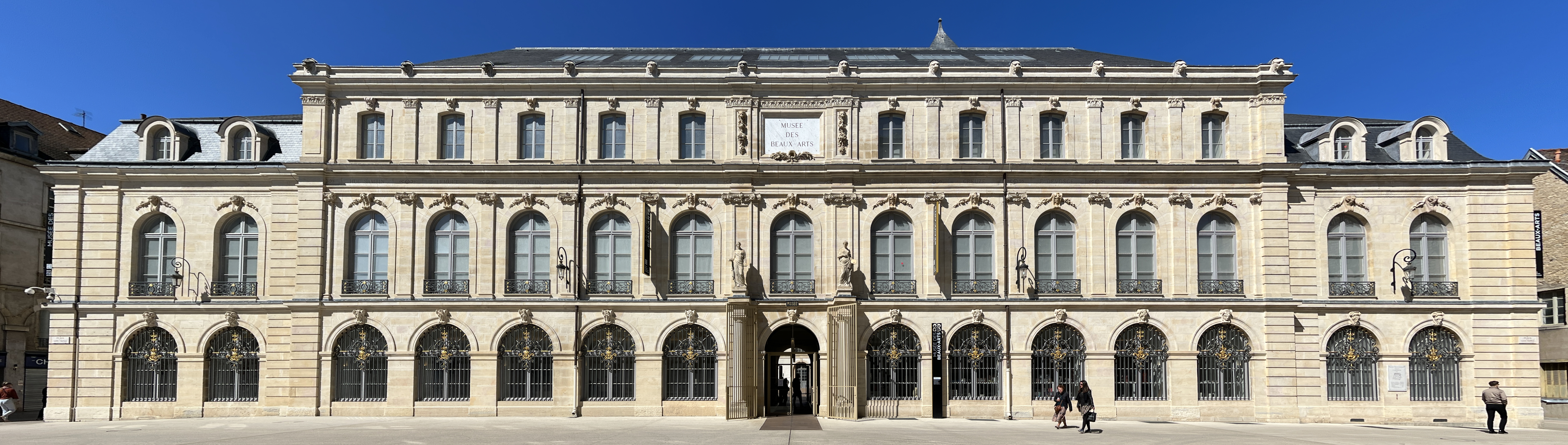
- Established: 1787
- Location: Palace of the Dukes of Burgundy; Dijon, 21000; France
- Visitors: 262 654 (2022)
- Director: Sophie Jugie
- Website: beaux-arts.dijon.fr

The Musée des Beaux-Arts de Dijon is a museum of fine arts opened in 1787, in Dijon, France. It is one of the main and oldest museums of France. It is located in the historic city centre of Dijon and housed in the former ducal palace which was the headquarters of the Burgundy State in the 15th century. When the duchy was assimilated to the Kingdom of France, the palace became the house of the King. In the 17th century, it became the Palace of the Dukes of Burgundy following a project by Jules Hardouin-Mansart.

Since 2006, the museum has been in a process of full renovation and extension. First, the work focused on one part including the renovated route "Middle-Ages – Renaissance", inaugurated on 7 September 2013. The fully-renovated museum displaying 1500 works of art in 50 different rooms was inaugurated on 17 May 2019 in the presence of the Minister for Culture Franck Riester, the former French President François Hollande and the Mayor François Rebsamen. Attendance soared with 230,000 visitors recorded at the end of October to reach 315,000 at the end of 2019.

== History ==
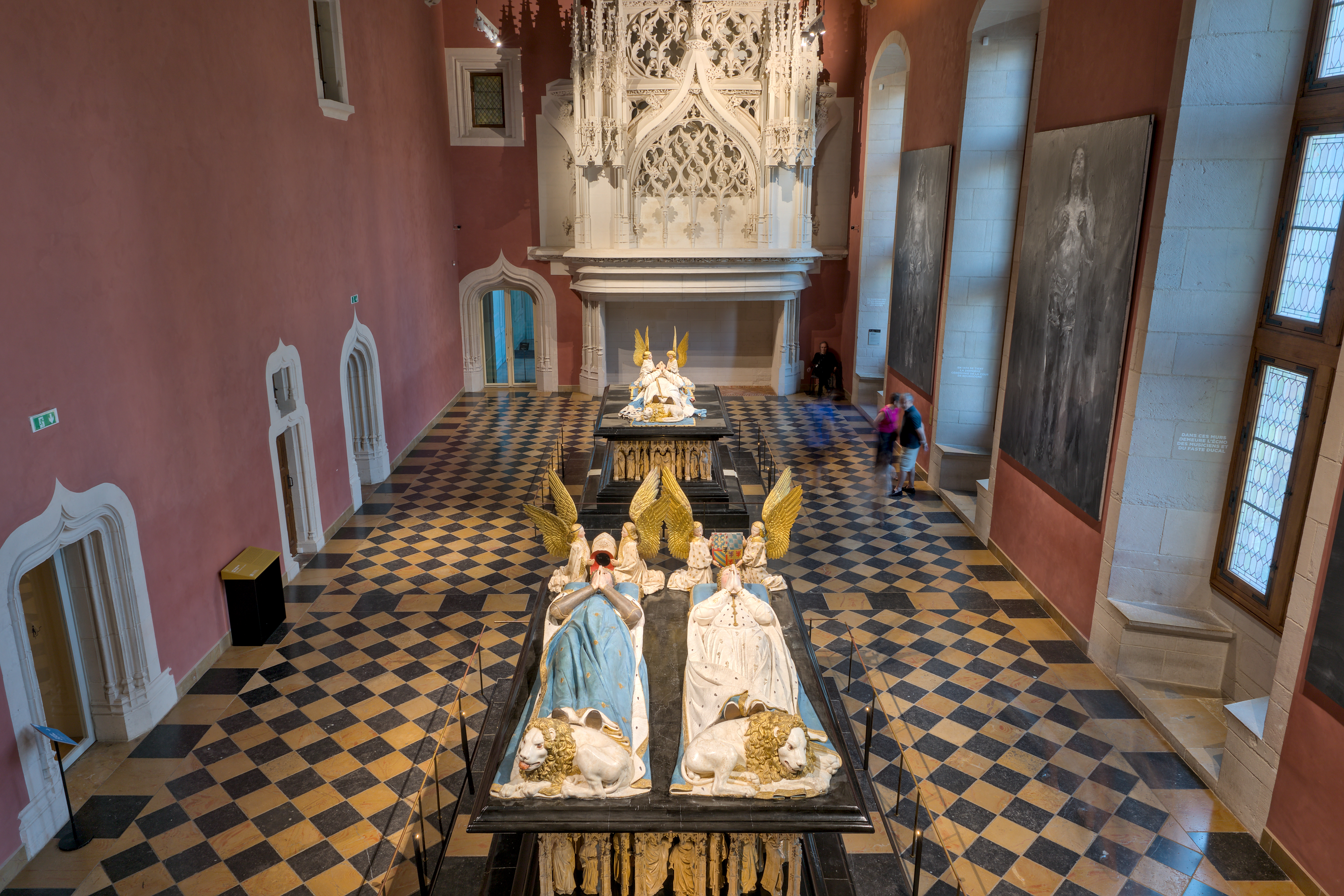
Tombs of the Dukes of Burgundy

The museum was founded during the Age of Enlightenment on the order of the Estates of Burgundy on 30 November 1787, but the project dated from 1783, with the decision to build the eastern wing of the palace. The aim was to facilitate teaching for the art school's students by gathering works that could serve as models.

This original school was free and open to everyone. It was created by François Devosge on 24 March 1767. The museum was placed under the protection of the Estates of Burgundy and presented its collections in the Salon Condé, conceived as a gallery of paintings to celebrate the glory of the Grand Condé's battles, and in the Statues Room or "Room of the Antiques" where copies of plaster and marble antiques could be found.

It is known for its collections in relation to the dukes of Burgundy, for the richness of its encyclopedic collections stretching from Egyptian art to the 20th century as well as the historical interest of the building that holds them, the Palace of the Dukes of Burgundy.

The museum was opened to the public in 1799, and gradually spread out within the palace, being enriched by imperial grants, deposits by the State, donations and legacies. As one of the largest museums in France, the Musée des Beaux-Arts de Dijon is known for its rich collections of sculptures, paintings, art objects, and other items from the past. It contains the tombs of Philippe le Hardi and Jean sans Peur, a collection of German and Swiss primitives (the most important in France) and a collection of French paintings, rich in artists dating back to the time of Louis XIV, not forgetting the collection of contemporary art.

The museum also holds extra-European collections, such as ceramic and Islamic glasses, weapons and oriental caskets, ancient ivories of Africa, everyday objects and African ceremonial masks, Chinese and Japanese porcelains, Korean stoneware, Tibetan and Indian sculptures and pre-Columbian ceramics.

== Artworks ==
The museum holds a large and varied collection of art:

- Various remains of the lavish court of the Dukes of Burgundy, including the famous tombs of Philip the Bold, John the Fearless and Margaret of Bavaria with their mourners from the Chartreuse of Champmol.
- A collection of Egyptian antiquities with a rare series of Fayum mummy portraits
- A collection of Roman art from Switzerland and Germany unique in France
- Some famous works from the Renaissance, 17th and 18th centuries, including works by Melchior Broederlam, Verrocchio, Robert Campin (known as the Master of Flémalle), Ambrogio Lorenzetti, Lorenzo Lotto, Titian, Jacopo Pontormo, Paolo Veronese (Assumption of the Virgin), Jan Brueghel the Elder, Guido Reni, Georges de La Tour, Rubens, Philippe de Champaigne, Charles Le Brun, Jean-Baptiste Greuze, Hubert Robert
- A balanced representation of different currents of 19th century, and a significant body of work of the sculptor Pompon
- A section of modern art including Granville gift: Théodore Géricault, Eugène Boudin, Claude Monet, Édouard Manet, Alfred Sisley, Georges Braque, Juan Gris, Georges Rouault
- Representative works of the school of Paris from 1950 to 1970, with Charles Lapicque, Vieira da Silva, Nicolas de Staël

=== Selected collection highlights ===
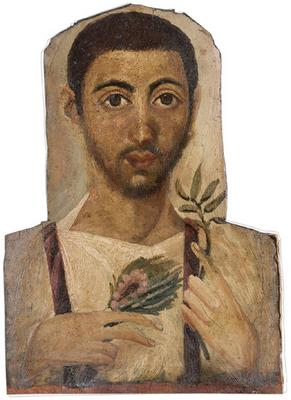
Fayum mumy portrait

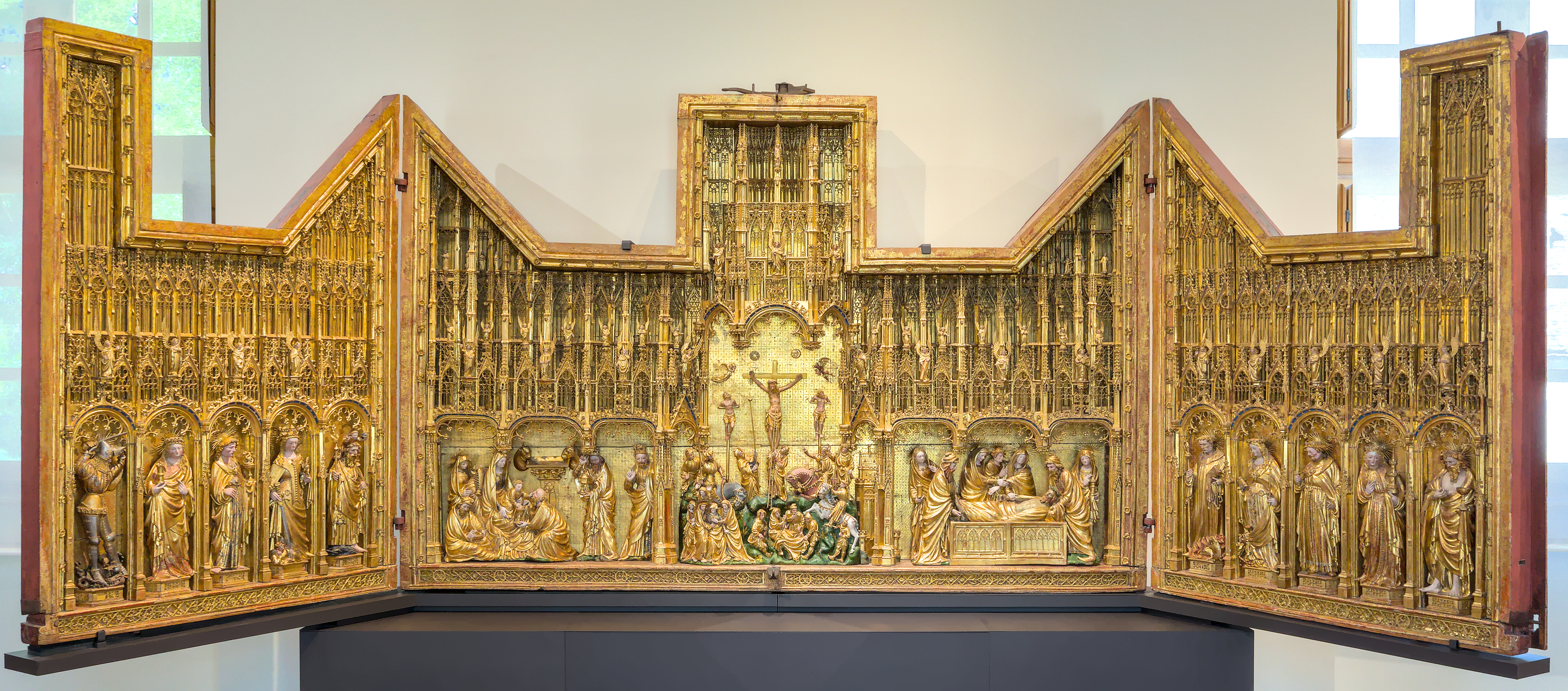
Jacques de Baerze, Altarpiece of the Crucifixion

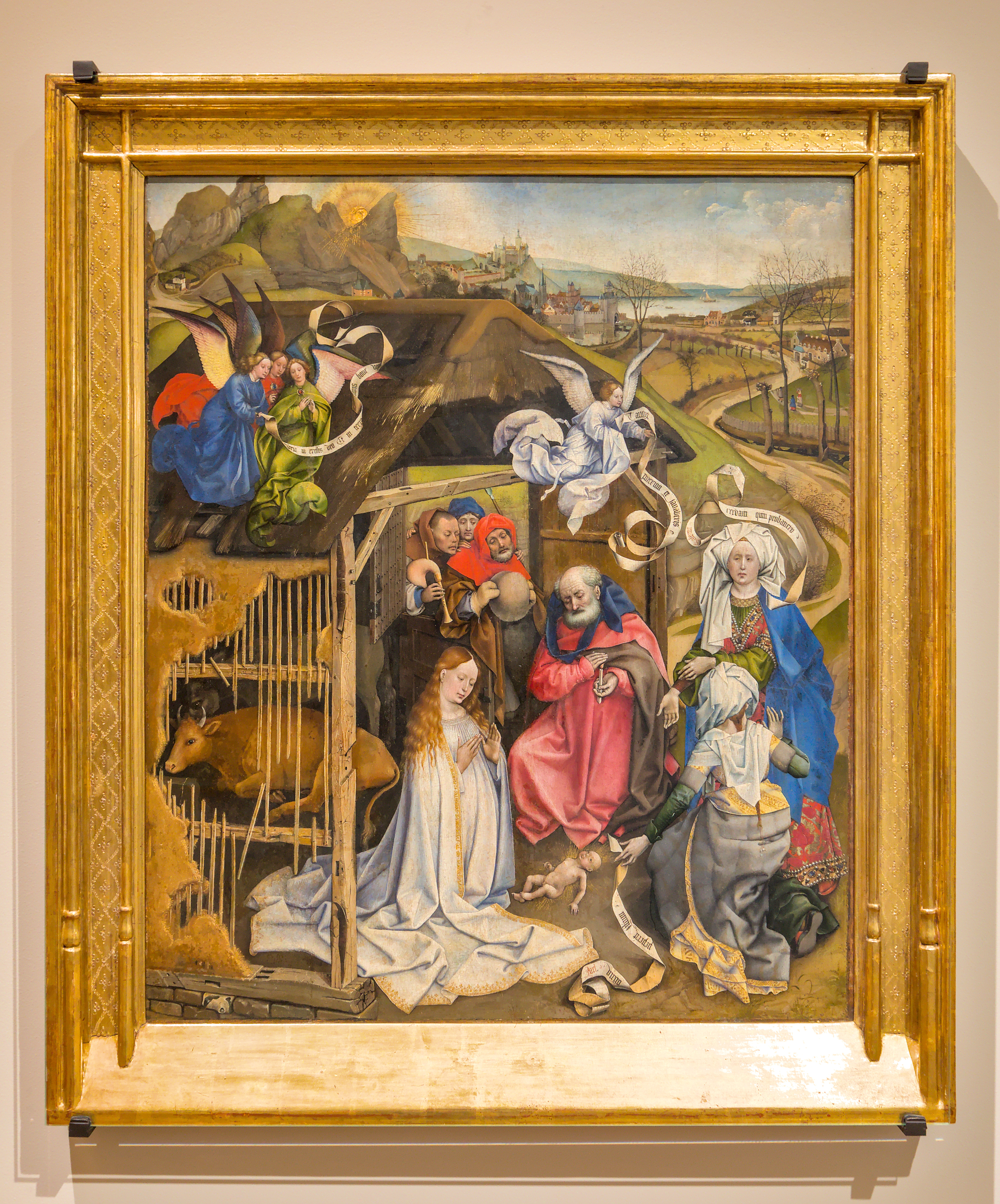
Robert Campin, Nativity and Adoration of the Shepherds

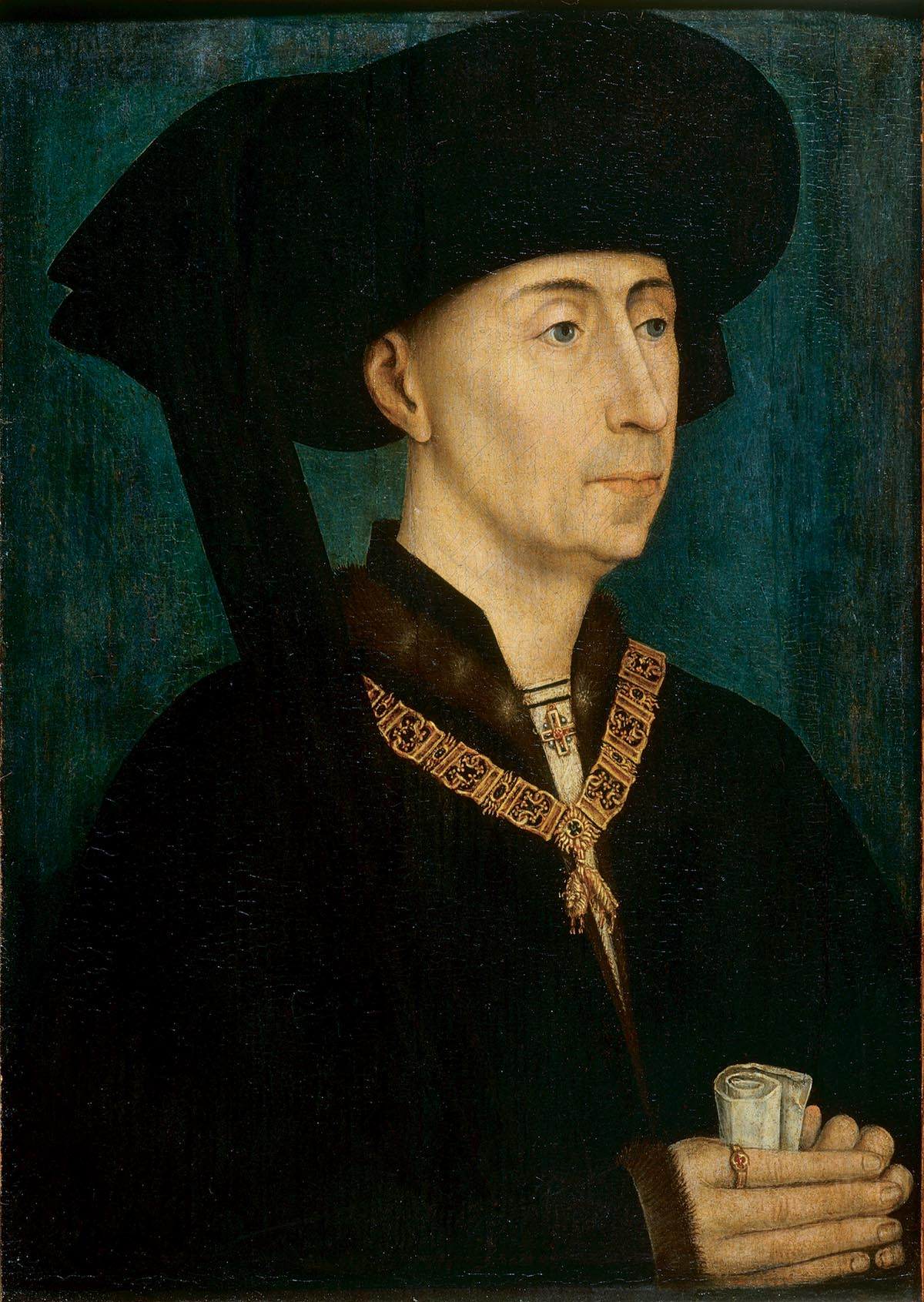
Rogier van der Weyden, Portrait of Philip the Good, 1450

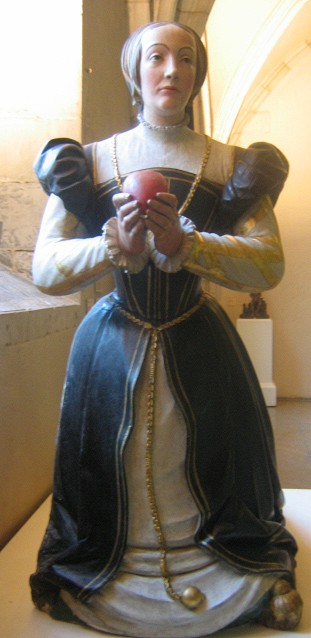
Funerary monument of Antoinette de Fontette, 16th century

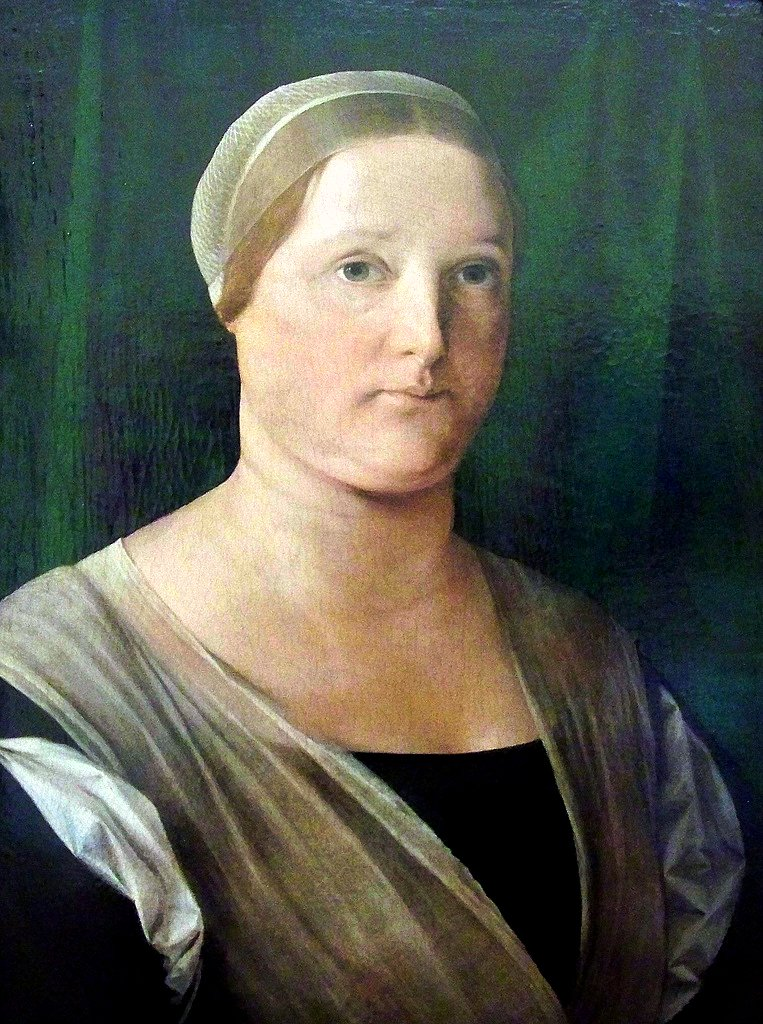
Lorenzo Lotto, Portrait of a Woman, c. 1505

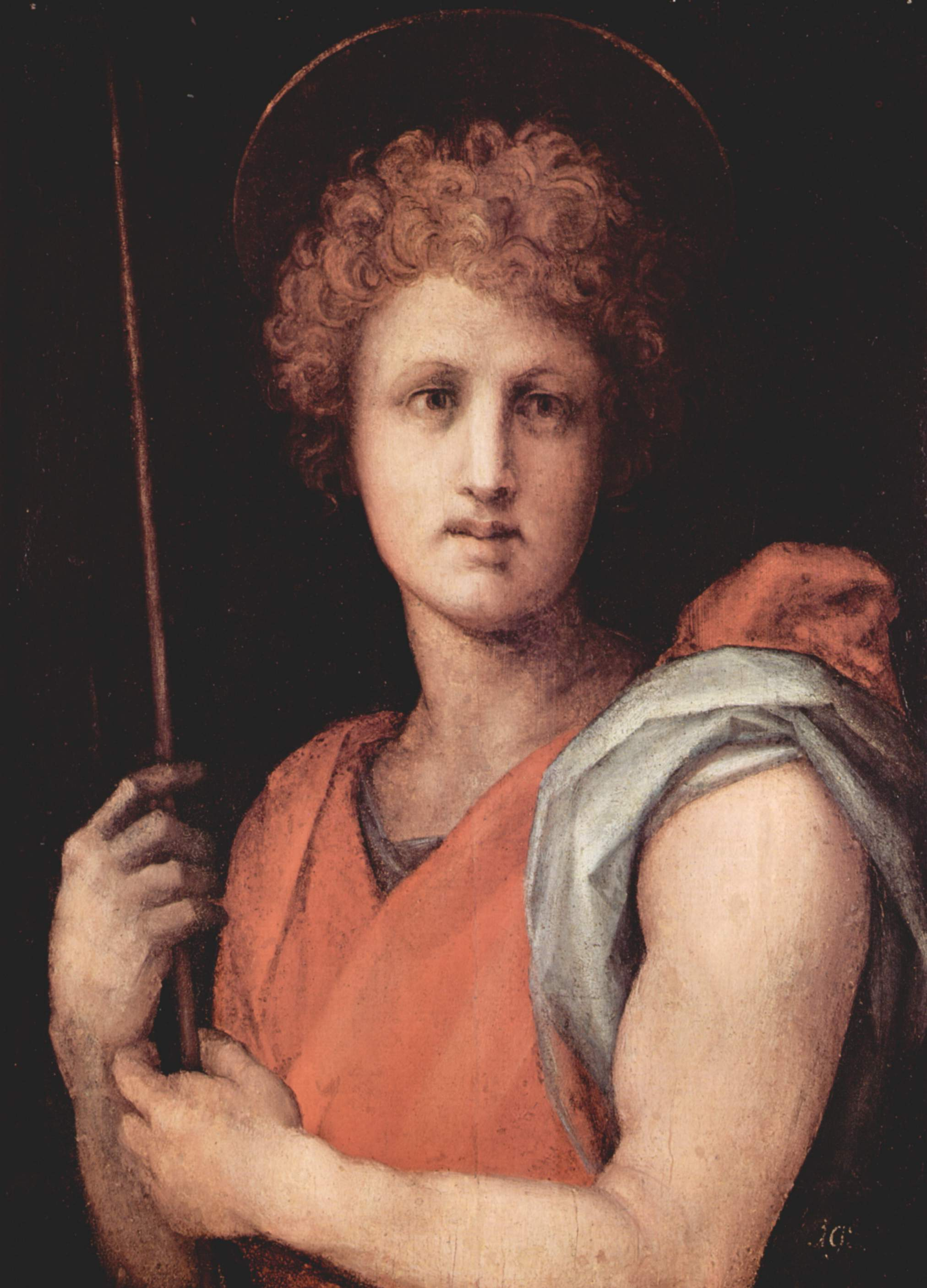
Jacopo Carucci Pontormo, Saint John the Baptist , c. 1515

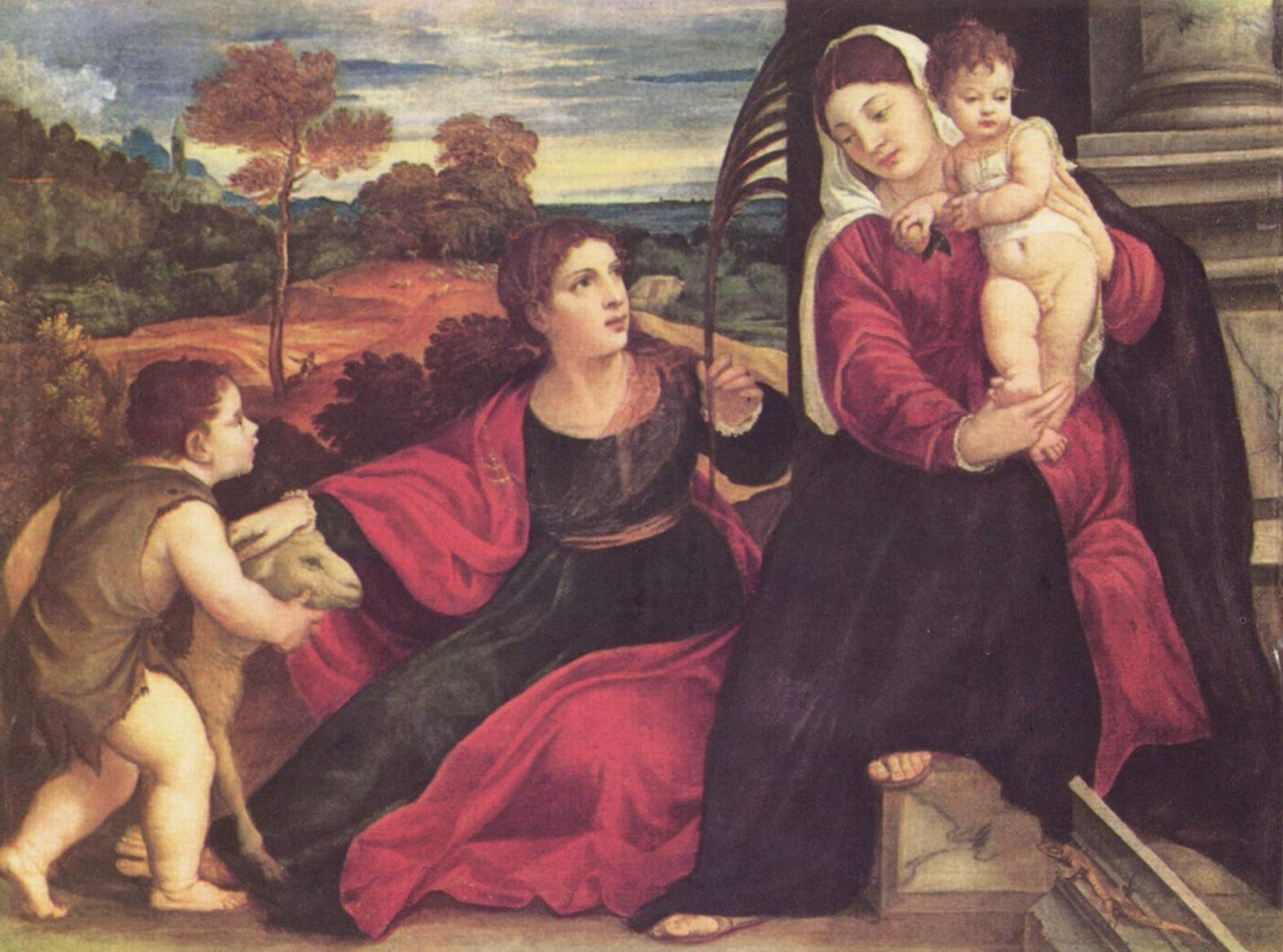
Titian, The Virgin, the Child, Saint Agnes and Saint John the Baptist, mid-16th c.

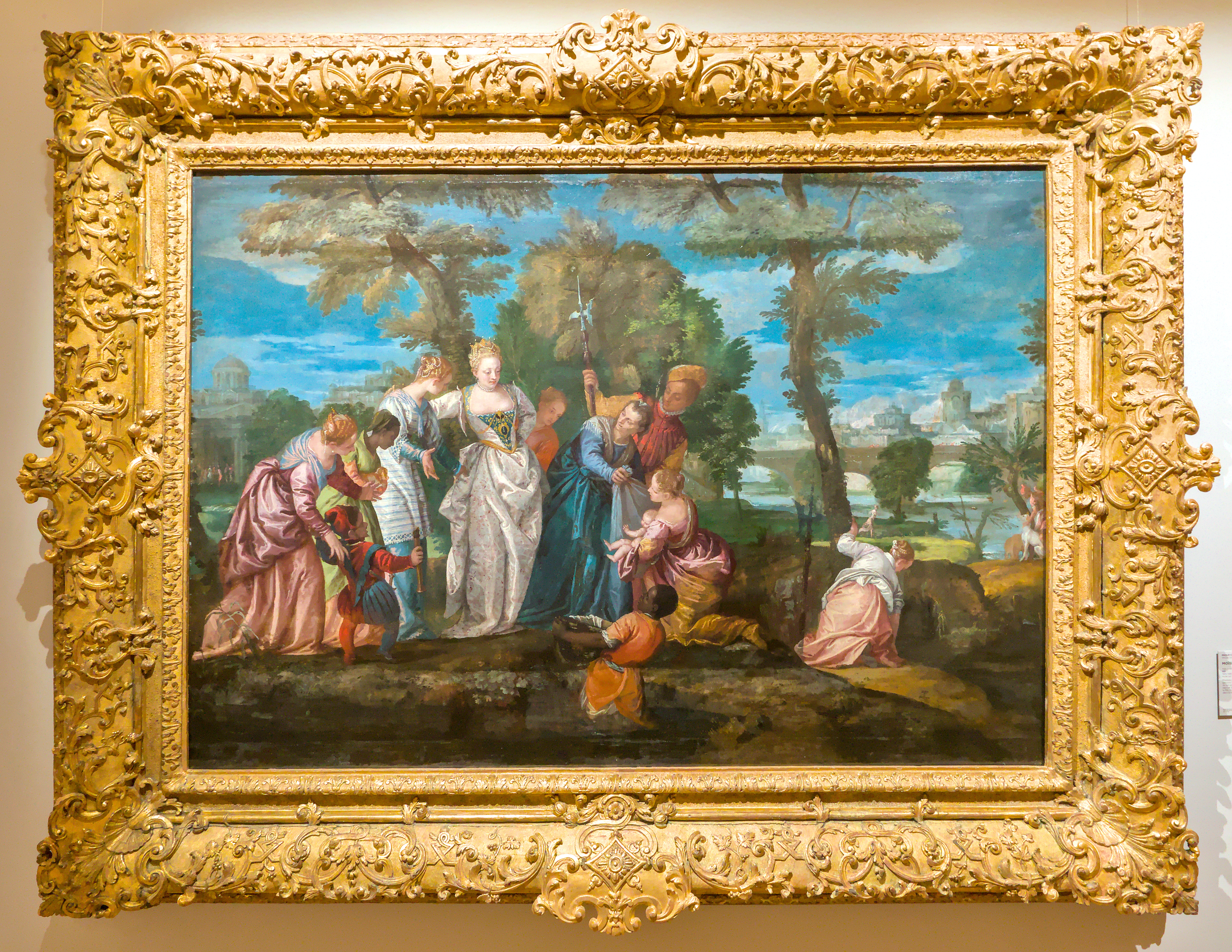
Paolo Veronese, The finding of Moses, 1713

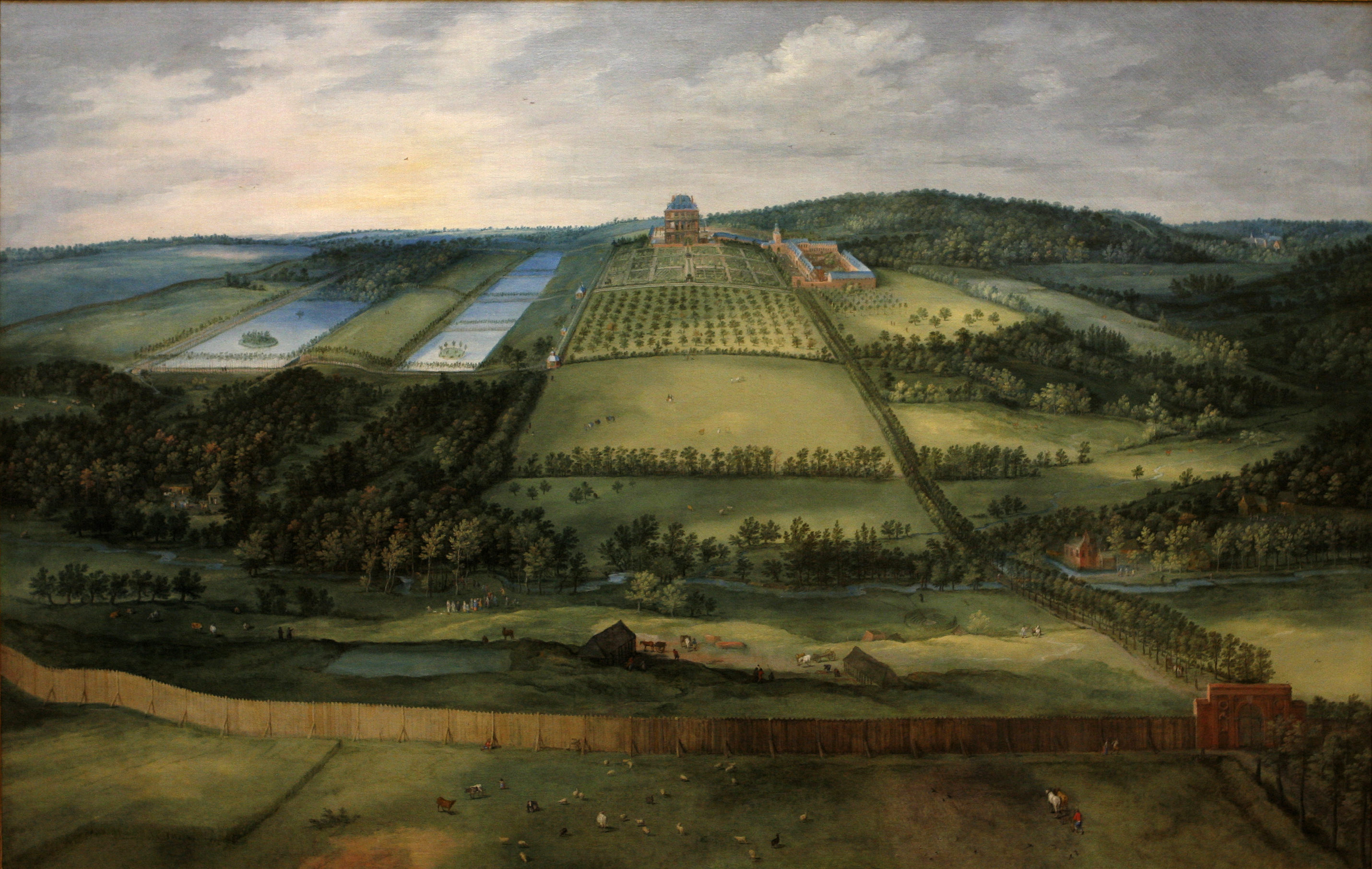
Jan Brueghel the Elder, Château of Mariemont, 1612

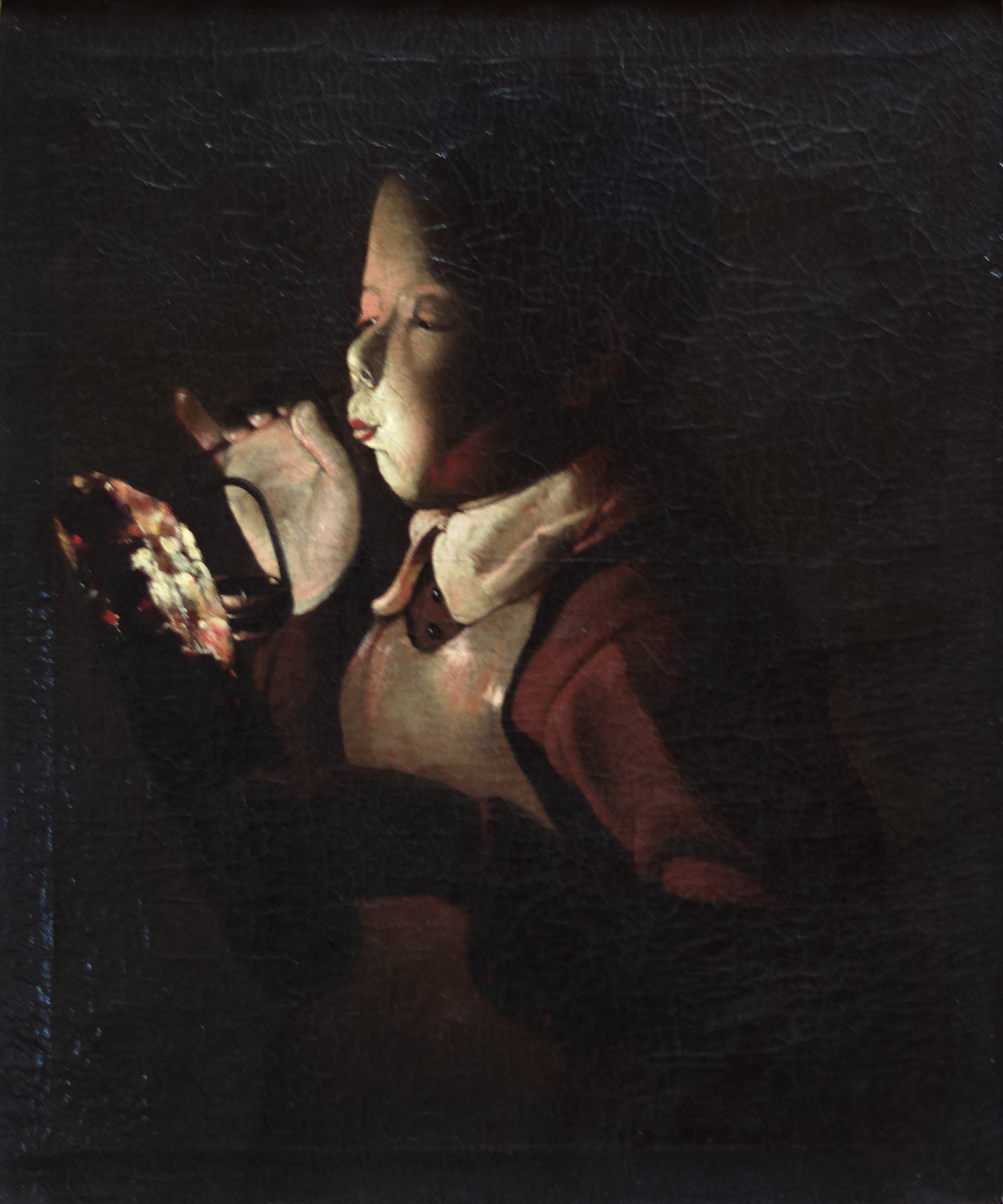
Georges de La Tour, The Blower with a lamp, 1649

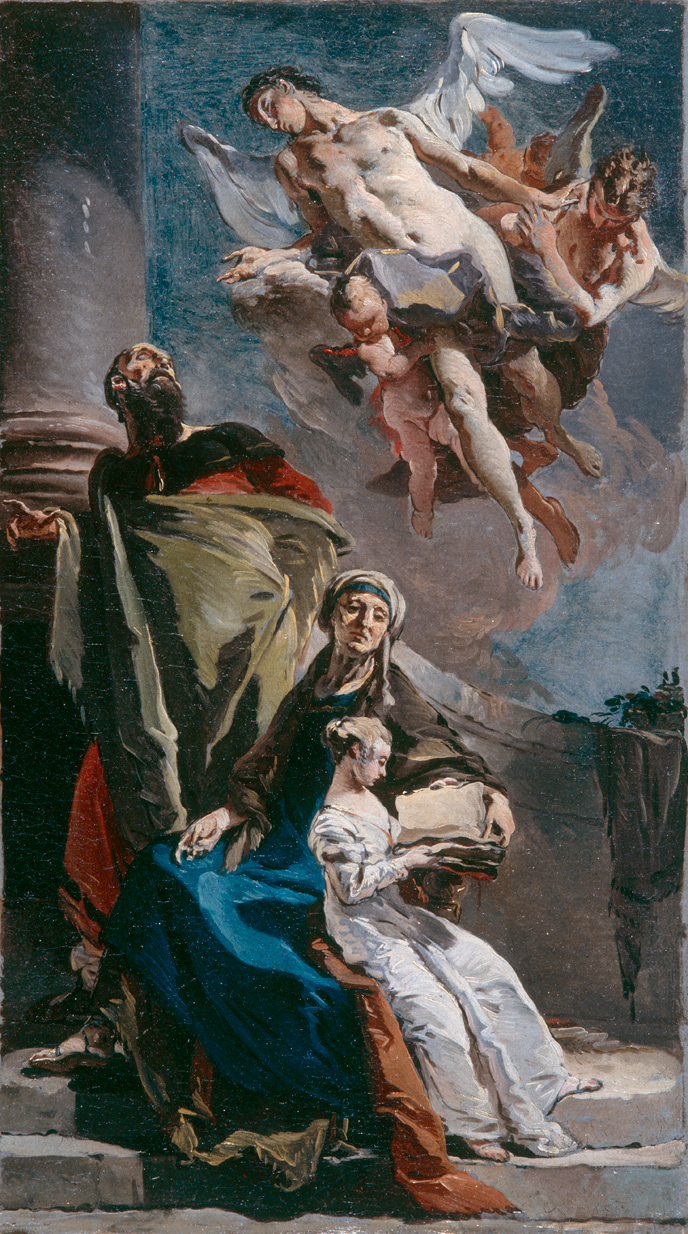
Giambattista Tiepolo, The Education of the Virgin, c. 1720–1722

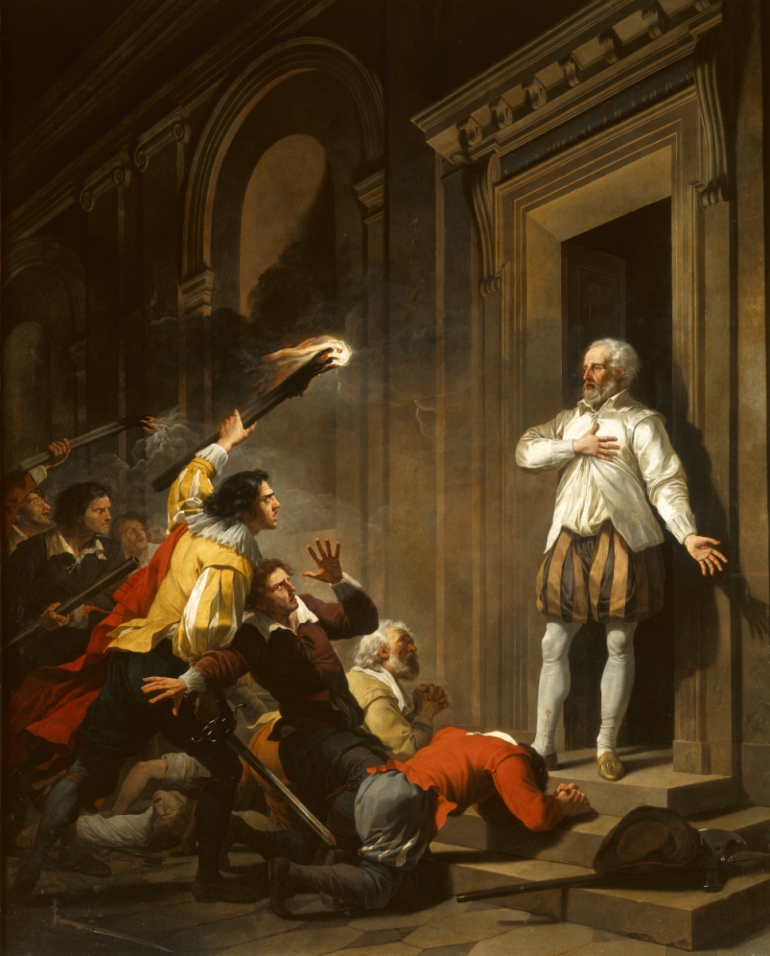
Admiral Coligny Confronts His Assassins by Joseph-Benoît Suvée, 1787

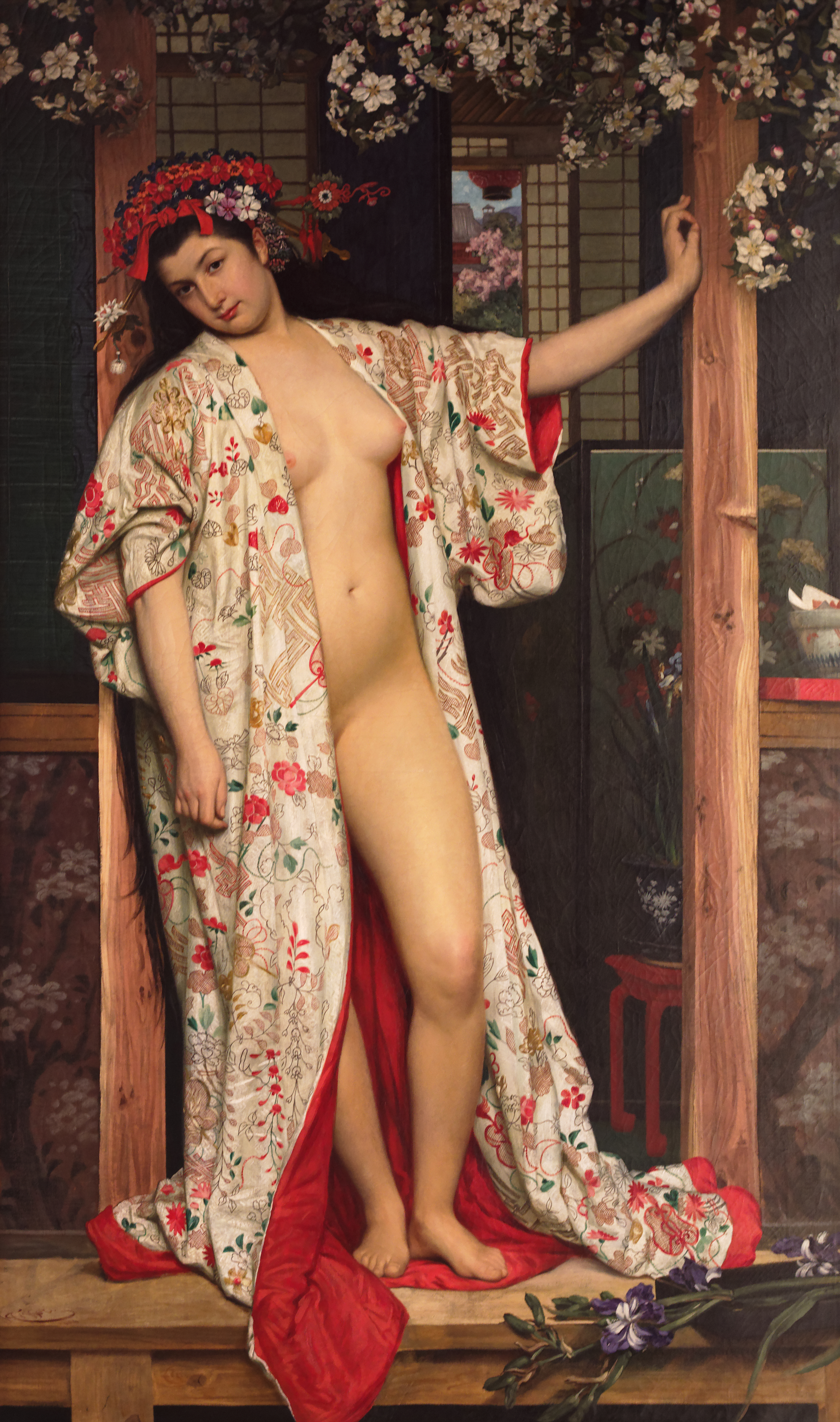
James Tissot, Japanese Girl Bathing, 1864

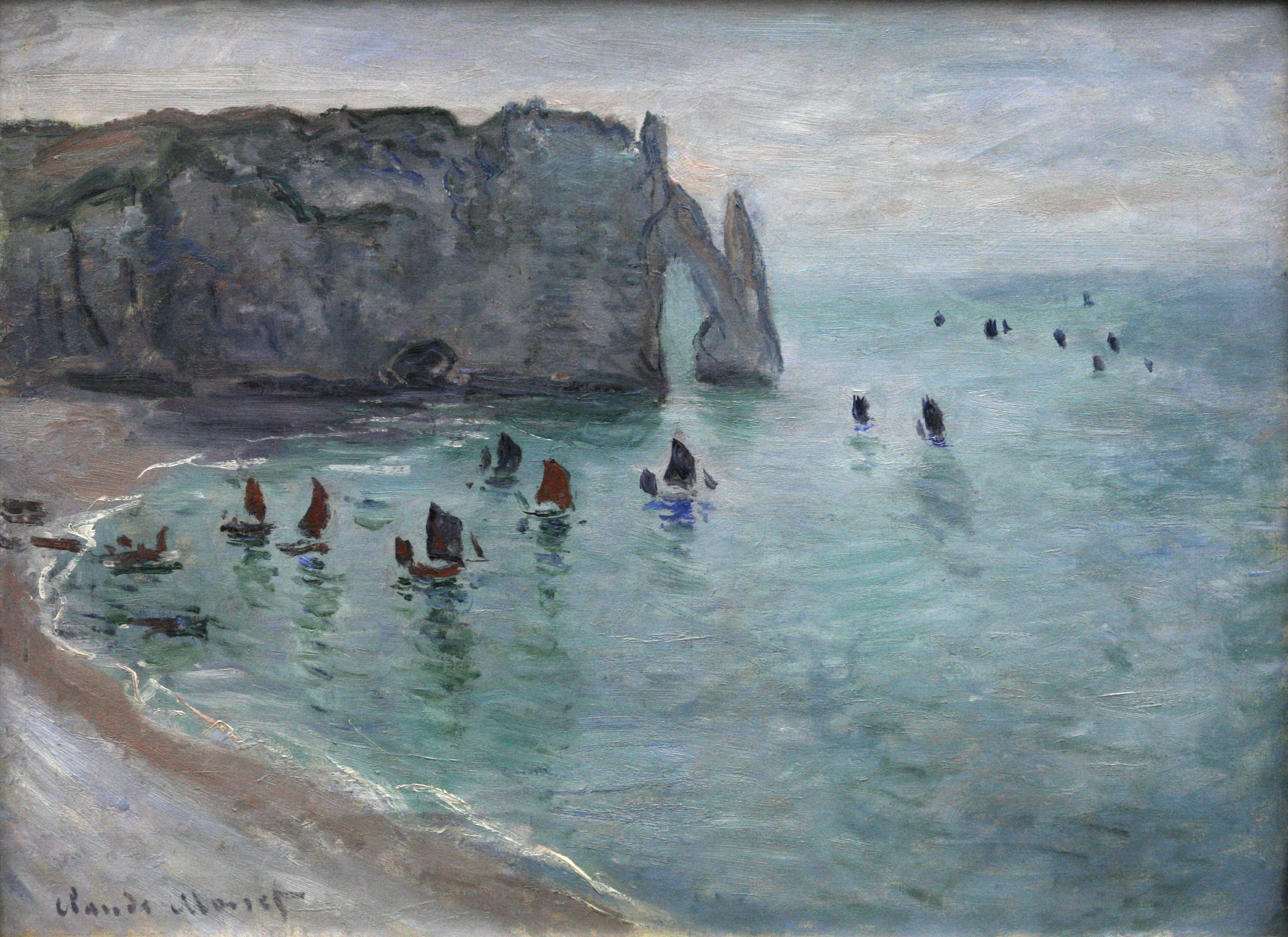
Claude Monet, Etretat the Aval door: fishing boats leaving the harbour, 1885
