= Palace of the Dukes of Burgundy =

Coordinates: 47°19′18″N 5°2′30″E

Palace of the Dukes and Estates of Burgundy
- Palais des ducs et États de Bourgogne
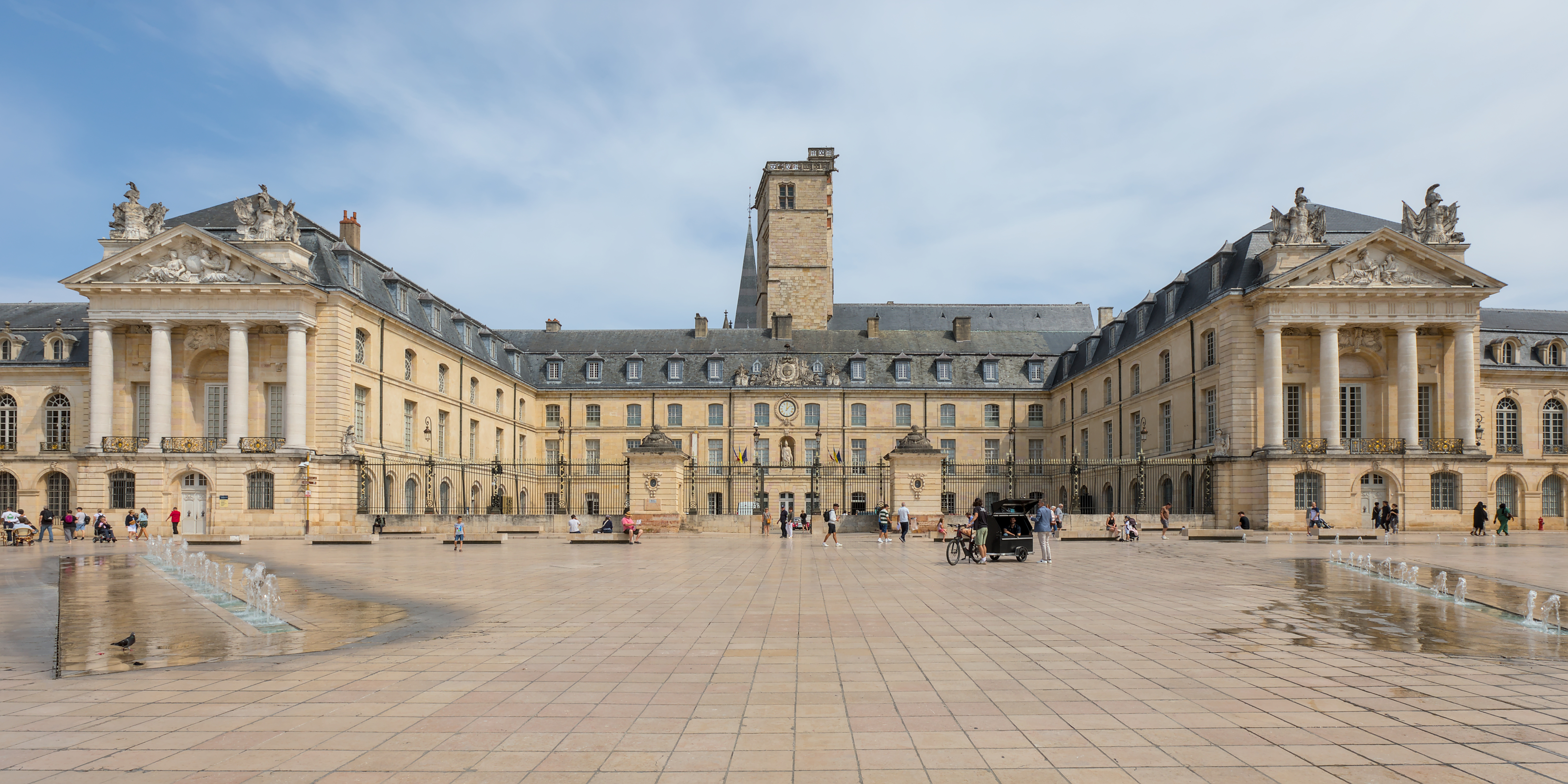
- the Palais des ducs et des états de Bourgogne

General information
- Type: Ducal Residence, Royal residence
- Architectural style: Gothic architecture, Neoclassical style
- Location: Dijon
- Construction started: 1364 (for the medieval palace)
- Completed: 1689 (for the Salle des États); 1786 (for the Salle de Flore)
- Client: Philip the Bold, Duke of Burgundy

Height
- Height: 46 metres (151 ft)

Design and construction
- Architect: Jules Hardouin-Mansart

Monument historique
- Official name: Palais des Ducs et des Etats de Bourgogne (ancien)
- Type: Inscrit
- Designated: 1926
- Reference no.: PA00112427

The Palace of the Dukes and Estates of Burgundy or Palais des ducs et des États de Bourgogne is a remarkably well-preserved architectural assemblage in Dijon. The oldest part is the 14th and 15th century Gothic ducal palace and seat of the Dukes of Burgundy, made up of a logis still visible on Place de la Liberation, the ducal kitchens on Cour de Bar, the Tour de Philippe le Bon, a "guette" overlooking the whole city, and Tour de Bar. Most of what can be seen today, however, was built in the 17th and especially the 18th centuries, in a neoclassical style, when the palace was a royal residence building and housed the estates of Burgundy. Finally, the façade of the musée on place de la Sainte-Chapelle was added in the 19th century: it was erected on the site of the palace's Sainte-Chapelle, demolished in 1802. The Palace houses the city's Hôtel de Ville (City Hall) and the musée des Beaux-Arts (Museum of Fine Arts). It was designated a monument historique by the French government in 1926.

== History of the Palace of the Dukes ==
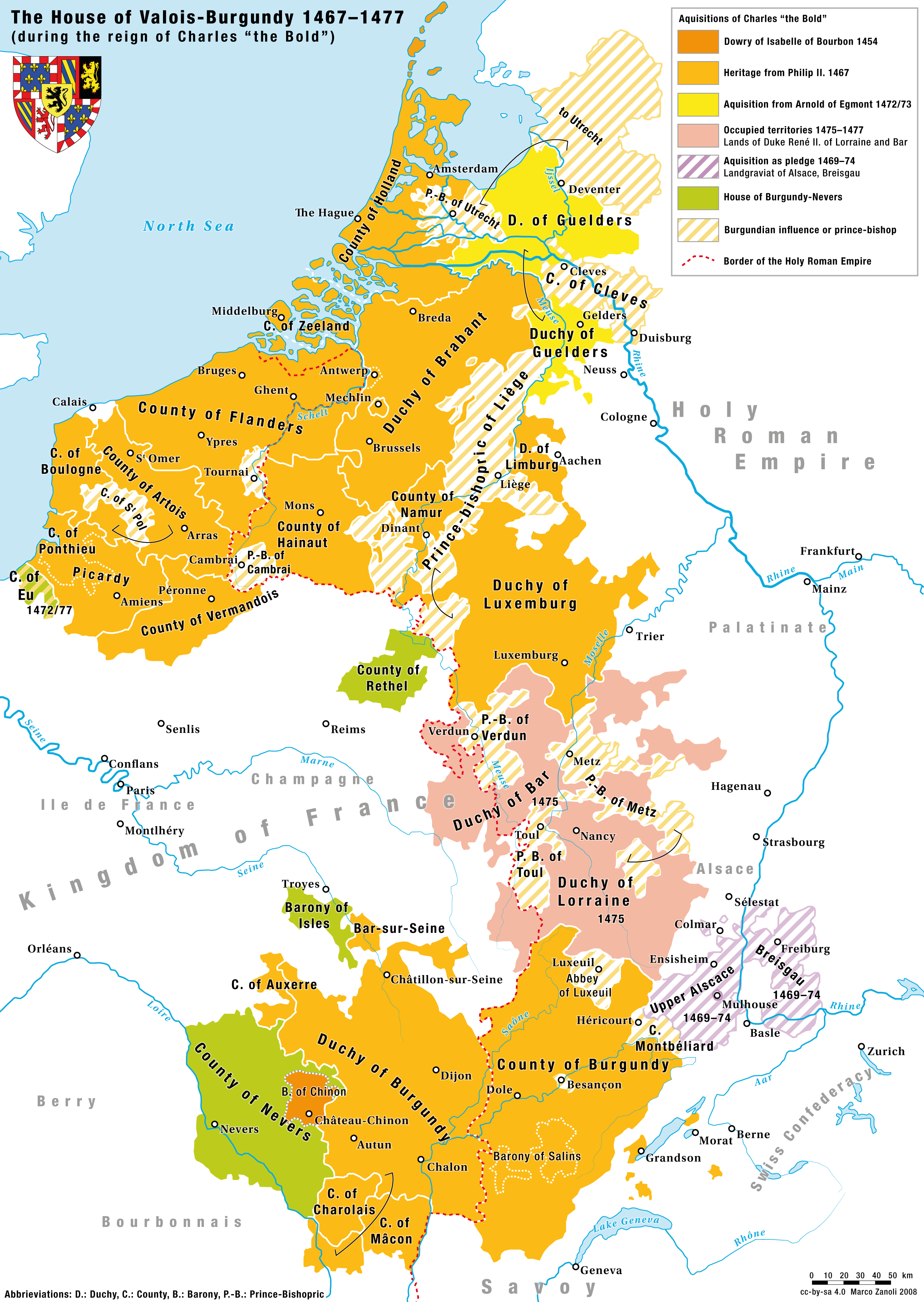
Map of the Duchy of Burgundy in 1477

The Duchy of Burgundy was founded in the 9th century, around the year 880, from the Kingdom of Burgundy by the Carolingian kings of France, Louis III and Carloman II, and the Princes who shared the Carolingian Empire, after reorganizing the entire kingdom into duchies and counties. Richard, Count of Autun, known as "Richard the Justiciar", was named the first Margrave and Duke of Burgundy. He was one of the six in the French Peerage installed under his suzerain, King Louis III of France.

The seat of the duchy was originally a simple castle dating from the 1st century. Philip the Bold initiated the rebuilding of the site starting with the Tour de Bar (Bar Tower) which was constructed on the east of the site to a design by Belin de Comblanchien and completed in 1365. René of Anjou was captured by Antoine, Count of Vaudémont at the Battle of Bulgnéville on 2 July 1431, and was held in the tower until 1437.

The Sainte-Chapelle (Holy Chapel) was built to the east of the Tour de Bar. Construction started with the choir in 1196; the nave, designed in the Gothic Style, followed in the 13th century and work on the towers started in 1494. The chapel was consecrated in 1500. The chapel was host to a portrait of Christ seated on a throne and covered in blood: this image had been presented to Philip the Good by Pope Eugene IV in 1433. The façade of the chapel was decorated by Claus Sluter, who created a sculpture of John the Evangelist, in stone from Asnières-lès-Dijon, 2.6 metres (8 ft 6 in) high, with a shield bearing the arms of Burgundy. Philip the Good declared the chapel the be the "place, chapter and college" of the Order of the Golden Fleece in January 1432. He organised the chapter of 1433 there and instituted a solemn and daily mass said by a chapter of twenty-four canons, the same number as the knights of the Order. This mass was celebrated in the chapel until 1789. After the French Revolution, the chapel was considered too expensive to maintain and it was demolished in 1802.

The core of the Ducal Palace was built in the centre of the site from the 15th century. The Grande Salle du Palais (Grand Room of the Palace), also known as the Salle des Gardes (Guardroom), was created on the first floor of the building. It was 18 metres (59 ft) long, 9 meters (30 ft) wide and 9 meters (30 ft) high. It was restored after a major fire in 1503 and was rebuilt for the visit of Henry II in 1548.

The Tour de Philippe le Bon (Tower of Philip the Good) was erected on the west side of the Ducal Palace and completed in 1455. It was 46 metres (151 ft) high and continues to dominate the site. A monumental fireplace was installed in the room on the top floor and an observatory was installed there in the 18th century.

The ducal kitchens were completed in 1431. They are formed around a room, which is 12 meters (39 ft) long on each side, with a vaulted roof supported by eight columns.

=== The Dukes of Burgundy ruler of the Duchy of Burgundy (1363–1477) ===
- Philip the Bold (1342–1404), son of the King John II of France
- John the Fearless (1371–1419)
- Philip the Good (1396–1467)
- Charles the Bold (1433–1477)
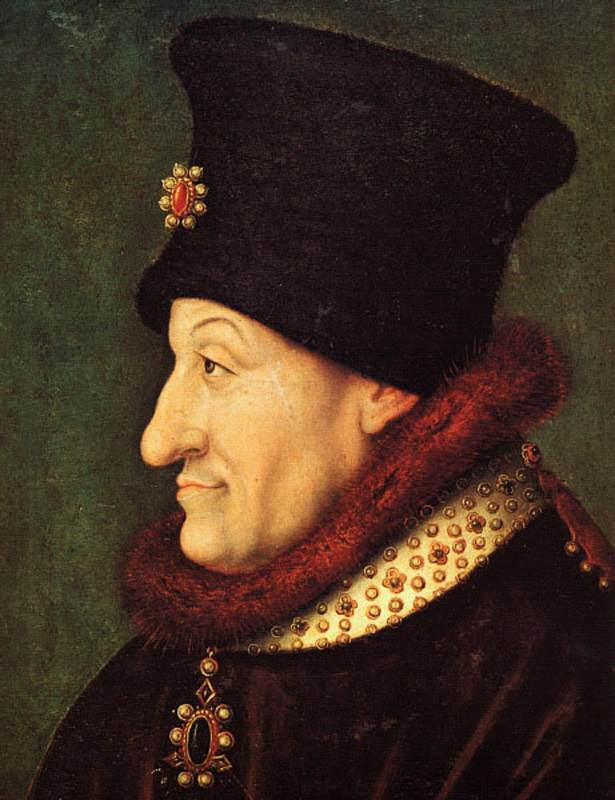
Philip the Bold (1342–1404)

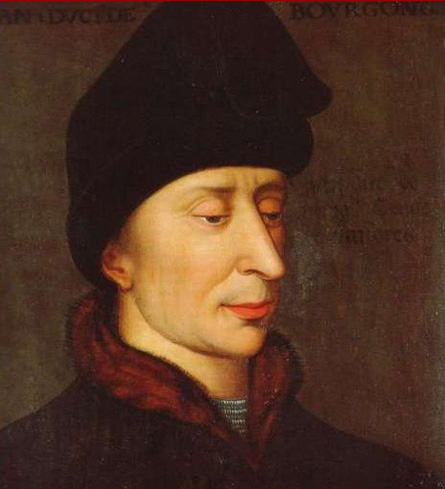
John the Fearless (1371–1419)

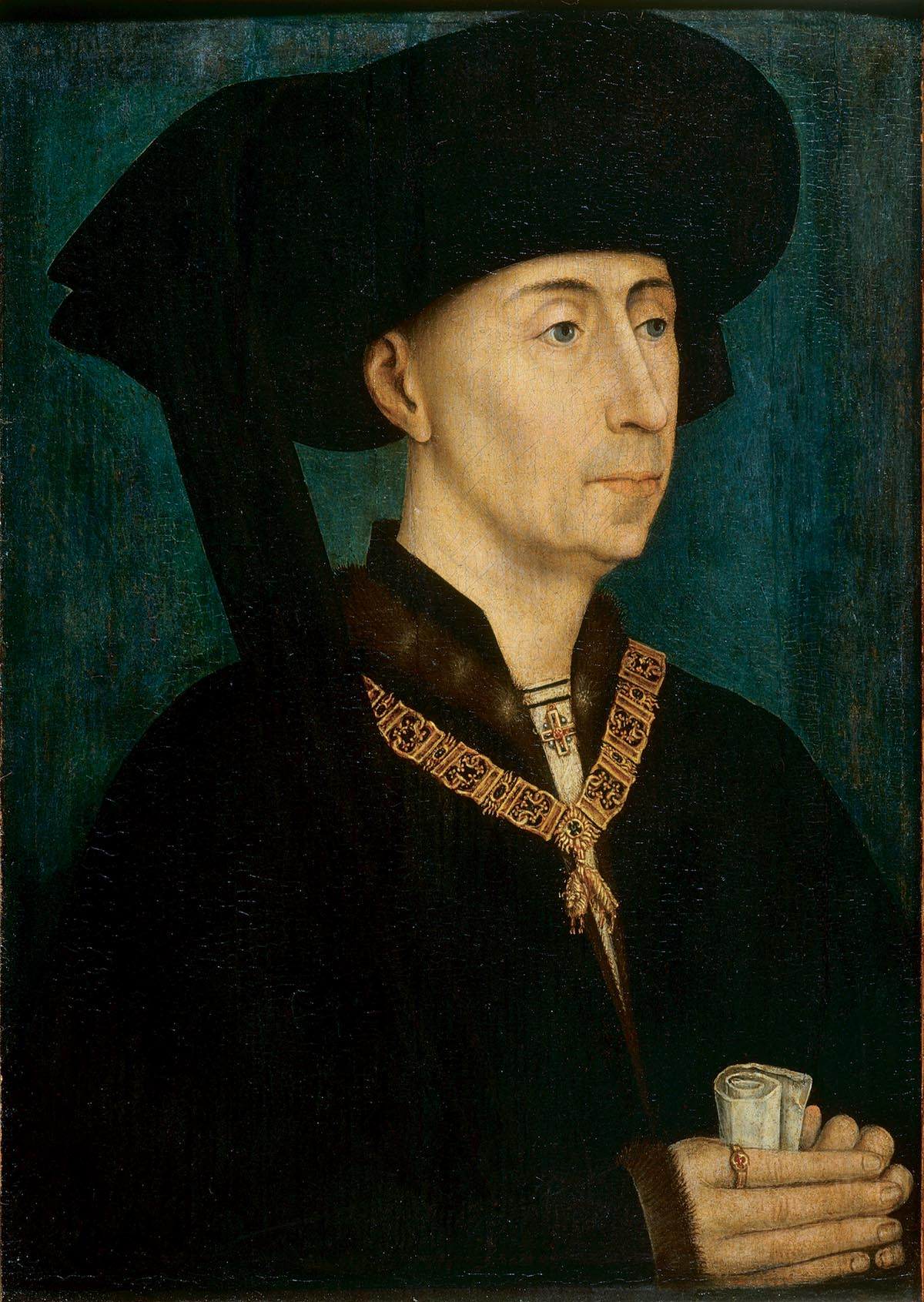
Philip the Good (1396–1467)

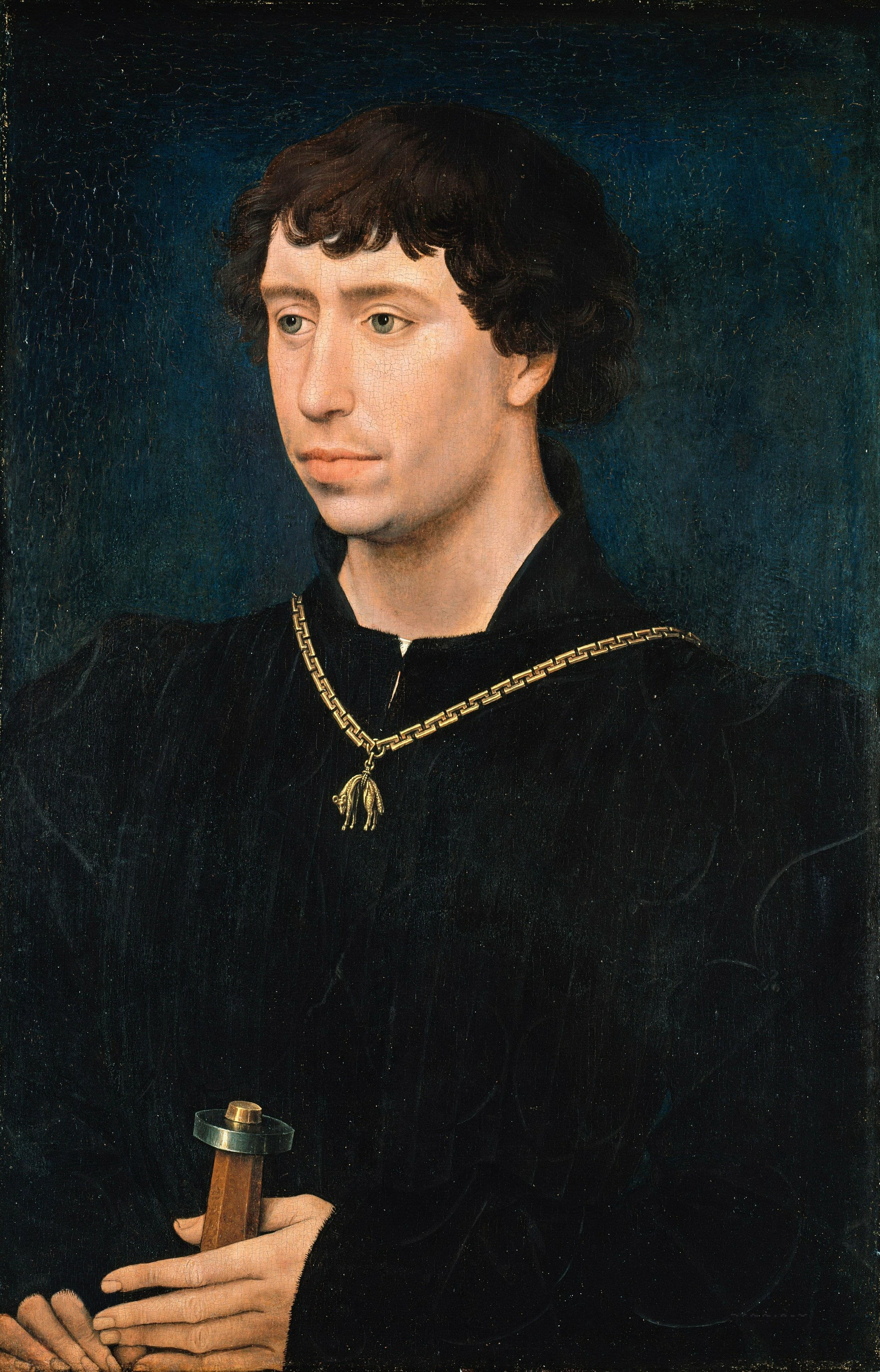
Charles the Bold (1433–1477)

== Palace of the Estates of Burgundy ==
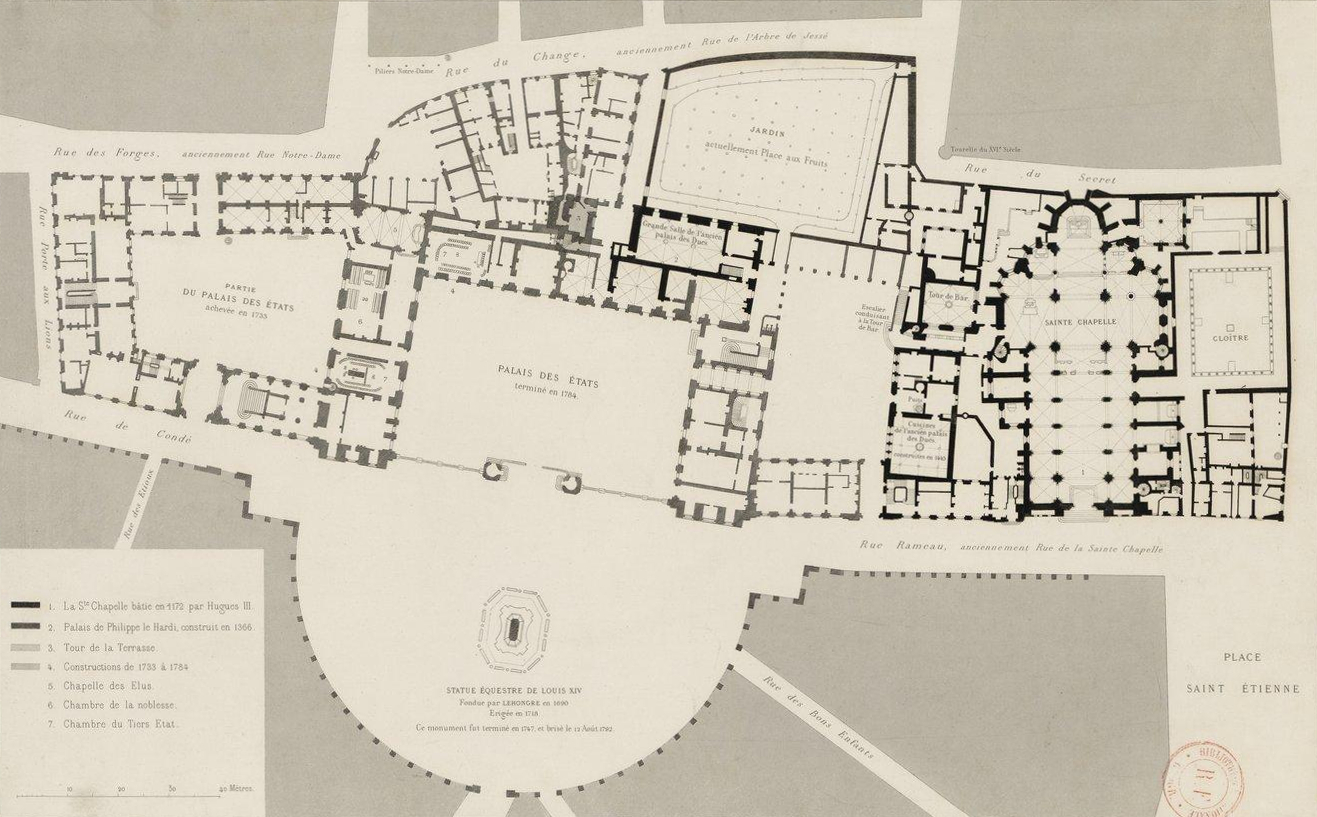
Plan of the Palace

The palace was turned into a royal residence when the Duchy of Burgundy was occupied by the Kingdom of France after the death of Charles the Bold, in 1477, and the treaty of Arras of 1482 between King Louis XI and Maximilian I, Holy Roman Emperor.

The layout involved a central courtyard (completed in 1784), a western wing, known as the Cour de Flore, (completed in 1733) and an eastern wing, known as the Cour de Bar, (completed on the site of the former chapel in the early 19th century). The sections on the east and west of the courtyard were fronted by tetrastyle porticos formed by Doric order columns supporting pediments with fine carvings in the tympanum. The complex was designed by Jules Hardouin-Mansart in the neoclassical style, built in ashlar stone and was completed in the early 19th century.

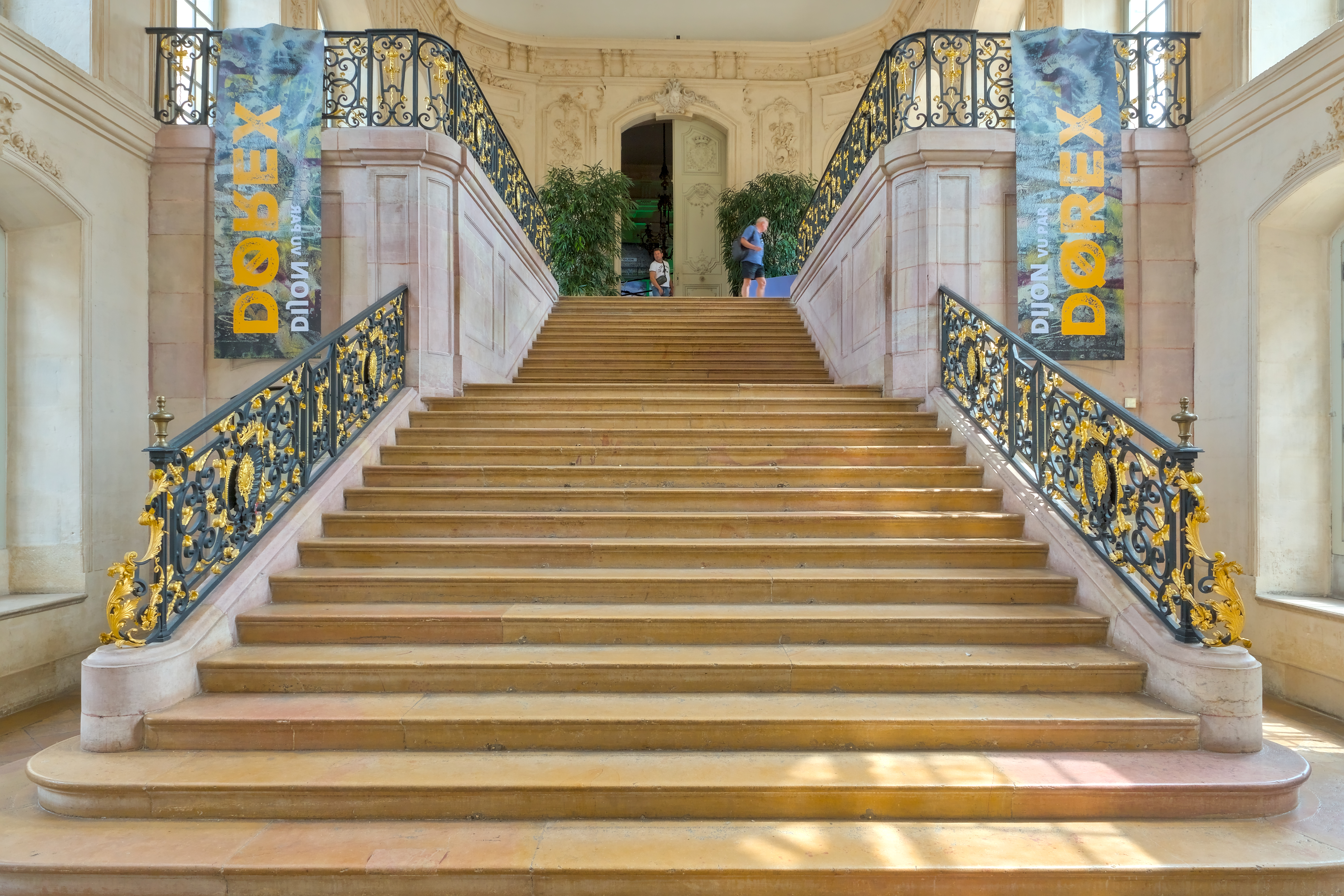
Grand Escalier

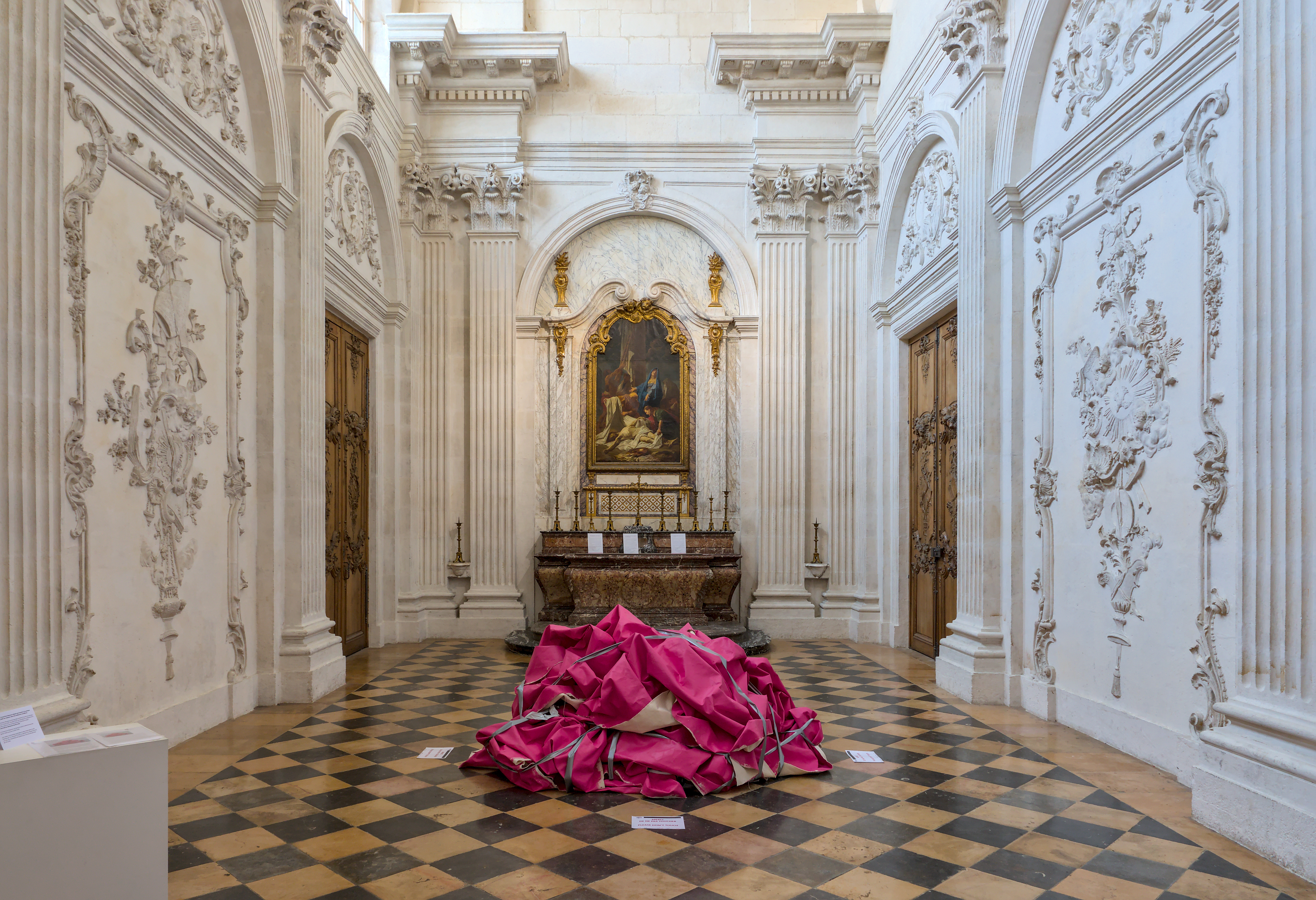
Chapelle des Élus

The new rooms included:

- The Salle des États: The États de Bourgogne (Estates of Burgundy), composed of representatives of the three orders: nobility, clergy and third estate, who met every three years to vote on taxes and make important decisions for the administration of the province, wanted a place to meet. It was completed in 1689.
- The Salle de Flore: This room, which overlooks the Cour de Flore, was intended to serve as the banqueting hall of the États de Bourgogne and was completed in 1786. It has served as the Hôtel de Ville (City Hall) of Dijon City Council, (Note: The council was based at the former house of Nicolas Rolin from his death in 1462 until 1831.) as a concert hall, and as a reception hall since 1831.
- Grand Escalier: The staircase was designed by Jacques Gabriel to provide a grand entrance to the Salle des États and was completed in 1737.
- The Chapelle des Élus: This chapel was designed by Jacques Gabriel in the Rococo style and was completed in 1739.

In 1765, François Devosge established a public drawing school in the building: this was to become the basis for the Musée des Beaux-Arts.

A new square, the Place Royale, was established in front of the complex in 1692. An equestrian statue created in bronze by Étienne Le Hongre depicting Louis XIV was unveiled in the centre of the square on 15 April 1725. Following the French Revolution, the palace was renamed the "Maison Nationale" by the revolutionaries and the statue of Louis XIV was torn down and destroyed on 15 August 1792.

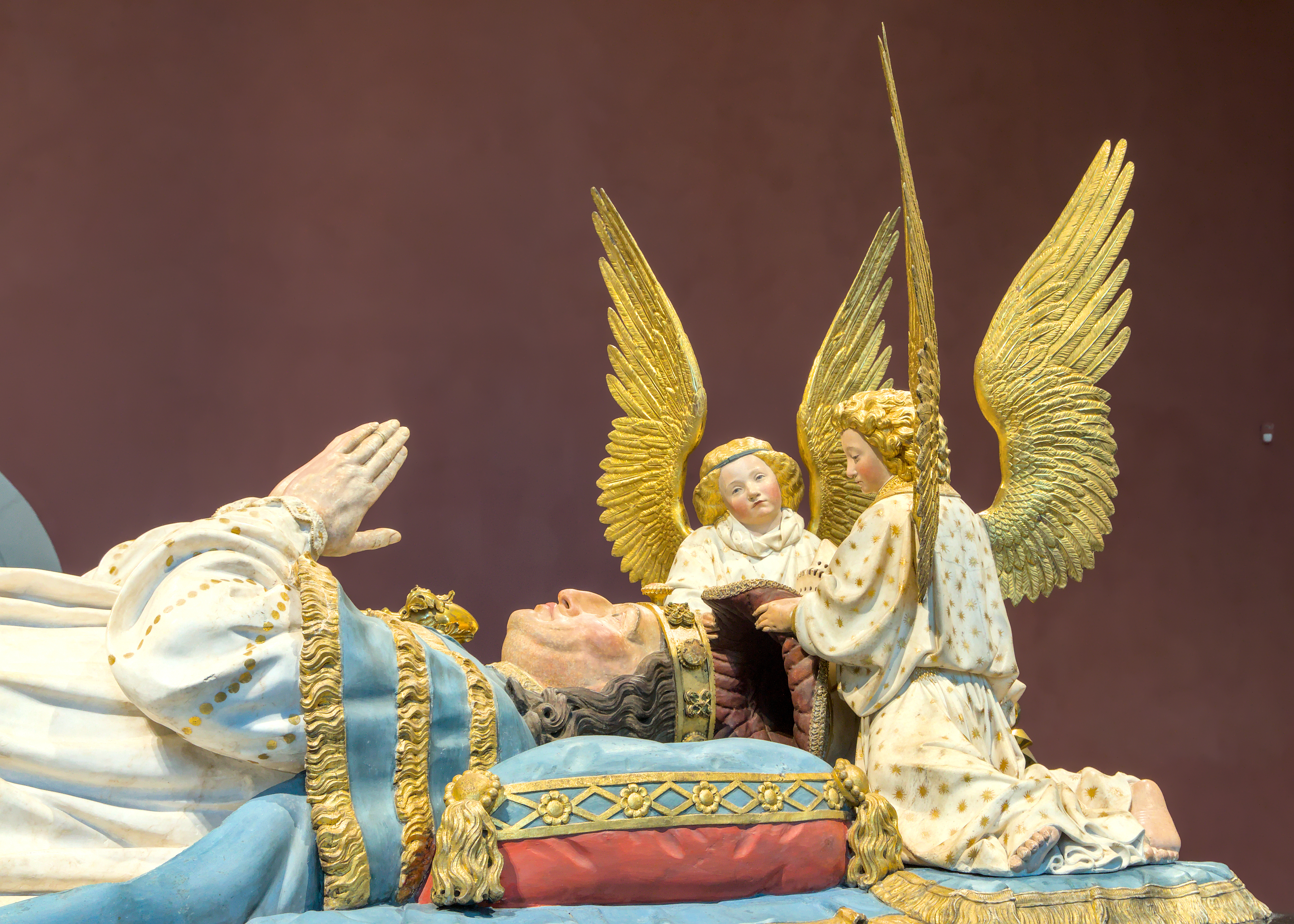
Tomb of duke Philip the Bold, in the Salle des Gardes

In the mid-19th century, the Philippe le Bon Tower became a Chappe telegraph station for communications between Paris and Lyon and later between Dijon and Besançon.

Following the demolition of the Chartreuse de Champmol, two restored ducal tombs were installed in the Salle des Gardes in 1827, helping to underline the status of Dijon and its palace as the regional capital. During the renovation of the palace between 2010 and 2012, several sculptures from the tombs travelled on exhibition.

=== Governors of Burgundy ===
After 1477, the kings of France named governors to rule Burgundy. Sometimes they came personally to Dijon, where the palace was turned into a royal residence to receive them while in the province of Burgundy.

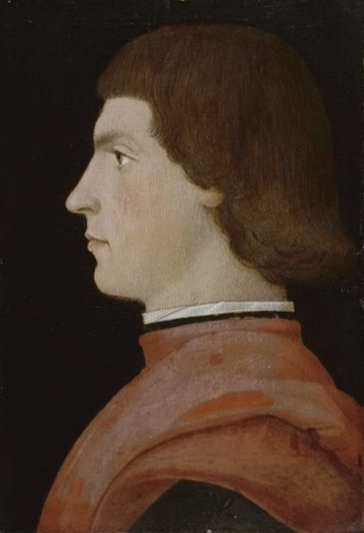
Louis de la Trémoïlle (1460–1525)

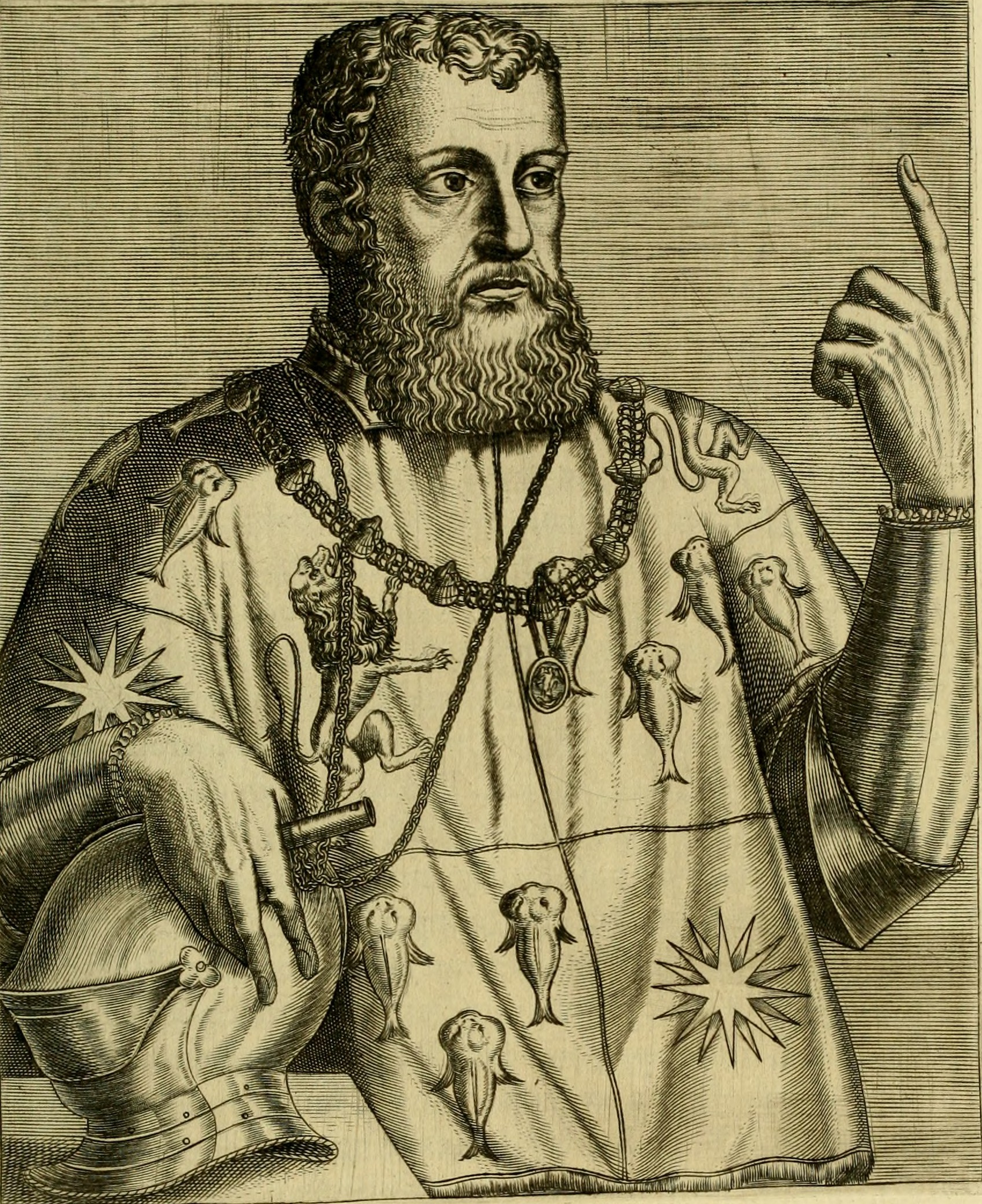
Philippe de Chabot (1492–1543)

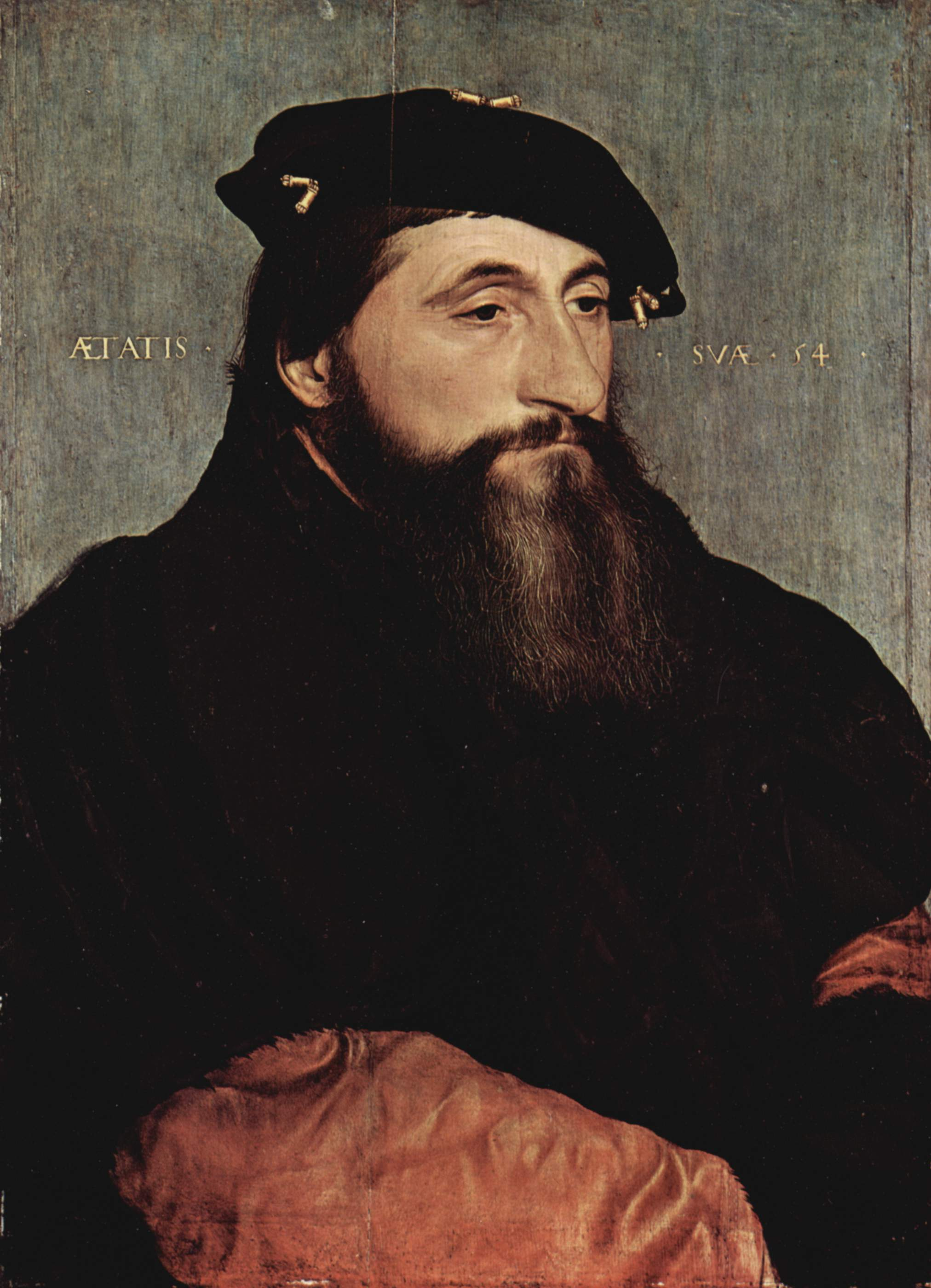
Antoine de Lorraine (1489–1544)

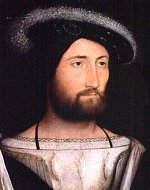
Claude de Lorraine (1496–1550)

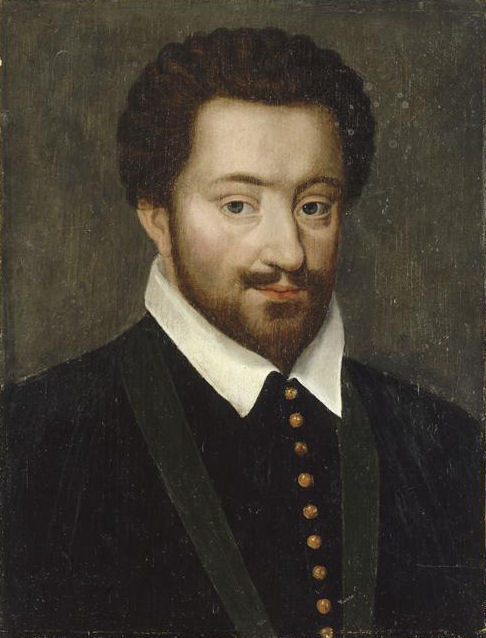
Charles, duc de Mayenne (1554–1611)

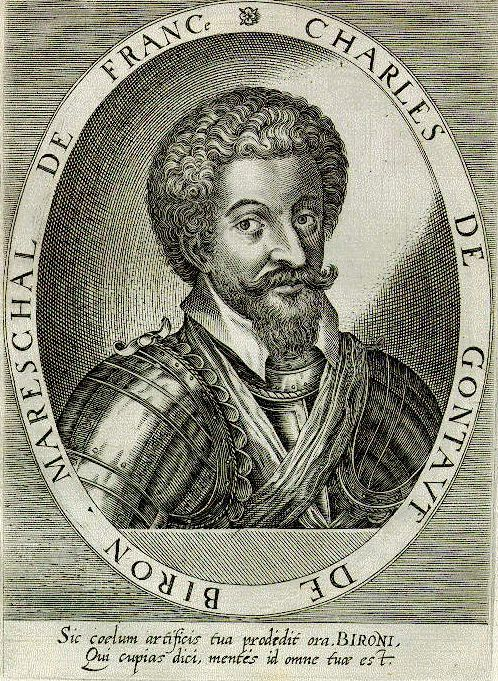
Charles de Gontaut, duc de Biron (1562–1602)

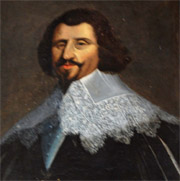
Roger de Saint-Lary de Termes, duc de Bellegarde (1562–1646)

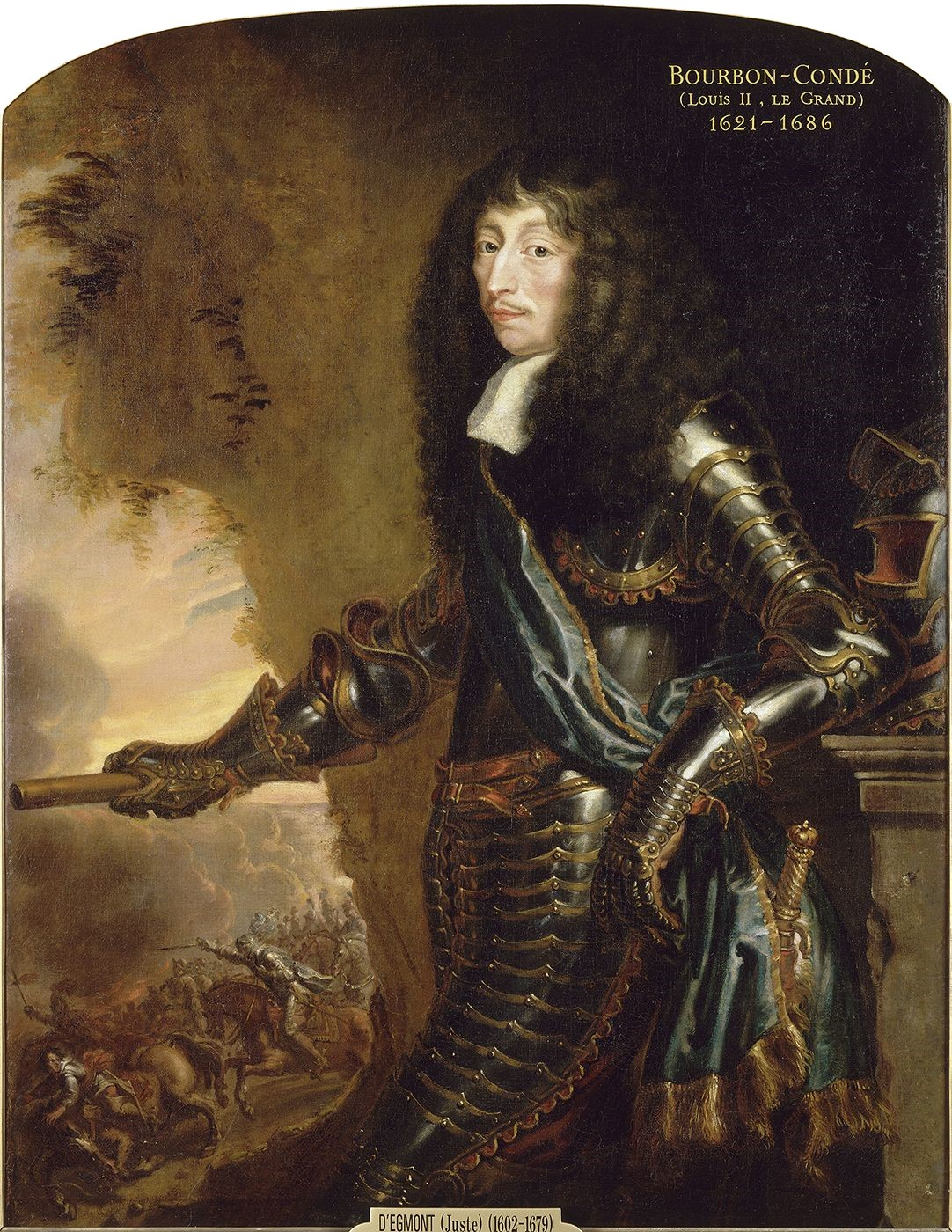
Le Grand Condé (1621–1686)

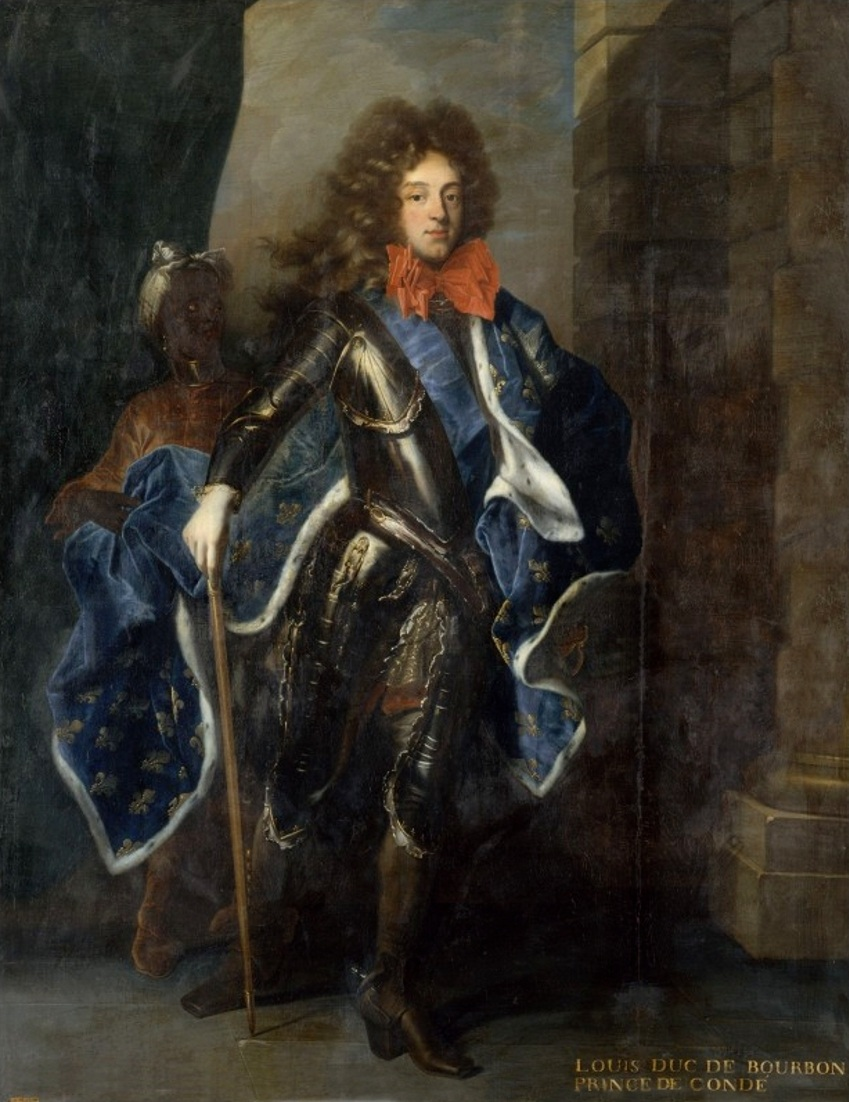
Louis de Bourbon Condé (1692–1740)

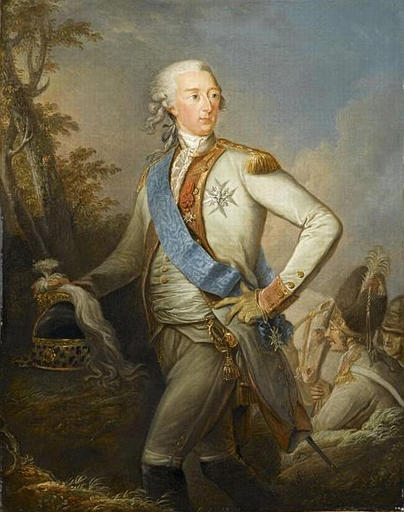
Louis Joseph de Bourbon Condé (1736–1818)

== See also ==
- Musée des Beaux-Arts de Dijon
- Dukes of Burgundy
- Dijon
