= 2024 French legislative election in Côte-d'Or =

Following the first round of the 2024 French legislative election on 30 June 2024, runoff elections in each constituency where no candidate received a vote share greater than 50 percent were scheduled for 7 July. Candidates permitted to stand in the runoff elections needed to either come in first or second place in the first round or achieve more than 12.5 percent of the votes of the entire electorate (as opposed to 12.5 percent of the vote share due to low turnout).

== Côte-d'Or ==
=== 1st constituency ===
Candidate	Party or alliance		First round		Second round	
Candidate	Party or alliance		Votes	%	Votes	%
Océane Godard	New Popular Front	Socialist Party	14,679	29.16	18,716	37.15
Didier Martin	Ensemble	Renaissance	13,830	27.48	17,314	34.36
Cyline Humblot-Cornille	National Rally		12,969	25.77	14,356	28.49
François-Xavier Dugourd	The Republicans		6,126	12.17		
Sladana Zivkovic	Miscellaneous left		2,232	4.43		
Julien Thevenin	Far-left	Lutte Ouvrière	497	0.99		
Total			50,333	100.00	50,386	100.00
Valid votes			50,333	98.22	50,386	97.34
Invalid votes			255	0.50	298	0.58
Blank votes			657	1.28	1,081	2.09
Total votes			51,245	100.00	51,765	100.00
Registered voters/turnout			70,495	72.69	70,511	73.41

=== 2nd constituency ===
Candidate	Party or alliance		First round		Second round	
Candidate	Party or alliance		Votes	%	Votes	%
Tatiana Guyenot	National Rally		17,181	34.64	21,184	46.37
Catherine Hervieu	New Popular Front	The Ecologists	13,723	27.67	24,496	53.63
Benoit Bordat	Ensemble	Renaissance	12,225	24.65		
Laurent Bourguignat	The Republicans		3,982	8.03		
Julien Gonzalez	Ecologists	Independent	1,222	2.46		
Claire Rocher	Far-left	Lutte Ouvrière	522	1.05		
Franck Gaillard	Reconquête		512	1.03		
Elisabeth Bertrand	Sovereigntist right	Independent	231	0.47		
Total			49,598	100.00	45,680	100.00
Valid votes			49,598	97.99	45,680	90.66
Invalid votes			248	0.49	949	1.88
Blank votes			767	1.52	3,758	7.46
Total votes			50,613	100.00	50,387	100.00
Registered voters/turnout			72,011	70.29	72,032	69.95

=== 3rd constituency ===
Candidate	Party or alliance		First round		Second round	
Candidate	Party or alliance		Votes	%	Votes	%
Thierry Coudert	Union of the far right	The Republicans	17,405	35.44	21,645	46.85
Pierre Pribetich	New Popular Front	Socialist Party	14,532	29.59	24,554	53.15
Fadila Khattabi	Ensemble	Renaissance	11,695	23.81		
Charle Bourgadel	The Republicans		3,611	7.35		
Georges Mezui	Miscellaneous left	Independent	1,176	2.39		
Fabienne Delorme	Far-left	Lutte Ouvrière	694	1.41		
Total			49,113	100.00	46,199	100.00
Valid votes			49,113	97.53	46,199	91.33
Invalid votes			319	0.63	821	1.62
Blank votes			927	1.84	3,566	7.05
Total votes			50,359	100.00	50,586	100.00
Registered voters/turnout			72,426	69.53	72,452	69.82

=== 4th constituency ===
Candidate	Party or alliance		First round		Second round	
Candidate	Party or alliance		Votes	%	Votes	%
Sophie Dumont	National Rally		19,881	42.33	21,480	46.04
Hubert Brigand	The Republicans		16,531	35.20	25,179	53.96
Valérie Jacq	New Popular Front	La France Insoumise	9,616	20.47		
Michel Denizot	Far-left	Lutte Ouvrière	940	2.00		
Total			46,968	100.00	46,659	100.00
Valid votes			46,968	96.99	46,659	95.62
Invalid votes			374	0.77	474	0.97
Blank votes			1,083	2.24	1,665	3.41
Total votes			48,425	100.00	48,798	100.00
Registered voters/turnout			67,447	71.80	67,452	72.34

=== 5th constituency ===
Candidate	Party or alliance		First round		Second round	
Candidate	Party or alliance		Votes	%	Votes	%
René Lioret	National Rally		26,514	45.31	28,677	50.04
Didier Paris	Ensemble	Renaissance	18,128	30.98	28,633	49.96
Jérôme Flache	New Popular Front	Communist Party	11,296	19.30		
Arnaud Cheront	Miscellaneous right	Independent	1,531	2.62		
Françoise Petet	Far-left	Lutte Ouvrière	818	1.40		
Nicolas Baudot	Miscellaneous centre	Independent	233	0.40		
Total			58,520	100.00	57,310	100.00
Valid votes			58,520	96.69	57,310	94.26
Invalid votes			540	0.89	880	1.45
Blank votes			1,464	2.42	2,611	4.29
Total votes			60,524	100.00	60,801	100.00
Registered voters/turnout			85,576	70.73	85,570	71.05
