= François Rebsamen =

French politician (born 1951)

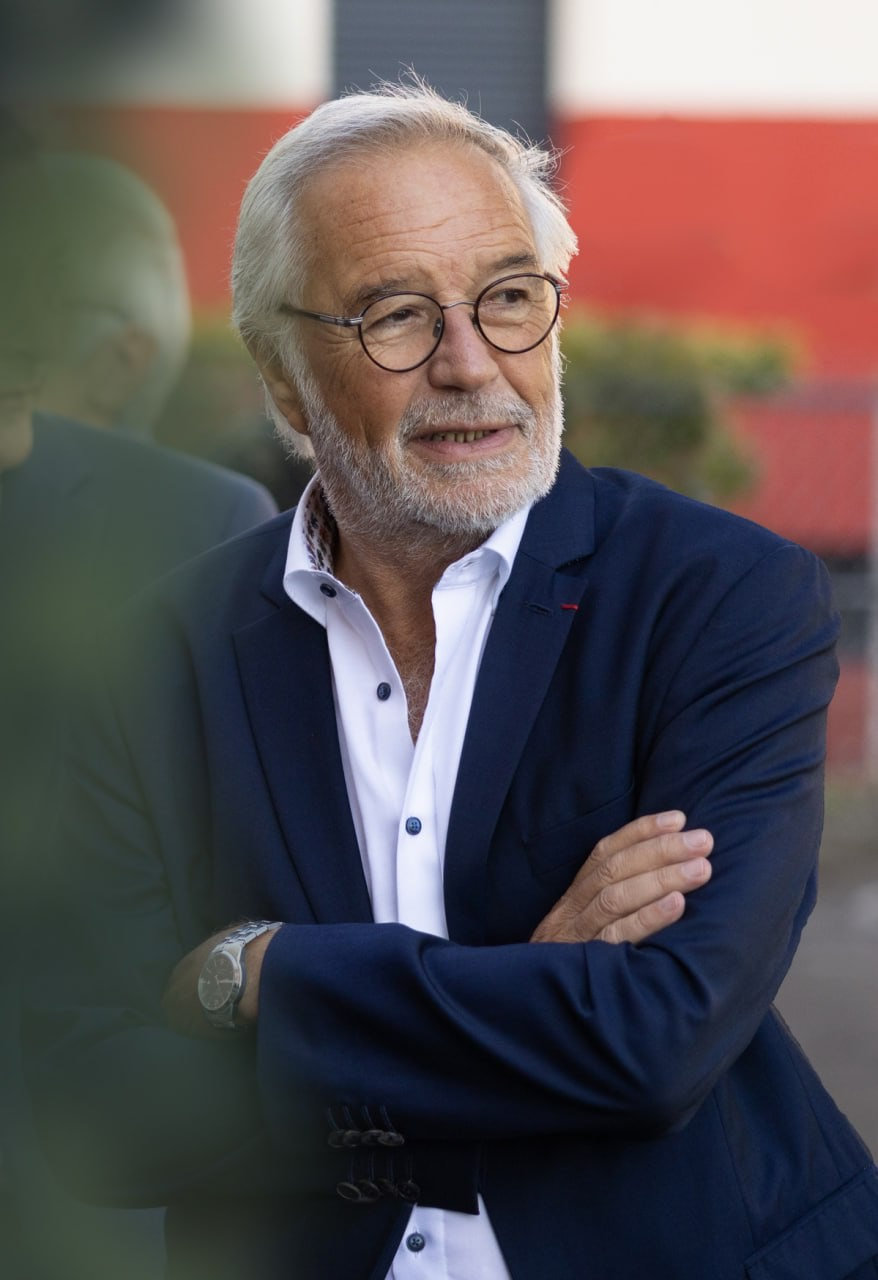
- Rebsamen in 2023

Minister for Territorial Development and Decentralisation
- In office 23 December 2024 – 5 October 2025
- Prime Minister: François Bayrou
- Preceded by: Catherine Vautrin
- Succeeded by: Éric Woerth

Minister of Labour, Employment, Vocational Training and Social Dialogue
- In office 2 April 2014 – 2 September 2015
- Prime Minister: Manuel Valls
- Preceded by: Michel Sapin
- Succeeded by: Myriam El Khomri

President of the Socialist group in the Senate
- In office 1 October 2011 – 15 April 2014
- Preceded by: Jean-Pierre Bel
- Succeeded by: Didier Guillaume

Senator for Côte-d'Or
- In office 1 October 2008 – 2 May 2014
- Preceded by: Louis Grillot
- Succeeded by: Isabelle Lajoux

Mayor of Dijon
- In office 10 August 2015 – 25 November 2024
- Preceded by: Alain Millot
- Succeeded by: Nathalie Koenders
- In office 25 March 2001 – 5 April 2014
- Preceded by: Robert Poujade
- Succeeded by: Alain Millot

Member of the General Council of Côte-d'Or for the canton of Dijon-5
- In office 2 April 1998 – 1 October 2008
- Preceded by: Pierre Barbier
- Succeeded by: Laurent Grandguillaume

Personal details
- Born: François Michel Édouard Rebsamen; 25 June 1951 (age 75) Dijon, France
- Party: Progressist Federation (2022–present)
- Other political affiliations: LCR (until 1974); PS (1974–2022)
- Children: 1

François Michel Édouard Rebsamen (French pronunciation: [fʁɑ̃swa ʁɛbsamɛn]; born 25 June 1951) is a French politician who served as Minister for Territorial Development and Decentralisation in the government of Prime Minister François Bayrou from 2024 to 2025. A former member of the Socialist Party, he previously served as Minister of Labour, Employment, Vocational Training and Social Dialogue in the first and second governments of Prime Minister Manuel Valls from 2014 to 2015.

== Early life and education ==
Rebsamen is the son of Eric Gottfried Rebsamen, a Protestant who was born in Stuttgart on 9 January 1917, and worked at Renault in Dijon for several months in 1939–40. In that same city, after the war, the senior Rebsamen married Denise Agron, daughter of Édouard Agron, a surgeon and radical-socialist, originally from Briennon in Loire, who was a member of Dijon's municipal council under the Popular Front. The senior Rebsamen died in Dijon on 19 February 1974.

Rebsamen earned a master's degree in public law, a diplôme d'études supérieures spécialisées in economics and a degree in political science.

== Early career ==
Rebsamen began his professional and political career by serving as chief of staff for the Regional Council of Burgundy from 1979 to 1983, where he worked alongside Pierre Joxe (1979–1982) and André Billardon (1982–1983). He followed Joxe to various other posts, serving as his chief of staff from 1984 to 1986 and again from 1988 to 1991. He then worked under Laurent Fabius while the latter was First Secretary of the Socialist Party (1992–1993), then as technical advisor to Jean-Jack Queyranne.

== Political career ==
=== Early beginnings ===
In the early 1970s, Rebsamen was an active member of the Revolutionary Communist League, a militant group. He left in 1974.

Following the 1989 French municipal elections, Rebsamen was elected president of the Socialist group in the Dijon municipal council.

In 1994, Rebsamen was elected to the Regional Council of Burgundy, where he held a seat until 2001. In 1997 he ran in the legislative election in the 1st constituency of Côte-d'Or, but was defeated by Robert Poujade, the mayor of Dijon. In the same year, he was named National Secretary of the Socialist Party at the Brest Congress, and became the party's deputy head, under his friend François Hollande.

Rebsamen was elected in March 1998 as the general councillor of the canton of Dijon-5, winning 51.5% of the vote and defeating the incumbent, Pierre Barbier of the Rally for the Republic (RPR).

=== Mayor of Dijon ===
In the 2001 municipal election, Rebsamen became the first left-wing candidate to be elected mayor of Dijon since 1935, winning 52.1% of the vote and defeating Jean-François Bazin (RPR). That year he also became president of Grand Dijon, a post he held until 2014. He ran again for the legislature in 2002, but lost to Bernard Depierre of the Union for a Popular Movement (UMP), who succeeded Poujade. He was re-elected general councillor in March 2004, this time winning 62.5% of the vote.

Rebsamen directed the Socialist Party's campaign for the March 2004 regional and cantonal elections, and in 2005 ran the campaign for a "Yes" vote in the French referendum on the Treaty establishing a Constitution for Europe. In June, then in August 2006, he asked Jack Lang and Dominique Strauss-Kahn to withdraw their candidacy for president of France, and explicitly supported Ségolène Royal, becoming co-director of her campaign, along with Jean-Louis Bianco.

Rebsamen was re-elected mayor of Dijon in the 2008 municipal election, winning 56.2% of the vote to François-Xavier Dugourd's 36.4%. His plan to build a tramway in Dijon was unanimously approved by the Greater Dijon Community Council on 15 May 2008.

From 2007 to 2008, Rebsamen was a director of Dexia-Crédit Local de France, resigning a few days before it went bankrupt.

=== Senator for Côte-d'Or, 2008–2014 ===
In the 2008 elections, Rebsamen became a Senator, the first Socialist to represent Côte-d'Or in the Senate since 1948, and then resigned as general councillor. In the Senate, he was a member of the Committee on Finance. Following the Senate elections of 25 September 2011, and the election of 1 October, Rebsamen was chosen to lead the Socialist group in the Senate.

In the Socialist Party's 2011 primary, Rebsamen endorsed François Hollande as the party's candidate ahead of the 2012 presidential election.

In 2012, Rebsamen opposed a government effort tried to prevent politicians from holding multiple posts, and said that if forced to choose between continuing as Senator or as mayor of Dijon he would opt for the latter.

Following the 2014 municipal election, Rebsamen was elected to his third term as mayor with 52.8% of the vote, defeating Alain Houpert (UMP).

=== Minister of Labour, 2014–2015 ===
On 2 April 2014, Rebsamen was appointed Minister of Labour, Employment and Social Dialogue in the government of Prime Minister Manuel Valls. This appointment led Rebsamen to resign from the mayorship of Dijon. Upon the appointment of the second Valls government, his ministerial portfolio was expanded to include vocational training. While at the Labour Ministry, he was nicknamed "Minister of Unemployment" owing to the high jobless rate characteristic of Hollande's presidency.

=== Return to local politics ===
On 30 July 2015, after the death of Alain Millot, who had succeeded him as mayor of Dijon, Rebsamen announced that he would run for the post again. On 10 August 2015, he was re-elected mayor and Grand Dijon (renamed Dijon Métropole in 2017) president, and a few days later he resigned his ministerial post. On 6 December 2016, he was offered the post of Minister of the Interior, but refused as he preferred to remain mayor of Dijon.

Ahead of the Socialist Party's 2018 convention in Aubervilliers, Rebsamen publicly endorsed Stéphane Le Foll as candidate for the party's leadership.

After being diagnosed with cancer, Rebsamen announced on 10 April 2018 that he would not be able to serve as mayor of Dijon and president of Dijon Métropole during his treatment, and thus appointed Nathalie Koenders as interim mayor and Pierre Pribetich as interim metropolis president.

Ahead of the 2022 presidential election, Rebsamen endorsed Emmanuel Macron and left the Socialist Party. In May 2022, he launched the Progressist Federation (Fédération progressiste, FP), a new centre-left party. The party joined the Ensemble coalition and saw two of its members – Christine Decodts in Nord and Benoît Bordat in Côte-d'Or – win a seat in the National Assembly in 2022, joining the Renaissance group.

=== Minister for Territorial Development, 2024–2025 ===
After having resigned as mayor of Dijon on 25 November 2024, Rebsamen was appointed Minister for Territorial Development and Decentralisation the following 23 December in the newly-formed government of Prime Minister François Bayrou, marking his return to national politics.

== Honours ==
- Officer of the Legion of Honour (2021)
