= Catherine Hervieu =

French politician (born 1958)

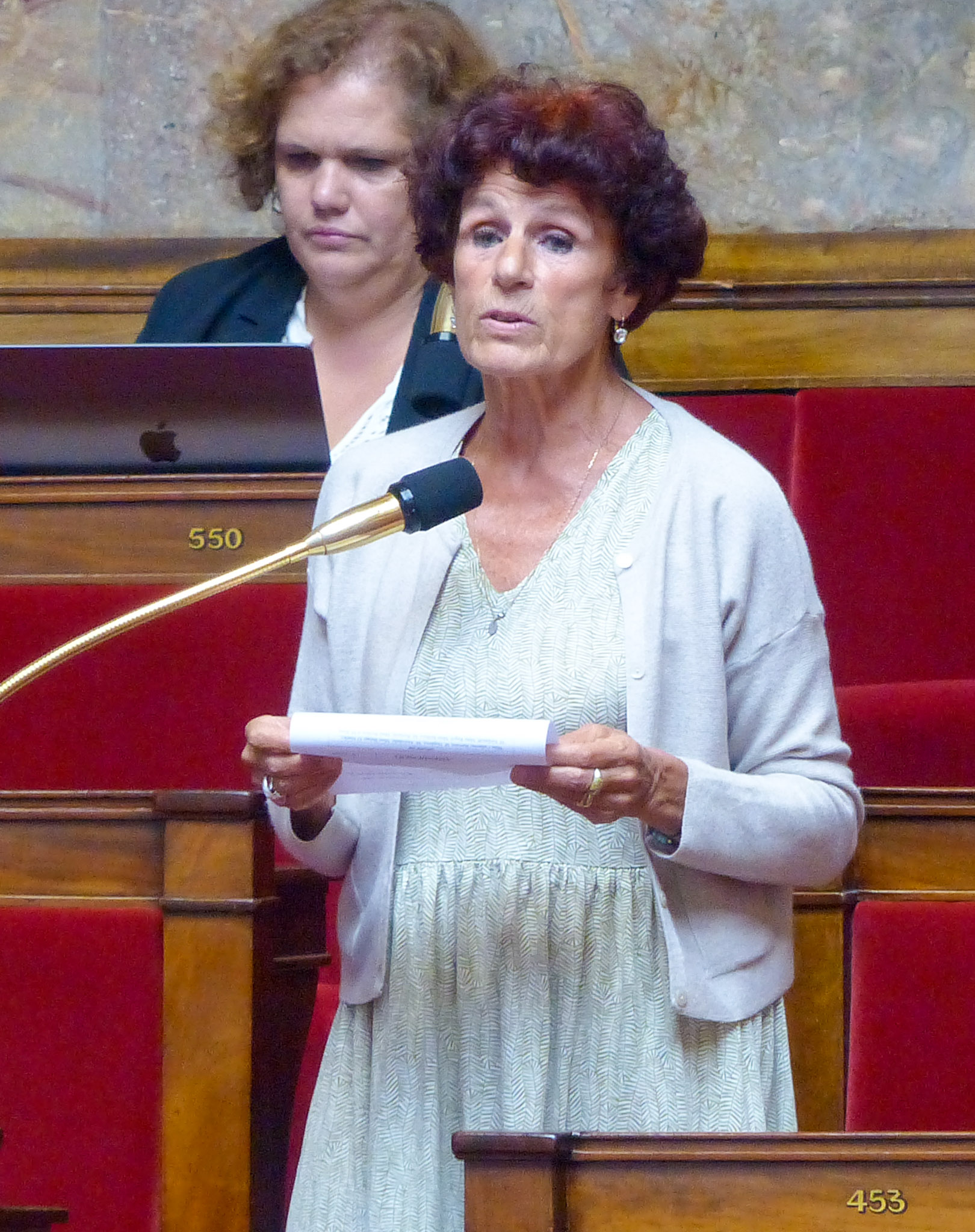
- Hervieu in 2025

Member of the National Assembly for Côte-d'Or's 2nd constituency
- Incumbent
- Assumed office 8 July 2024
- Preceded by: Benoît Bordat

Personal details
- Born: 9 May 1958 (age 68) Meknes, Morocco
- Party: The Ecologists
- Other political affiliations: The Greens (formerly)

Catherine Hervieu (French pronunciation: [katʁin ɛʁvjø]; born 9 May 1958) is a French politician of The Ecologists who has represented the 2nd constituency of Côte-d'Or in the National Assembly since 2024. She had run five times unsuccessfully for the seat until 2024. Hervieu has also been a member of the Departmental Council of Côte-d'Or for the canton of Dijon-3 since 2021. She started her career as a municipal councillor of Dijon (2001–2024).

== Biography ==
=== Early career ===
Hervieu was born in Morocco. Her family moved to Dijon when she was a child. She worked as a teacher then a school psychologist.

Alongside her political commitment, she is a member of several environmental associations. She is notably a director of France Nature Environnement in Côte-d'Or, president of Atmo Bourgogne Franche-Comté from 2017 to 2023 and then president of the Fédération Atmo France, which brings together approved French air quality monitoring associations.

=== Local politics ===
Catherine Hervieu entered politics in 1992 by joining The Greens. In 1997, she stood for her first election, after the dissolution of the National Assembly by Jacques Chirac. She was a substitute candidate in these legislative elections.

In 2001, she was elected a municipal councillor of Dijon on the list of the plural left of François Rebsamen. She was re-elected in 2008 and 2014. She became vice-president of Dijon Métropole in charge of the environment. In parallel with her mandates, she chaired the Federation of Green and Ecologist Elected Representatives (Feve).

As the 2020 municipal elections approached and while Hervieu was president of the EELV group in the municipal council, the Dijon ecologists unanimously chose to lead an independent list of Rebsamen. The activists chose Stéphanie Modde rather than Hervieu to lead the list, which remained in the second round against the mayor's list. She became an opposition municipal and metropolitan councillor. In 2024, following her election to the National Assembly, she resigned as a municipal councillor.

In 2021, she was a candidate in the departmental elections in the canton of Dijon-3, which includes the districts of Les Grésilles, Montmuzard and Joffre-Pouilly-Toison d'Or, in tandem with the outgoing socialist Hamid El Hassouni. The duo gathered 50.2% of the votes in the first round, but was not elected due to abstention. In the second round, Catherine Hervieu and Hamid El Hassouni were elected departmental councillors with 53.8% of the votes against a centrist duo.

Catherine Hervieu has run several times for the National Assembly in Côte-d'Or's 2nd constituency, a constituency that leaned to the right from 1988 to 2022. She was first a substitute in 1997 and then a Green Party candidate in 2002, 2007, 2012 and 2017. For the 2022 legislative election, while the outgoing The Republicans (LR) deputy Rémi Delatte did not stand again, she received the nomination of the New Ecological and Social People's Union. She came first in the first round, two points ahead of the Ensemble candidate Benoît Bordat, deputy mayor of Dijon and departmental councillor. She was beaten in the second round by Benoît Bordat, who received 51.7% of the vote and benefited in particular from the transfer of votes from the right.

=== National politics ===
Hervieu went back on the campaign trail ahead of the 2024 French legislative election, nominated by the New Popular Front alliance. In the first round, she received 27.67% of the vote, behind Tatiana Guyénot of the National Rally (34.64%) but ahead of the outgoing deputy (24.65%). Bordat initially announced that he would remain in the race for the triangular election, then withdrew "to beat the National Rally". In the second round, Hervieu was elected the deputy with 53.63% of the vote against Guyénot.

== National mandates ==
- 8 July 2024 – present: deputy for the 2nd constituency of Côte-d'Or

== Election results ==
=== Departmental elections ===
Year	Party	Constituency	1st round			2nd round		
Year	Party	Constituency	Votes	%	Rank	Votes	%	Issue
2021	DVG-EELV	Dijon-3	1,918	50.25	1st	2,129	53.83	Elected

=== Legislative elections ===
Year	Party	Constituency	1st round			2nd round		
Year	Party	Constituency	Votes	%	Rank	Votes	%	Issue
2002	Les Verts	Côte-d'Or's 2nd constituency	1,033	2.70	4th	Beaten in the first round		
2007	Les Verts	Côte-d'Or's 2nd constituency	1,379	3.55	5th	Beaten in the first round		
2012	EELV	Côte-d'Or's 2nd constituency	1,324	3.33	5th	Beaten in the first round		
2017	EELV	Côte-d'Or's 2nd constituency	1,518	4.36	6th	Beaten in the first round		
2022	NUPES-ECO	Côte-d'Or's 2nd constituency	10,115	29.26	1st	14,684	48.31	Beaten
2024	NFP-EELV	Côte-d'Or's 2nd constituency	13,723	27.67	2nd	24,496	53.63	Elected

== See also ==
- List of deputies of the 17th National Assembly of France
