= Côte-d'Or's 1st constituency =

Constituency of the National Assembly of France

1st constituency of the Cote-d'Or
- inline Constituency of the National Assembly of France

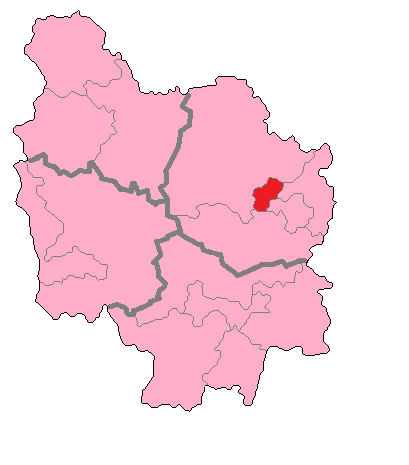
- Côte-d'Or's 1st Constituency shown within Burgundy
- Deputy: Océane Godard; PS
- Department: Côte-d'Or
- Cantons: Dijon-V, Dijon-VI, Dijon-VII, Fontaine-lès-Dijon.
- Registered voters: 67,637

The 1st constituency of the Côte-d'Or is a French legislative constituency in the Côte-d'Or département. Like the other 576 French constituencies, it elects one MP using the two-round system.

== Description ==
The 1st constituency of the Côte-d'Or is entirely urban and covers the west of Dijon along with its suburb of Fontaine-lès-Dijon,

== Historic Representation ==
Election	Member	Party
1986	Proportional representation – no election by constituency	
1988	Robert Poujade	RPR
1993	Robert Poujade	RPR
1997	Robert Poujade	RPR
2002	Bernard Depierre	UMP
2007	Bernard Depierre	UMP
2012	Laurent Grandguillaume	PS
2017	Didier Martin	LREM
2022	Didier Martin	LREM
2024	Océane Godard	PS

== Election results ==
=== 2024 ===
Candidate	Party	Alliance	First round			Second round		
Candidate	Party	Alliance	Votes	%	+/–	Votes	%	+/–
Océane Godard	PS	NFP	14,679	29.16	+3.53	18,716	37.15	-4.82
Didier Martin	REN	Ensemble	13,830	27.48	-3.68	17,314	34.36	-23.67
Cyline Humblot-Cornille	RN		14,356	28.49	+16.27	12,969	25.77	new
François-Xavier Dugourd	LR	UDC	6,126	12.17	-2.63			
Sladana Zivkovic	DVG		2,232	4.43				
Julien Thevenin	LO		497	0.99	+0.30			
Votes			50,333	100.00		50,386	100.00	
Valid votes			50,333	98.22	-0.31	50,386	97.34	+4.64
Blank votes			657	1.28	+0.16	1,081	2.09	-3.51
Null votes			255	0.50	+0.15	298	0.58	-1.12
Turnout			51,245	72.69	+18.89	51,765	73.41	+21.97
Abstentions			19,250	27.31	-18.89	18,746	26.59	-21.97
Registered voters			70,495			70,511		
Result			PS GAIN FROM RE					

=== 2022 ===
Legislative Election 2022: Côte-d'Or's 1st constituency
Party	Candidate	Votes	%	±%
LREM (Ensemble)	Didier Martin	11,622	31.16	-4.85
LFI (NUPÉS)	Antoine Peillon	9,558	25.63	+1.02
LR (UDC)	François-Xavier Dugourd	5,521	14.80	+3.86
RN	Grâce Jourdier	4,558	12.22	+2.74
PS	Sladana Zivkovic*	2,959	7.93	N/A
REC	Ambrine Mohamed	1,599	4.29	N/A
Others	N/A	1,482	-	−
Turnout		37,299	53.80	−1.55
2nd round result
LREM (Ensemble)	Didier Martin	19,473	58.03	+3.89
LFI (NUPÉS)	Antoine Peillon	14,085	41.97	N/A
Turnout		33,558	51.44	+4.77
LREM hold				

* Zivkovic stood as a PS dissident without the support of the party or the NUPES alliance.

=== 2017 ===
Candidate	Label	First round		Second round	
Candidate	Label	Votes	%	Votes	%
Didier Martin	REM	13,446	36.01	15,269	54.14
François-Xavier Dugourd	DVD	4,863	13.02	12,935	45.86
Anne Erschens	LR	4,084	10.94		
Arnaud Guvenatam	FI	3,991	10.69		
Isabelle Delyon	FN	3,539	9.48		
Sladana Zivkovic	PS	3,129	8.38		
Olivier Muller	ECO	1,540	4.12		
Marie Poinsel	PCF	530	1.42		
Ghislaine Fallet	DIV	530	1.42		
Christiane Estève	ECO	490	1.31		
Massar N'diaye	DVG	466	1.25		
Patrick Delezenne	DIV	217	0.58		
Christian Marchet	EXG	181	0.48		
Fatima Arji	DLF	122	0.33		
Delhia Havot	DVG	78	0.21		
Domitille de Bronac	DVD	78	0.21		
Yasmin Kaya	DIV	54	0.14		
Votes		37,338	100.00	28,204	100.00
Valid votes		37,338	98.53	28,204	88.27
Blank votes		412	1.09	2,913	9.12
Null votes		145	0.38	835	2.61
Turnout		37,895	55.35	31,952	46.67
Abstentions		30,574	44.65	36,511	53.33
Registered voters		68,469		68,463	
Source: Ministry of the Interior

=== 2012 ===
2012 legislative election in Cote-D'Or's 1st constituency
Candidate	Party	First round		Second round	
Candidate	Party	Votes	%	Votes	%
Laurent Grandguillaume	PS	16,907	39.95%	21,395	52.33%
Bernard Depierre	UMP	15,559	36.76%	19,489	47.67%
Vanessa Langlet	FN	4,891	11.56%		
Martine Lepeule	FG	1,733	4.09%		
Stéphanie Modde	EELV	1,549	3.66%		
Marien Lovichi	MoDem	1,027	2.43%		
Christiane Esteve	AEI	358	0.85%		
René Beancourt	POI	153	0.36%		
Christian Coste	LO	148	0.35%		
Valid votes		42,325	98.96%	40,884	97.51%
Spoilt and null votes		444	1.04%	1,043	2.49%
Votes cast / turnout		42,769	63.23%	41,927	61.99%
Abstentions		24,869	36.77%	25,710	38.01%
Registered voters		67,638	100.00%	67,637	100.00%

=== 2007 ===
Legislative Election 2007: Côte-d'Or's 1st constituency
Party	Candidate	Votes	%	±%
UMP	Bernard Depierre	20,502	48.17	
PS	Françoise Tenenbaum	11,803	27.73	
MoDem	Dominique Grimpret	3,693	8.68	
LV	Philippe Hervieu	1,554	3.65	
FN	Annie Robert	1,254	2.95	
EXG	Caroline Vigneron	1,026	2.41	
PCF	Najate Haie	949	2.23	
Others	N/A	1,782		
Turnout		43,016	63.99	
2nd round result
UMP	Bernard Depierre	22,393	55.44	
PS	Françoise Tenenbaum	18,000	44.56	
Turnout		41,524	61.77	
UMP hold				

=== 2002 ===
Legislative Election 2002: Côte-d'Or's 1st constituency
Party	Candidate	Votes	%	±%
PS	François Rebsamen	15,934	36.71	
UMP	Bernard Depierre	15,334	35.32	
FN	Stephanie Terrade	4,202	9.68	
DVD	Yves Japiot	2,991	6.89	
DVD	Jean-Pierre Favre	1,117	2.57	
Others	N/A	3,832		
Turnout		44,023	69.34	
2nd round result
UMP	Bernard Depierre	21,465	52.74	
PS	François Rebsamen	19,235	47.26	
Turnout		41,865	65.94	
UMP hold				

=== 1997 ===
Legislative Election 1997: Côte-d'Or's 1st constituency
Party	Candidate	Votes	%	±%
RPR	Robert Poujade	11,847	29.28	
PS	François Rebsamen	10,476	25.89	
FN	François Thieriot	6,212	15.35	
DVD	Yves Japiot	3,111	7.69	
LV	Christine Dunerin	1,894	4.68	
MPF	Dominique Thyebault	1,587	3.92	
PCF	Christine Porteret	1,540	3.81	
GE	Paul Zylberberg	865	2.14	
Others	N/A	2,925		
Turnout		42,046	67.44	
2nd round result
RPR	Robert Poujade	22,651	53.64	
PS	François Rebsamen	19,575	46.36	
Turnout		44,623	71.58	
RPR hold				

== Sources ==
Official results of French elections from 2002: "Résultats électoraux officiels en France" (in French).
