= Côte-d'Or's 2nd constituency =

Constituency of the National Assembly of France

2nd constituency of the Côte-d'Or
- inline Constituency of the National Assembly of France

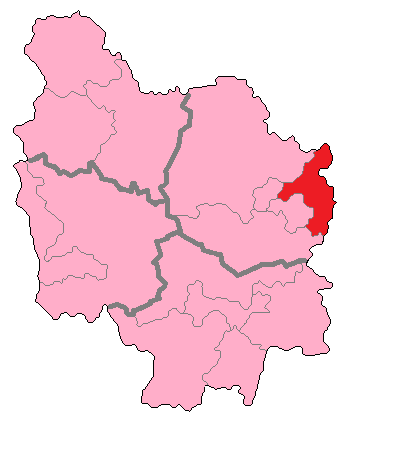
- Côte-d'Or's 2nd Constituency shown within Burgundy
- Deputy: Catherine Hervieu; LE
- Department: Côte-d'Or
- Cantons: Auxonne, Dijon-I, Dijon-III, Dijon-VIII, Fontaine-Française, Mirebeau, Pontailler-sur-Saône
- Registered voters: 66,189

The 2nd constituency of the Côte-d'Or is a French legislative constituency in the Côte-d'Or département. Like the other 576 French constituencies, it elects one MP using the two-round system.

== Description ==
Côte-d'Or's 2nd constituency covers the centre and east of Dijon as well as the rural areas to the east of the city.

The seat was held by Gaullist parties from 1988 to 2022, when it was won by LREM. The seat was taken by Jean-Marc Nudant in 1998 following the appointment of his predecessor Louis de Broissia to the Senate.

== Historic Representation ==
Election	Member	Party
1986	Proportional representation – no election by constituency	
1988	Louis de Broissia	RPR
1993	Louis de Broissia	RPR
1997	Louis de Broissia	RPR
1998	Jean-Marc Nudant	RPR
2002	Jean-Marc Nudant	UMP
2007	Rémi Delatte	UMP
2012	Rémi Delatte	UMP
2017	Rémi Delatte	LR
2022	Benoît Bordat	LREM
2024	Catherine Hervieu	LE

== Election results ==
=== 2024 ===
Candidate	Party	Alliance	First round			Second round		
Candidate	Party	Alliance	Votes	%	+/–	Votes	%	+/–
Tatiana Guyenot	RN		17,181	34.64	+13.95	21,184	46.37	new
Catherine Hervieu	LE	NFP	13,723	27.67	-1.59	24,496	53.63	+5.32
Benoit Bordat	RE	Ensemble	12,225	24.65	-2.39	withdrew		
Laurent Bourguignat	LR	UDC	3,982	8.03	-3.40			
Julien Gonzalez	DIV		1,222	2.46	new			
Claire Rocher	LO		522	1.05	-0.66			
Franck Gaillard	REC		512	1.03	-3.78			
Elisabeth Bertrand	DSV		231	0.47	-1.07			
Votes			49,598	100.00		45,680	100.00	
Valid votes			49,598	97.99	+0.19	45,680	90.66	+0.17
Blank votes			767	1.52	-0.20	3,758	7.46	+0.63
Null votes			248	0.49	=	949	1.88	-0.80
Turnout			50,613	70.29	+20.86	50,387	69.95	+22.97
Abstentions			21,398	29.71	-20.86	21,645	30.05	-22.97
Registered voters			72,011			72,032		
Result			LE GAIN FROM RE					

=== 2022 ===
Legislative Election 2022: Côte-d'Or's 2nd constituency
Party	Candidate	Votes	%	±%
EELV (NUPÉS)	Catherine Hervieu	10,115	29.26	+6.56
LREM (Ensemble)	Benoît Bordat	9,347	27.04	-5.53
RN	Mélanie Fortier	7,151	20.69	+7.32
LR (UDC)	Adrien Huguet	3,952	11.43	−14.30
REC	Franck Gaillard	1,662	4.81	N/A
LR	Bruno David*	1,217	3.52	N/A
Others	N/A	1,122	-	−
Turnout		34,566	49.43	−2.07
2nd round result
LREM (Ensemble)	Benoît Bordat	15,714	51.69	+4.13
EELV (NUPÉS)	Catherine Hervieu	14,684	48.31	N/A
Turnout		30,398	46.98	+2.71
LREM gain from LR				

* David stood as an LR dissident without the support of the party or the UDC alliance.

=== 2017 ===
Candidate	Label	First round		Second round	
Candidate	Label	Votes	%	Votes	%
François Deseille	REM	11,341	32.57	13,017	47.56
Rémi Delatte	LR	8,959	25.73	14,352	52.44
Franck Gaillard	FN	4,654	13.37		
Patricia Marc	FI	3,743	10.75		
Pierre Pribetich	PS	1,995	5.73		
Catherine Hervieu	ECO	1,518	4.36		
Éric Copie	DVD	849	2.44		
Tata Ouarag	PCF	647	1.86		
Christine Grandjean	ECO	449	1.29		
Delphine Brayard	DIV	234	0.67		
Claire Rocher	EXG	232	0.67		
Fabrice Gruet	DLF	195	0.56		
Votes		34,816	100.00	27,369	100.00
Valid votes		34,816	98.30	27,369	89.90
Blank votes		440	1.24	2,327	7.64
Null votes		162	0.46	748	2.46
Turnout		35,418	51.50	30,444	44.27
Abstentions		33,353	48.50	38,327	55.73
Registered voters		68,771		68,771	
Source: Ministry of the Interior

=== 2012 ===
2012 legislative election in Cote-D'Or's 2nd constituency
Candidate	Party	First round		Second round	
Candidate	Party	Votes	%	Votes	%
Rémi Delatte	UMP	14,813	37.29%	19,935	52.00%
Pierre Pribetich	PS	13,885	34.96%	18,400	48.00%
Stéphane Bouvier	FN	5,850	14.73%		
Najate Haie	FG	1,971	4.96%		
Catherine Hervieu	EELV	1,324	3.33%		
Pierre-Louis Monteiro	MoDem	992	2.50%		
Patrick Muller	AEI	278	0.70%		
Gérald Schwartzmann	PP	226	0.57%		
Claire Rocher	LO	202	0.51%		
Camille Perrin	NPA	180	0.45%		
Valid votes		39,721	98.94%	38,335	97.46%
Spoilt and null votes		425	1.06%	998	2.54%
Votes cast / turnout		40,146	60.66%	39,333	59.43%
Abstentions		26,040	39.34%	26,852	40.57%
Registered voters		66,186	100.00%	66,185	100.00%

=== 2007 ===
Legislative Election 2007: Côte-d'Or's 2nd constituency
Party	Candidate	Votes	%	±%
UMP	Rémi Delatte	19,108	49.16	
PS	Colette Popard	10,681	27.48	
MoDem	François Trouwborst	2,820	7.26	
FN	Brigitte Gomez-Flammant	1,662	4.28	
LV	Catherine Hervieu	1,379	3.55	
EXG	Christophe Cailleaux	816	2.10	
Others	N/A	2,400	-	
Turnout		39,422	61.11	
2nd round result
UMP	Rémi Delatte	22,031	57.52	
PS	Colette Popard	16,269	42.48	
Turnout		39,297	60.92	
UMP hold				

=== 2002 ===
Legislative Election 2002: Côte-d'Or's 2nd constituency
Party	Candidate	Votes	%	±%
UMP	Jean-Marc Nudant	16,317	42.67	
PS	Colette Popard	12,219	31.95	
FN	Franck Gaillard	4,899	12.81	
LV	Catherine Hervieu	1,033	2.70	
DLC	Daniel Skowron	895	2.34	
Others	N/A	2,881	-	
Turnout		38,882	66.45	
2nd round result
UMP	Jean-Marc Nudant	19,511	56.78	
PS	Colette Popard	14,851	43.22	
Turnout		35,856	61.27	
UMP hold				

=== 1997 ===
Legislative Election 1997: Côte-d'Or's 2nd constituency
Party	Candidate	Votes	%	±%
RPR	Louis de Broissia	12,282	33.79	
PS	Colette Popard	9,210	25.34	
FN	Liliane Floiras	7,168	19.72	
PCF	Michel Julien	1,878	5.17	
DVD	Philippe Colas	1,220	3.36	
LV	Michel Pipon	1,041	2.86	
LO	Jacqueline Lambert	887	2.44	
GE	Anne Maheu	728	2.00	
Others	N/A	2,664	-	
Turnout		38,061	67.26	
2nd round result
RPR	Louis de Broissia	18,002	44.85	
PS	Colette Popard	16,862	42.01	
FN	Liliane Floiras	5,274	13.14	
Turnout		41,295	72.97	
RPR hold				

== Sources ==
Official results of French elections from 2002: "Résultats électoraux officiels en France" (in French).
