= Jean Veillet (1901–1985) =

French physician

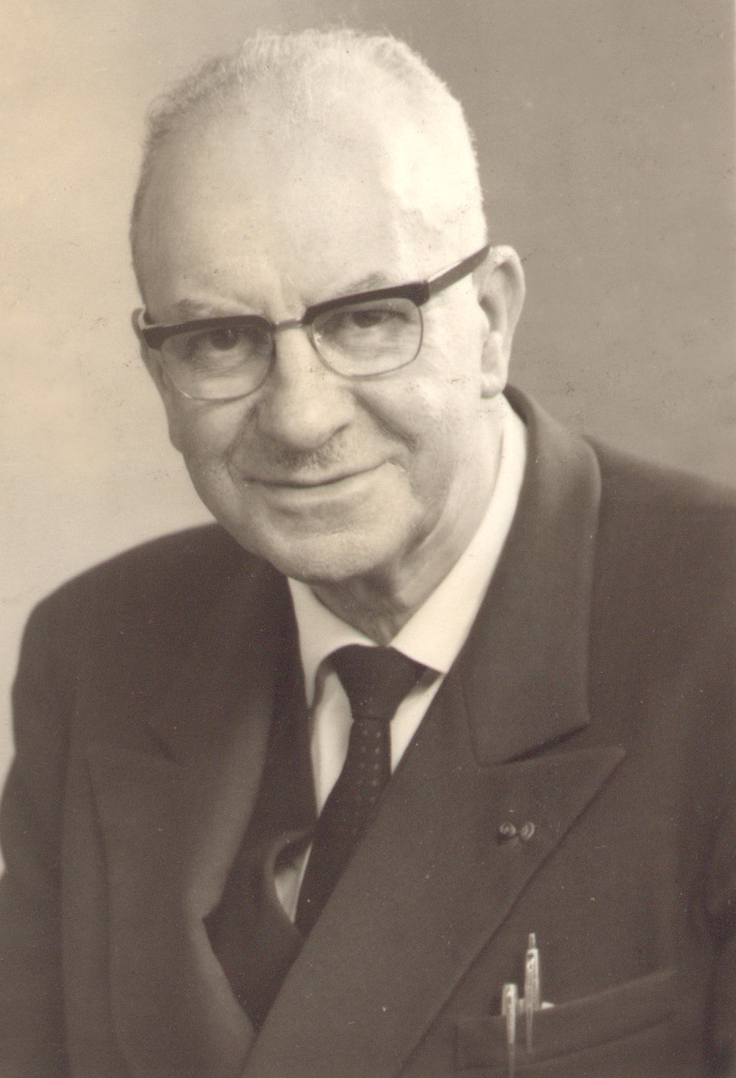

Mayor of Dijon
- In office 1968–1971
- Preceded by: Félix Kir
- Succeeded by: Robert Poujade

Personal details
- Born: 14 March 1901 Dijon, France
- Died: 1985 (aged 84) Dijon, France
- Party: CNI
- Education: University of Lyon
- Profession: Physician

Jean Veillet (born 14 March 1901 in Dijon (Côte-d'Or) and died in 1985 in the same city) was a French doctor. French Resistance and local politician, he was mayor of Dijon and president of the Departmental Council of Côte-d'Or.

== Biography ==
Born in Dijon in 1901, Jean Veillet is a doctor of medicine in 1924, graduated from the Faculty of Lyon. Successively head of clinic, doctor of the hospitals then head of service, he is also in charge of course of therapeutic at the school of medicine from 1945 to 1964.

During the German-occupied Europe, he engages in the French Resistance as head of health services. He is then regional delegate of the National Council of the Resistance (CNR) as well as of the Committee of Social Works of Organizations of the Resistance (COSOR).

These responsibilities during the war led him to politics, along with his medical and hospital activities: in 1945, he joined the Côte-d'Or Departmental Council. President of the Departmental Commission, then of the Finance Committee, he became president of general council in 1966. In 1968, on the death of the famous canon Kir, deputy mayor of Dijon, Jean Veillet, then deputy, replaces him at the head of the town hall for a short period of three years. In 1971, not standing in the municipal elections, he left the place to the promising Robert Poujade, recent MP and occupying the new Ministry of Ecology, Development and Sustainable Development. Jean Veillet, however, continues to preside over the General Council until his withdrawal from politics in 1975.

During his tenure as mayor, the "Dr. Veillet" took on many health and social tasks, his favorite areas.

== Elective functions ==
- General Councilor of Côte-d'Or from 1945 to 1975
- President of the General Council of Côte-d'Or of 1966
