= Nathalie Koenders =

French politician (born 1977)

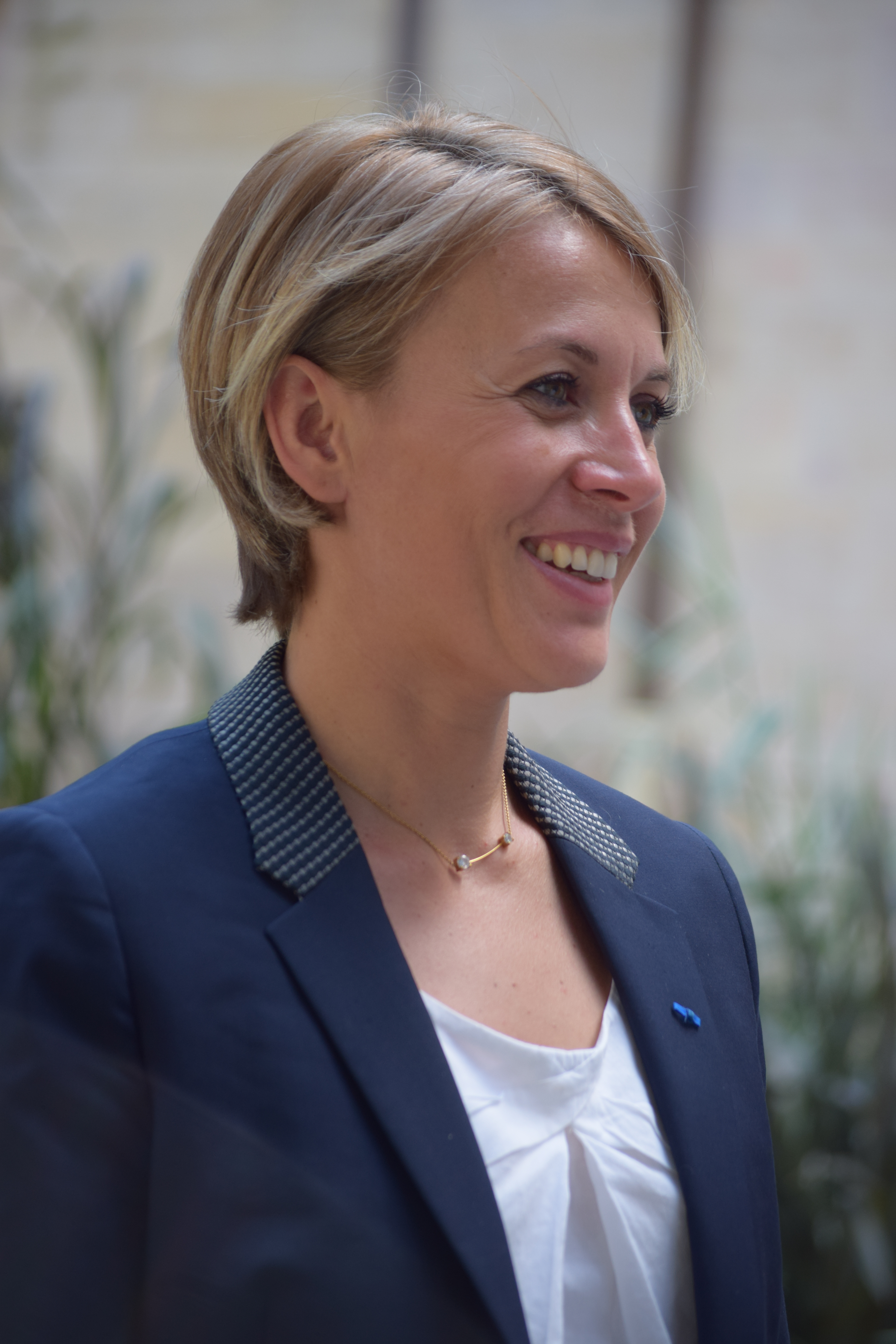
- Koenders in 2016

Mayor of Dijon
- Incumbent
- Assumed office 25 November 2024
- Preceded by: François Rebsamen
- Acting
- In office 27 July 2015 – 10 August 2015
- Preceded by: Alain Millot
- Succeeded by: François Rebsamen

Personal details
- Born: 1 March 1977 (age 49)
- Party: Socialist Party

Nathalie Koenders (born 1 March 1977) is a French politician of the Socialist Party serving as mayor of Dijon since 2024. She has been a member of the Departmental Council of Côte-d'Or since 2015 and served as acting mayor from July to August 2015.
