= Yolaine de Courson =

French politician (born 1954)

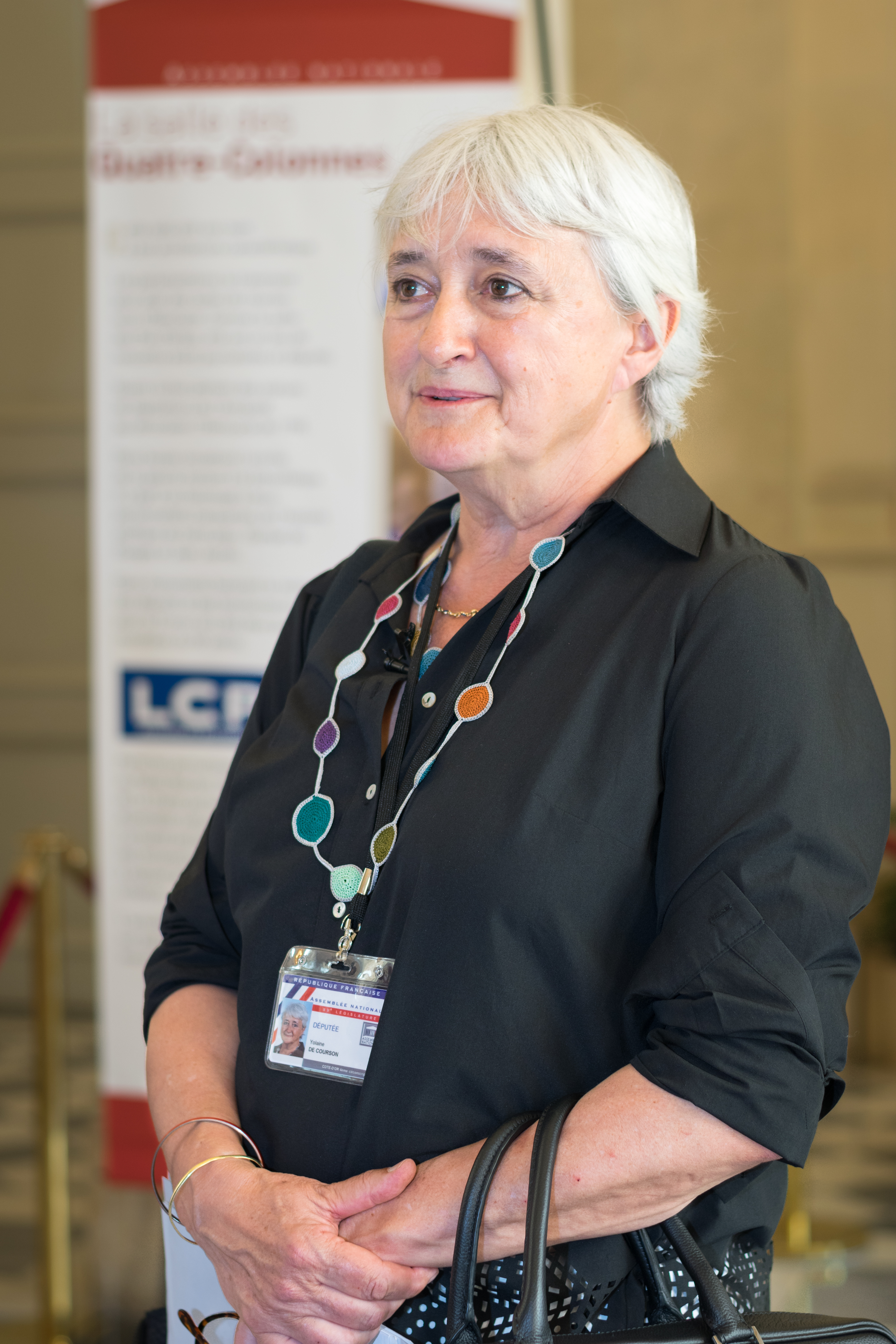
- Yolaine de Courson in 2017

Member of the National Assembly for Côte-d'Or's 4th constituency
- In office 21 June 2017 – 22 June 2022
- Preceded by: François Sauvadet
- Succeeded by: Hubert Brigand

Personal details
- Born: 14 July 1954 (age 72) Neuilly-sur-Seine, France
- Party: La République En Marche! (LREM) (2017-2020), Ecology Democracy Solidarity (EDS) (2020 onwards)
- Children: 2
- Education: Panthéon-Sorbonne University; University of Limoges

Yolaine de Courson (born 14 July 1954) is a French politician who served as a member of the French National Assembly from 2017 to 2022, representing the department of Côte-d'Or. She was elected as a member of La République En Marche!, but left the party and in May 2020, she was one of the 17 initial members who formed the short-lived Ecology Democracy Solidarity group.

== Political career ==
De Courson entered national politics at the age of 63, having previously retired from her career in business. In parliament, she served on the Committee on Sustainable Development and on the Committee on European Affairs. She was also a member of the parliamentary friendship groups with Spain and Iran. Since 2019, she has been a member of the French delegation to the Franco-German Parliamentary Assembly.

In addition to her committee assignments, de Courson was a member of the French delegation to the Parliamentary Assembly of the Council of Europe since 2017. In this capacity, she serves on the Committee on Social Affairs, Health and Sustainable Development; the Sub-Committee on Children; and the Sub-Committee on the European Social Charter.

De Courson lost her seat in the first round of the 2022 French legislative election, coming in fourth place.

== Political positions ==
In July 2019, de Courson decided not to align with her parliamentary group's majority and became one of 52 LREM members who abstained from a vote on the French ratification of the European Union’s Comprehensive Economic and Trade Agreement (CETA) with Canada.

== See also ==
- 2017 French legislative election
