= Kir Lake =

- Lac Kir (French)
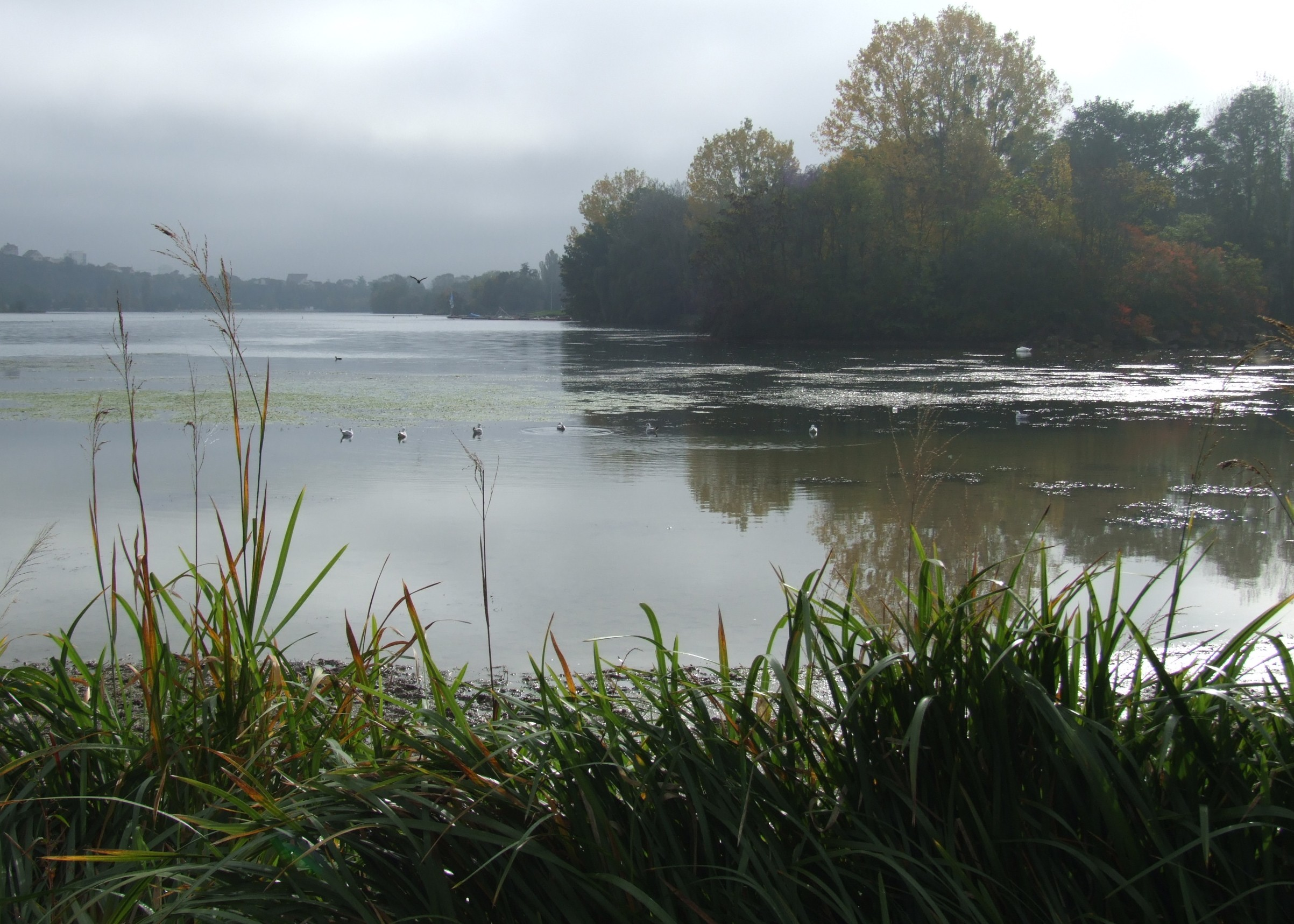
- View of the lake in 2006

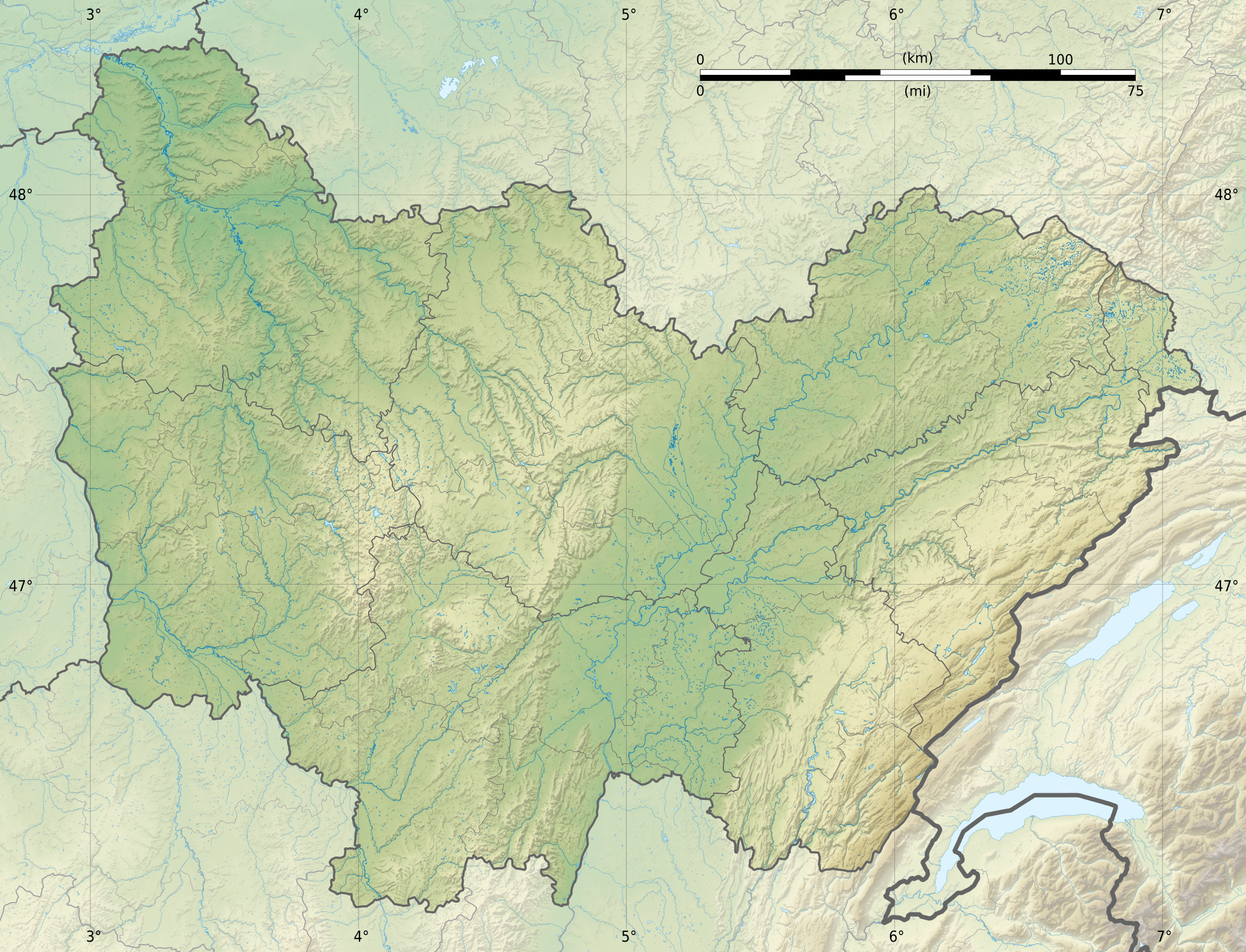
- Location within Bourgogne-Franche-Comté
- Location: Dijon, France
- Coordinates: 47°19′39″N 4°59′51″E
- Type: artificial lake

Kir Lake (French: Lac Kir) is an artificial lake located south west of Dijon, France. Traversed by the Ouche, it was completed in 1964 and named after Félix Kir (1876–1968), the mayor of Dijon and the lake's creator.

Kir Lake, also known as Lac Kir, is a man-made lake located in Dijon, the capital city of the Burgundy region in France. It was created in the 20th century by a local politician named Felix Kir, who had a vision of transforming the area into a recreational spot for the residents. The lake is fed by the Ouche River and covers an area of around 37 hectares. It has a scenic walking trail around its circumference and offers a variety of activities such as boating, fishing, and swimming. The area around Kir Lake is also known for its vineyards, making it a popular spot for wine tasting tours.
