= Océane Godard =

French politician (born 1982)

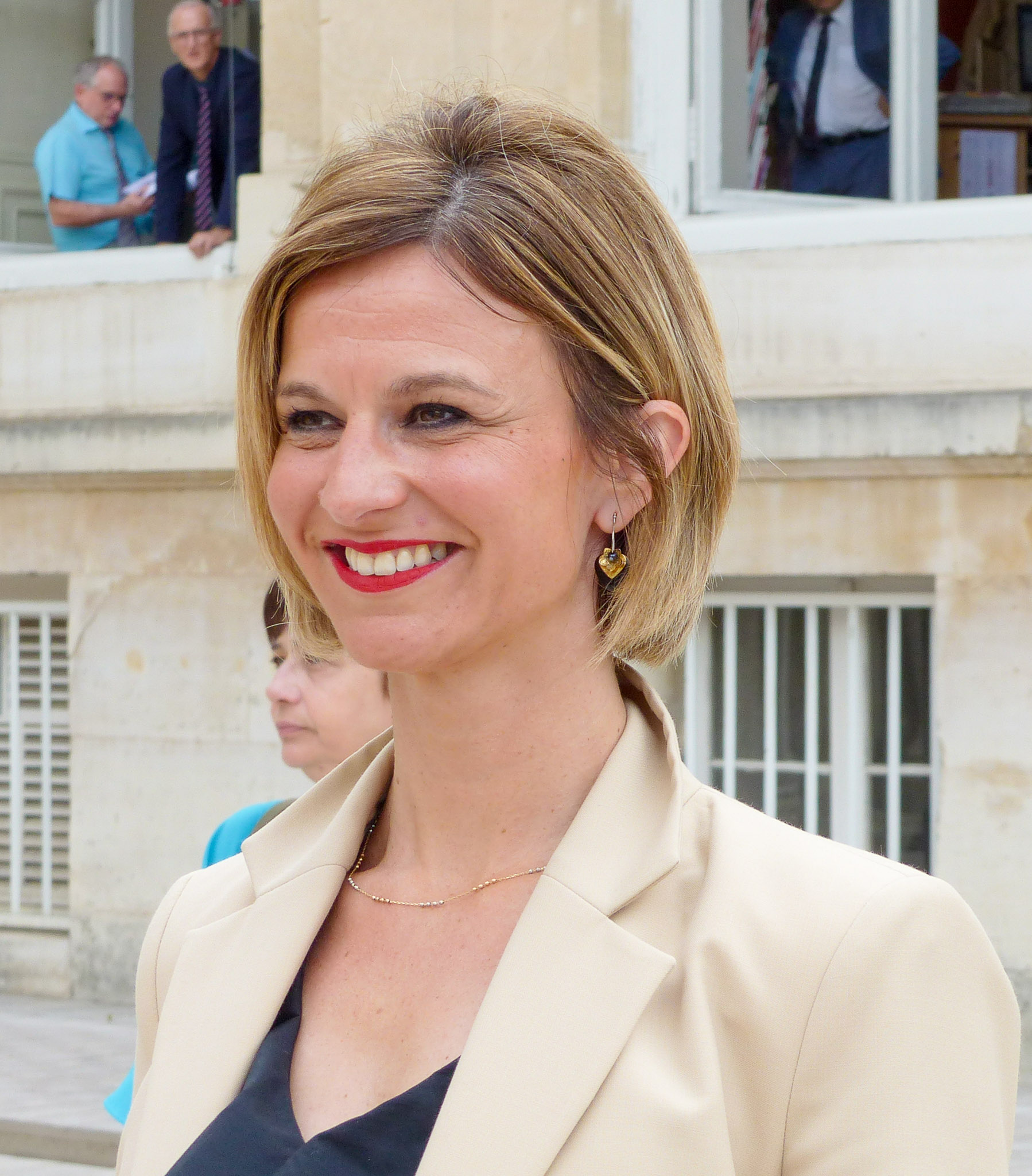
- Godard in 2024

Member of the French National Assembly for Côte-d'Or's 1st constituency
- Incumbent
- Assumed office 18 July 2024
- Preceded by: Didier Martin

Personal details
- Born: 22 November 1982 (age 43)
- Party: Socialist Party
- Other political affiliations: New Popular Front

Océane Godard (born 22 November 1982) is a French politician of the Socialist Party. In the 2024 legislative election, she was elected member of the National Assembly for Côte-d'Or's 1st constituency. She is a member of the Regional Council of Bourgogne-Franche-Comté, and previously served as a vice president of the council and as councillor of Dijon and Dijon Métropole.
