= Hubert Brigand =

French politician (born 1952)

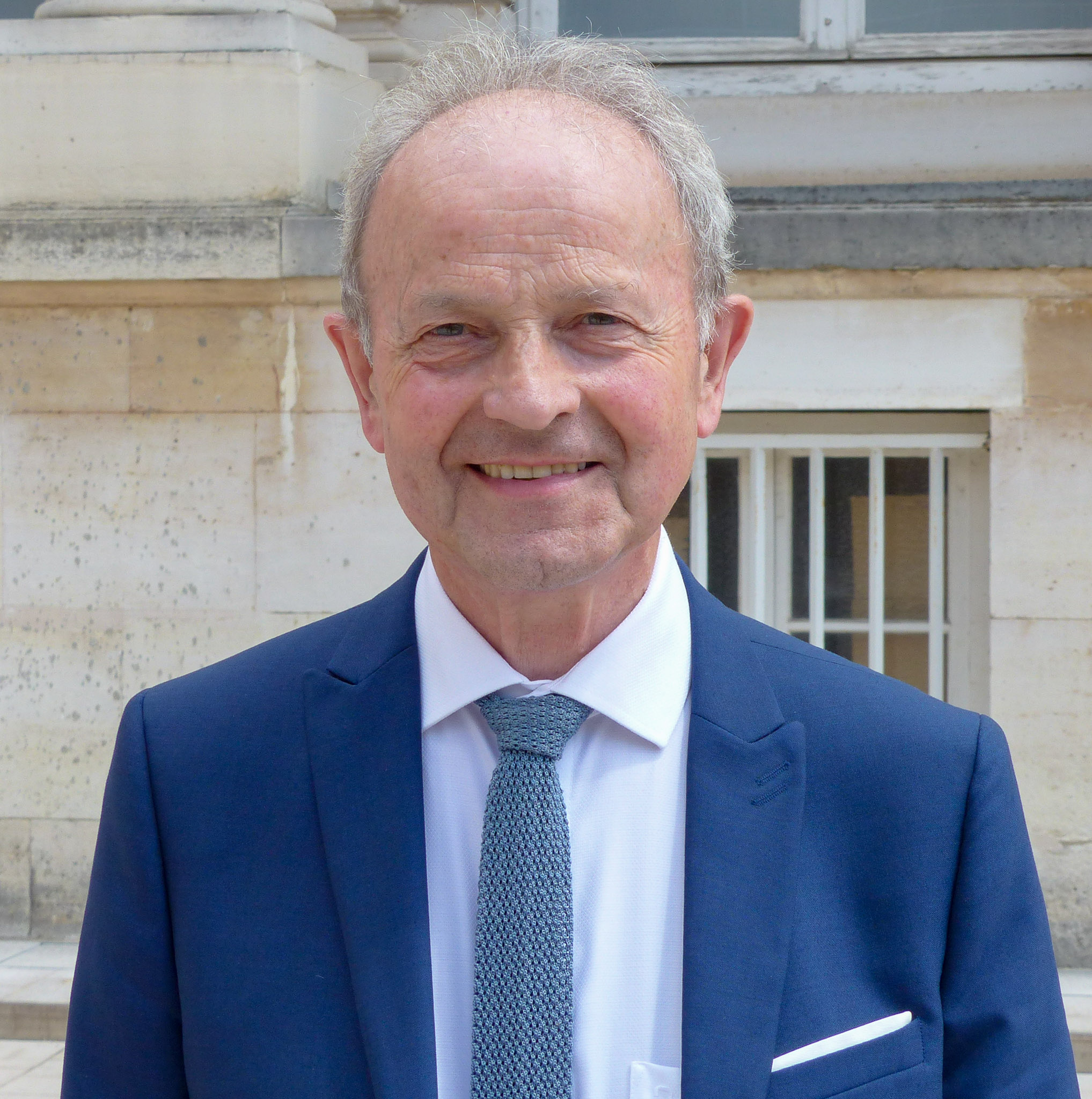

Member of the National Assembly for Côte-d'Or's 4th constituency
- Incumbent
- Assumed office 22 June 2022
- Preceded by: Yolaine de Courson

Mayor of Châtillon-sur-Seine
- In office 25 June 1995 – 7 September 2022
- Preceded by: Michel Serex
- Succeeded by: Roland Lemaire

Personal details
- Born: 28 July 1952 (age 74) Châtillon-sur-Seine, France
- Party: The Republicans

Hubert Brigand (French pronunciation: [ybɛʁ bʁiɡɑ̃]; born 28 July 1952) is a French politician who has represented the 4th constituency of Côte-d'Or in the National Assembly since 2022. A member of The Republicans (LR), he previously held a seat for the canton of Châtillon-sur-Seine in the Departmental Council of Côte-d'Or (1988–2022) and was mayor of Châtillon-sur-Seine (1995–2022).

== Political career ==
=== Local career ===
Brigand was mayor of Châtillon-sur-Seine for 27 years, from 1995 to 2022. The list he led won a majority in the first round in 2008 and 2014; in 2020 it was the only list presented in the election. He resigned as mayor following his election as a deputy in the 2022 legislative election and became first deputy mayor. His son Jérémie is also involved in politics; he was elected mayor of Châtillon-sur-Seine in 2026, after holding office as mayor of Massingy from 2008 to 2026.

Brigand was also elected to the Departmental Council of Côte-d'Or for the canton of Châtillon-sur-Seine from 1988 to 2022 and to the Regional Council of Burgundy from 1998 to 2004. He presided over the Pays Châtillonnais communauté de communes from 2011 to 2015, when he was succeeded by his son Jérémie, then the mayor of Massingy.

=== In the National Assembly ===
Brigand was an unsuccessful candidate in the 2017 legislative election in Côte-d'Or's 4th constituency, when he ran as a miscellaneous right candidate and placed third in the first round with 17.7% of the vote.

In 2022, this time with the support of The Republicans, he advanced to the second round and won with 60.6% of the vote against the National Rally candidate; incumbent deputy Yolaine de Courson of La République en Marche! who was seeking a second term placed fourth in the first round. In the second round, Brigand came out on top in 102 of the 107 communes in the constituency, where the local abstention rate of 48.81% was well below the national average.

In the National Assembly, he sits on the Committee on National Defence and the Armed Forces. In the 2024 snap election, he was reelected with 53.9% of the second-round vote against the National Rally candidate.
