= Benoît Bordat =

French politician (born 1984)

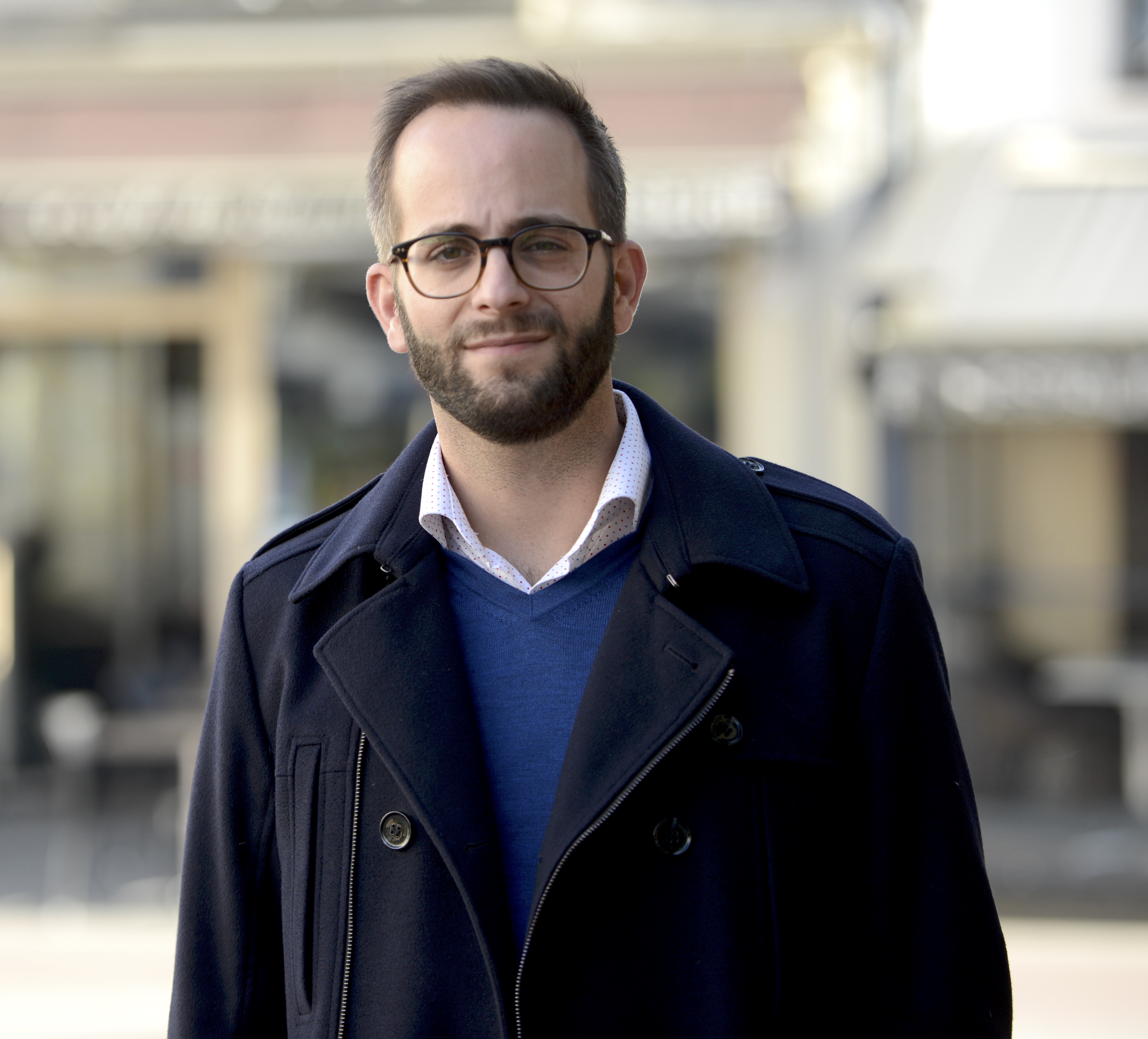
Image of Benoît Bordat

Benoît Bordat (born 7 February 1984) is a French politician. A member of Renaissance (RE), he was elected to the National Assembly in the 2022 French legislative election.

== Biography ==
Benoît Bordat was born in Chenôve, Côte-d'Or, on 7 February 1984. After finishing his primary studies in Marsannay-la-Côte, Bordat studied at the Institut des hautes études de droit rural et d'économie agricole (IHEDREA) and later received a Diplôme and a Master's degree in agricultural and real estate development. Bordat worked as a land development advisor to the Côte-d'Or Chamber of Agriculture.

As a member of Cap21 during the 2022 French presidential election, Bordat supported Yannick Jadot'scandidacy for president. Then, despite still not being a member of LREM, Bordat's candidacy was supported by François Rebsamen and his movement Fédération progressiste (FP) at the last moment. Bordat came within two percentage points of the top candidate in the first round of elections, and in the second round Bordat beat Catherine Hervieu, a green candidate who was part of the NUPES coalition with 51.69% of the vote.

In the 2024 French legislative election, he came in third place in a triangular election. Withdrawing for the second round, the seat was won by Ecologist candidate Catherine Hervieu.

== Previous political experience ==
- Assistant to the Mayor of Dijon from 2008. In charge of veterans, civic engagement, and national defense.
- Departmental Councilor of Côte-d'Or since 2021.
- Municipal councilor of Dijon, in charge of peri-urban agriculture and the revival of vineyards and vegetable farms.
