= Laurent Grandguillaume =

French politician

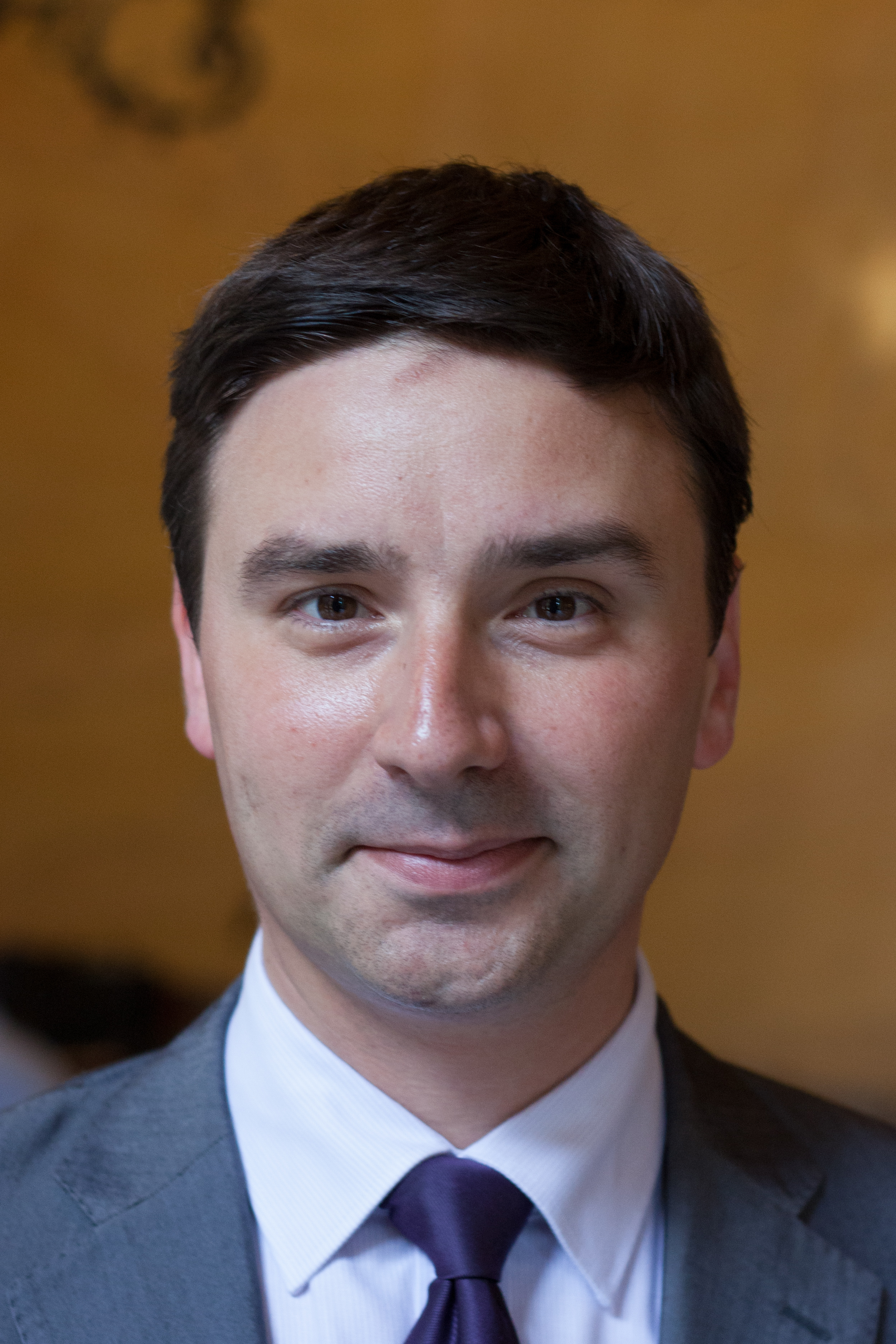

Member of the National Assembly for Côte-d'Or's 1st constituency
- In office 2012–2017
- Preceded by: Bernard Depierre
- Succeeded by: Didier Martin

Personal details
- Born: 20 January 1978 (age 48) Besançon, France
- Party: PS
- Education: University of Burgundy

Laurent Grandguillaume (born 20 January 1978) is a French politician. He served as a member of the National Assembly from 2012 to 2017, representing the 1st constituency of Côte-d'Or.
