= François Sauvadet =

French politician

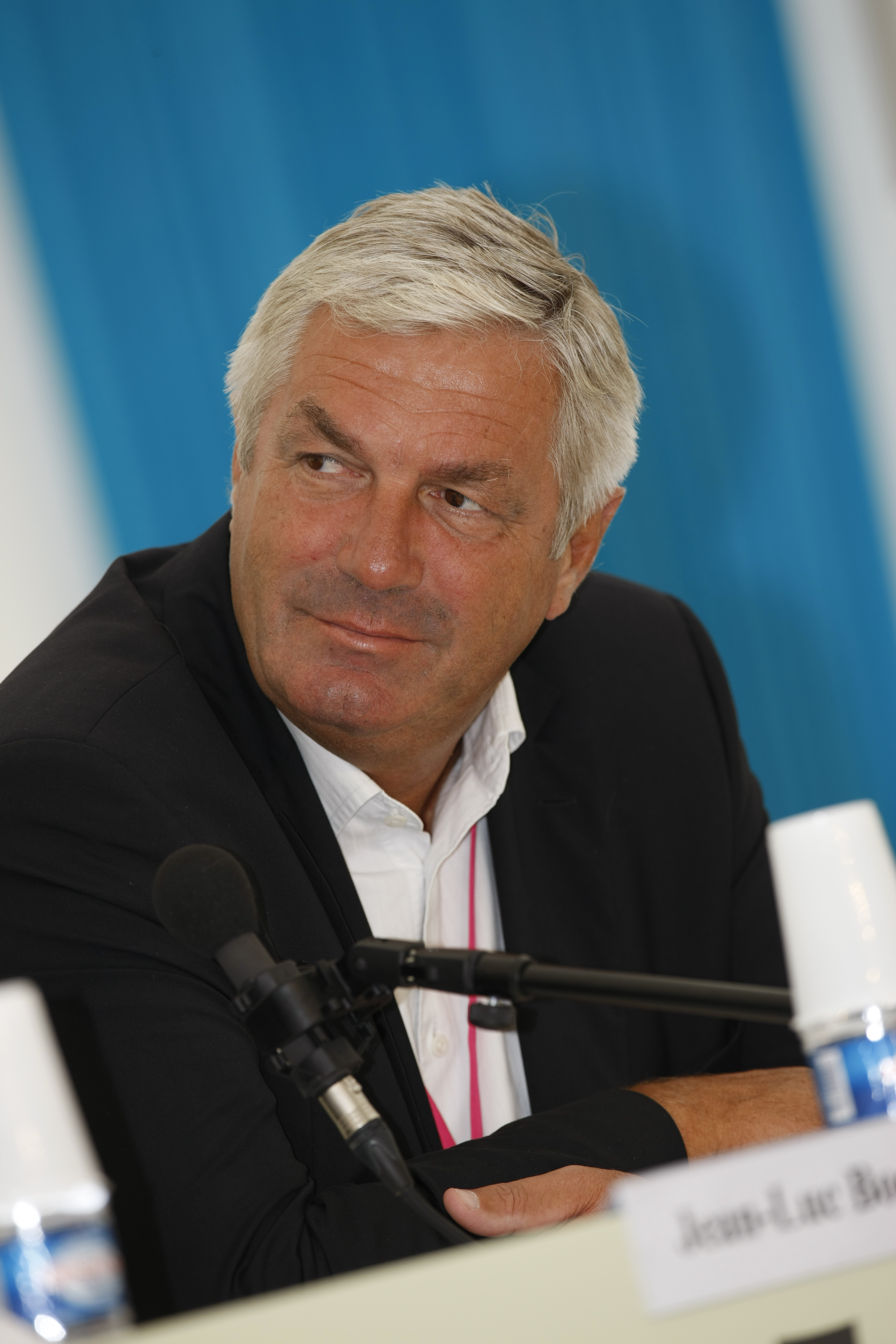

President of the Departmental Council of Côte-d'Or
- Incumbent
- Assumed office 20 March 2008
- Preceded by: Louis de Broissia

French Minister of Civil Service
- In office 2011–2012
- President: Nicolas Sarkozy
- Prime Minister: François Fillon
- Preceded by: François Baroin
- Succeeded by: Marylise Lebranchu

Deputy for Côte-d'Or's 4th constituency in the National Assembly of France
- In office 1993–2017
- Preceded by: Gilbert Mathieu
- Succeeded by: Yolaine de Courson

Personal details
- Born: 20 April 1953 (age 72) Dijon, France
- Party: UDI

François Sauvadet (born 20 April 1953) is a French journalist and politician of the Union of Democrats and Independents (UDI) who has been serving as the president of the Côte-d'Or department in eastern France since 2008.

== Early career ==
Sauvadet worked as a journalist at regional daily newspaper Le Bien Public from 1977 until 1993.

== Political career ==
Sauvadet represented Côte-d'Or's 4th constituency in the French National Assembly from 1993 to 2016, when he resigned to focus on activities in regional politics.

Over the course of his career in national politics, Sauvadet served as the chair of the New Centre's parliamentary group from 2007 to 2011 and as Minister for the Civil Service in the government of Prime Minister François Fillon from 2011 to 2012. Ahead of the 2012 French presidential election, he endorsed Nicolas Sarkozy as the center-right parties' joint candidate. In 2012, he was one of the founders of the Union of Democrats and Independents (UDI). On 27 July 2021 he was elected head of the Assemblée des départements de France.
