= Côte-d'Or's 4th constituency =

Constituency of the National Assembly of France

4th Constituency of the Côte-d'Or
- inline Constituency of the National Assembly of France

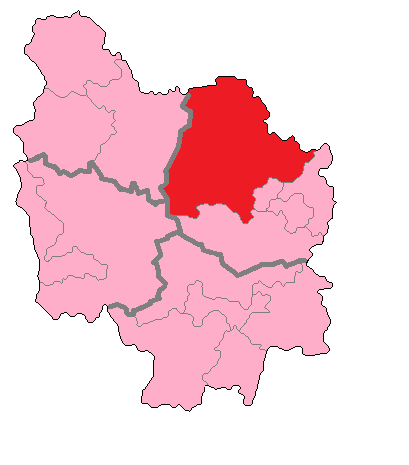
- Côte-d'Or's 4th Constituency shown within Burgundy
- Deputy: Hubert Brigand; LR
- Department: Côte-d'Or
- Cantons: Aignay-le-Duc, Baigneux-les-Juifs, Châtillon-sur-Seine, Grancey-le-Château-Neuvelle, Is-sur-Tille, Laignes, Montbard, Montigny-sur-Aube, Précy-sous-Thil, Recey-sur-Ource, Saint-Seine-l'Abbaye, Saulieu, Selongey, Semur-en-Auxois, Sombernon, Venarey-les-Laumes, Vitteaux.
- Registered voters: 69,194

The 4th constituency of the Côte-d'Or is a French legislative constituency in the Côte-d'Or département. Like the other 576 French constituencies, it elects one MP using the two-round system.

== Description ==
Côte-d'Or's 4th constituency is a large rural seat covering the north of the department. Historically it has supported the non-Gaullist conservative Union for French Democracy. In 2007 when the UDF split its existing representative François Sauvadet joined the newly formed New Centre in preference to the more centrist Democratic Movement (France).

== Historic Representation ==
Election	Member	Party
1986	Proportional representation – no election by constituency	
1988	Gilbert Mathieu	UDF
1993	François Sauvadet	UDF
1997	François Sauvadet	UDF
2002	François Sauvadet	UDF
2007	François Sauvadet	NC
2012	François Sauvadet	NC
2017	Yolaine de Courson	LREM
2020	Yolaine de Courson	EDS
2021	Yolaine de Courson	MoDem
2022	Hubert Brigand	LR
2024	Hubert Brigand	LR

== Election results ==
=== 2024 ===
Candidate	Party	Alliance	First round			Second round		
Candidate	Party	Alliance	Votes	%	+/–	Votes	%	+/–
Sophie Dumont	RN		19,881	42.33	+21.19	21,480	46.04	+6.85
Hubert Brigand	LR	UDC	16,531	35.20	+16.99	25,179	53.96	-6.85
Valérie Jacq	LFI	NFP	9,616	20.47	+2.84	withdrew		
Michel Denizot	LO		940	2.00	+1.10			
Votes			46,968	100.00		46,659	100.00	
Valid votes			46,968	96.99	-1.03	46,659	95.62	+4.83
Blank votes			1,083	2.24	+0.74	1,665	3.41	-3.65
Null votes			374	0.77	+0.30	474	0.97	-1.18
Turnout			48,425	71.80	+17.25	48,798	72.34	+21.15
Abstentions			19,022	28.20	-17.25	18,654	27.66	-21.15
Registered voters			67,447			67,452		
Result			LR HOLD					

=== 2022 ===
Legislative Election 2022: Côte-d'Or's 4th constituency
Party	Candidate	Votes	%	±%
RN	Jean-Marc Ponelle	7,733	21.14	+7.39
LR (UDC)	Hubert Brigand	6,661	18.21	+0.42
LFI (NUPÉS)	Stéphane Guinot	6,447	17.63	+4.45
MoDem (Ensemble)	Yolaine de Courson	5,868	16.04	−9.82
HOR	Laurence Porte*	4,371	11.95	N/A
PRG	Patrick Molinoz	2,539	6.94	−1.25
REC	Loup Bommier	1,736	4.75	N/A
Others	N/A	1,219	-	−
Turnout		36,574	54.55	−0.22
2nd round result
LR (UDC)	Hubert Brigand	19,332	60.81	+12.10
RN	Jean-Marc Ponelle	12,459	39.19	N/A
Turnout		31,791	51.19	+3.58
LR gain from LREM				

* Porte ran as a dissident Horizons member, without the support of the party or the Ensemble alliance.

=== 2017 ===
Candidate	Label	First round		Second round	
Candidate	Label	Votes	%	Votes	%
Yolaine de Courson	REM	9,521	25.86	14,414	51.29
Charles Barrière	LR	6,548	17.79	13,690	48.71
Hubert Brigand	DVD	6,516	17.70		
Sylvie Beaulieu	FN	5,062	13.75		
Stéphane Guinot	FI	3,423	9.30		
Patrick Molinoz	PRG	3,016	8.19		
Jean Baloutch	ECO	914	2.48		
Danielle Gutierrez	PCF	515	1.40		
Didier Coulichet	ECO	412	1.12		
Michel Denizot	EXG	282	0.77		
Killian Gorin	DIV	234	0.64		
Sandra Wagner	DIV	200	0.54		
Sébastien Rousset	DLF	123	0.33		
Élie Tarterat	DVG	46	0.12		
Votes		36,812	100.00	28,104	100.00
Valid votes		36,812	97.79	28,104	85.92
Blank votes		605	1.61	3,288	10.05
Null votes		228	0.61	1,319	4.03
Turnout		37,645	54.77	32,711	47.61
Abstentions		31,087	45.23	35,994	52.39
Registered voters		68,732		68,705	
Source: Ministry of the Interior

=== 2012 ===
2012 legislative election in Cote-D'Or's 4th constituency
Candidate	Party	First round		Second round	
Candidate	Party	Votes	%	Votes	%
François Sauvadet	NC	19,180	43.51%	22,891	53.03%
Patrick Molinoz	PRG	15,381	34.89%	20,372	47.20%
Gérald Buffy	FN	5,269	11.95%		
Eric Comparot	FG	2,143	4.86%		
Salomé François-Wilser	EELV	698	1.58%		
Isabelle Maire Du Poset	DLR	409	0.93%		
Roland Essayan	AEI	257	0.58%		
Michel Denizot	LO	196	0.44%		
Luc Martin	EXG	196	0.44%		
Laura Sabatier	MPF	194	0.44%		
Edouard Gnininvi	SP	162	0.37%		
Valid votes		44,085	98.57%	43,163	96.77%
Spoilt and null votes		638	1.43%	1,439	3.23%
Votes cast / turnout		44,723	64.77%	44,603	64.61%
Abstentions		24,321	35.23%	24,435	35.39%
Registered voters		69,044	100.00%	69,038	100.00%

=== 2007 ===
Legislative Election 2007: Côte-d'Or's 4th constituency
Party	Candidate	Votes	%	±%
NM	François Sauvadet	22,390	52.14	N/A
PRG	Patrick Molinoz	11,786	27.44	+1.33
FN	Annie Lacombe	1,977	4.60	−7.31
LCR	Marie Saucourt	1,235	2.88	+0.60
LV	Jean-Pierre Duplus	1,080	2.51	+0.12
PCF	Jean-Yves Robe	978	2.28	N/A
Others	N/A	3,499	-	−
Turnout		44,049	63.36	−3.58
NM hold				

=== 2002 ===
Legislative Election 2002: Côte-d'Or's 4th constituency
Party	Candidate	Votes	%	±%
UDF	François Sauvadet	22,498	50.12	+10.15
PRG	Patrick Molinoz	11,721	26.11	N/A
FN	Marie-Claude Leconte	5,346	11.91	−3.70
LV	Colette Deforeit	1,071	2.39	−1.36
LCR	Thierry Desanti	1,022	2.28	+1.26
Others	N/A	3,234	-	−
Turnout		45,827	66.94	−3.60
UDF hold				

=== 1997 ===
Legislative Election 1997: Côte-d'Or's 4th constituency
Party	Candidate	Votes	%	±%
PR (UDF)	François Sauvadet	18,013	39.97	
PS	Michel Neugnot	11,859	26.32	
FN	Jean-Pierre Pellan	7,034	15.61	
PCF	Robert Fourgeux	2,854	6.33	
LV	Bruno Diano	1,689	3.75	
LO	Christian Marchet	1,258	2.79	
DIV	Angelo Diano	1,027	2.28	
MEI	Odette Quinquer	871	1.93	
LCR	Thierry Desanti	458	1.02	
Turnout		47,335	70.54	
2nd round result
PR (UDF)	François Sauvadet	25,049	53.60	
PS	Michel Neugnot	21,686	46.40	
Turnout		49,528	73.81	
PR hold				
