= Rémi Delatte =

French politician

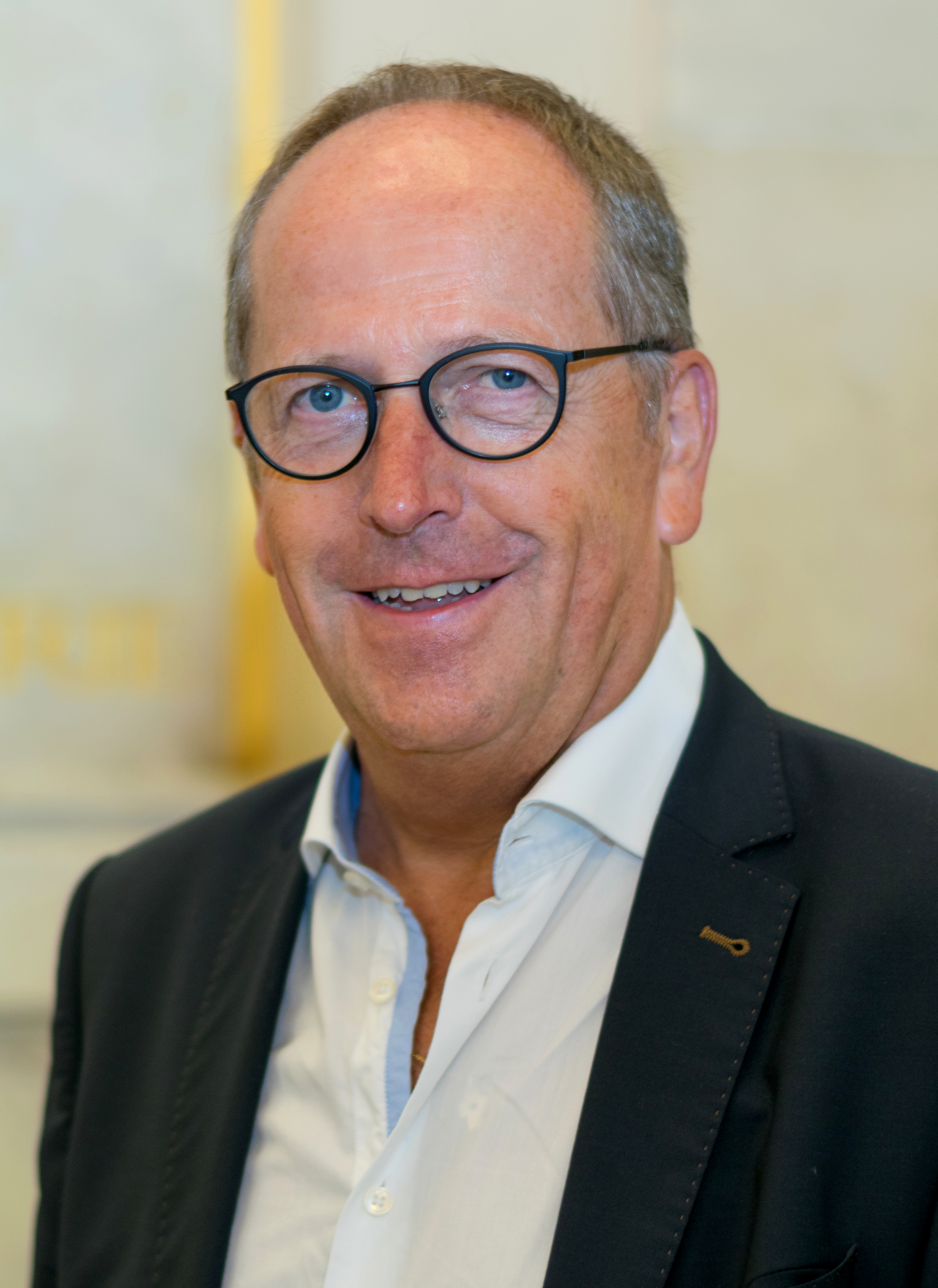
- Rémi Delatte in 2017

Member of the National Assembly for Côte-d'Or's 2nd constituency
- Incumbent
- Assumed office 20 June 2007
- Preceded by: Jean-Marc Nudant

Personal details
- Born: 9 June 1956 (age 69) Dijon, France
- Political party: UMP; The Republicans
- Profession: Farmer

Rémi Delatte (born 9 June 1956 in Dijon) is a French politician of the Republicans who currently serves as a member of the National Assembly of France, representing the Côte-d'Or department.

In the Republicans’ 2016 presidential primaries, Delatte endorsed François Fillon as the party's candidate for the office of President of France.

On 4 May 2022 he announced that he would be standing down at the 2022 French legislative election.
