= Brest Congress =

French politic

The Brest Congress was the eighteenth national congress of the French Socialist Party (Parti socialiste or PS). It took place from November 21 to 23, 1997.

== Results ==
Popular vote
Hollande Motion	84.07%
Socialist Left	10.21%
Poperénists	5.43%

François Hollande was elected as First Secretary, defeating Jean-Luc Mélenchon.
