= Robert Poujade =

French politician (1928–2020)

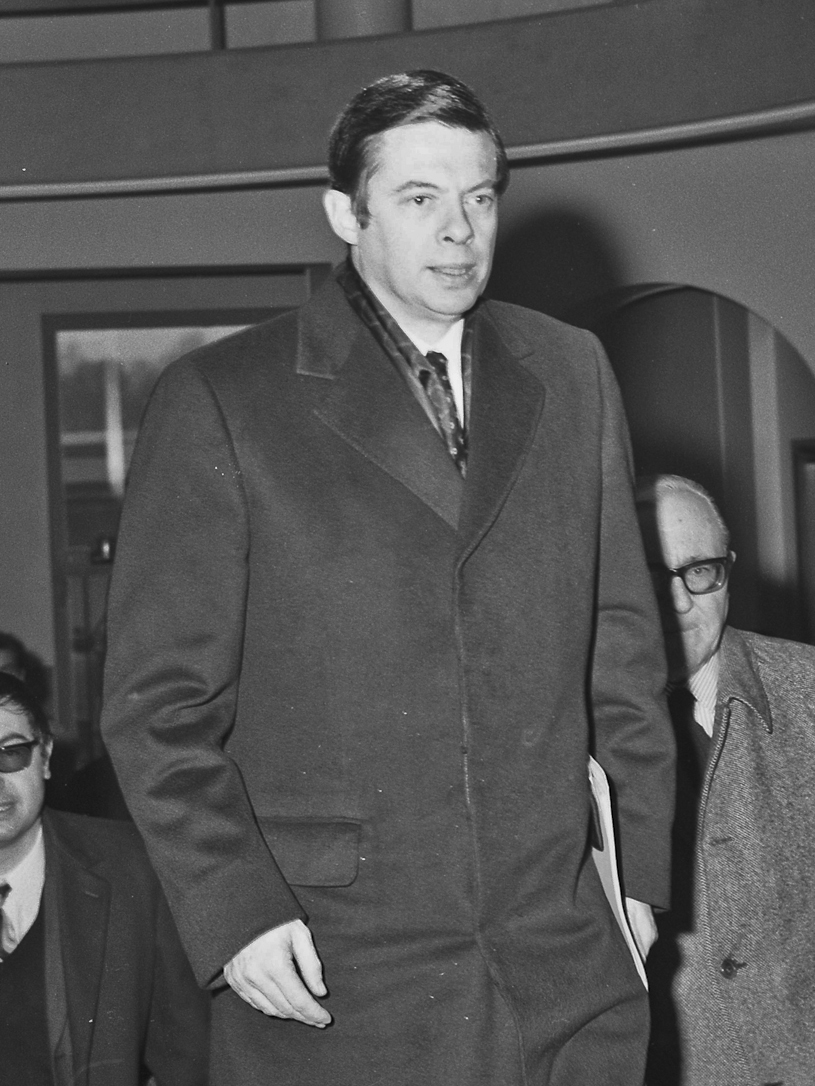

Mayor of Dijon
- In office 25 March 1971 – 25 March 2001
- Preceded by: Jean Veillet
- Succeeded by: François Rebsamen

Minister of Ecology
- In office 7 January 1971 – 1 March 1974
- President: Georges Pompidou
- Prime Minister: Jacques Chaban-Delmas; Pierre Messmer
- Succeeded by: Alain Peyrefitte

Personal details
- Born: Robert Léon Jean Poujade; 6 May 1928 Moulins, France
- Died: 8 April 2020 (aged 91) Paris, France
- Party: RPR
- Education: École Normale Supérieure

Robert Poujade (French pronunciation: [ʁɔbɛʁ puʒad]; 6 May 1928 – 8 April 2020), born in Moulins, Allier, was a French politician. He was the first French Minister of the Environment and was mayor of Dijon from 1971 to 2001.

== Biography ==
The son of a professor of literature, Poujade became a teacher in literature after having studied at the École normale supérieure.

Initially politically active for environmental causes, and a member in the successive Gaullist parties (RPF, UNR, UDR, RPR), Poujade became the first Minister of the Environment in France in 1971. He served in the government of Prime Minister Jacques Chaban-Delmas, under the presidency of Georges Pompidou.

As an opponent to the mayor of Dijon Félix Kir, Robert Poujade ran for Member of Parliament for the first time in 1962. He succeeded only in 1967, and stayed at the parliament to 1981, year of Mitterrand's victory. He was returned at the National Assembly in year 1986 and held the post continuously until his retirement in 2002.

In Dijon, Robert Poujade entered the city council in 1968. After Felix Kir's death in 1971, he became the first Gaullist mayor of Dijon. He retired in 2001, and his successor Jean-François Bazin lost the election against François Rebsamen, who became the first Socialist mayor of the City since before the Second World War. Robert Poujade died in Paris on 8 April 2020 at the age of 91.
