= Félix Kir =

French politician (1876–1968)

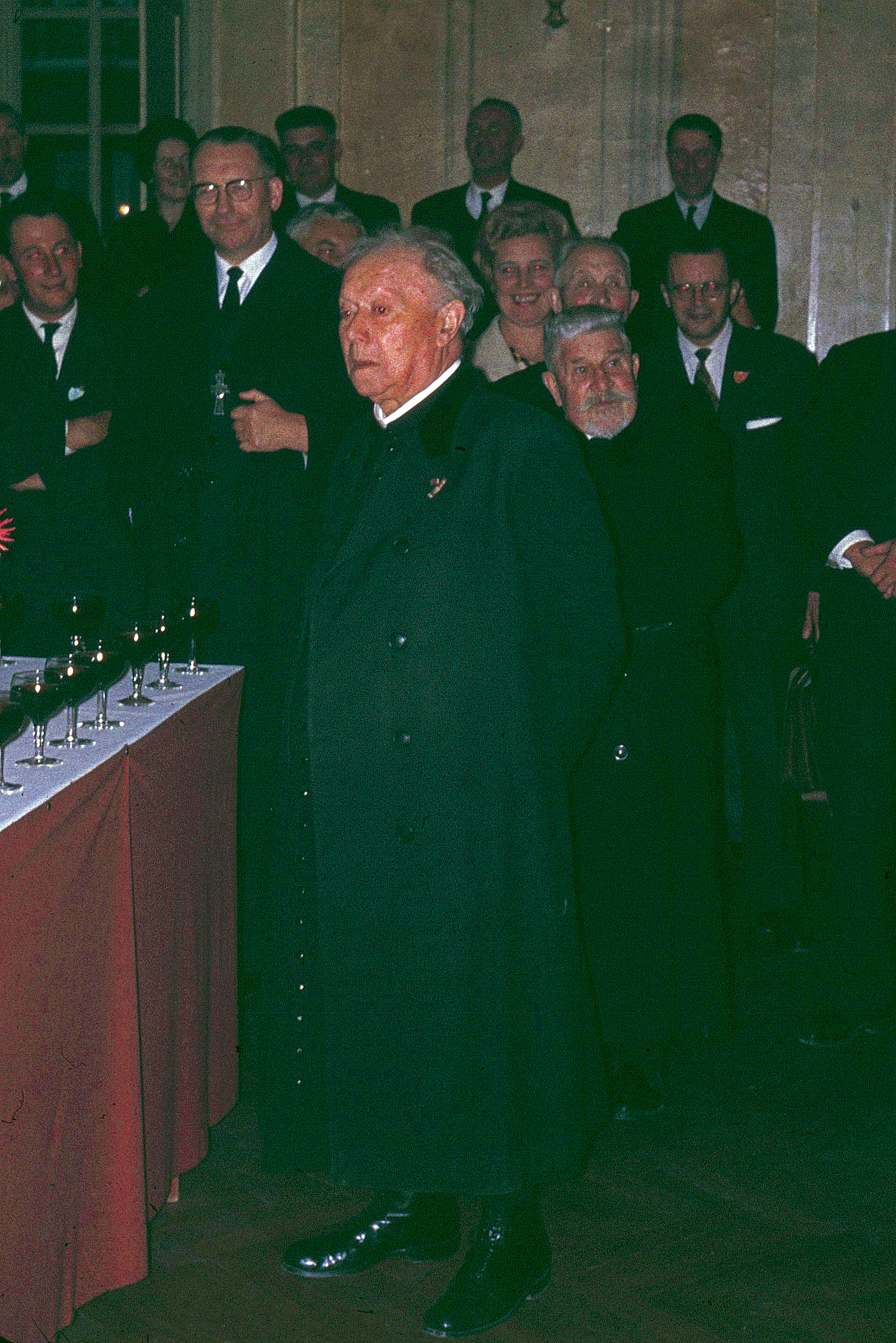
Félix Kir in 1963

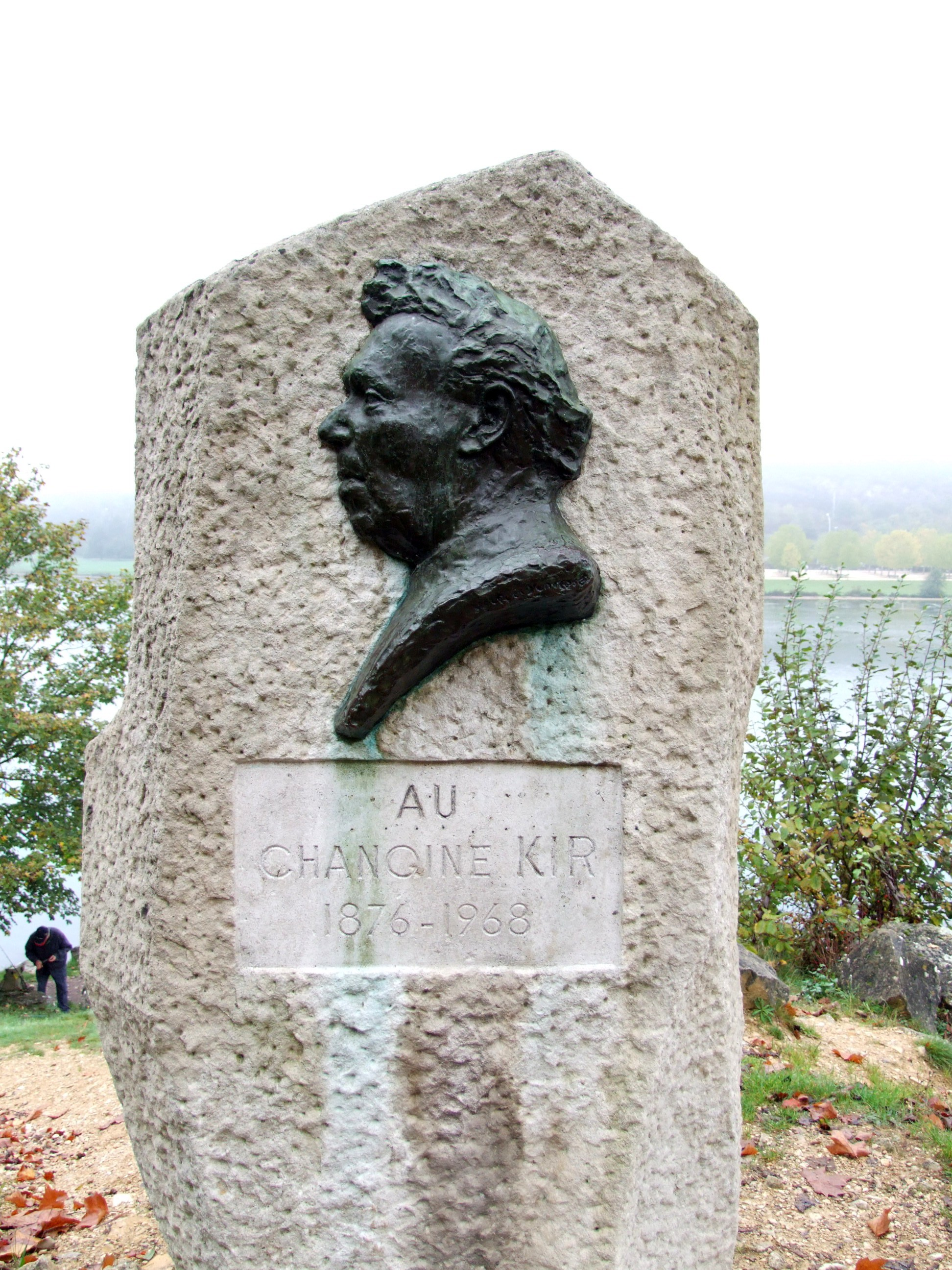
Monument to Félix Kir near Kir Lake

Canon Félix Kir (22 January 1876 - 26 April 1968) was a French Catholic priest, resistance fighter and politician.

== Life ==
He was born at Alise-Sainte-Reine on the Côte-d'Or. He entered a small seminary at Plombières-lès-Dijon in 1891 and was ordained in 1901. He then worked as a parish priest.

During the occupation of France during World War II, he took an active part in the French Resistance, helping with the escape of 5,000 prisoners of war from a camp at Longvic. He was arrested and condemned to death, but he was released because of his status. He continued organising operations and was seriously wounded, but escaped interrogation by the Gestapo.

In 1945, he was made a knight of the Légion d'honneur and was elected to the position of mayor of Dijon and to the French National Assembly. He remained the mayor of Dijon up to his death in 1968.

== Legacy ==
A local drink, then locally known as blanc-cassis, consists of white burgundy wine, traditionally Aligoté, mixed with crème de cassis, a sweet, blackcurrant-flavoured liqueur. Kir habitually served this local drink to delegations, and so the drink itself is now known internationally as a Kir. Alternately, some contend that German soldiers confiscated most of the region's red wine, so Kir converted a local brew of red wine and crème de cassis into a combination of white wine and crème de cassis, thus creating the drink.

An artificial lake built to the west of Dijon was named Lac Kir in his honour. (47°19′40″N 4°59′56″E)
