= Bernard Depierre =

French politician

Bernard Depierre (born 6 June 1945 in Bourbon-Lancy) is a member of the National Assembly of France. He represents the Côte-d'Or department, and is a member of the Union for a Popular Movement.

== Biography ==
Bernard Depierre has served as HR Director for major pharmaceutical companies. At the local level, he is Deputy Mayor in charge of urban policy, youth, and sports for the city of Dijon. He also founded the CFA du Sport in Dijon, with branches in Gueugnon, Chalon, Cuiseaux-Louhans, and JDA Dijon Basket. A former director of JDA Dijon and the National Basketball League, he is president of the Burgundy Basketball League. In December 2008, he ran for president of the French Federation of Basketball. He withdrew his candidacy after the first round of voting.

He was a member of parliament for the UMP from 2002 to 2012, representing the 1st constituency of Côte-d'Or. He lost his seat to Laurent Grandguillaume on June 17, 2012.
