= Didier Martin =

French politician

Didier Martin is a French politician representing Renaissance (RE). He was elected to the French National Assembly on 18 June 2017, representing the 1st constituency in the department of Côte-d'Or.

== See also ==
- 2017 French legislative election
