= Departmental Council of Côte-d'Or =

Departmental legislature in France

Departmental Council of Côte-d'Or Conseil départemental de la Côte-d'Or
- Logo of the Council

Leadership
- Presidents: François Sauvadet, UDI since 20 March 2008

Meeting place
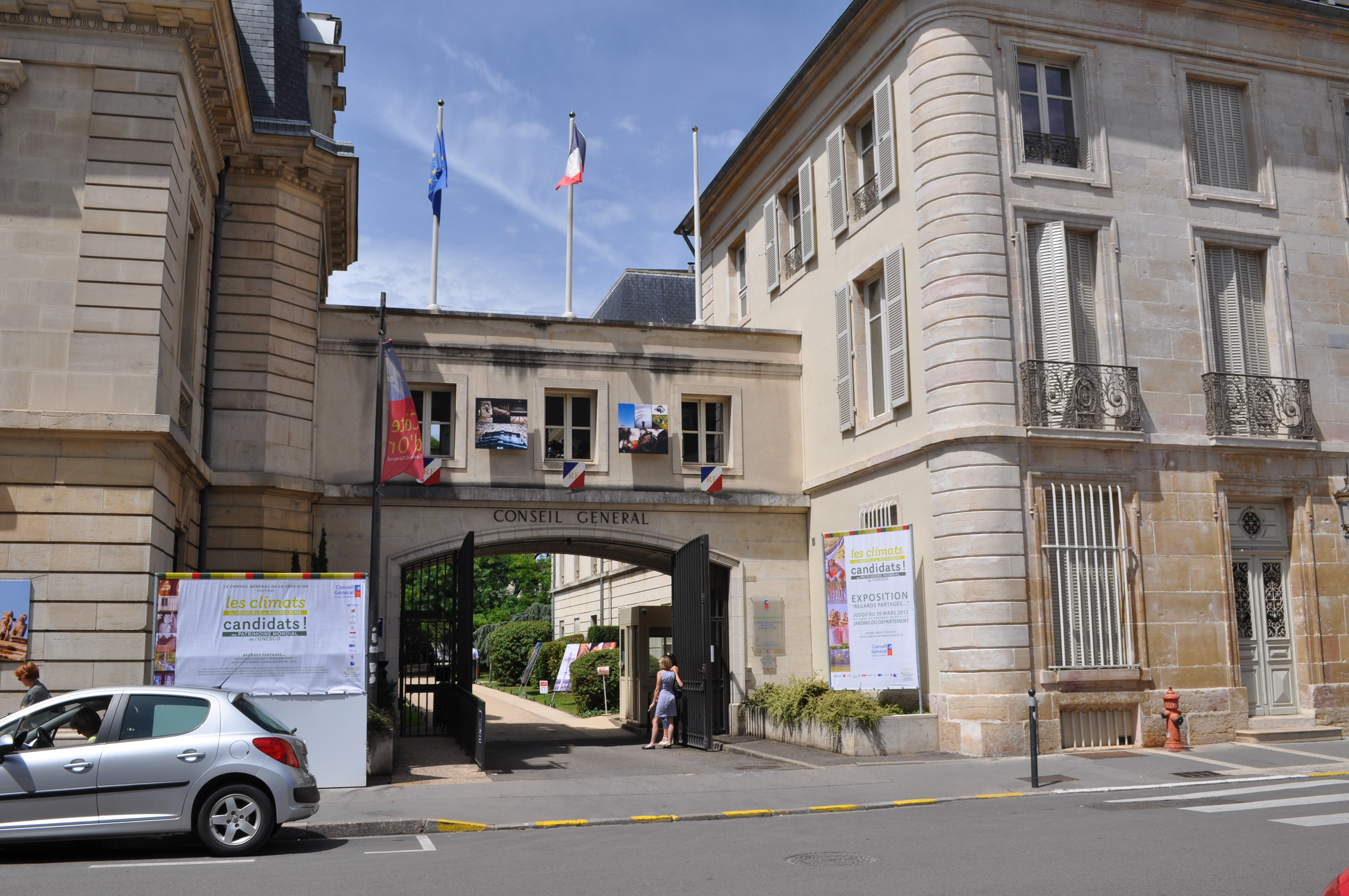
- Hôtel du Département, Dijon

Website
- www.cotedor.fr

The Departmental Council of Côte-d'Or (French: Conseil départemental de la Côte-d'Or) is the deliberative assembly of the French department of Côte-d'Or. Before the 2015 departmental elections, this body was called the general council of Côte-d'Or.

It is made up of 46 departmental councilors elected from its 23 cantons for a term of six years. Its headquarters are in Dijon.

== Executive ==
=== President ===
The president of the Côte-d'Or departmental council is François Sauvadet (UDI), former civil service minister, since 2008.

List of successive presidents
Period		Name	Party
1945	1946	Jean Bouhey	SFIO
1951	1961	Robert Kuhn	DVD
1951	1966	Marcel Roclore	CNIP
1966	1975	Jean Veillet	CNIP
1975	1979	Henri Massias Jurien de La Gravière	DVD
1979	1982	Pierre Palau	PS
1982	1988	Robert Poujade	RPR
1988	1994	Henry Berger	RPR
1994	2008	Louis de Broissia	RPR then UMP
2008	Incumbent	François Sauvadet	UDI

=== Vice-presidents ===
The president of the departmental council is assisted by 13 vice-presidents chosen from among the departmental advisers. Each of them has a delegation of authority.

List of vice-presidents of the Côte-d'Or Departmental Council (as of 2021)
Order	Name	Canton (constituency)
1st	François-Xavier Dugourd	Dijon-1
2nd	Hubert Brigand	Châtillon-sur-Seine
3rd	Martine Eap-Dupin	Semur-en-Auxois
4th	Emmanuelle Coint	Brazey-en-Plaine
5th	Ludovic Rochette	Dijon-4
6th	Jean-Pierre Rebourgeon	Beaune
7th	Catherine Louis	Is-sur-Tille
8th	Laurence Porte	Montbard
9th	Denis Thomas	Ladoix-Serrigny
10th	Marc Frot	Montbard
11th	Marie-Claire Bonnet-Vallet	Auxonne
12th	Patricia Gourmand	Fontaine-lès-Dijon
13th	Dominique Girard	Auxonne

== Composition ==
The Côte-d'Or departmental council includes 46 departmental councilors from the 23 cantons of Côte-d'Or.

Composition by party (as of 2021)
Party	Acronym	Seats	Groups
Majority (28 seats)
Miscellaneous right	DVD	16	La Côte-d'Or passionnément
The Republicans	LR	8	La Côte-d'Or passionnément
Miscellaneous centre	DVC	4	La Côte-d'Or passionnément
Opposition (18 seats)
Socialist Party	PS	9	Côte-d'Or Terres d'avenir
Miscellaneous left	DVG	7	Côte-d'Or Terres d'avenir
Europe Ecology-The Greens	EELV	2	Côte-d'Or Terres d'avenir

== Budget ==
The initial 2024 budget of the department is €679 million. It was voted by the departmental council during the session of 18 and 19 December, 2023.
