= Radio Shalom =

Radio Shalom can refer to multiple radio stations:

- Radio Shalom Copenhagen - Denmark
- Radio Shalom Dijon - France
- Radio Shalom Paris - France
- Radio Shalom Sweden - Sweden
- CJRS (Radio Shalom Montreal) - Canada (2001-2016)
- Radio Shalom (Liberia) - Liberia
- Rádio Shalom (Brazil)
