= Jean Le Fevre =

Jean Le Fevre may refer to:

- Jean Le Fèvre (bishop of Chartres) (c. 1335-1390), French Roman Catholic bishop
- Jean Le Fèvre de Saint-Remy (died 1468), Burgundian chronicler
- Jean Le Fèvre (canon) (1493–1565), French canon
- Jean Le Fèvre (astronomer) (1652–1706), French astronomer and physicist
- Jean Le Fèvre de Ressons (c. 1320-1380), poet and attorney at the Paris Parliament
