= Hermine Horiot =

French cellist

Hermine Horiot (born 14 May 1986) is a French cellist.

== Life ==
Born in Dijon, Horiot studied the cello from the age of six, which she continued at the age of fifteen at the Conservatoire de Paris.

She performs with the Orchestre National Bordeaux Aquitaine and the Orchestre symphonique de Bretagne as guest solo cello, and works regularly with the Orchestre de Paris, the Orchestre Philharmonique de Radio-France and the Orchestre d'Auvergne. She is invited to festivals such as the 1001 Notes Festival and the Pablo Casals Festival. She collaborates with artists such as Laurent Korcia, Cyprien Katsaris and Ferenc Vizi. She plays on an 1874 Miremont cello.

== Discography ==
- Romance Oubliée with Ferenc Vizi.

== Awards ==
Horiot won the first prize in the Vatelot-Rampal competition, she is the winner of the 2012 Festival Juventus and of the "Fondation Banque populaire".
