= Suzon (river) =

Coordinates: 47°17′12″N 5°04′59″E

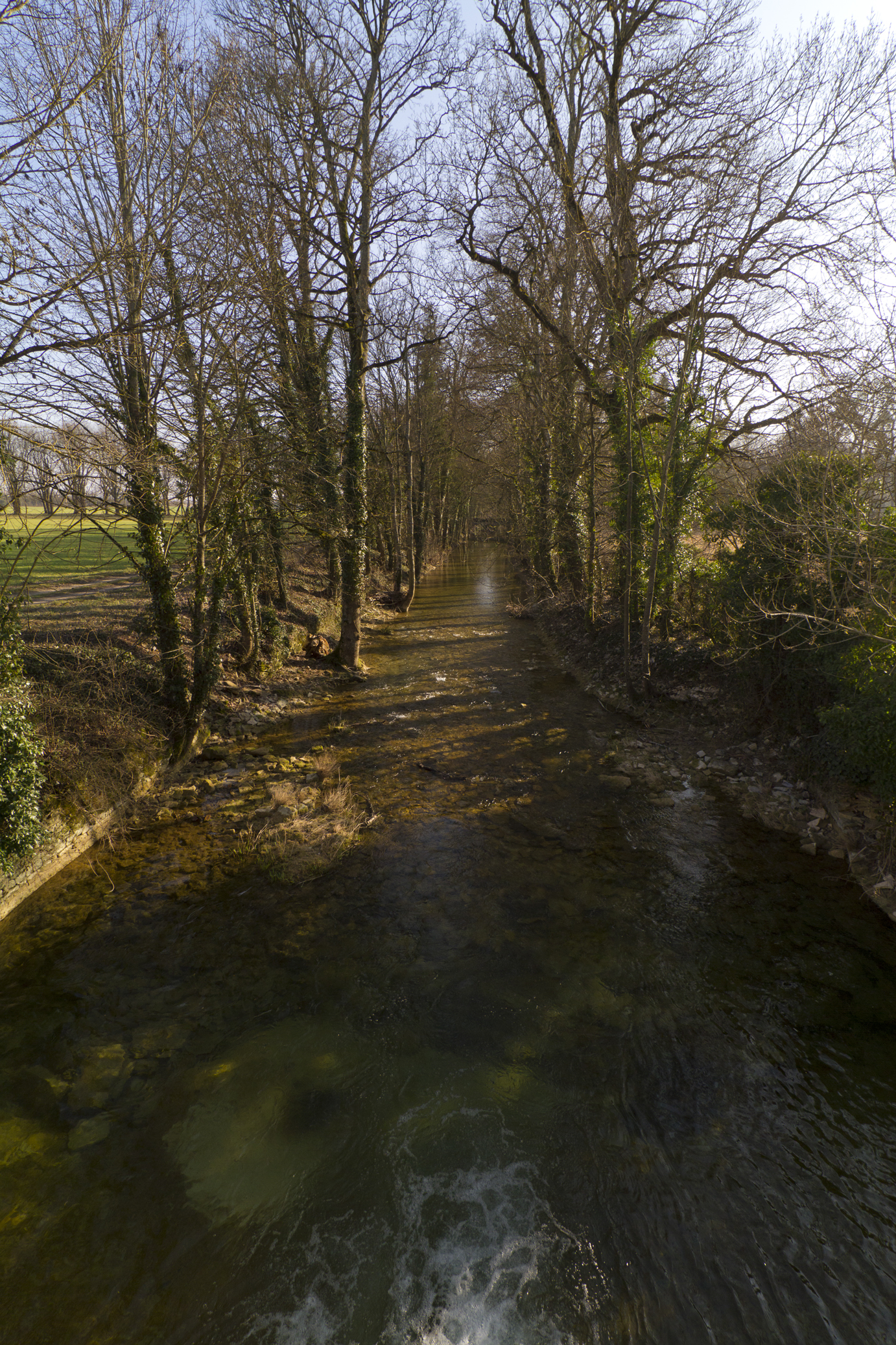
The Suzon in Vantoux.

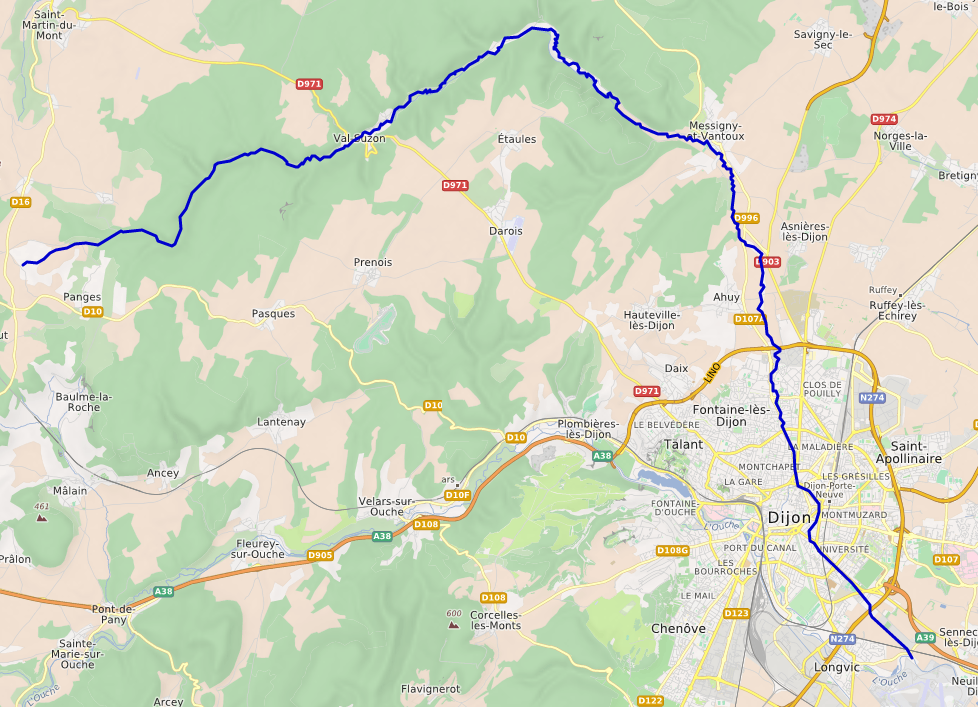
Course of the Suzon.

The Suzon is a French river in the Côte-d'Or department, in the Bourgogne-Franche-Comté region and a tributary of the Ouche, therefore a sub-tributary of the Rhône, by the Saône. The river enters the Ouche at Dijon.
