= Charles Poisot =

French musician and musicologist (1822–1904)

Charles Poisot (7 July 1822 – 4 March 1904) was a French musician from the second half of the 19th century. A pianist, composer and musicographer, he was also director of the Dijon Conservatory, where he spent his life.

== Biography ==
Charles Poisot was born in Dijon, but his family moved to Paris in 1834. He entered the Conservatoire de Paris in 1844 where he studied piano with Adolphe Adam, counterpoint with Leborne and musical composition with Fromental Halévy until 1848.

In 1850, he composed an Opéra comique in an act, Le Paysan, on a traditional theme mixing nobility and love (the libretto is by Pujol).

He returned to Dijon in 1852 where he devoted himself to teaching, musicology and composition, continuing his piano interpretations. In 1868, he was appointed Director of the Municipal School of Music, the future Conservatoire à rayonnement régional de Dijon, and was elected a member of the Académie des Sciences, Arts et Belles-Lettres de Dijon in 1869. He played an active role in the city's cultural life until his sudden death in his home at 4 Buffon Street at the age of 81.

He had his works performed in the city, gave talks on the glories of Burgundy (sculptor François Rude, poet and playwright Charles Brifaut and created a high level choir: "la Société des Dames". A street in Dijon bears his name.

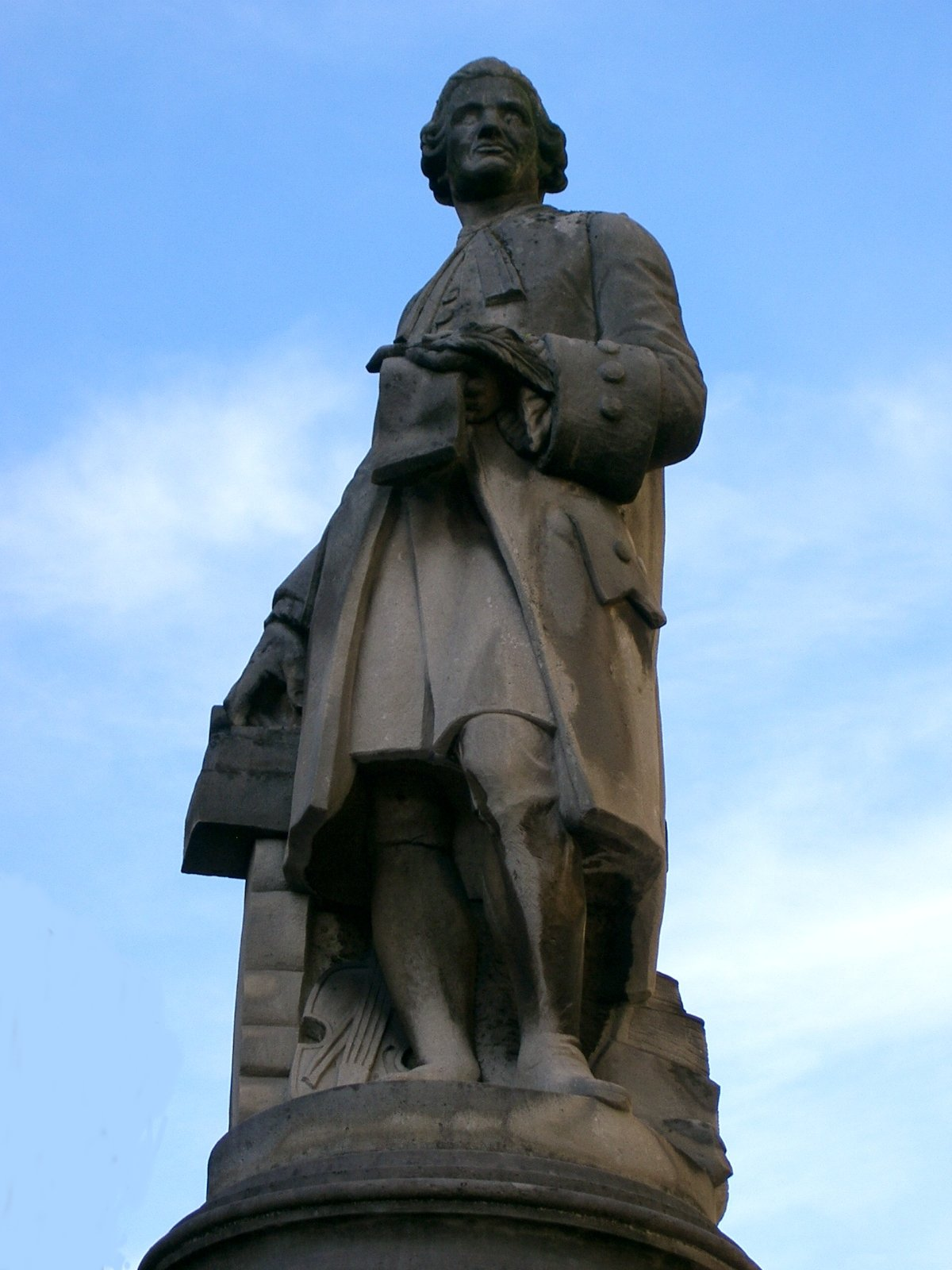
Current statue of Jean-Philippe Rameau in Dijon. Stone copy of the original 1880 statue

A fervent admirer of Jean-Philippe Rameau, he began in 1860 with other Dijonnais (Jules Mercier, Léon Gastinel, ...) a campaign to erect a statue in honour of the great Dijon composer of the 18th century for the centenary of his death in 1864. The affair dragged on for a long time and it was only on 12 August 1876 that the model of the sculptor's statue Eugène Guillaume was finally erected on Place de la Sainte-Chapelle and a concert was given at the Grand Théâtre with Camille Saint-Saëns. It was not until 1880 that the model was replaced by the final bronze statue (it was melted down by the Germans in 1942 and replaced by a stone copy in 1950). Charles Poisot collaborated in the publication of Rameau's works and produced numerous arrangements for piano and singing of his operas. He was also involved in the creation of the "Société des Compositeurs de Musique" (established in Paris in 1862).

== Works ==
His musical work is quite abundant and varied, but it has not left its mark on the history of music. He composed opéras comiques early in his career (Le Paysan in 1850), religious pieces (one cantata, Jeanne d'Arc; motets; one Stabat Mater; one requiem, three oratorios) and many piano pieces (exercises, arrangements, songs, melodies and fantasies), some in collaboration with Joseph O'Kelly.

He also wrote many texts on music, such as his brochure on Burgundian musicians in 1854 or his Histoire de la musique en France, depuis les temps les plus reculés jusqu’à nos jours (Paris 1860).

=== Musicology ===
- Essai sur les musiciens bourguignons, comprenant une esquisse historique sur les différentes transformations de l'art musical en France du IXe au XIXe siècle Dijon 1854, 56 pages.
- Histoire de la musique en France, depuis les temps les plus reculés jusqu’à nos jours Paris 1860, 384 pages
- Notice biographique sur Jean-Philippe Rameau publiée à l’occasion de l’anniversaire séculaire de sa mort, Dijon 1864, 31 pages.
- Lecture sur les trois séjours de Mozart à Paris 1873

=== Texts on regional themes ===
- Notice on sculptor François Rude, 1856
- Notice on Charles Brifaut (poet, journalist and playwright born in Dijon in 1781, died in Paris in 1857.) 1859
- De Dijon à Rome et à Naples, notes de voyage d'un musicien lues à l'Académie de Dijon, 1875

=== Compositions ===
==== Opéras comiques ====
- Le Paysan, 1-act opéra comique, 1850
- Les Terreurs de M. Peters, opéra de salon, 1856

==== Religious works ====
- Agnus Dei for tenor and barytone. 1855
- Paraphrase du Stabat Mater: for Soli (soprano, viola, tenor and bass) and choir with organ accompaniment (reduction of orchestra)
- Le Christ. Three-part Oratorio [singing and piano]. Texts from the Gospels, 1882
- Ave Maria pour mezzo-soprano, 1883
- Caecilia, légende sacrée, 1888
- L'Apôtre Saint Jean, third oratorio. Texts from Revelation. 1895

==== Songs ====
- Le Bonhomme Misère. Légende bretonne, 1853
- L'Amour, 1860
- Le Rêve à deux, poem by Marceline Desbordes-Valmore, 1868
- Les Affres de la mort. Scène pour basse, musical setting of poems by Théophile Gautier, 1868
- La Bourgogne, 1869

==== Piano music ====
- Fleur de mai, mazurka, 1875
- and many other

==== Arrangements ====
- Les Indes galantes: heroic ballet in 4 concerts and 1 new entry by Jean-Philippe Rameau; reconstituted and reduced score for piano and vocals by Jean Philippe Rameau. Charles Poisot, after the original 1735 scored
- Hippolyte et Aricie: lyrical tragedy in 5 acts & a prologue of Rameau; Reconstructed and reduced for piano and vocals by Charles Poisot. (1882)
- Zoroastre: 5-act lyrical tragedy by Rameau; reconstituted and reduced for piano and vocals by Rameau Charles Poisot.
- Platée ou Junon jalouse: ballet comedy (bouffe) in 3 acts and a prologue by Rameau; Reconstructed and reduced for piano and vocals by Charles Poisot.
