= Louis-Florentin Calmeil =

French psychiatrist and medical historian

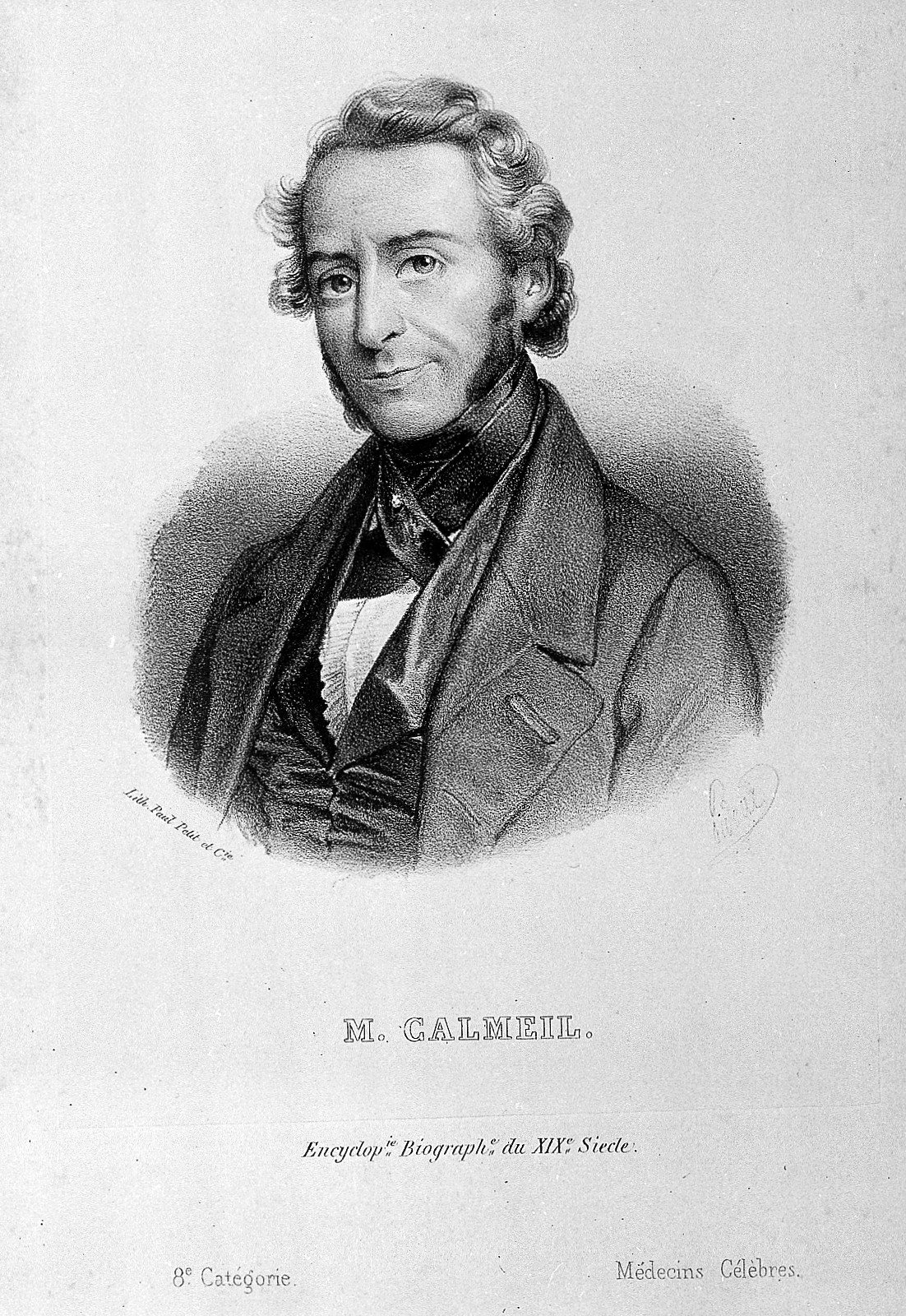

Louis-Florentin Calmeil (August 9, 1798 – March 11, 1895) was a French psychiatrist and medical historian born in Yversay.

== Biography ==
He was an assistant to Jean-Étienne Dominique Esquirol (1772–1840) at Charenton, where he later succeeded Esquirol as director. Among his assistants at Charenton was forensic psychiatrist Henri Legrand du Saulle (1830–1886).

In 1823, he obtained his appointment to the royal house of Charenton as a surgical intern. He will stay in this establishment of Charenton for half a century. In January 1824, he became a medical intern in the department of Antoine-Athanase Royer-Collard. That same year, 1824, he defended his thesis under the supervision of Royer-Collard: De l'épilepsie étudiée sous le rapport de son siège et de son influence sur la production de l'aliénation mentale.

He is remembered for a work on insanity called "De la folie, considérée sous le point de vue pathologique, philosophique, historique et judiciaire". It was one of the first publications dedicated to the history of psychiatry, and was a rational discourse that dealt with topics such as demonology, lycanthropy, religious obsession and other abnormal thought processes. The book covered psychiatric issues from the 15th to the 19th century, and is still read today. Another important work by Calmeil was an 1826 treatise that discussed general paresis, considered to be the first separately identifiable neuropsychiatric disease entity. General paresis was originally described a few years earlier by Antoine Laurent Bayle (1799–1858).

Calmeil is credited with introducing the concept of "epileptic absence" for the brief loss of consciousness or confusion observed in epileptic patients.

== Selected writings ==
- De la Paralysie consideée chez les Aliénés, (1826).
- Traité d'anatomie et de physiologie du système nerveux, (1840).
- De la folie, considérée sous le point de vue pathologique, philosophique, historique et judiciaire (1845).
- Traité des maladies inflammatoires du Cerveau, (1859).

== Bibliography ==
- This article is based on a translation of an equivalent article at the German Wikipedia.
- John Gach Books, Inc. Crime, Forensics, Medical Jurisprudence, etc.
