= Henri Legrand du Saulle =

French psychiatrist (1830–1886)

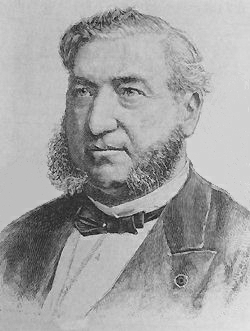
Henri Legrand du Saulle

Henri Legrand du Saulle (Dijon, 16 April 1830 – Paris, 5 May 1886) was a French psychiatrist.

As a young man he worked as an assistant to Bénédict Morel (1809–1873) at Saint-Yon, and also served under Louis-Florentin Calmeil (1798–1895) at the Charenton Asylum. In 1856 became a doctor to the medical faculty in Paris. Later on, he was appointed physician at the Bicêtre Hospital (replacing Prosper Lucas 1805–1885), and in 1879 succeeded Louis Delasiauve (1804–1893) as chief physician in the department for epileptics at Salpêtrière Hospital. During his career he was also associated with the Prefecture of Police, serving from 1863 as médecin-adjoint to Charles Lasègue (1816–1883).

He is known for his studies on personality disorders, particularly pioneer work involving phobias and obsessive-compulsive disorders. He also performed extensive work in forensic psychiatry, being interested with the medical-judicial aspects of psychopathology.

== Selected writings ==
- La folie devant les tribunaux (1864).
- Prisbelönt av Institutet, Pronostic et traitement d’épilepsie (1869).
- Le délire des persécutions (1871).
- La folie héréditaire (1873).
- Traité de médecine legale, de jurisprudence médicale et de toxicologie (1874).
- La folie du doute avec délire du toucher (1875).
- Étude médico-légale sur les épileptiques (1877).
- Étude clinique sur la peur des espaces (1878).
- Étude médico-légale sur l’interdiction des aliénés (1880).
- Les hystériques (1882).

== Bibliography ==
- An Historical Dictionary of Psychiatry by Edward Shorter
- Psychiatrie histoire (biography in French)
