= Jean-Jacques-Joseph Debillemont =

French musician, composer, conductor and music critic (1824–1879)

Jean-Jacques-Joseph Debillemont (12 December 1824, Dijon – 14 February 1879, Paris) was a 19th-century French musician, both a composer, music critic, and conductor who devoted himself mainly to incidental music (operettas and ballets).

== Biography ==
Having learned the violin at age nine in his hometown, he moved to the capital aged fifteen to join the Conservatoire de Paris. He then continued his training by joining the orchestra of the Opéra-comique and followed lessons of musical composition with Leborne Carafa and thanks to a grant from the General Council of the Côte d'Or.

He founded a chamber music quartet with violinist Jules Mercier (died 1868) and played his first compositions in Dijon (le Renégat, 1849, le Bandolero, 1850, Feu mon oncle, opéra bouffe, 1851, le Joujou) before giving his first works in Paris. His many works include C'était moi, operetta in 1860, Astaroth opéra comique in 1861, la Vipérine operetta in 1866, Napoléon devant les peuples, cantata in 1867, Grand Duc de Matapa opéra bouffe in 1868, le Pantalon de Casimir, one-act operetta in 1873, Le Miroir magique, féerie-ballet in 3 acts, in 1876.

His works, especially his opéras comiques, had some success. François-Joseph Fétis said about the premiere of the Grand-duc de Matapa, 16 November 1868 at the Théâtre des Menus-plaisirs: "the music of Mr. Debillemont pleasantly caresses the ear. It is cheerful, as befits an opéra comique score, but never stops being fine and distinguished". But his compositions sometimes encounter reluctance as that of Felix Clement in his Dictionnaire des opéras, supplément, 1872 à propos La Revanche de Candaule, opéra comique in one act presented in 1869: "Everything is grotesque in this little work. [...] The music offered nothing salient."

Alongside his composing activity, around 1865, Debillemont headed the orchestra of the Société des Beaux-Arts, before directing the orchestra of the Opéra Comique at the Théâtre de la Porte Saint-Martin. He was also responsible for music critic columns in various newspapers such as L'élu du peuple in Dijon or la Revue et gazette des théâtres in Paris.

Jean-Jacques Debillemont also participated in various theater projects such as stage adaptations of works by Jules Verne like Le Tour du monde en 80 jours, play in 5 acts and one prologue (15 tableaux) premiered in Paris at the Théâtre de la Porte-Saint-Martin, 7 November 1874, text by MM. Adolphe d'Ennery and Jules Verne, or Les Enfants du capitaine Grant in 1879.
