= Vantoux =

- Commune
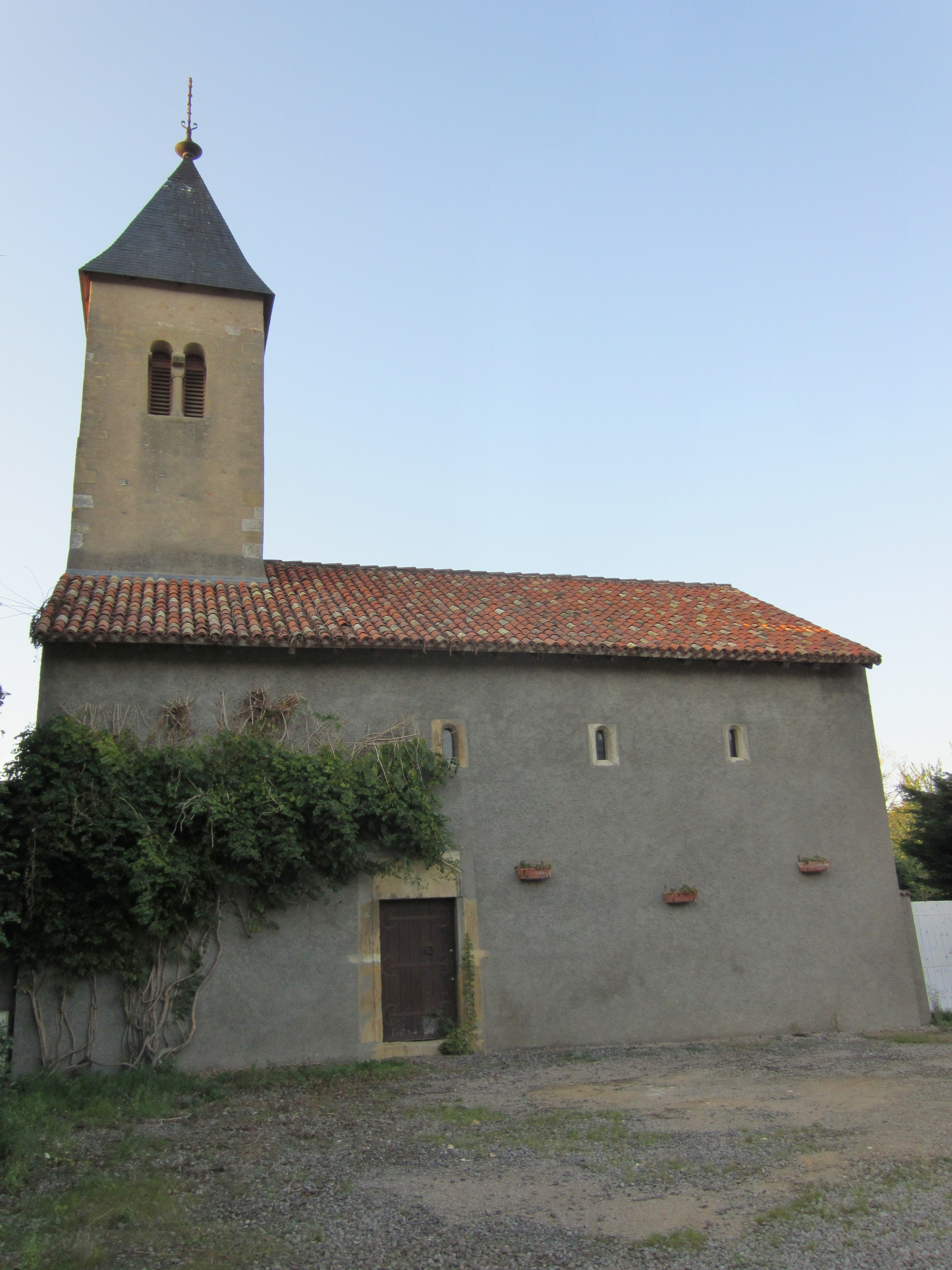
- The chapel in Vantoux

- Coat of arms
- Location of Vantoux
- Location within France Location within Grand Est
- Coordinates: 49°07′50″N 6°13′53″E
- Country: France
- Region: Grand Est
- Department: Moselle
- Arrondissement: Metz
- Canton: Le Pays Messin
- Intercommunality: Metz Métropole

Government
  - Mayor (2020–2026): Antoine Dorr
- Area^{1}: 2.45 km^{2} (0.95 sq mi)
- Elevation: 284 m (932 ft)
- Highest elevation: 258 m (846 ft)
- Lowest elevation: 174 m (571 ft)
- Population (2023): 823
  - Density: 336/km^{2} (870/sq mi)
- Time zone: UTC+01:00 (CET)
  - Summer (DST): UTC+02:00 (CEST)
- INSEE/Postal code: 57693 /57070
- ^{1} French Land Register data, which excludes lakes, ponds, glaciers > 1 km^{2} (0.386 sq mi or 247 acres) and river estuaries.

Vantoux (French pronunciation: [vɑ̃tu]; German: Wanten) is a commune in the Moselle department in Grand Est in north-eastern France.

== Geography ==
The Suzon river passes in the commune.

== See also ==
- Communes of the Moselle department
