= Dijon =

Prefecture of Bourgogne-Franche-Comté, France

Dijon Digion (Burgundian)
- Prefecture and commune
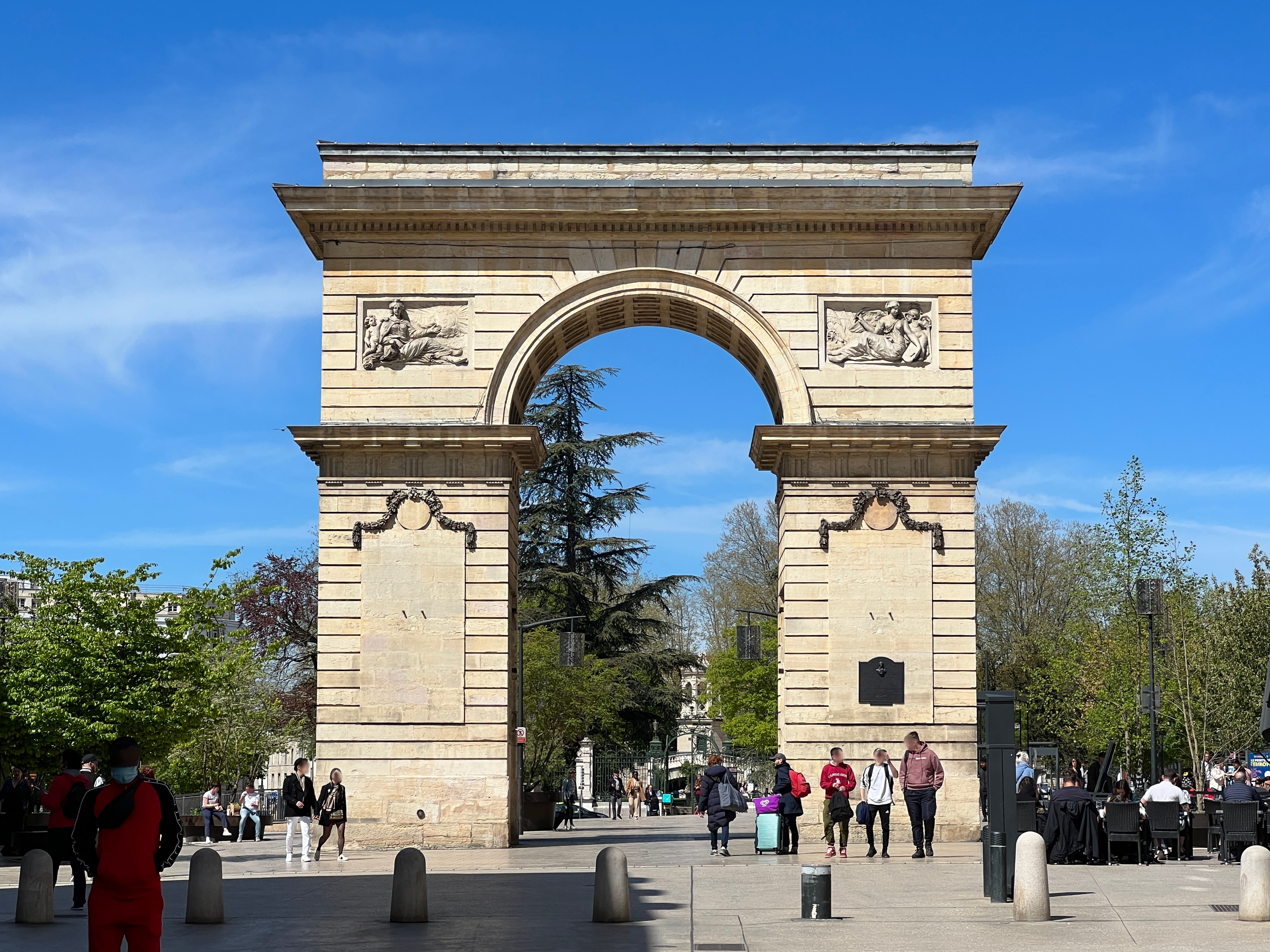
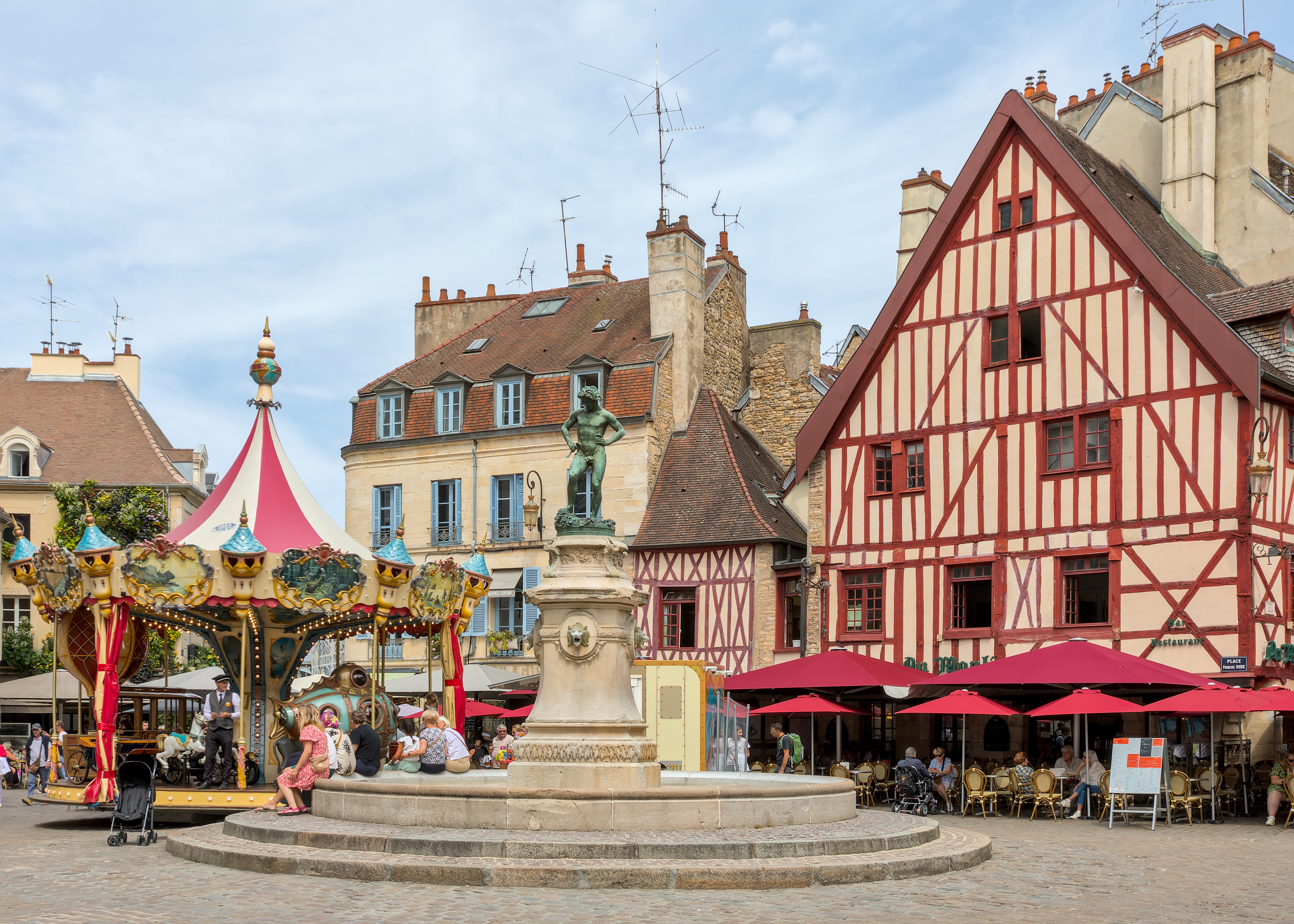
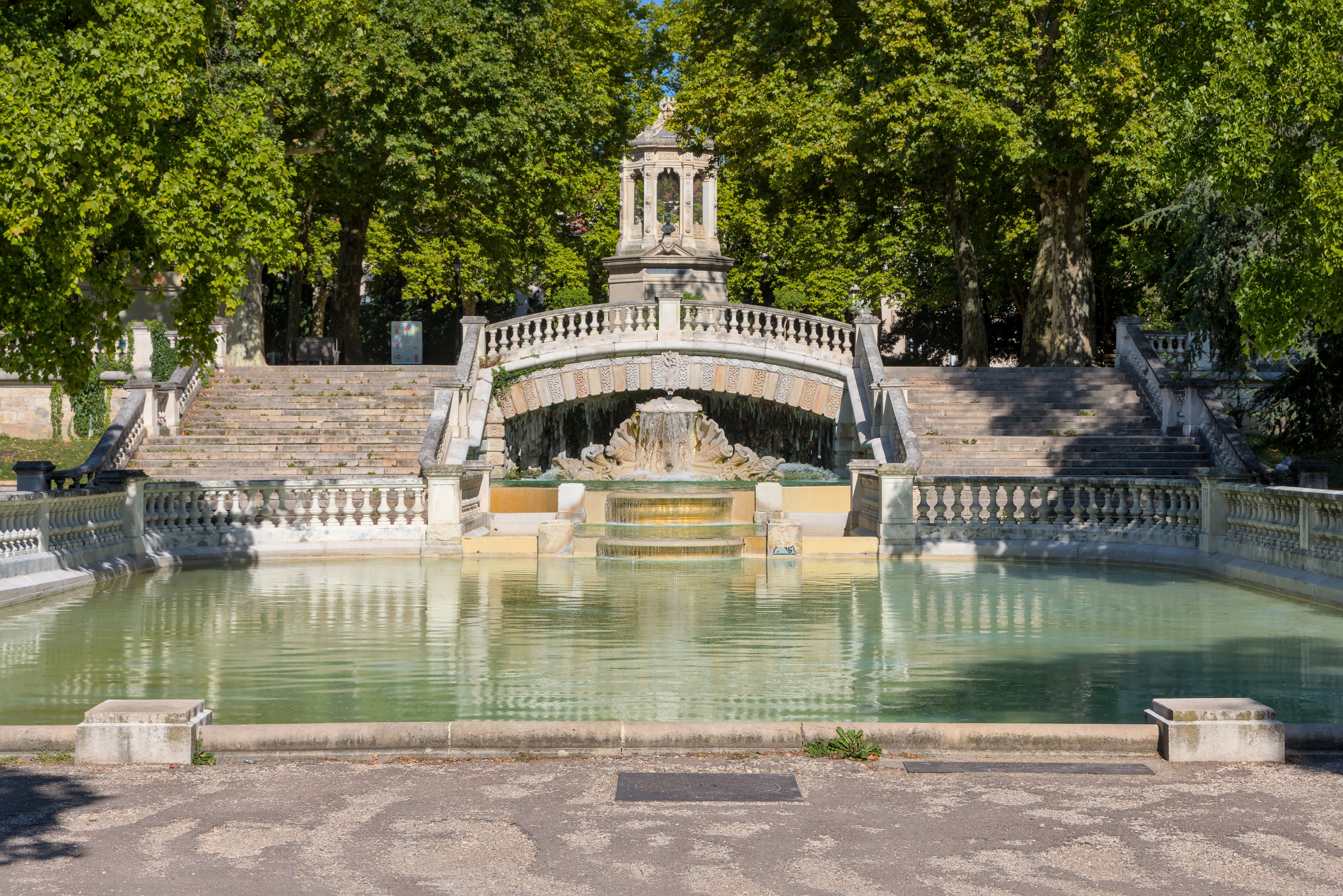
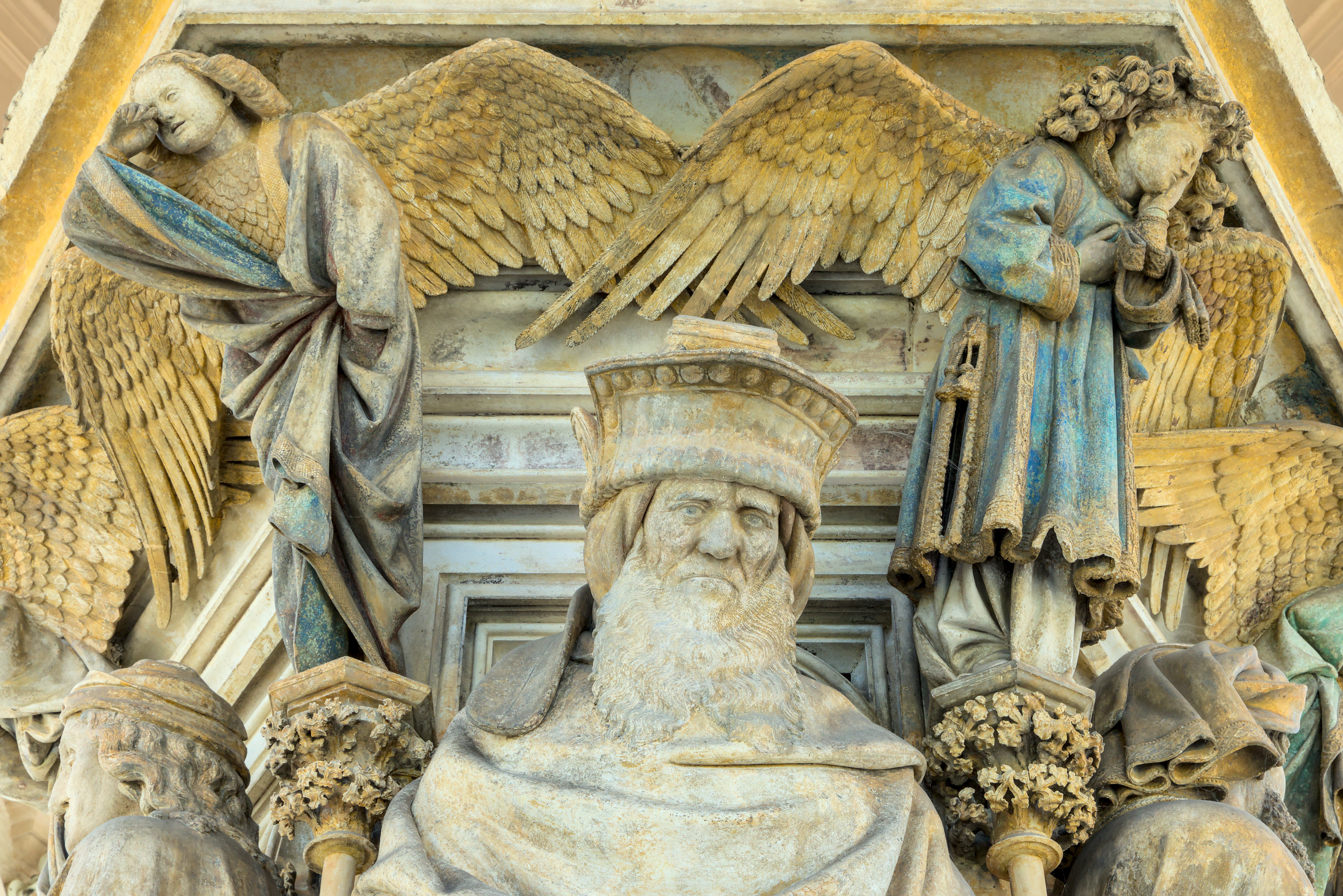
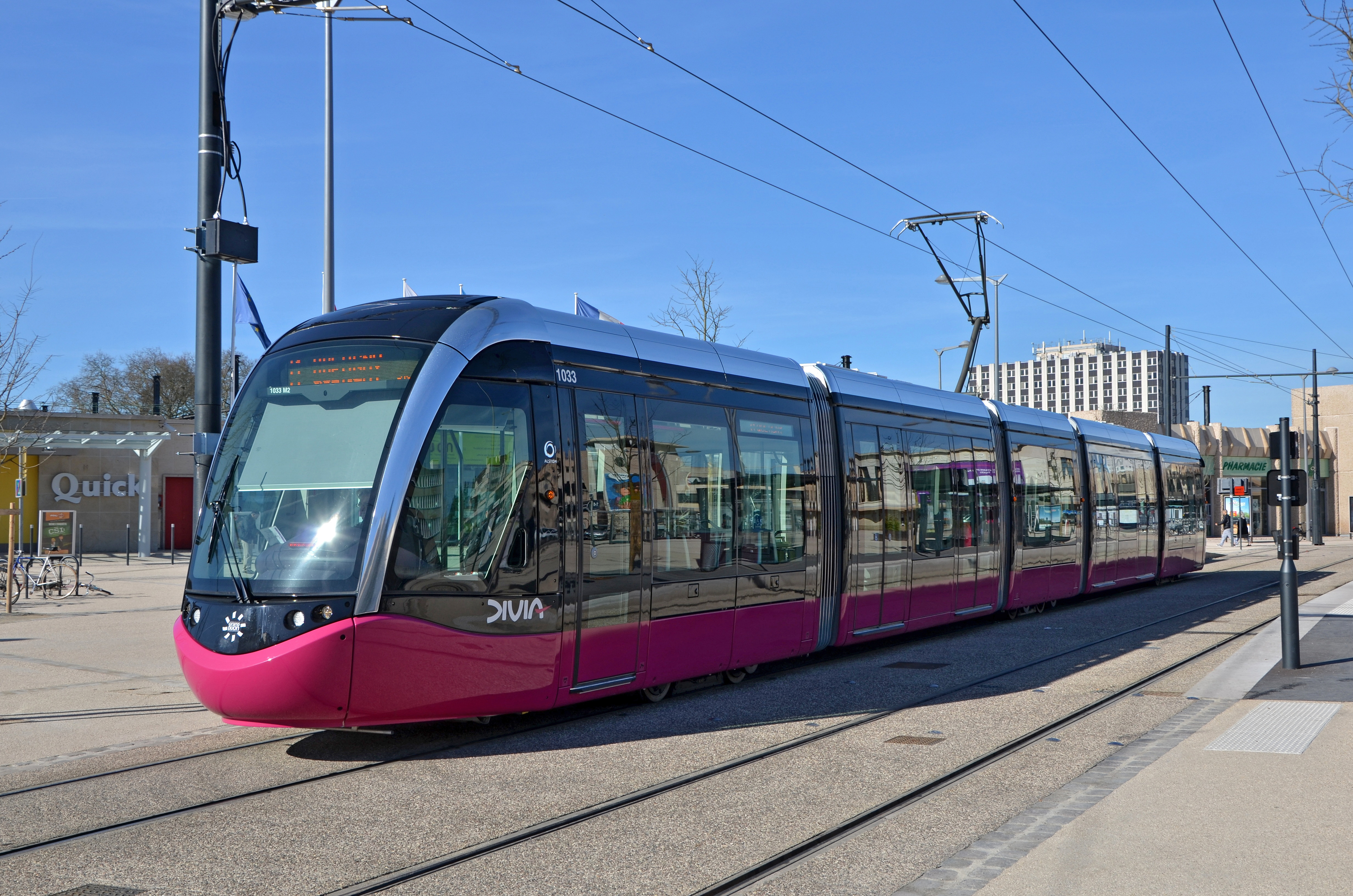
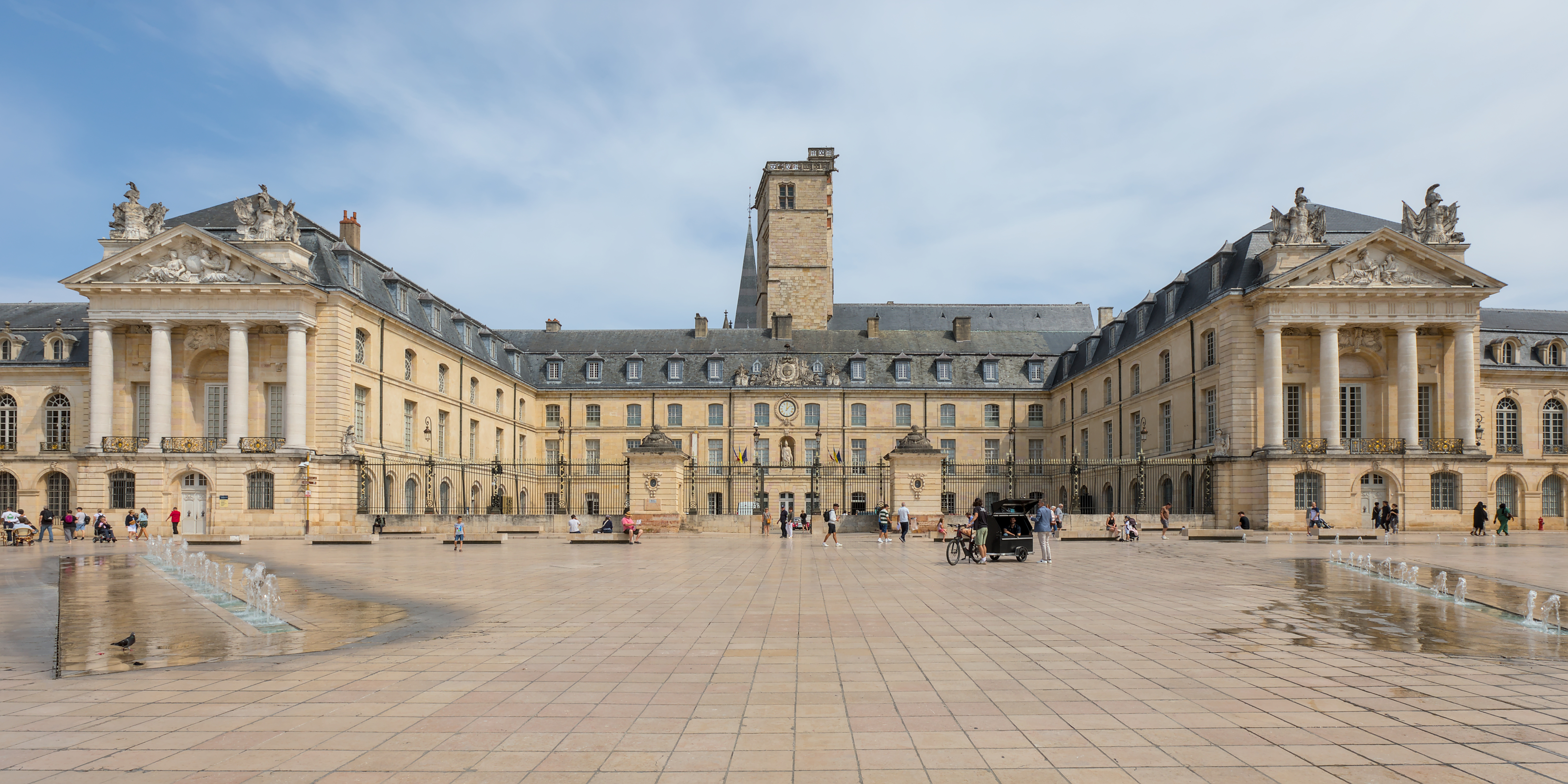
- Place du Théâtre Porte Guillaume Place François Rude Jardin Darcy Well of Moses Dijon tramway Palace of the Dukes of Burgundy

- Flag Coat of arms
- Location of Dijon
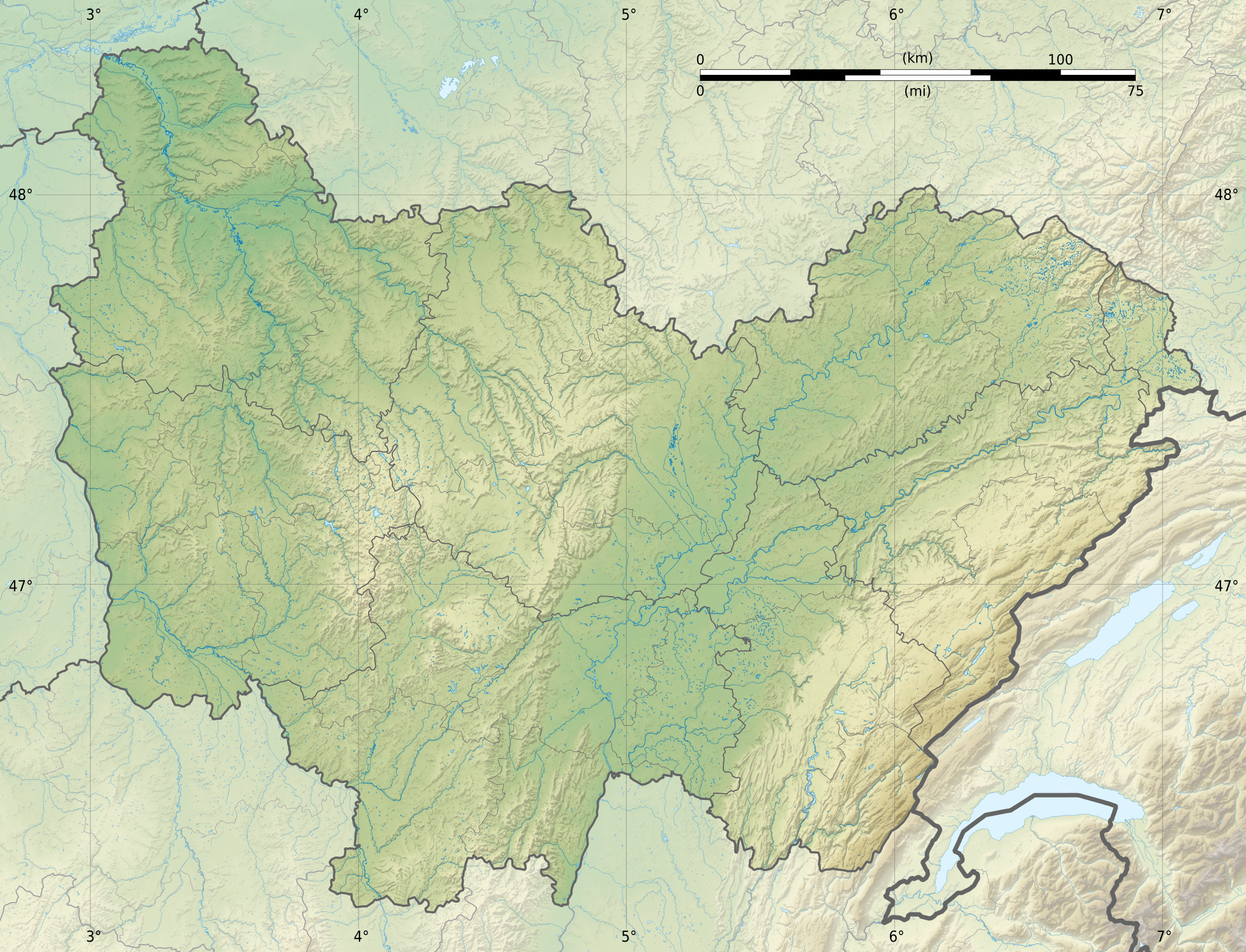
- Location within France Location within Bourgogne-Franche-Comté
- Coordinates: 47°19′00″N 5°01′00″E
- Country: France
- Region: Bourgogne-Franche-Comté
- Department: Côte-d'Or
- Arrondissement: Dijon
- Canton: Dijon-1, 2, 3, 4, 5 and 6
- Intercommunality: Dijon Métropole

Government
  - Mayor (2026–32): Nathalie Koenders (PS)
- Area^{1}: 40.41 km^{2} (15.60 sq mi)
- Elevation: 245 m (804 ft)
- Highest elevation: 410 m (1,350 ft)
- Lowest elevation: 220 m (720 ft)
- Population (2023): 161,830
  - Density: 4,005/km^{2} (10,370/sq mi)
- Demonym(s): Dijonnais (masculine); Dijonnaise (feminine)
- Time zone: UTC+01:00 (CET)
  - Summer (DST): UTC+02:00 (CEST)
- INSEE/Postal code: 21231 /21000
- Website: www.dijon.fr
- ^{1} French Land Register data, which excludes lakes, ponds, glaciers > 1 km^{2} (0.386 sq mi or 247 acres) and river estuaries.

Dijon (UK: /ˈdiːʒɒ̃/, US: /diːˈʒoʊn/; French: [diʒɔ̃]; Burgundian: Digion) (Note: Translated in other notable and relevant languages: German: Dision [ˈdɪzi̯oːn] (dated); Italian: Digione [diˈdʒoːne]; Latin: Diviō or Diviodūnum [dɪwɪ.ɔˈduːnũː]; Lombard: Digion [diˈdʒũː]) is a city and the prefecture of the Côte-d'Or department of the Bourgogne-Franche-Comté region in eastern France. As of 2023, the population of the commune was 161,830, making it the most populous commune in Bourgogne-Franche-Comté.

The earliest archaeological finds within the city limits of Dijon date to the Neolithic period. Dijon later became a Roman settlement named Divio, located on the road between Lyon and Paris. The province was home to the Dukes of Burgundy from the early 11th until the late 15th century, and Dijon became a place of tremendous wealth and power, one of the great European centres of art, learning, and science.

The city has retained varied architectural styles from many of the main periods of the past millennium, including Capetian, Gothic, and Renaissance. Many still-inhabited townhouses in the city's central district date from the 18th century and earlier. Dijon's architecture is distinguished by, among other things, toits bourguignons (Burgundian polychrome roofs) made of glazed terracotta tiles of various colours arranged in geometric patterns.

Dijon holds an International and Gastronomic Fair every year in the northern-hemisphere autumn. Dijon also hosts every three years the international flower show Florissimo. Dijon has become famous for Dijon mustard, which originated in 1856, when Jean Naigeon of Dijon substituted verjuice, the acidic "green" juice of not-quite-ripe grapes, for vinegar in the traditional mustard recipe. Dijon is a green city with an important tertiary sector, as well as a regional economic centre with a diversified fabric, a traditional food-processing center (Dijon crême de cassis and kir, gingerbread, Lanvin chocolate...) and a renowned pharmaceutical sector.

On 4 July 2015, UNESCO registered the historical centre of the city as a World Heritage site, as one of the components of the "Climats, terroirs of Burgundy" site, because of its historical importance in regulating the system of wine production in Burgundy.

== History ==
The earliest archaeological finds within the city limits of Dijon date to the Neolithic period. Dijon later became a Roman settlement called Divio, which may mean sacred fountain, located on the road from Lyon to Paris. Saint Benignus, the city's apocryphal patron saint, is said to have introduced Christianity to the area before being martyred.

This province was home to the Dukes of Burgundy from the early 11th until the late 15th century, and Dijon was a place of tremendous wealth and power and one of the great European centres of art, learning and science with Dijon Abbey playing an influential role. The Duchy of Burgundy was key in the transformation of medieval times toward early modern Europe. The Palace of the Dukes of Burgundy now houses the Hôtel de Ville (City Hall) and the musée des Beaux-Arts (Museum of Fine Arts).

In 1513, Swiss and Imperial armies invaded Burgundy and besieged Dijon, which was defended by the governor of the province, Louis II de la Trémoille. The siege was extremely violent, but the town succeeded in resisting the invaders. After long negotiations, Louis II de la Trémoille managed to persuade the Swiss and the Imperial armies to withdraw their troops and also to return three hostages who were being held in Switzerland. During the siege, the population called on the Virgin Mary for help and saw the town's successful resistance and the subsequent withdrawal of the invaders as a miracle. For those reasons, in the years following the siege, the inhabitants of Dijon began to venerate Notre-Dame de Bon-Espoir (Our Lady of Good Hope). Although a few areas of the town were destroyed, there are nearly no signs of the siege of 1513 visible today. However, Dijon's museum of fine arts has a large tapestry depicting this episode in the town's history: it shows the town before all subsequent destruction (particularly that which occurred during the French Revolution) and is an example of 16th-century art.

A system of purified water for the citizens of Dijon was constructed by Henry Darcy a quarter-century before Paris was so supplied.

Dijon was also occupied by anti-Napoleonic coalitions in 1814, by the Prussian army in 1870–71, and by Nazi Germany beginning in June 1940, during WWII, when it was bombed by US Air Force B-17 Flying Fortresses, before the liberation of Dijon by the French Army and the French Resistance, 11 September 1944.

From 12 to 16 June 2020, violent riots took place that were unprecedented in the city's history, although similar incidents on a smaller scale had preceded them in Nice, Rouen and Troyes. In Dijon, violent clashes broke out in one neighborhood over several days when drug dealers and Chechens clashed.

== Geography ==
Dijon is situated at the heart of a plain drained by two small converging rivers: the Suzon, which crosses it mostly underground from north to south, and the Ouche, on the southern side of town. Farther south is the côte, or hillside, of vineyards that gives the department its name. Dijon lies 310 km (193 mi) southeast of Paris, 190 km (118 mi) northwest of Geneva, and 190 km (118 mi) north of Lyon.

=== Climate ===
Dijon features an oceanic climate (Cfb) with continental influence under the Köppen climate classification. The city is highly influenced by its position far inland in Northeastern France. Thus, winters are cool to cold with moderate frosts at night and thawing conditions during the day while summers are warm to hot and humid with frequent thunderstorms.

Comparison of local Meteorological data with other cities in France
Town	Sunshine (hours/yr)	Rain (mm/yr)	Snow (days/yr)	Storm (days/yr)	Fog (days/yr)
National average	1,973	770	14	22	40
Dijon	1,852.8	759.8	23.2	27.5	66.8
Paris	1,661	637	12	18	10
Nice	2,724	767	1	29	1
Strasbourg	1,693	665	29	29	56
Brest	1,605	1,211	7	12	75

Climate data for Dijon - Longvic (DIJ), elevation: 219 m (719 ft) (1991–2020 normals, extremes 1921−present)
Month	Jan	Feb	Mar	Apr	May	Jun	Jul	Aug	Sep	Oct	Nov	Dec	Year
Record high °C (°F)	16.8 (62.2)	21.1 (70.0)	24.9 (76.8)	29.0 (84.2)	34.4 (93.9)	39.1 (102.4)	39.5 (103.1)	39.3 (102.7)	34.2 (93.6)	28.3 (82.9)	21.6 (70.9)	17.5 (63.5)	39.5 (103.1)
Mean daily maximum °C (°F)	5.6 (42.1)	7.6 (45.7)	12.5 (54.5)	16.2 (61.2)	20.0 (68.0)	24.2 (75.6)	26.7 (80.1)	26.2 (79.2)	21.7 (71.1)	16.1 (61.0)	9.7 (49.5)	6.1 (43.0)	16.1 (61.0)
Daily mean °C (°F)	2.7 (36.9)	3.8 (38.8)	7.5 (45.5)	10.7 (51.3)	14.6 (58.3)	18.5 (65.3)	20.8 (69.4)	20.4 (68.7)	16.4 (61.5)	11.8 (53.2)	6.5 (43.7)	3.4 (38.1)	11.4 (52.5)
Mean daily minimum °C (°F)	−0.2 (31.6)	0.0 (32.0)	2.6 (36.7)	5.2 (41.4)	9.2 (48.6)	12.8 (55.0)	14.9 (58.8)	14.6 (58.3)	11.0 (51.8)	7.6 (45.7)	3.3 (37.9)	0.7 (33.3)	6.8 (44.2)
Record low °C (°F)	−21.3 (−6.3)	−22.0 (−7.6)	−15.3 (4.5)	−5.3 (22.5)	−3.3 (26.1)	0.8 (33.4)	2.8 (37.0)	4.3 (39.7)	−1.6 (29.1)	−4.9 (23.2)	−10.6 (12.9)	−20.8 (−5.4)	−22.0 (−7.6)
Average precipitation mm (inches)	56.8 (2.24)	42.9 (1.69)	48.2 (1.90)	57.5 (2.26)	76.1 (3.00)	65.8 (2.59)	64.9 (2.56)	62.0 (2.44)	56.4 (2.22)	73.6 (2.90)	77.6 (3.06)	61.6 (2.43)	743.4 (29.27)
Average precipitation days (≥ 1.0 mm)	10.6	8.4	9.2	9.1	10.3	8.9	7.8	7.9	7.9	9.8	11.1	11.3	112.3
Average relative humidity (%)	88	82	74	70	73	69	65	68	74	85	89	90	77
Average dew point °C (°F)	1 (34)	1 (34)	2 (36)	5 (41)	9 (48)	12 (54)	13 (55)	13 (55)	11 (52)	9 (48)	5 (41)	2 (36)	7 (45)
Mean monthly sunshine hours	60.8	95.1	159.8	193.7	215.5	240.3	256.9	239.7	190.9	118.0	66.5	52.9	1,890
Source 1: Meteociel
Source 2: Time and Date

== Sights ==
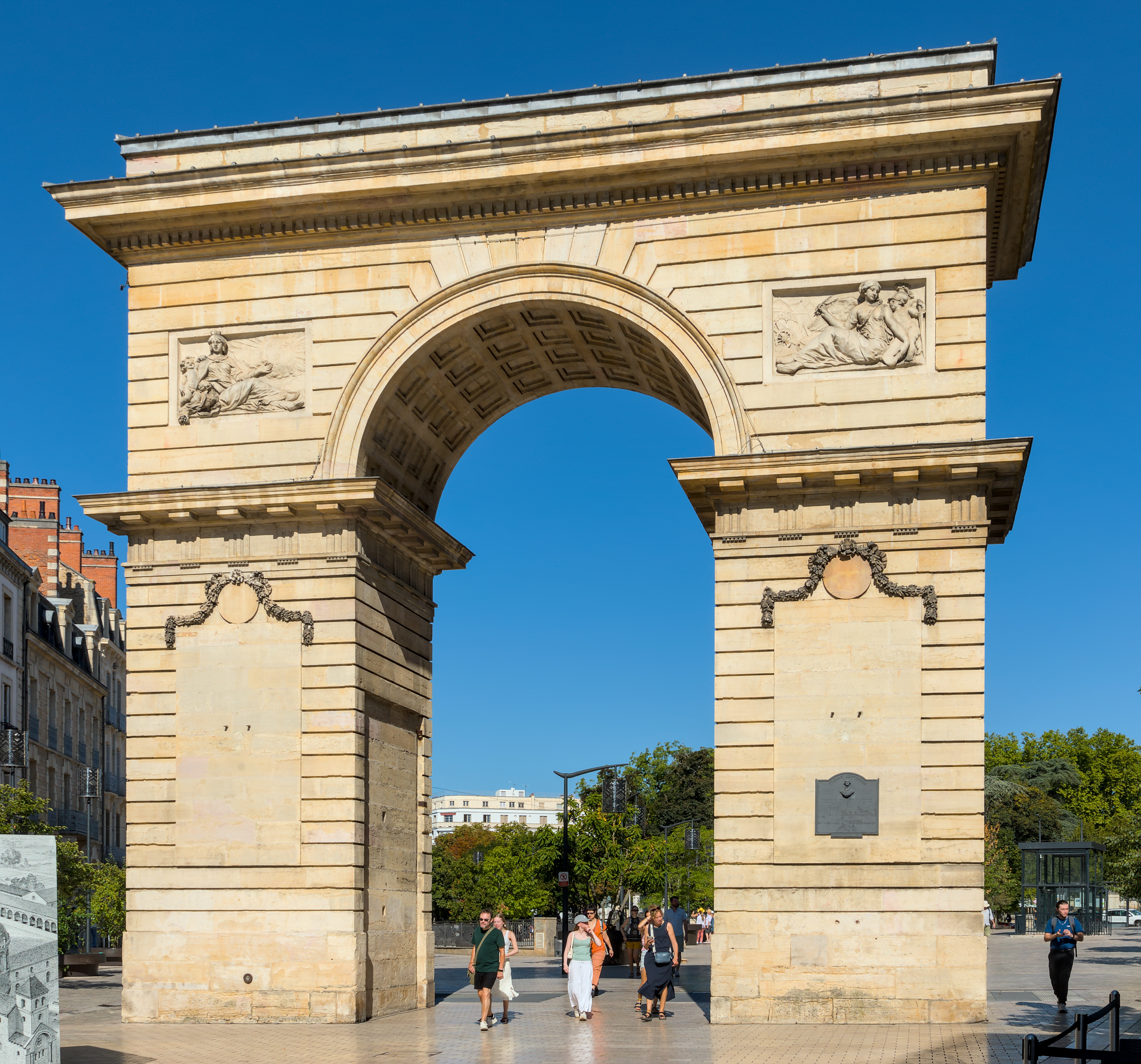
Porte Guillaume (Guillaume Gate), Place Darcy (Darcy Square), in the center of Dijon.

Dijon has a large number of churches, including Notre Dame de Dijon, St. Philibert, St. Michel, and Dijon Cathedral, dedicated to the apocryphal Saint Benignus, the crypt of which is over 1,000 years old. The city has retained varied architectural styles from many of the main periods of the past millennium, including Capetian, Gothic and Renaissance. Many still-inhabited townhouses in the city's central district date from the 18th century and earlier. Dijon architecture is distinguished by, among other things, toits bourguignons (Burgundian polychrome roofs) made of glazed terracotta tiles of various colours arranged in geometric patterns.

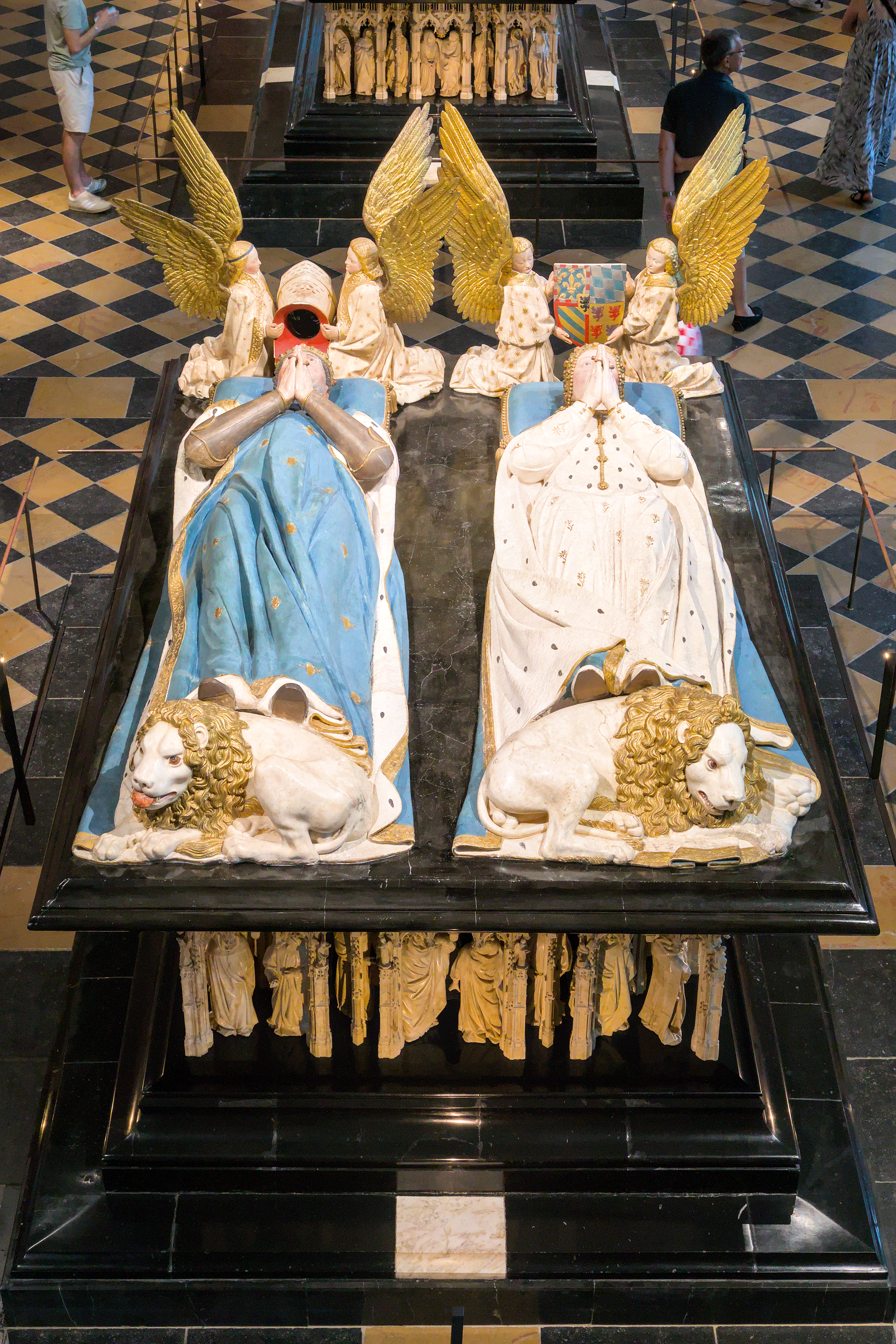
Tomb of John the Fearless and Margaret of Bavaria, inside the Palace of the Dukes of Burgundy.

Dijon was largely spared the destruction of wars such as the 1870 Franco-Prussian War and the Second World War, despite the city being occupied. Therefore, many of the old buildings such as the half-timbered houses dating from the 12th to the 15th centuries (found mainly in the city's core district) are undamaged, at least by organized violence.

Dijon is home to many museums, including the Musée des Beaux-Arts de Dijon in part of the Ducal Palace (see below). It contains, among other things, ducal kitchens dating back to the mid-15th century, and a substantial collection of primarily European art, from Roman times through the present.

Among the more popular sights is the Ducal Palace, the Palais des Ducs et des États de Bourgogne or "Palace of the Dukes and the States of Burgundy" (47°19′19″N 5°2′29″E), which includes one of only a few remaining examples of Capetian period architecture in the region. Many art interested visitors flock to the Puits de Moïse or Well of Moses, a monumental sculpture by Claus Sluter.

The church of Notre Dame is famous for both its art and architecture. Popular legend has it that one of its stone relief sculptures, an owl (la chouette) is a good-luck charm: visitors to the church touch the owl with their left hands to make a wish. (The current carving was restored after it was damaged by vandalism in the night of 5 and 6 January 2001).

The Grand Théâtre de Dijon, built in 1828 and one of the main performing venues of the Opéra de Dijon, was declared a monument historique of France in 1975. It was designed by the Dijon-born architect Jacques Cellerier (1742–1814) in the Neo-classical style with an interior modelled on Italian opera houses.

== Transport ==
=== Roads ===
Dijon is located approximately 300 km (190 mi) southeast of Paris, about three hours by car along the A38 and A6 motorways. The A31 provides connections to Nancy, Lille and Lyon. The A39 connects Dijon with Bourg-en-Bresse and Geneva, the A36 with Besançon, Mulhouse and Basel.

=== Water transport ===
The Canal de Bourgogne passes through the heart of Dijon and creates a navigable route to Paris in the north-west via the river Yonne, a tributary of the river Seine, and to the Saône river 25 km to the south-east. The canal joins the Saône at Saint-Jean-de-Losne which is the barging centre of France and Europe. In addition to the connection to the Atlantic via the Seine it has navigable water connections to the Mediterranean—via the Saône to the Rhône river at Lyon and further south (ultimately west to the Atlantic via the Canal du Midi)—Germany and central Europe—via the Rhône-Rhine canal—plus west to the centre and river Loire via the Canal du Centre. These waterways were largely completed before the 19th century and were the main means of industrial transport until the railways began taking over in the mid-19th century. Today they form a water route for mostly pleasure craft between northern Europe and the south. For example the route through Dijon is popular with those sailing their boats from the United Kingdom to the Mediterranean.

=== Public transport ===
==== Trains ====
Dijon is an important railway junction for lines from Paris to Lyon and Marseille, and the east–west lines to Besançon, Belfort, Nancy, Switzerland, and Italy. The Dijon-Ville station is the main railway station, providing service to Paris-Gare de Lyon by TGV high-speed train (LGV Sud-Est), covering the 300 km (190 mi) in one hour and 40 minutes. For comparison, Lyon is 180 km (110 mi) away and two hours distant by standard train. The city of Nice takes about six hours by TGV and Strasbourg only 1 hour and 56 minutes via the TGV Rhin-Rhône. Lausanne in Switzerland is less than 150 km (93 mi) away or two hours by train. Dijon has a direct overnight sleeper/couchette service to Milan, Verona and Venice by the operator Thello. Numerous regional TER Bourgogne-Franche-Comté trains depart from the same station. There is another railway station east of the city centre, Dijon-Porte-Neuve station, on the line to Is-sur-Tille and Culmont-Chalindrey.

==== Trams ====
A tram on line 1 passing the Robert Poujade Auditorium and the Dijon Exhibition and Congress Centre

A new tram system opened in September 2012. Line T1 is an 8.5 kilometres (5.3 miles) line with 16 stations running west–east from the Dijon railway station to Quetigny. Line T2 opened in December 2012, an 11.5 km (7.1 miles) north–south line with 21 stations running between Valmy and Chenôve.

==== Air transport ====
Dijon is served by Dole–Jura Airport which is located 51 km (32 mi) south east of Dijon. However, the airport only provides flights to limited European destinations. The nearest airports are Geneva Airport, located 195 km (121 mi) to the south east and Lyon-Saint Exupéry Airport, located 211 km (131 mi) to the south, both airports provide more domestic and international destinations.

== Culture ==
Dijon holds its International and Gastronomic Fair every year in autumn. With over 500 exhibitors and 200,000 visitors every year, it is one of the ten most important fairs in France. Dijon is also home, every three years, to the international flower show Florissimo.

Dijon has numerous museums such as the Musée des Beaux-Arts de Dijon, the Musée Archéologique, the Musée de la Vie Bourguignonne, the Musée d'Art Sacré, and the Musée Magnin. It also contains approximately 700 hectares of parks and green space, including the Jardin botanique de l'Arquebuse.

Dijon is home to the prominent contemporary art centre Le Consortium, a fine-arts school (ENSA), as well as a number of art galleries like the Fonds régional d'art contemporain, which holds a permanent collection including pieces by locally established artist Yan Pei-Ming.

Apart from the numerous bars, which sometimes have live bands, some popular music venues in Dijon are : Le Zénith de Dijon, La Vapeur, l'Espace autogéré des Tanneries and l'Atheneum.

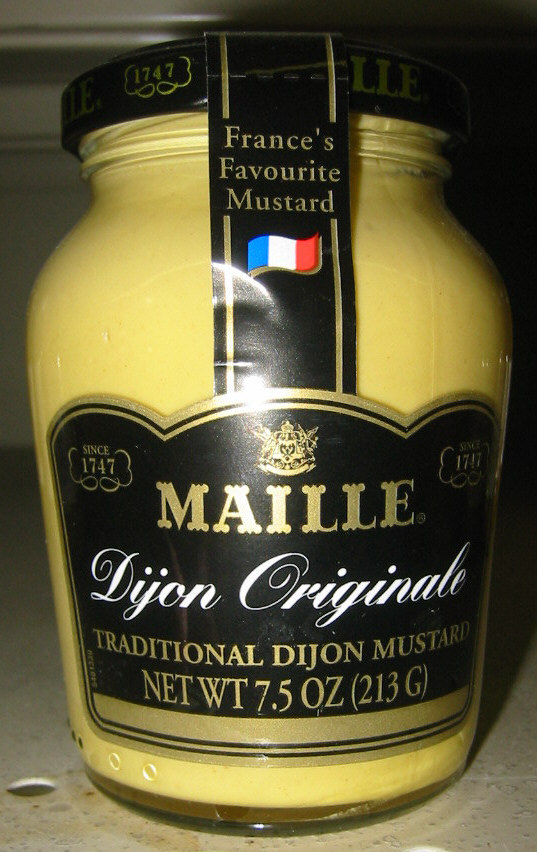
A jar of Dijon mustard

Dijon mustard originated in 1856, when Jean Naigeon of Dijon substituted verjuice, the acidic "green" juice of not-quite-ripe grapes, for vinegar in the traditional mustard recipe. In general, mustards from Dijon today contain white wine rather than verjuice. Dijon mustard is not necessarily produced near Dijon, as the term is regarded as genericized under European Union law, so that it cannot be registered for protected designation of origin status. Most Dijon mustard (brands such as Amora or Maille) is produced industrially and over 90% of mustard seed used in local production is imported, mainly from Canada. In 2008, Unilever closed its Amora mustard factory in Dijon. Dijon mustard shops sell exotic or unusually-flavoured mustard (fruit-flavoured, for example), often sold in decorative hand-painted faience (china) pots.

Burgundy is a world-famous wine growing region, and notable vineyards, such as Vosne-Romanée and Gevrey-Chambertin, are within 20 minutes of the city center. The town's university boasts a renowned enology institute. The road from Santenay to Dijon is known as the "route des Grands Crus", where eight of the world's top ten most expensive wines are produced, according to Wine Searcher.

The city is also well known for its crème de cassis, or blackcurrant liqueur, used in the drink known as "Kir", named after former mayor of Dijon canon Félix Kir, a mixture of crème de cassis with white wine, traditionally Bourgogne Aligoté.

=== Media ===
France 3 Bourgogne, part of France's national public television network, France Télévisions, has a television station in the city which broadcast local news, current affairs, sport and weather to across the Bourgogne-Franche-Comté region.

Local radio is provided by ici Bourgogne, K6FM, 21 Radio, and Radio Shalom Dijon, a station for Jewish sensitivity in the city.

Le Bien Public is the city's local daily newspaper.

== Sport ==
Dijon is home to Dijon FCO, a football club with a men's team competing in the Championnat National and a women's team competing in the Division 1 Féminine.

Dijon has a its own (Pro A) basketball club, JDA Dijon Basket. The Palais des Sports de Dijon serves as playground for the team and hosted international basketball events such as the FIBA EuroBasket 1999 in the past.

Dijon is also home to the Dijon Ducs ice hockey team, who play in the Magnus League.

To the northwest, the race track of Dijon-Prenois hosts various motor sport events. It hosted the Formula 1 French Grand Prix on five occasions from 1974 to 1984.

== Colleges and universities ==
- Dijon hosts the main campus of the University of Burgundy
- École nationale des beaux-arts de Dijon
- European Campus of Sciences Po Paris
- Agrosup Dijon
- Burgundy School of Business

== Population ==
Historical population

Year	Pop.	±% p.a.
1793	20,760	—
1800	18,888	−1.34%
1806	22,026	+2.59%
1821	22,397	+0.11%
1831	25,352	+1.25%
1836	24,817	−0.43%
1841	26,184	+1.08%
1846	27,543	+1.02%
1851	32,253	+3.21%
1856	33,493	+0.76%
1861	37,074	+2.05%
1866	39,193	+1.12%
1872	42,573	+1.39%
1876	47,939	+3.01%
1881	55,453	+2.95%
1886	60,855	+1.88%
1891	65,428	+1.46%
1896	67,736	+0.70%
1901	71,326	+1.04%

Year	Pop.	±% p.a.
1906	74,113	+0.77%
1911	76,847	+0.73%
1921	78,578	+0.22%
1926	83,815	+1.30%
1931	90,869	+1.63%
1936	96,257	+1.16%
1946	100,664	+0.45%
1954	112,844	+1.44%
1962	135,694	+2.33%
1968	145,357	+1.15%
1975	151,705	+0.61%
1982	140,942	−1.05%
1990	146,703	+0.50%
1999	149,867	+0.24%
2007	151,543	+0.14%
2012	152,071	+0.07%
2017	156,920	+0.63%
2023	161,830	+0.51%

Source: EHESS and INSEE (1968–2023)

== Personalities ==
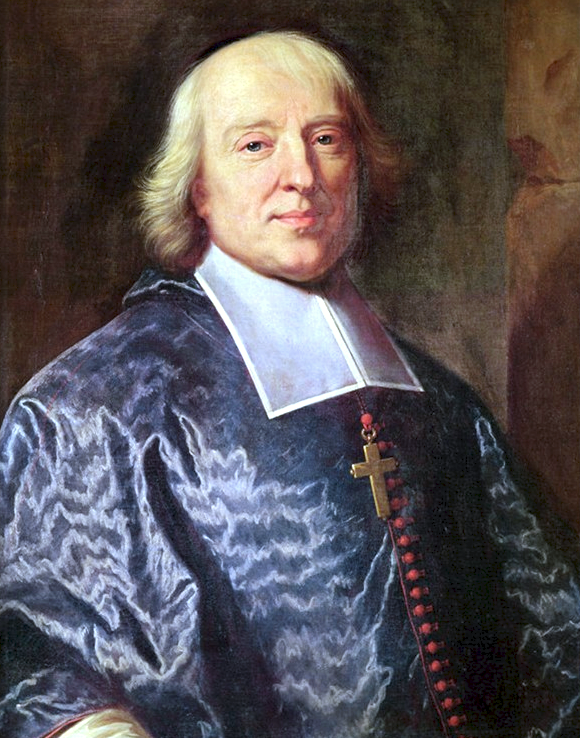
Jacques Bossuet

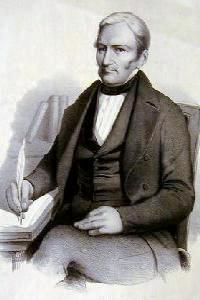
Étienne Cabet

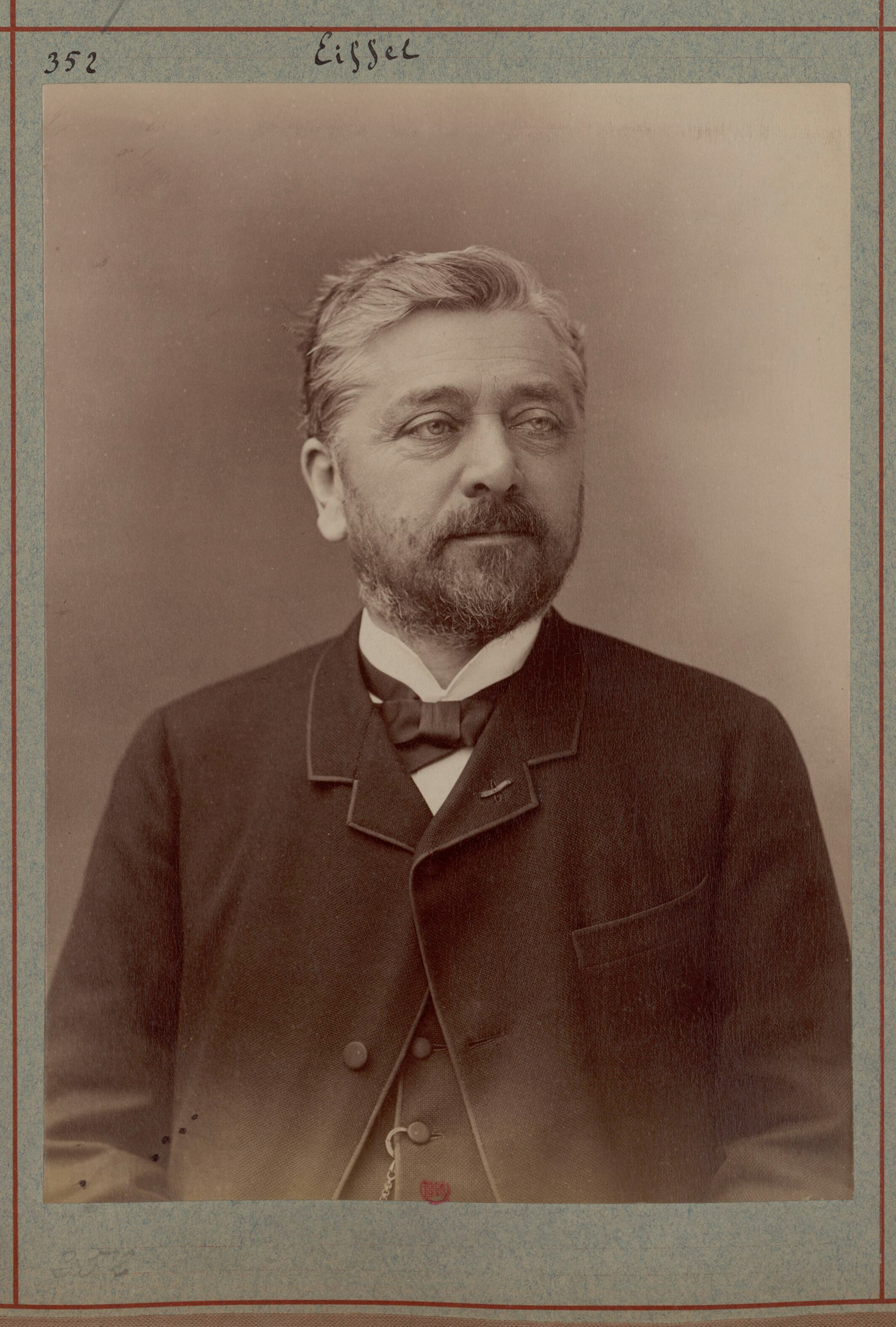
Gustave Eiffel

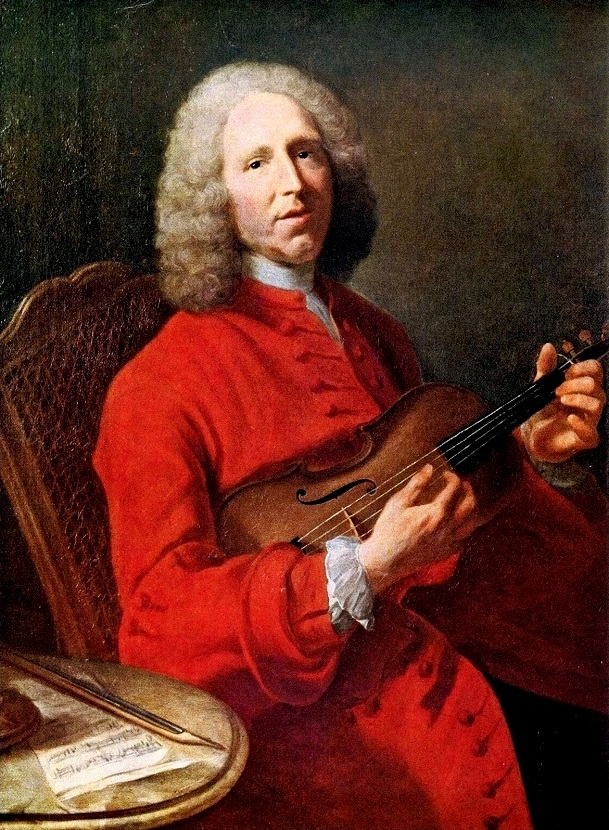
J.P.Rameau

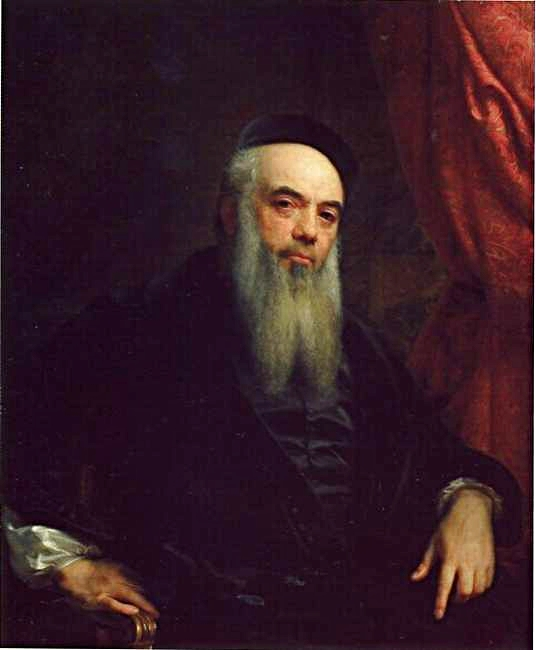
François Rude

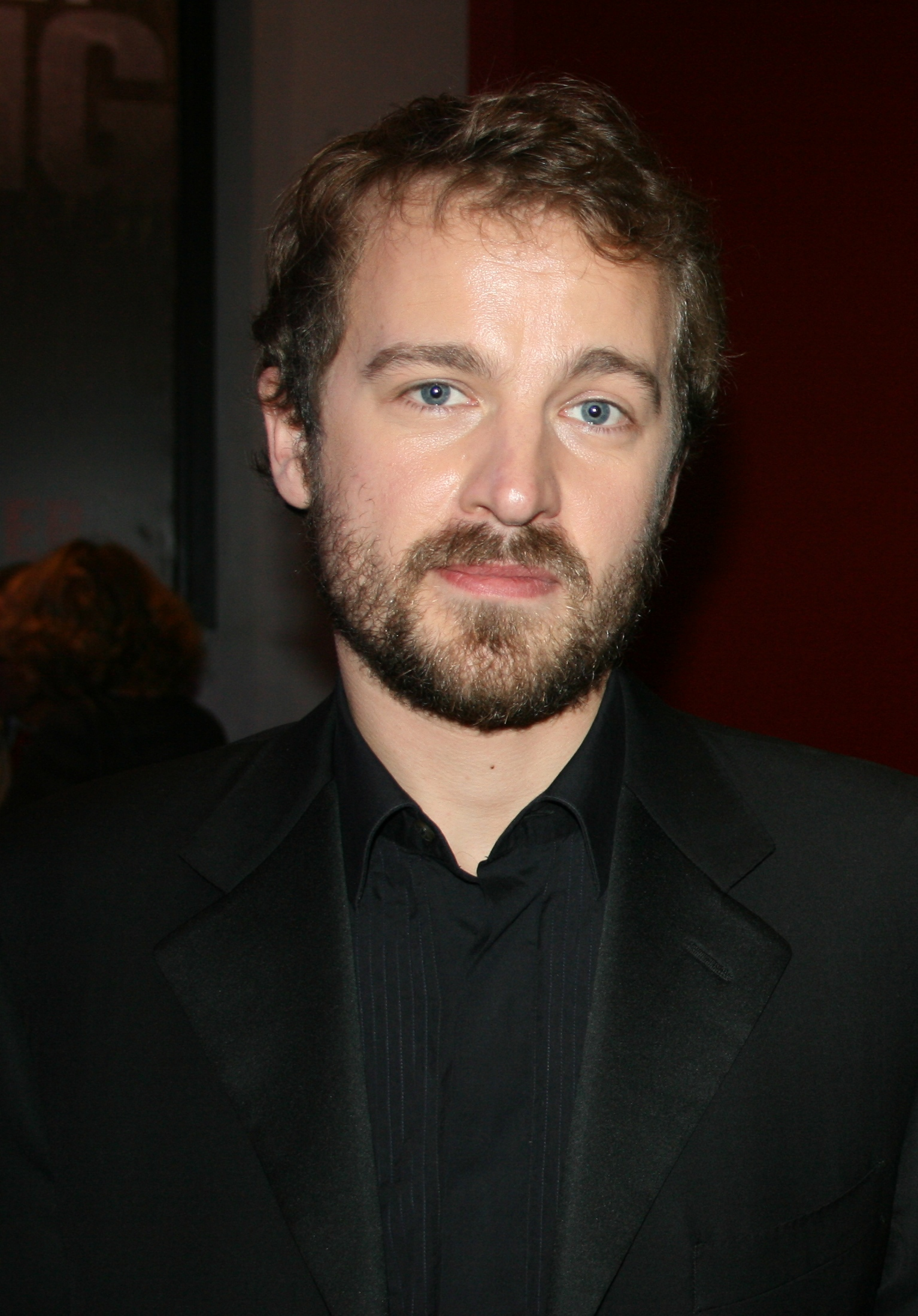
Jocelyn Quivrin
- Henry of Burgundy (c. 1066–1112), Count of Portugal, father of King Afonso I of Portugal
- Charles the Bold (1433–1477), Duke of Burgundy
- Claude-Louis Navier (1785–1836), mechanical engineer & physicist
- Isabella of Portugal (1397-1471), Duchess of Burgundy
- Jean Le Fèvre (canon) (1493–1565), lexicographer
- John the Fearless (1371–1419), Duke of Burgundy
- Philip the Good (1396-1467), Duke of Burgundy
- Christian Allard (b. 1964), Member of the Scottish Parliament
- Claude Balbastre (1724–1799), composer
- Cécile Bart (born 1958), artist
- Loïs Boisson (b. 2003), professional tennis player
- Jean-Marc Boivin (1951–1990), extreme sports specialist
- Jacques-Bénigne Bossuet (1627–1704), bishop and theologist
- Madjid Bougherra (b. 1982), Rangers F.C. footballer
- Fabrice Brégier (born in 1961), businessman, Chief Operating Officer of Airbus
- Antoine Bret (1717–1792), French playwright
- Jean-Charles Brisard (born 1968), international consultant
- Thierry Caens (b. 1958), classical trumpeter
- Laurent Chambertin (b. 1966), volleyball player
- Jane Frances de Chantal (Jeanne–Françoise Frémiot, baronne de Chantal, 1572–1641), founder of the Visitation Order
- François Chaussier (1746–1828), physician
- Anne-Caroline Chausson (b. 1977), Olympic medalist in cycling
- Bernard Courtois (1777–1838), discoverer of the element iodine
- Edmond Debeaumarché (1906–1959), hero of the French Resistance
- Henry Darcy (1803–1858), engineer
- Jean-Jacques-Joseph Debillemont (1824–1879), conductor and operetta composer
- Alexandre Gustave Eiffel (1832–1923), engineer and architect
- Eugène Foveau (1886–1957), classical trumpeter
- Jean-Baptiste Gondelier (1792–1852), playwright
- Roger Guillemin (1924–2024), Nobel laureate in Physiology and Medicine
- Fernand Gutierrez (1950-2006), television chef and restauranteur
- Louis-Bernard Guyton de Morveau (1737–1816), chemist and politician famous for establishing modern chemical nomenclature
- Hermine Horiot (born 1986), classical cellist
- Jules Jacquot d'Andelarre (1803-1885), politician
- Claude Jade (1948–2006), actress
- Joseph Jacotot (1770–1840), educational philosopher
- François Jouffroy (1806–1882), sculptor
- Henri Legrand du Saulle (1830–1886), psychiatrist
- Alban Lenoir (born 1980), actor, stuntman, screenwriter
- Jean-Pierre Marielle (1932–2019), actor
- Charles Joseph Minard (1781–1870), civil engineer and first information graphics
- Julien Pillet (b. 1977), Olympic medalist in sabre fencer
- Charles Poisot (1822–1904), musicologist
- Nicolas Quentin (d. 1636), historical painter
- Jean-Philippe Rameau (1683–1764), composer
- Claude-François-Marie Rigoley, comte d'Ogny, (1756–1790), cellist
- François Rude (1784–1855), sculptor
- Elizabeth of the Trinity (Marie–Élisabeth Catez, 1880–1906), Carmelite nun and religious writer
- Vitalic (born as Pascal Arbez in 1976), electronic music artist

== Twin towns and sister cities ==
Dijon is twinned with:

- Białystok, Poland, since 1996
- Cluj-Napoca, Romania
- Mechelen, Belgium
- Chefchaouen, Morocco
- Dakar, Senegal
- Dallas, United States, since 1957
- Guimarães, Portugal
- Mainz, Germany, since 1958
- Prague 6, Czech Republic
- Reggio Emilia, Italy, since 1963
- Skopje, North Macedonia, since 1961
- Volgograd, Russia, since 1960
- York, United Kingdom, since 1953

== See also ==
- Communes of the Côte-d'Or department
- Radio Shalom Dijon
