= Jules Jacquot d'Andelarre =

French politician (1803–1885)

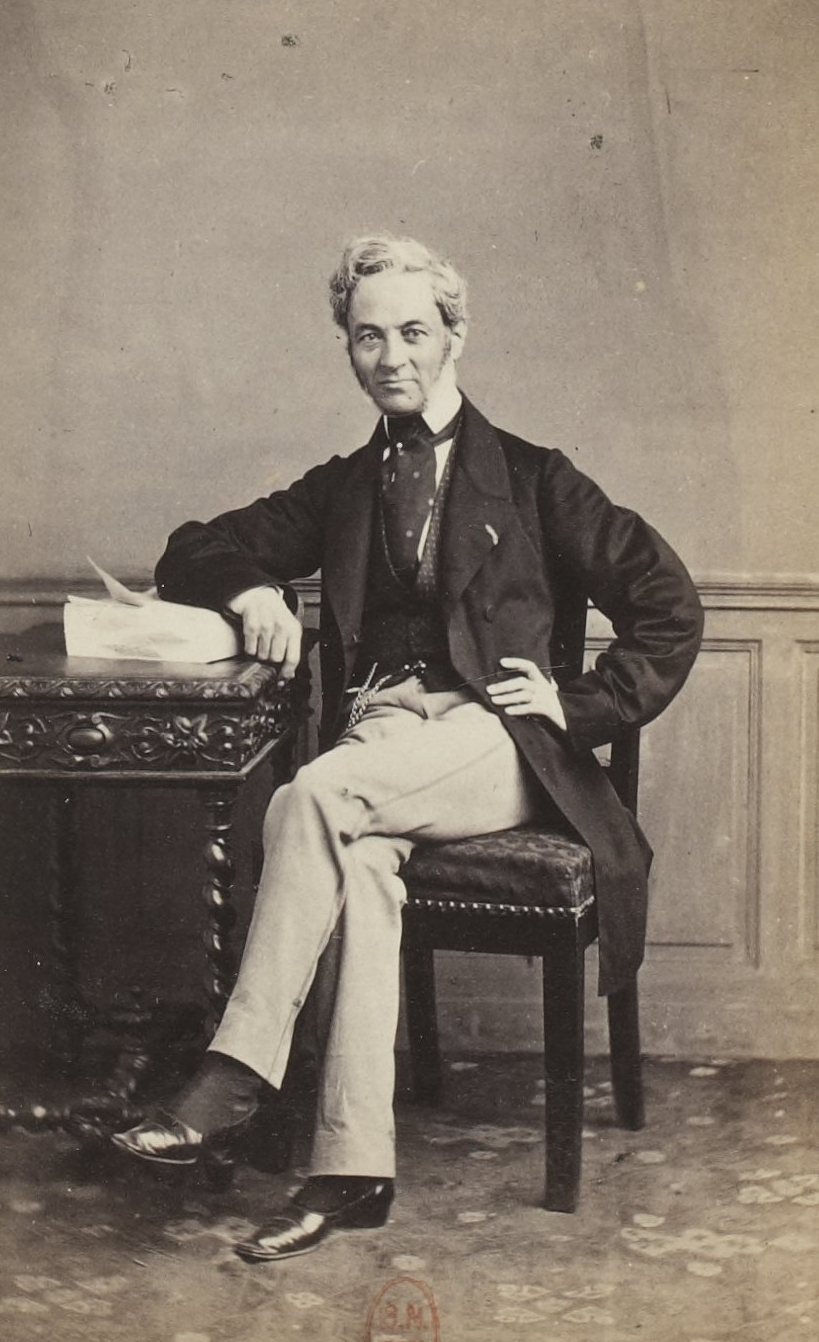
Jules Jacquot d'Andelarre in the 1850s

Jules Jacquot d'Andelarre (Dijon, 25 October 1803 – Andelarre, 26 November 1885) was a French Orléanist politician. He was member of the Corps législatif from 1852 to 1870 and member of the National Assembly from 1871 to 1876.

== Biography ==
A magistrate during the Bourbon Restoration in France, he resigned in 1830 and devoted himself to managing his estates. Mayor of Andelarre and general councilor for the canton of Vesoul between 1848 and 1871, he was deputy for Haute-Saône from 1852 to 1870. Initially an official candidate, he gradually distanced himself from the regime and joined the liberal third party. In 1871, he was representative of Haute-Saône, sitting with the Orléanist monarchists. He was registered at the Réservoirs meeting. In 1876, he was defeated in the legislative elections and withdrew from political life.

He was president of the Haute-Saône Society of Agriculture, Letters, Sciences, and Arts eight times: from 1842 to 1843, from 1845 to 1846, from 1848 to 1849, from 1850 to 1851, from 1852 to 1853, from 1854 to 1855, from 1857 to 1858, and from 1861 to 1862.
