= Nicolas Quentin =

French painter

Nicolas Quentin (died 1636) was a French historical painter.

Quentin lived at Dijon, and died there in 1636. His life has been too much neglected by biographers and critics, for his work had considerable originality. He appears to have had no regular master. The compiler of the catalogue of the Dijon Museum asserts that Nicolas Poussin, passing through Dijon and seeing his Communion of St. Catherine, exclaimed that if Quentin understood his own interests, and went to Italy for improvement, he would make his fortune.
