= Jean Le Fèvre (canon) =

16th-century French canon, translator, and lexicographer

- Born: 1493; Dijon, Burgundy, Kingdom of France
- Died: 1565 (aged 71–72)
- Occupations: Canon; translator; lexicographer
- Writing career
- Pen name: Jehan Lefèvre
- Language: French
- Notable works: Livret des Emblemes (1536); Dictionnaire des rimes françoises (posthumous, 1572)

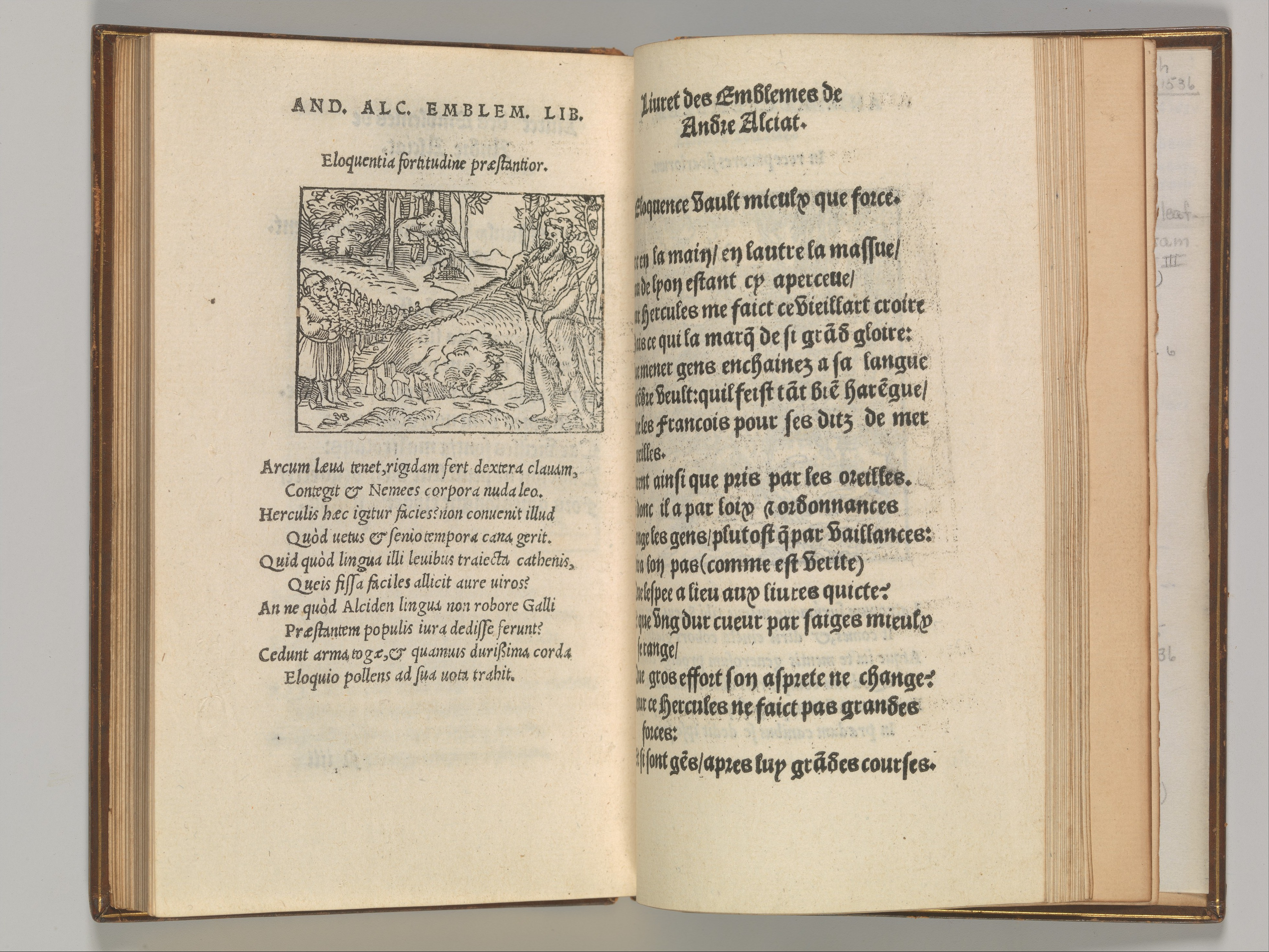
A page from the 1536 Livret Emblemes (Wechel).

Jean Le Fèvre (also Jehan Lefèvre; 1493–1565) was a French canon, translator, and lexicographer from Dijon. He is known for producing an early French verse translation of Andrea Alciato’s emblem book and for compiling a rhyming dictionary later published and expanded by his nephew Étienne Tabourot.

== Life ==
Le Fèvre was born in Dijon in 1493 and became a canon at Langres; later title-pages of works associated with him also describe him as a canon of Bar-sur-Aube.

== Works ==
=== Livret des Emblemes (1536) ===
Le Fèvre produced a French translation of Alciato’s Emblemata published in Paris in 1536 by Chrétien Wechel as Livret des Emblemes de maistre André Alciat. In this edition, the Latin text and the French translation are printed facing one another, and the work is presented as a bilingual publication. It has been described as the first French version of Alciato’s emblems.

=== Dictionnaire des rimes françoises (posthumous) ===
Le Fèvre compiled a rhyming dictionary that appeared posthumously in 1572 (and was reissued in expanded form in 1587), edited and augmented by his nephew Étienne Tabourot (Seigneur des Accords). A study of early French lexicography describes the Dictionnaire des rimes as the first dictionary of the French language and argues that the published form of the work largely reflects Tabourot’s editorial intervention.

The same study notes that Le Fèvre died in 1565 before he could publish a separate Inventaire ou répertoire de mots français (an inventory or repertory of French words).

== See also ==
- Andrea Alciato
- Emblem book
- Étienne Tabourot
- Rhyming dictionary
