= Radio Shalom Copenhagen =

Jewish radio station in Denmark

Radio Shalom Copenhagen is a local associative radio station of Jewish sensitivity based in Copenhagen, Denmark.
