= Radio Shalom Dijon =

French radio station

Radio Shalom Dijon is a local associative radio station of Jewish sensitivity based in Dijon, France. As of 2006, its president is Denis Tenenbaum. Its programming includes Judaic heritage, culture, history, music, current events and activities etc.

It started its programming in 1992 and got the go ahead from CSA in August 2007. It broadcast on 97.1 FM in Dijon and 99.5 FM in Besançon.
