= Radio Shalom Sweden =

Local radio station in Stockholm, Sweden

Radio Shalom Sweden is a local associative radio station of Jewish sensitivity based in Stockholm, Sweden.
