= Émiland Gauthey =

Émiland Marie Gauthey
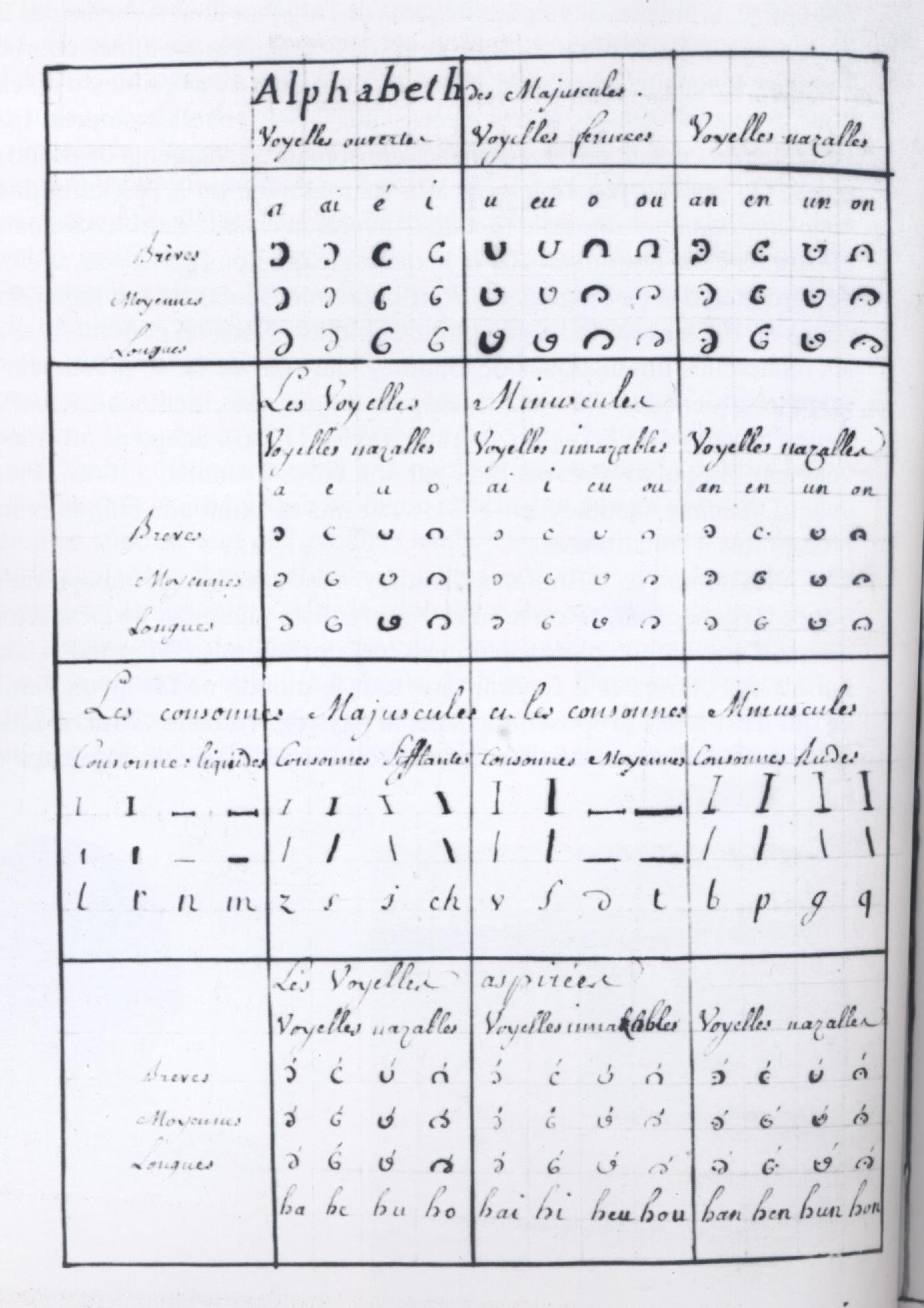
- New alphabet devised by Gauthey
- Born: 3 December 1732; Chalon-sur-Saône, Burgundy, France
- Died: 14 July 1806 (aged 73); Paris, France
- Education: École des pages du Roi; École nationale des ponts et chaussées
- Engineering career
- Discipline: Civil engineering
- Employer: États de Bourgogne
- Projects: Canal du Centre
- Awards: Legion d'Honneur (1804)

Émiland Marie Gauthey (3 December 1732 in Chalon-sur-Saône – 14 July 1806 in Paris) was a French mathematician, civil engineer and architect. As an engineer for the Estates of Burgundy (French: États de Bourgogne), he was the creator of a great deal of the region's civil infrastructure, such as the Canal du Centre between Digoin and Chalon-sur-Saône (1784–1793), bridges including those at Navilly (1782–1790) and Gueugnon (1784–1787), and buildings such as the Eglise Saint-Pierre-et-Saint-Paul ("Church of St Peter and St Paul") at Givry (1772 – 1791) and the theatre at Chalon-sur-Saône.

Gauthey became Chief Engineer of the États de Bourgogne in 1782, on the death of his predecessor and close collaborator, Thomas Dumorey. After the French Revolution, he held several important posts in the Haute administration des Ponts-et Chaussées ("High Commission for Bridges and [High]ways") in Paris. He was awarded the Légion d'honneur in 1804 on its creation by Napoleon Bonaparte. From 1805 until his death, he was the highest-ranked engineer in France.

== Biography ==
Émiland Marie Gauthey was born at Chalon-sur-Saône on 3 December 1732 into a provincial petty bourgeois family. His father, Pierre Gauthey, was the local doctor: and his mother, Louise (or Louyse) née was born at Chagny on 27 August 1700 as the dauter of Emiland Lafouge, a company lawyer and Official Receiver for the salt store in Toulon-sur-Arroux.

From 1740 to 1748, he studied with brilliance at the Jesuit college in Chalon. At the age of sixteen, after his father died, he continued his studies at Versailles under the auspices of an uncle who was Professor of Mathematics at the École des pages du roi (English: School for Royal Pages).

He continued his education under the architect Gabriel Dumont before entering the École royale des ponts et chaussées (which became the École nationale des ponts et chaussées, literally "National School of Bridges and [High]Ways"), which had been newly created and was under the direction of the notable engineer Jean-Rodolphe Perronet. He met with the Dumont architect Jacques-Germain Soufflot, and started a lifelong friendship. He consulted Soufflot on the construction of the dome of Sainte-Geneviève, which became the Panthéon.

Graduating in 1758, he was awarded the post of deputy engineer at Chalon-sur-Saône, under Thomas Dumorey. He would wait twenty-four years, until Dumorey's death in 1782, to become the Chief Engineer of the États de Bourgogne (States of Burgundy) and to makeDijon his home. Shortly after, he was named Director.General of Burgundy Canals (French: Directeur général des canaux de Bourgogne) in 1783.

A brilliant technician, he was an exponent of the spirit of the Age of Enlightenment and of the Encyclopédie ou Dictionnaire raisonné des sciences, des arts et des métiers ("Encyclopaedia or Rational Dictionary of Sciences, Arts and Crafts"), as evidenced by his investigative Essay on Philosophical Language (French: Essai sur la langue philosophique) of 1774 – in which he envisages a kind of language of universal graphical signs like stenography –; and in his use of scientific advances in the building trade. His monumental works on building, Mémoire sur l’application de principes de mécanique de la construction des voûtes et des Dômes ("On the application of mechanical principles in the construction of vaults and domes") and Mémoire sur les canaux de navigation ("On Navigation Canals") posthumously published by his nephew, became standard reference works.

His civil engineering works, such as the bridges of Gueugnon, Navilly and Chalon-sur-Saône, helped to transform transportation methods and accelerated the Industrial Revolution in 19th-century Burgundy. It was in this forward-looking spirit that he participated in improving river navigation and building canals. He collaborated in the project to build a canal in Burgundy between the rivers Yonne and Saône (completed much later, in 1832) and he puis se consacre au canal de Franche-Comté de Saint-Jean-de-Losne/Saint-Symphorien-sur-Saône à Dole (also known as the French: Liaison Saône-Doubs): this part of the project to connect the Rhine with the Rhône, built between 1783 and 1803, is also known as the French: canal de Monsieur because it was opened by Louis V Joseph de Bourbon-Condé, lately Prince and Governor of Burgundy.

But his master work, "The greatest public work of the 18th Century", was the Canal du Centre (or "Canal du Charolais"), (built 1783–1793) between Digoin and Chalon-sur-Saône. Over 112 km (70 mi) with 62 locks, it connected the Loire to the Saône, thus creating the primary route for boats from the English Channel to the Mediterranean Sea (the Loire having been connected to the Seine by the Canal de Briare).

Gauthey remained interested in development in Chalon-sur-Saône, his home town, where he rebuilt the quayside and built a theatre. These constructions are among many examples of neoclassical style in the area, including the dome of the pharmacy in the town, the churches at Givry and Louhans, the town hall at Tournus and the Château de Clermont-Montoison at Chagny.

Changes after the French Revolution brought Émiland Gauthey honours and high office: he was named the first Inspecteur Général des Ponts et Chaussées in 1791. At the age of 60 he moved to Paris, married his cousin and adopted his nephew Claude-Louis Navier, one of the most brilliant mathematicians and engineers of the early 19th century. in 1801 he became a member of the Conseil général des ponts et chaussées en 1801 and in 1805 its vice-president. He worked on Somme-Escaut link and several developments in Paris, such as a new water supply which would become the Canal de l'Ourcq), and projects on the Seine bridges and the Passerelle des Arts, built by Jacques Dillon.

The French Consulate awarded him the civil Légion d'honneur on its first issue on 1804, and he was to be promoted to Commander but died suddenly, in Paris, on 14 July 1806. Perhaps surprisingly, his place of death is unknown, but it is likely to be in a Parisian cemetery.

== Works ==
=== Bridges ===
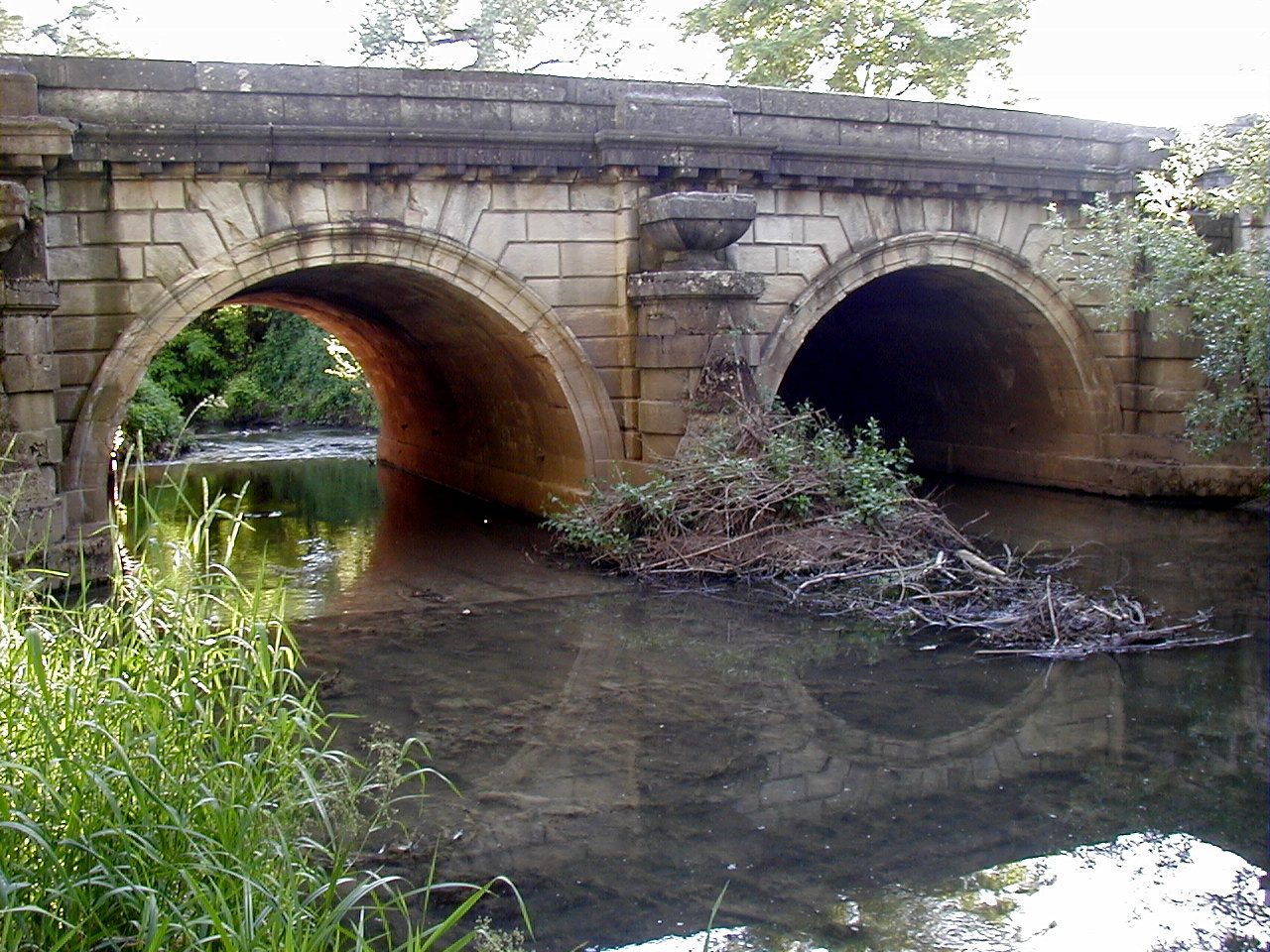
Pont Gathey ("Gauthey Bridge") on the river Thalie

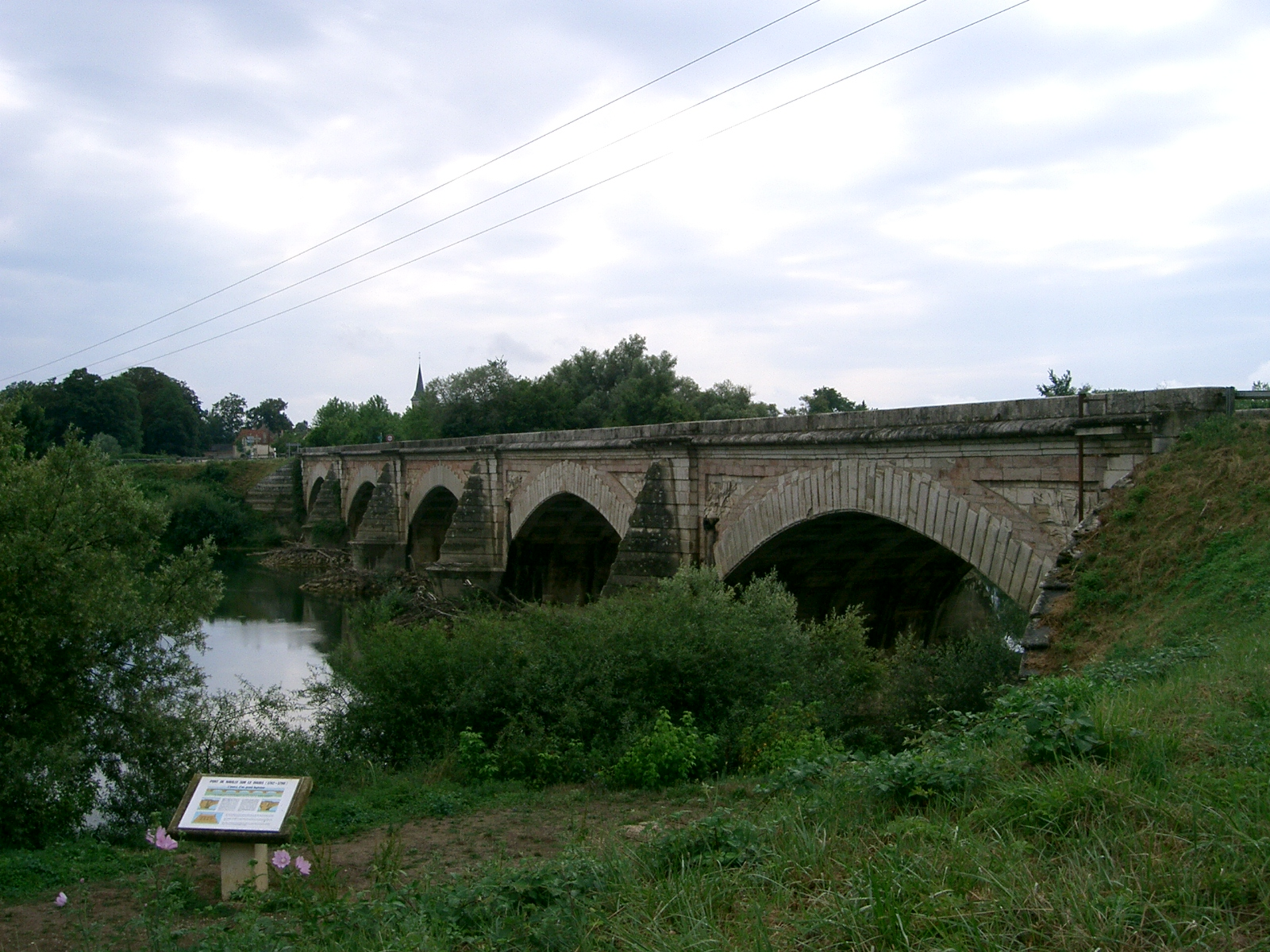
Navilly Bridge in Saône-et-Loire

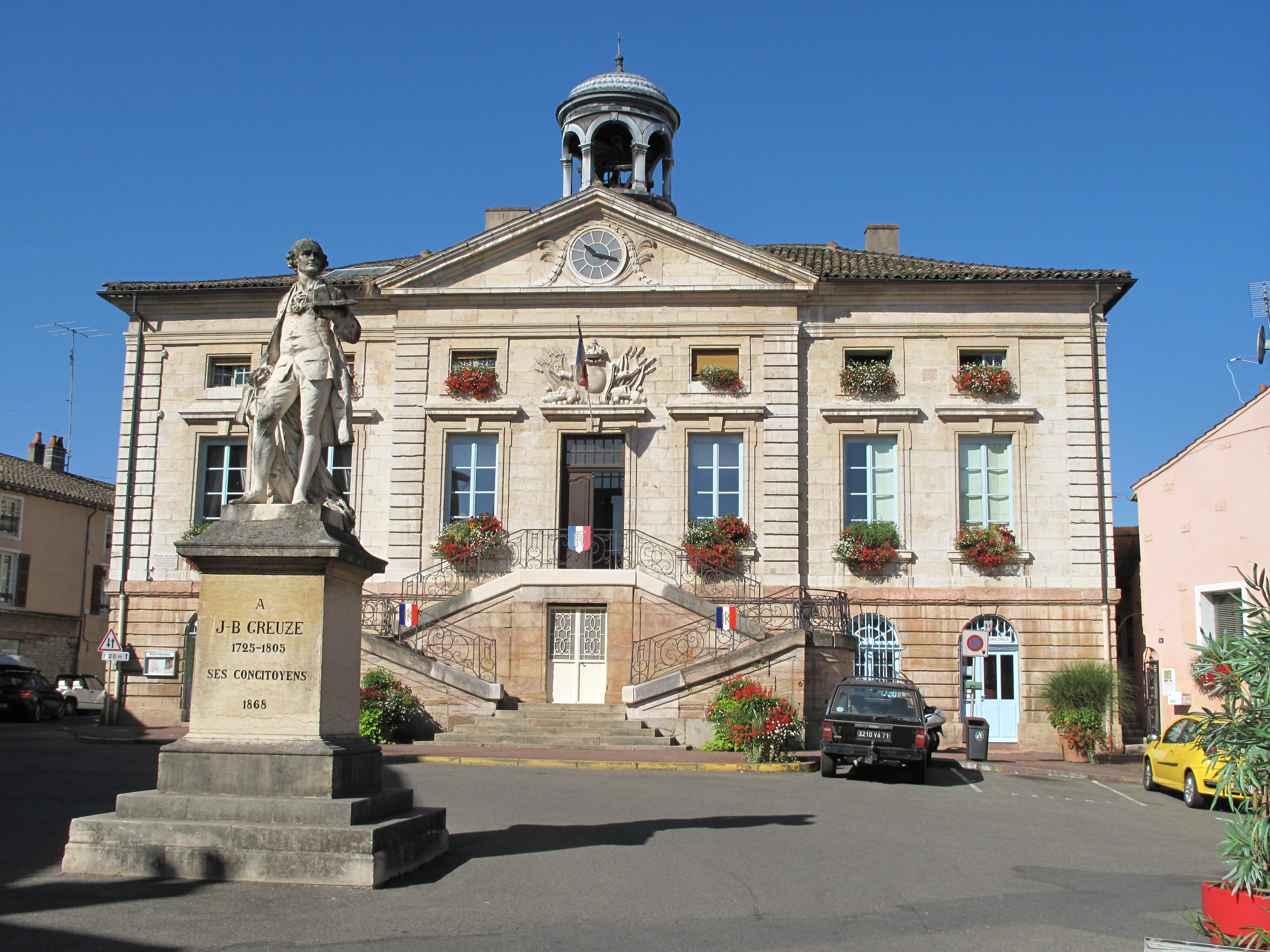
Tournus Town Hall

- Pont de Cravant ("Cravant Bridge") (1760) in the Yonne department. 56 metres (61 yd) long over 3 arched spans.
- Pont Gauthey or Pont de la Thalie ("Gauthey Bridge" or "Thalie Bridge") at Chatenoy-le-Royal, Saône-et-Loire (1770), Gauthey's first sole project. 10 metres (11 yd) over 2 arched spans.
- Pont de Pierre ("Stone Bridge") (1781–1787) over the Baulches Stream carrying Rue Nationale 6, in Yonne: road bridge of 14 metres (15 yd).
- Pont sur la Bourbince ("Bridge over the Bourbince") (1786–1789) at Blanzy, Saône-et-Loire
- Pont sur la Guyotte ("Bridge over the Guyotte") (1786–1789) at Navilly, Saône-et-Loire: one arch with a span of 12.7 metres (14 yd 0 ft)
- Bellevesvre Bridge (1787), Saône-et-Loire: arched road bridge over the Brenne with a total length of 30 metres (33 yd)
- Gueugnon Bridge (1787), Saône-et-Loire (71): arched bridge 60.87 metres (66 yd 1.7 ft) long and 7.10 metres (7 yd 2.3 ft) wide, with a rise of 1.9 metres (6.2 ft) and a tallest arche of 12.9 metres (14 yd 0 ft).
- Navilly Bridge (1782–1790), Saône-et-Loire: arched bridge over the river Doubs, 156 metres (171 yd) over 5 spans
- at Chalon-sur-Saône, the Chavannes (or "Echavannes") Bridge which connects it to Saint-Marcel (road bridge of seven spans completed in 1790), including widening the bed of the river Saône with a French: canal de décharge ("relief channel"). and renovation of the Pont Saint-Laurent (enlargement of the mediaeval bridge and decoration of the 7 arches of 13 metres (43 ft) with obelisks, completed in 1791). More-or-less destroyed in 1944 and rebuilt from scratch in 1950.

=== Buildings ===
- Tournus Town Hall (1771)
- Givry (Saône-et-Loire) Church (1772–1791)
- Rebuilding of one wing of the Palais des ducs et des États de Bourgogne de Dijon (1776)
- The Obélisque de Dijon (1786)
- Chalon-sur-Saône Theatre (1778)
- The churches of Saint-Germain-du-Plain and Barizey (1778)
- Restoration of the Château de Chagny (Saône-et-Loire) (1780)
- Bourbon-Lancy Town Hall (1782)

=== Canals ===
- Canal de Franche-Comté from Saint-Jean-de-Losne/Saint-Symphorien-sur-Saône to Dole (also known as French: Liaison Saône-Doubs) (1783–1803)
- Canal du Centre (also known as the Canal du Charolais), built 1783–1793 between Digoin and Chalon-sur-Saône, connecting the Loire and the Saône

== Legacy ==
- In 1808 a bust of him was carved by Guillaume Boichot, also from Chalon-sur-Saône, and exhibited at the Musée Vivant-Denon in the town.
- Since 1864, the Rue Gauthey in the 17th arrondissement of Paris has borne his name.
- A school in Chalon-sur-Saône bears his name.

== Sources ==
- Girardi, Marie-Thérèse (1995). Émiland Gauthey, 1732-1806 : le grand bâtisseur bourguignon [Émiland Gauthey, 1732-1806: The Great Burgundy Builder] (in French). Lycée polyvalent Émiland Gauthey Paru.
- Coste, Anne (1993). Un Ingénieur des Lumières, Émiland-Marie Gauthey' (in French). Paris: Presses de l’École nationale des Ponts et Chaussées. ISBN 2859782044.
- De Dartein (1907–1912). Etudes sur les ponts de pierre [Studies on Stone Bridges] (in French). Vol. 4.
- De Dartein (Third Quarter 1904). "La vie et l'œuvre d'Émiland Gauthey" [The life and work of Émiland Gauthey]. Annales des Ponts et Chaussées (in French).
- Gelis, Paul (1970). La vie et l'œuvre architecturale de Gauthey [The life and architectural work of Gauthey] (in French). Paris: Axium.
- Laurent, Philippe (April–June 1987). "Émiland Gauthey, ingénieur en Bourgogne" [Émiland Gauthey, Engineer in Burgundy]. Monuments Historiques (in French) (150–151): 67–72.
