= Givry =

Givry may refer to:

== Places ==
Belgium

- Givry, Hainaut, village in the municipality of Quévy, Hainaut province
- Givry, Luxembourg, village in the municipality of Bertogne, Luxembourg province

France

- Givry, Ardennes, in the Ardennes department
- Givry, Saône-et-Loire, in the Saône-et-Loire department
- Givry, Yonne, in the Yonne department
- Givry-en-Argonne, in the Marne department
- Givry-lès-Loisy, in the Marne department

== People ==
- Edgar Givry (born 1953), French actor
- Anne d'Escars de Givry (1546–1612), French Benedictine churchman, supporter of the Catholic League of France, and cardinal
- Claude de Longwy de Givry (1481–1561), French bishop and cardinal

== Other ==
- Givry wine, a Burgundy wine
