= Thomas Dumorey =

French civil engineer and architect

Thomas Dumorey (1717 at Chalon-sur-Saône, Burgundy – 1782 at Dijon, Burgundy) was a French civil engineer and architect. He was the chief ingénieur des ponts et chaussées for the States of Burgundy (French: États de Bourgogne).

== Biography ==
In 1706, the États de Bourgogne ("States of Burgundy") had decided to appoint a chief Ingénieur des ponts et chaussées (literally "Engineer of Bridges and [High]ways", more naturally in Modern English "Civil Engineer") for the province. The first was a Mr. Jerson, who was replaced in November 1710 by a Mr. Morin, an architect. He held the post until 1736, when the States replaced him with a Mr. Bonnichon. When Bonnichon fell ill, Dumorey was appointed as his assistant. Dumorey became the Chief Engineer himself in 1750.

In 1735, he drew up plans for the town hall at Chalon-sur-Saône, which was completed in 1742.

In 1752, the States of Burgundy decided to create two assistant chief posts. Dumorey became the chief engineer of Ponts et Chaussées. In March 1752, "commissioning" was given over to Joseph Pierre Antoine, an alumnus of the École des Ponts et Chaussées, and to Charles Joseph Le Jolivet, a student.

In 1758 a third assistant post was created and awarded to Émiland Marie Gauthey.

He was the architect of the Château d'Arcelot from 1761 to 1764.

In 1762 he worked on a plan for the provision of water to the public water fountains in Dijon, as a contractor for Dufour, the superintendent of Villeneuve-sous-Charigny.

In 1768 he built a water fountain in Marjonzin, near the hamlet of Étroyes, where he owned land. This project perhaps replaced another, one to build a pump to supply the city of Chalon from the River Saône. That project was abandoned. (Note: In 1988, some citizens suggested moving the fountain from the middle of the field in which it had lain abandoned to the entrance to the commune.)

Since 1751, ideas had been floated by the États de Bourgogne to study the improvement of the ports and quays along the River Saône. Dumorey submitted simplified plans in 1762, but not much happened. In 1770, superintendent Amelot asked the Mayor of Chalon, Claude Perrault, for a feasibility study with Gauthey and the town's tradesmen to ensure the project was workable. On 5 January 1771 the superintendent signed an order that Dumorey could continue the project "in the presence of interested parties" to give detailed estimates for the projected works. The decision was finalised in 1774, and in 1775, Dumorey took over responsibility for the project, with Gauthey. In 1777, Dumorey signed a contract for the Quai des Messageries. Work was completed in 1780 under Gauthey.

Between 1772 and 1778, with Gauthey, he planned the enlargement and rebuilding of the electoral chamber oaround the cour de Flore ("Floral Court") of the Palace of the States of Dijon. At this time, Dumorey was the States' chief architect.

In 1776, together with Gauthey, he designed the Fontaine aux Dauphins at Givry (Saône-et-Loire).

He made studies for the Pont Joly ("Joly Bridge") at Semur-en-Auxois. The foundation stone was laid on 12 September 1779, and construction lasted until 1786.

In 1780, Dumorey drew up plans for the barque bridge at Louhans.

With Gauthey, Dumorey drew up plans for the Pont de Pierre ("Stone Bridge") over the Baulch stream on the road from Monéteau to Auxerre (both in the Yonne department in Burgundy). This was built between 1781 and 1786.

== Sources ==
- Coste, Anne; Picon, Antoine (1993). Sidot, Francis (ed.). Un Ingénieur des Lumières. Émiland-Marie Gauthey (in French). Paris: Presses de l'École nationale des Ponts et Chaussées. ISBN 2859782044.

== See also ==
- Canal de Bourgogne
