= 1765 in architecture =

The year 1765 in architecture involved some significant architectural events and new buildings.

== Buildings and structures ==
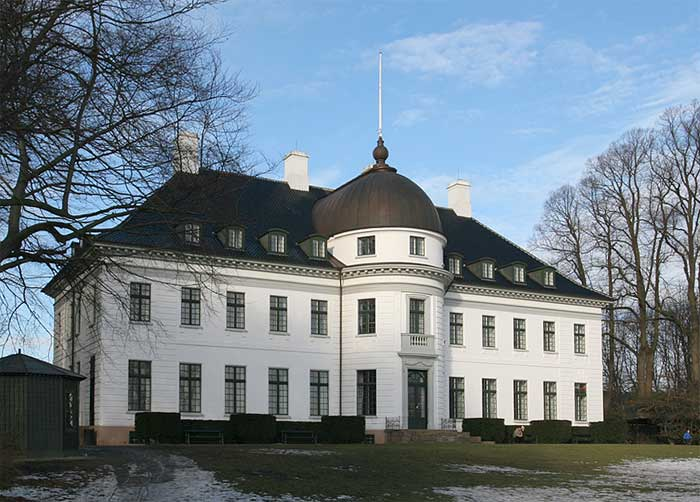
Bernstorff Palace

=== Buildings completed ===
- May – Bernstorff Palace, Copenhagen, Denmark, is completed.
- Kedleston Hall in Derbyshire, England, designed by Robert Adam.
- Château d'Arcelot on the Côte-d'Or of France is completed.
- Remodelling of the Summer Archbishop's Palace in Bratislava by F. A. Hillebrandt is completed.

== Births ==
- July 20 – Peter Nicholson, Scottish architect, engineer and mathematician (died 1844)

== Deaths ==
- October 21 – Giovanni Paolo Pannini, Italian painter and architect (born 1691)
