= Claude-Louis Navier =

French engineer and physicist (1785–1836)

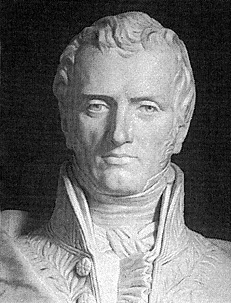
- Bust of Claude Louis Marie Henri Navier at the École Nationale des Ponts et Chaussées
- Born: Claude Louis Marie Henri Navier; 10 February 1785; Dijon, Kingdom of France
- Died: 21 August 1836 (aged 51); Paris, Kingdom of France
- Education: École Nationale des Ponts et Chaussées
- Known for: Structural analysis Navier–Stokes equations Navier–Cauchy equations
- Scientific career
- Fields: Mathematical physics
- Workplaces: École Nationale des Ponts et Chaussées; École polytechnique French Academy of Sciences
- Academic advisors: Joseph Fourier

Claude-Louis Navier (born Claude Louis Marie Henri Navier; French: [klod lwi maʁi ɑ̃ʁi navje]; 10 February 1785 – 21 August 1836) was a French civil engineer, affiliated with the French government, and a physicist who specialized in continuum mechanics.

The Navier–Stokes equations refer eponymously to him, with George Gabriel Stokes.

== Biography ==
After the death of his father in 1793, Navier's mother left his education in the hands of his uncle Émiland Gauthey, an engineer with the Corps of Bridges and Roads (Corps des Ponts et Chaussées). In 1802, Navier enrolled at the École polytechnique, and in 1804 continued his studies at the École Nationale des Ponts et Chaussées, from which he graduated in 1806. He eventually succeeded his uncle as Inspecteur general at the Corps des Ponts et Chaussées.

He directed the construction of bridges at Choisy, Asnières and Argenteuil in the Department of the Seine, and built a footbridge to the Île de la Cité in Paris. His 1824 design for the Pont des Invalides failed to leave a safety margin on top of his calculations, and after cracking the bridge had to be dismantled, destroying Navier's bridge-building reputation. He was chastised by a government committee for relying too much on mathematics.

In 1824, Navier was admitted into the French Academy of Sciences. In 1830, he took up a professorship at the École Nationale des Ponts et Chaussées, and in the following year succeeded the exiled Augustin Louis Cauchy as professor of calculus and mechanics at the École polytechnique.

== Contributions ==
Navier formulated the general theory of elasticity in a mathematically usable form (1821), making it available to the field of construction with sufficient accuracy for the first time. In 1819 he succeeded in determining the zero line of mechanical stress, finally correcting Galileo Galilei's incorrect results, and in 1826 he established the elastic modulus as a property of materials independent of the second moment of area. Navier is therefore often considered to be the founder of modern structural analysis.

His major contribution, however, remains the Navier–Stokes equations (1822), central to fluid mechanics.

His name is one of the 72 names inscribed on the Eiffel Tower.

== Selected publications ==
- Rapport à Monsieur Becquey et Mémoire sur les ponts suspendus. Notice sur le pont des Invalides, chez Carillan Gœury, Paris, 1830 (read online (French language))
- Résumé des leçons données à l'École des ponts et chaussées sur l'application de la mécanique à l'Établissement des constructions et des machines, tome 1, Première partie contenant des leçons sur la résistance des matériaux, et sur l'établissement des constructions en terre, en maçonnerie et en charpente, chez Carilian-Gœury 2nd édition), Paris, 1833 (read online (French language))
- Résumé des leçons données à l'École des ponts et chaussées sur l'application de la mécanique à l'Établissement des constructions et des machines, tome 2, Deuxième partie, leçons sur le mouvement et la résistance des fluides, la conduite et la distribution des eaux, Troisième partie, leçons sur l'établissement des machines, chez Carilian-Gœury 2nd édition), Paris, 1838 (read online (French language))
- De l'établissement d'un chemin de fer entre Paris et Le Havre, imprimerie Firmin-Didot, 1826 (read online (French language))
- Mémoire sur les lois du mouvement des fluides, lu à l'Académie royale des Sciences le 18 mars 1822, dans Mémoires de l'Académie des sciences de l'Institut de France - Année 1823, Gauthier-Villars, Paris, 1827, p. 389-440 (read online (French language))
