= Givry wine =

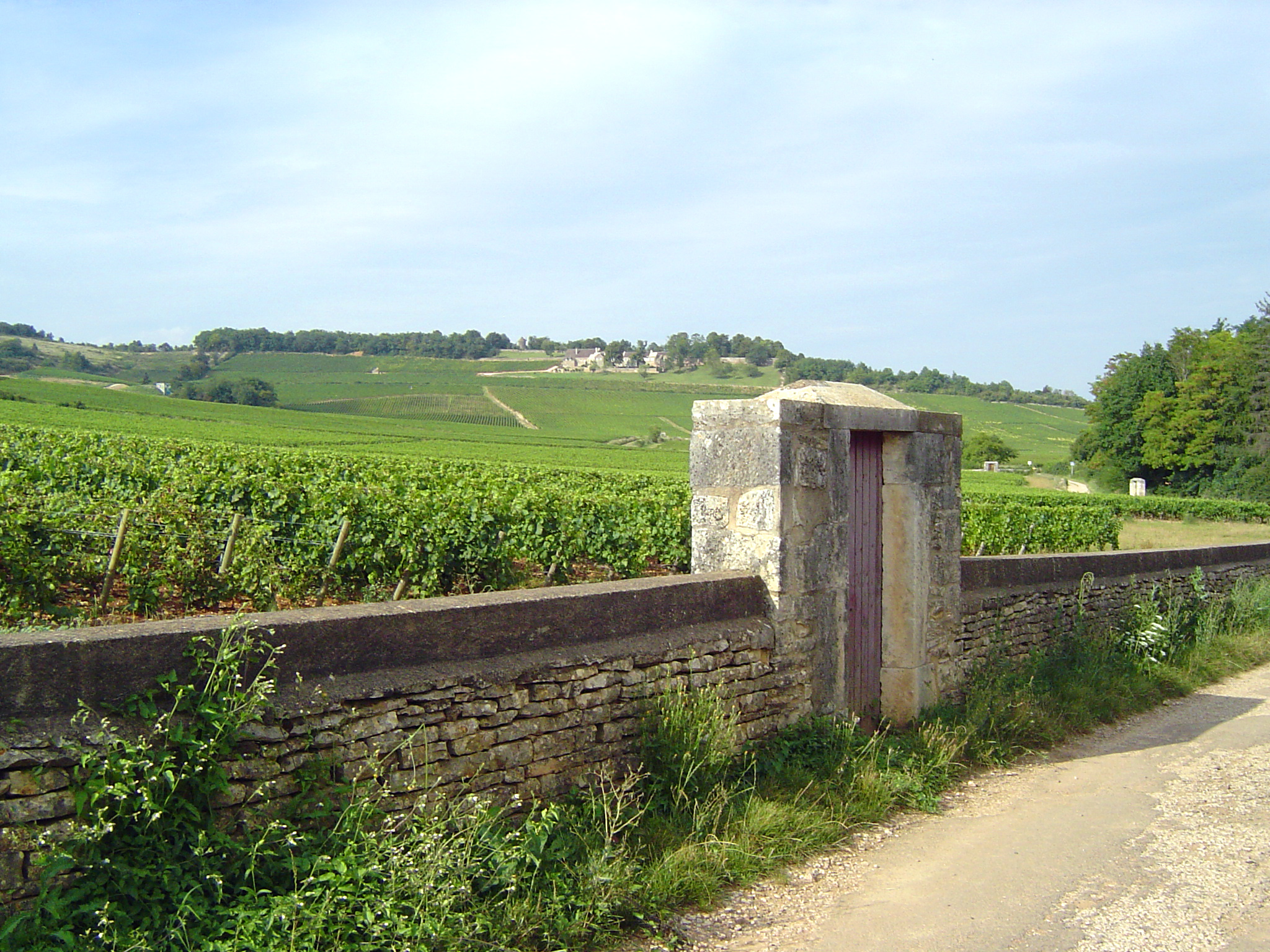
Vineyards in Givry

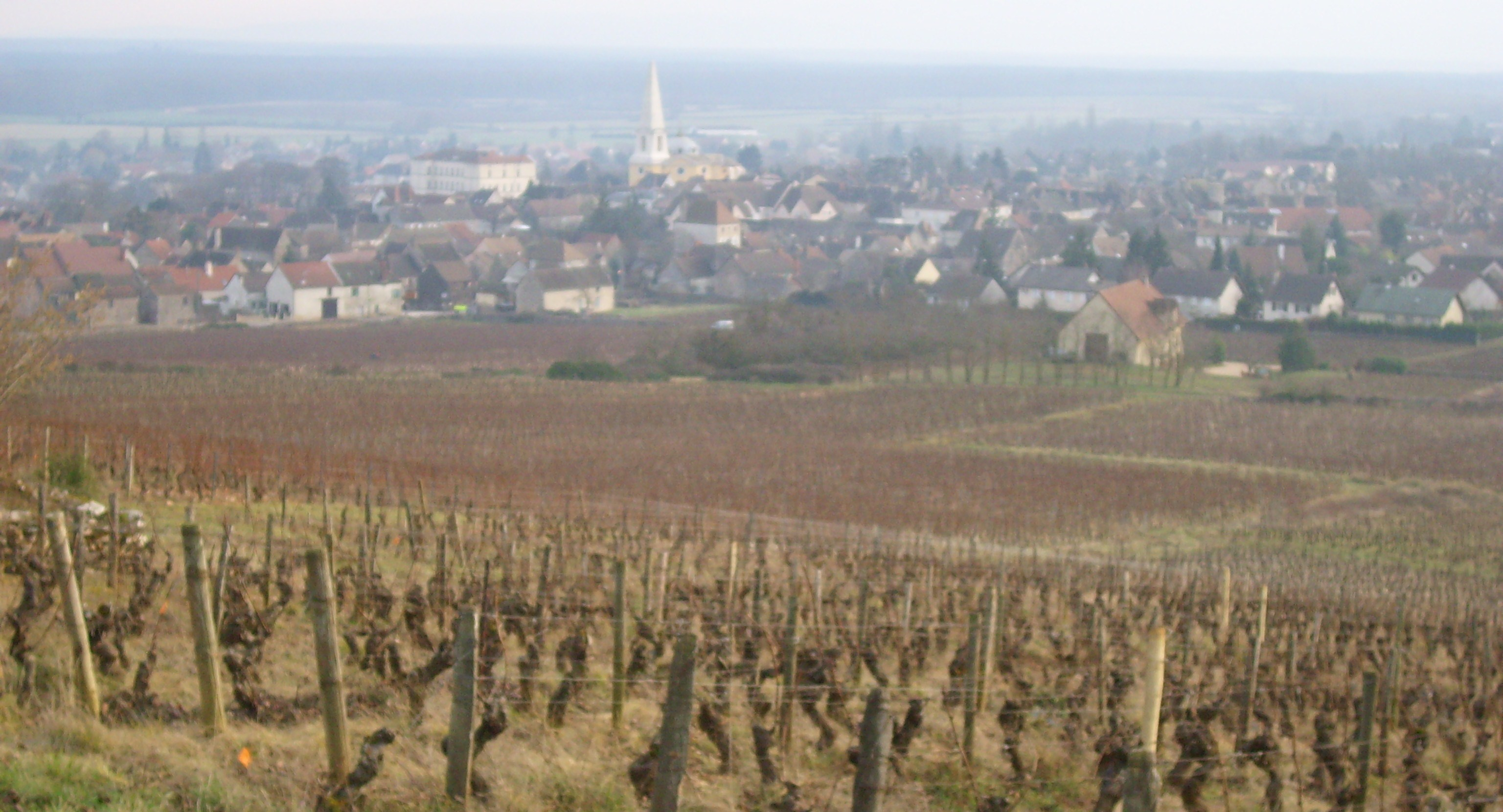
Givry with vineyards in the foreground.

Givry wine is produced in the communes of Givry, Dracy-le-Fort and Jambles in the Côte Chalonnaise subregion of Burgundy. The Appellation d'origine contrôlée (AOC) Givry may be used for red and white wine with respectively Pinot noir and Chardonnay as the main grape variety. The production of red wine dominates, with almost 80 per cent. There are 27 Premier Cru vineyards within Givry AOC, but no Grand Cru vineyards exist in this part of Burgundy. The AOC was created in 1946.

== Production ==
In 2008, 268.98 hectares (664.7 acres) of vineyard surface was in production for Givry at village and Premier Cru level, and 12,576 hectoliter of wine was produced, of which 10,278 hectoliter red wine and 2,298 hectoliter white wine. Some 45.46 hectares (112.3 acres) of this area was used for the white wines. The total amount produced corresponds to just under 1.7 million bottles, of which just under 1.4 million bottles of red wine and just over 300,000 bottles of white wine.

== Premiers Crus ==
There are 38 climats within the Givry AOC classified as Premier Cru vineyards. Their wines are designated Givry Premier Cru + vineyard name, or as just Givry Premier Cru, in which case it is possible to blend wine from several Premier Cru vineyards within the AOC.

In 2008, 108.13 hectares (267.2 acres) of the total Givry vineyard surface consisted of Premier Cru vineyards, of which 96.68 hectares (238.9 acres) red and 9.45 hectares (23.4 acres) white Givry Premier Cru. The annual production of Premier Cru wine, as a five-year average, is 4,668 hectoliter of red wine and 521 hectoliter of white wine.

The Premier Cru vineyards are the following:

- Clos du Cras Long
- Clos du Vernoy
- Les Grandes Vignes
- Clos Marceaux
- Les Grands Prétans
- Clos de la Baraude
- Petit Marole
- Cellier aux Moines
- Clos Charlé
- Clos Jus
- Servoisine
- Les Bois Chevaux
- Clos Saint-Pierre
- Clos Saint-Paul
- Clos Salomon
- Clos Marole
- A Vigne Rouge
- Crauzot
- En Cras Long
- La Baraude
- En Choue
- La Grande Berge
- La Plante
- Le Paradis
- Le Petit Prétan
- Le Vigron
- Les Bois Gautiers

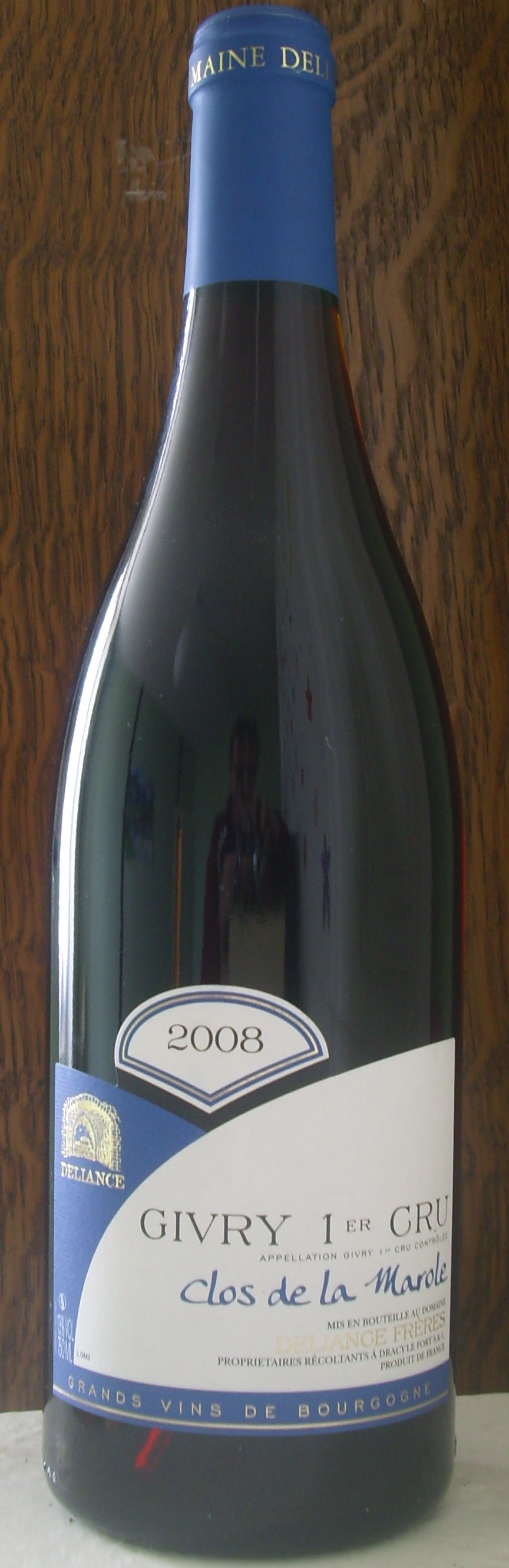
A bottle of Givry Premier Cru
