= Pierre Veltz =

French academic

Pierre Veltz (born 1945) is a French academic.

Veltz holds an engineering degree from École Polytechnique and a PhD in social sciences from École des Hautes Études en Sciences Sociales'. After beginning his career as an urban planner, he went into academic life and consulting. He founded and headed LATTS, an interdisciplinary research group, at the crossroads of technical and sociological research. From 1981 to 1991, he was the Dean of Research at the Ecole Nationale des Ponts et Chaussées, one of the leading French Grandes écoles. From 1999 to 2004, he was the Director of this School. He also chaired ParisTech, which is a group of ten foremost engineering schools in Paris.

At present, he is Professor at the Ecole des Ponts and Associate Professor at Sciences Po Paris (Centre de sociologie des organisations). He is also the director of IHEDATE (Institut des Hautes Etudes pour le Développement et l’Aménagement des Territoires en Europe). His fields of research are: urban development and planning, economic geography, management and the transformations of organizational structures.

== Published works ==
- Des territoires pour apprendre et innover, Editions de l'Aube / Editions Charles Léopold Mayer, 1994, (ISBN 2876781719)
- Mondialisation, villes et territoires : une économie d'archipel, PUF, 1996 (nouvelle édition en poche, réactualisée, à paraître en avril 2005)
- Le nouveau monde industriel, Gallimard, avril 2000
- Des lieux et des liens. Politique du territoire à l'heure de la mondialisation, Ed. de l'Aube, 2002
- Le grand tournant : Nord-Pas-de-Calais 1975-2005, avec L. Davezies, Ed. de L’Aube, 2005
- Faut-il sauver les grandes écoles ?, Presses de Sciences Po, 2007
- La grande transition , Seuil, 2008 (La France dans le monde qui vient)
