= Dianna Xu =

Mathematician and computer scientist

Yilun Dianna Xu is a mathematician and computer scientist whose research concerns the computational geometry of curves and surfaces, computer vision, and computer graphics. She is a professor of computer science at Bryn Mawr College where she chairs the computer science department.

== Education and career ==
Xu graduated from Smith College in 1996, with a bachelor's degree in computer science. She credits going to a women's college with the nurturing environment that allowed her to become interested in computer science.

She completed her Ph.D. in 2002 in computer and information science at the University of Pennsylvania. Her dissertation, Incremental Algorithms for the Design of Triangular-Based Spline Surfaces, was supervised by Jean Gallier. After staying at Pennsylvania as a postdoctoral researcher, she joined the Bryn Mawr faculty in 2004.

== Books ==
With Ira Greenberg and Deepak Kumar, Xu is the author of Processing: Creative Coding and Generative Art in Processing 2 (Springer, 2013), a tutorial introduction to Processing, an open-source graphical library and integrated development environment built for the electronic arts, new media art, and visual design communities. With Jean Gallier, she is the author of A Guide to the Classification Theorem for Compact Surfaces (Springer, 2013).
