= Jean-Marie Morel =

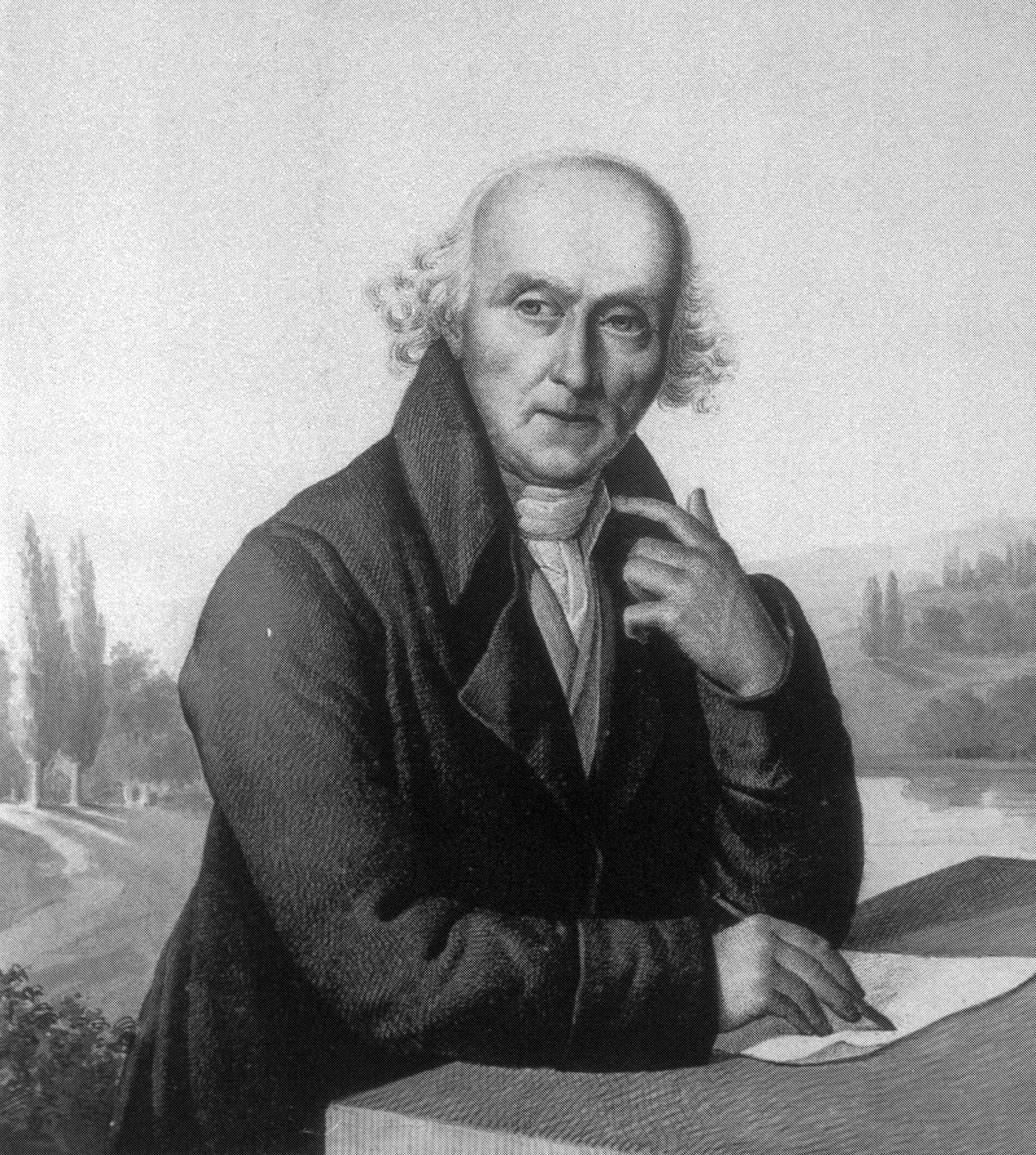
Jean Marie Morel

Jean-Marie Morel (28 March 1728 – 10 August 1810), the author of La Théorie des Jardins (Paris 1776), was a trained architect and surveyor, who produced a substantial and popular work advocating the "natural" landscape style of gardening in France, a French landscape garden. Morel never visited England to see the English garden style, but his book profited from the published theories of Thomas Whately and Claude-Henri Watelet and from the experience he had gained from his close association with the marquis de Girardin at Ermenonville. Girondin's own De la Composition des paysages appeared in 1777.

== History ==
Morel was chief architect to the Princes of Conti from as early as 1765. John Harris has identified Mme de Boufflers, the mistress and hostess of Louis-François de Bourbon, prince de Conti (1717–76), the friend and support of Rousseau and the first woman of fashion to open her salon to foreigners, as the first French gardener in a landscape style that genuinely could be called "Brownian", that is, reflective of the style of Lancelot "Capability" Brown. On her return from England in 1765, she immediately grassed over her gardens, both at the Hôtel Saint-Simon in the Temple, Paris and then at the house at Auteuil, which she acquired in 1773. The results— "begotten by her on an English gardener" Horace Walpole remarked— which were a revelation to all Paris, must have been deeply impressive to the Conti architect, Morel.

== Ermenonville ==
Morel was the architect in charge at Ermenonville from the mid-1760s. He enjoyed a long career that was focused almost entirely on garden design. He worked on some four dozen parks and gardens, including Guiscard, Arcelot, Couternon, Ermenonville, Casson, Launay and La Malmaison. His popular treatise offers extensive descriptions of Guiscard and Ermenonville, as illustrative examples. Where we have documentation, as at Ermenonville, it appears that Morel claims more credit for its design than is due. Of all French gardeners of the picturesque school, he stood furthest from the fashionable and decorative Anglo-chinois aspects of garden design, with its crowded and petty effects, and advocated a broader, plainer style, both morally meaningful and more directly imitative of nature. Morel coined the French term for the landscape professional, architecte-paysagiste, as early as 1804; his ideas were far more influential on the later landscape style of the early nineteenth century than on his immediate contemporaries.

== See also ==
- French landscape garden
- Landscape gardens index
- Landscape design history
