= École nationale des ponts et chaussées =

French institution of higher education and research

Coordinates: 48°50′28″N 2°35′16″E

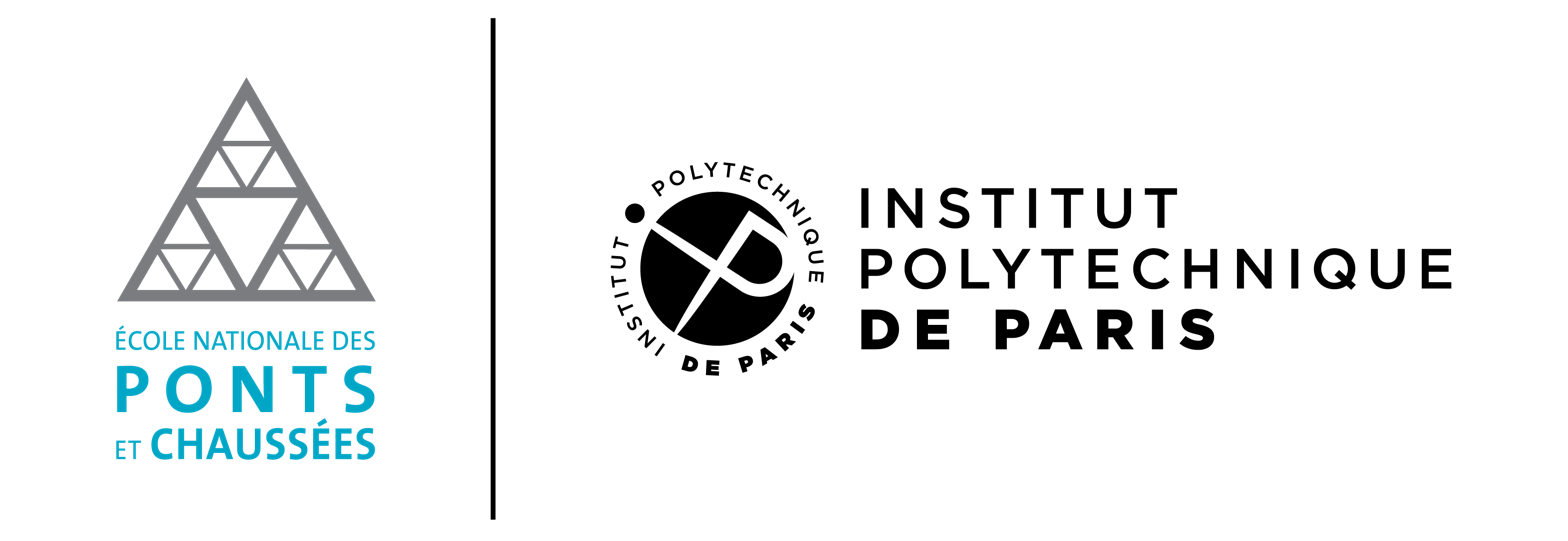
- Other name: Ponts
- Motto: Building the worlds of tomorrow
- Type: French grande école, member of Institut Polytechnique de Paris
- Established: 1747; 279 years ago
- Founder: Daniel-Charles Trudaine
- Parent institution: Institut Polytechnique de Paris
- Academic affiliations: Conférence des Grandes écoles Institut Polytechnique de Paris; European Engineering Learning Innovation Science Alliance (EELISA)
- Director: Anthony Briant
- Students: 1,971
- Location: Champs-sur-Marne, France
- Website: ecoledesponts.fr/en

École nationale des ponts et chaussées (French pronunciation: [ekɔl nɑsjɔnal de pɔ̃ e ʃose]; transl. "National School of Bridges and Roads"; abbr. ENPC), also nicknamed Ponts ([pɔ̃]), formerly known temporarily as École des Ponts ParisTech ([ekɔl de pɔ̃ paʁitɛk]), is a grande école in the field of science, engineering and technology, of the Polytechnic Institute of Paris, a public research university. Founded in 1747 by Daniel-Charles Trudaine, it is one of the oldest and one of the most prestigious French Grandes Écoles.

Historically, its primary mission has been to train engineering officials and civil engineers but the school now offers a wide-ranging education including computer science, applied mathematics, civil engineering, mechanics, finance, economics, innovation, urban studies, environment and transport engineering. École des Ponts is today largely international: 43% of its students obtain a double degree abroad, and 30% of an ingénieur cohort is foreign.

It is headquartered in Marne-la-Vallée (suburb of Paris), France, and was a founding member of ParisTech (Paris Institute of Technology) and of the Paris School of Economics. The school is under the Ministry of Ecology, Sustainable Development and Energy of France. Since 16 July 2024, the school has been a constituent member of the Polytechnic Institute of Paris.

== History ==
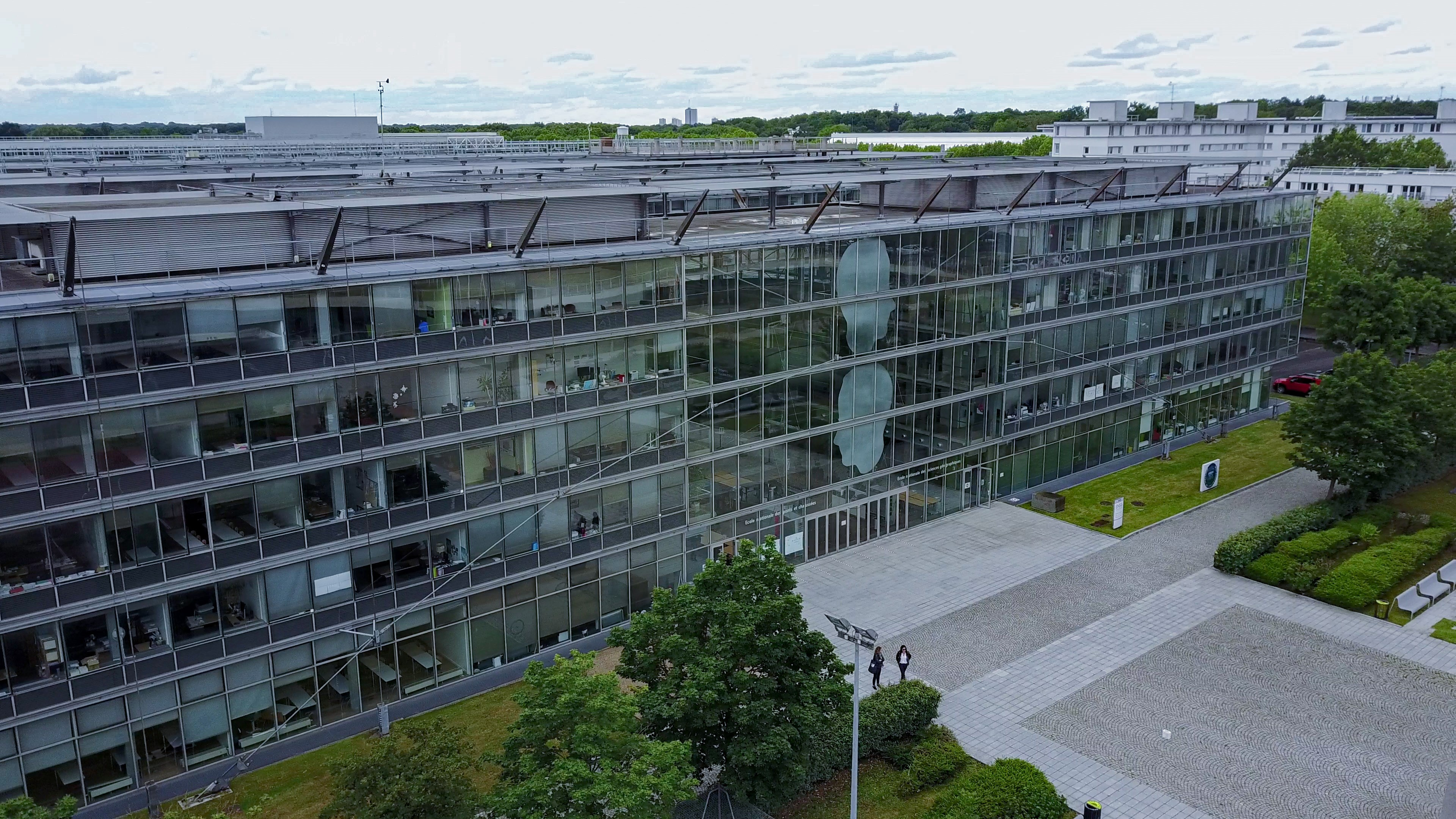
The Carnot Building.

=== 1747–1794: Origins ===
Following the creation of the Corps of Bridges and Roads in 1716, the King's Council decided in 1747 to found a specific training course for the state's engineers, as École royale des ponts et chaussées. In 1775, the school took its current name as École nationale des ponts et chaussées, by Daniel-Charles Trudaine, in a moment when the state decided to set up a progressive and efficient control of the building of roads, bridges and canals, and in the training of civil engineers.

The school's first director, from 1747 until 1794, was Jean-Rodolphe Perronet, engineer, civil service administrator and a contributor to the Encyclopédie of Denis Diderot and Jean le Rond d'Alembert. Without lecturer, fifty students (among whom Lebon, Bernardin de Saint-Pierre, Pierre-Simon Girard, Riche de Prony, Méchain and Brémontier), initially taught themselves geometry, algebra, mechanics and hydraulics. Visits of building sites, cooperations with scientists and engineers and participation to the drawing of the map of the kingdom used to complete their training, which was usually four to twelve years long.

=== 1794–1848: Growth and industrialisation ===
During the First French Empire run by Napoleon I from 1804 to 1814, a number of members of the Corps of Bridges and Roads (including Barré de Saint-Venant, Belgrand, Biot, Cauchy, Coriolis, Dupuit, Fresnel, Gay-Lussac, Navier, Vicat) took part in the reconstruction of the French road network that had not been maintained during the Revolution, and in large infrastructural developments, notably hydraulic projects. Under the orders of the emperor, French scientist Gaspard Riche de Prony, second director of the school from 1798 to 1839, adapts the education provided by the school in order to improve the training of future civil engineers, whose purpose is to rebuild the major infrastructures of the country: roads, bridges, but also administrative buildings, barracks and fortifications. Prony is now considered as a historical and influential figure of the school. During the twenty years that followed the First Empire, the experience of the faculty and the alumni involved in the reconstruction strongly influenced its training methods and internal organisation. In 1831, the school opens its first laboratory, which aims at concentrating the talents and experiences of the country's best civil engineers. The school also gradually becomes a place of reflection and debates for urban planning.

=== 1848–1945: The big works ===
As a new step in the evolution of the school, the decree of 1851 insists on the organisation of the courses, the writing of an annual schedule, the quality of the faculty, and the control of the students' works. For the first time in its history, the school opens its doors to a larger public. At this time, in France, the remarkable development of transports, roads, bridges and canals is strongly influenced by engineers from the school (Becquerel, Bienvenüe, Caquot, Carnot, Colson, Coyne, Freyssinet, Résal, Séjourné), who deeply modernised the country by creating the large traffic networks, admired in several European countries.

=== 1945–1997: Modernisation ===
Marie-France Clugnet, the first female student, at a ball hosted by the school in 1961.

After the Second World War, the school focused on developing the link between economics and engineering. As civil engineering was requiring increasingly higher financial investments, the state needed engineers to be able to understand the economic situation of post-war Europe. From then on, the program of the school had three different aspects: scientific and technic, social, and economic. Gradually, the number of admitted students increased in order to provide both the Corps of Bridges and Roads and the private sector highly trained young engineers. At the time, technical progress and considerable development of sciences and techniques used in building, urbanism and the protection of the environment imposed a change of strategy in the training programme. More specialisations were progressively created and the overall programme was adapted to national issues.

== Academics ==
École des Ponts is a Grande école, a French institution of higher education that is separate from, but parallel and connected to the main framework of the French public university system. Similar to the Ivy League in the United States, Oxbridge in the UK, and C9 League in China, Grandes Écoles are elite academic institutions that admit students through an extremely competitive process. Alums go on to occupy elite positions within government, administration, and corporate firms in France.

Although they are more expensive than public universities in France, Grandes Écoles typically have much smaller class sizes and student bodies, and many of their programs are taught in English. International internships, study abroad opportunities, and close ties with government and the corporate world are a hallmark of the Grandes Écoles. Many of the top ranked institutes and business schools in Europe are members of the Conférence des Grandes Écoles (CGE), as is École des Ponts; out of the 250 business schools in France, only 39 are CGE members.

École des Ponts offers high-level programmes in an extensive range of fields, with traditional competences in mathematics, computer science, civil engineering, mechanics, economics, finance, environment, transport, town & regional planning, logistics and innovation. It is among the schools called "généralistes", which means that students receive a broad, management-oriented and non-specialised education. The school also offers specialized/research masters and PhDs, and a design school, with programmes in innovation and startup creation. Degrees from École des Ponts are accredited by the Conférence des Grandes Écoles and awarded by the Ministry of National Education (France) (French: Le Ministère de L'éducation Nationale). Its Business School is further accredited by the elite international business school accrediting organizations and it holds double accreditation: The Association to Advance Collegiate Schools of Business (AACSB), and Association of MBAs (AMBA)

=== Ranking ===
National ranking (ranked for its Master of Sciences in Engineering)

Name	Year	Rank
DAUR Rankings	2022	3

Times Higher Education ranked these Grandes Écoles in the top 10 worldwide (small universities: fewer than 5,000 students):

Times Higher Education – top 10 small universities worldwide	2019	2021
École des Ponts ParisTech	9th	7th

=== The Ingénieur programme ===
==== Curriculum ====
This undergraduate-graduate engineering programme is the original and main programme offered by the school. It is quite different from typical university or college studies and specific to the French system of Grandes Écoles. The Ingénieur degree of École des Ponts – the Diplôme d'Ingénieur – is equivalent to a Master of Science (including a Bachelor of Science).

==== Admissions ====
Admissions for engineering students is mostly done after scientific preparatory classes (MP, PSI, PC) through the highly selective "Mines-Ponts" competitive entrance exams. Some places are open each year to French and foreign university students as well as BCPST (biology) scientific preparatory classes

École des Ponts recruits among the top 4% of the students in preparatory classes.

=== Master's degrees ===
École des Ponts offers a wide range of master's degrees, drawing on its historical domains of expertise. Some of them are in partnership with other high-profile institutions.

Applied Mathematics option

- Mathematics for finance and data (MFD)
- Mathematics, Vision, Learning (MVA)
- Modelling, Analysis, Simulation (MAS)
- Operational Research (RO)
- Probabilities and Random Models (PMA)

Energy option

- Energy Transition At Local Scale (TET)

Mechanics option – co-accreditation with Sorbonne University

- Multiscale Approaches for Materials and Structures (AMMS)
- Durability of Materials and Structures (DMS)

Civil Engineering option – co-accreditation with UGE

- Mechanics of Soils, Rocks, and Structures in their Environment (MSROE)

Materials Science and Engineering option – co-accreditation with UGE

- Materials Science for Sustainable Construction (SMCD)

Transportation, Mobility, Networks option – co-accreditation with IP Paris, PSL, École d'Urbanisme de Paris (UGE & UPEC)

- Transportation, Mobility (TM)
- Transportation and Sustainable Development (TraDD)

Nuclear Engineering

- Decommissioning and Waste Management

Environmental, Energy, and Transportation Economics option – co-accreditation with Université Paris Saclay, Université Paris Nanterre and IFP School

- Environmental Economics
- Economics of Energy
- Prospective Modeling
- Transport and Mobility Economics

Analysis and political Economypolicy option – co-accreditation with Université Paris 1, PSL et EHESS

- Analysis and Political Economy (APE)

Applied Economics option – co-accreditation with PSL et EHESS

- Public Policies and Development (PPD)

Master of Science - with Paris School of Economics

- MSc – Master of Science Sustainable Impact of Analysis (SIA)

=== Executive masters programmes ===
The School delivers 14 Executive Masters ("Mastère Spécialisé"):

- Sustainable Real Estate and Building, Energy and Digital Transitions (IBD)
- BIM, Integrated Design and Life Cycles of Buildings and Infrastructures (BIM)
- Spatial Planning and Urban Development
- Digital Twins for Infrastructures and Cities
- Civil Engineering and Ecodesign (GCE)
- Engineering of Large Energy Structures (GCGOE)
- Railway and Urban Transport System Engineering
- Smart Mobility
- Critical Materials
- Infrastructure Project Finance (IPF)
- Supply Chain Design and Management
- Management of Energy Projects
- Public Policies and Actions for Sustainable Development (PAPDD)
- Advanced Public Action Morocco

=== PhDs ===
The laboratories of the school host many PhD students (and classical CIFRE theses) wishing to engage in research, the financing of which is done mainly through corporate chairs. Ecole nationale des ponts et chaussées was welcoming, in 2023–2024, 673 PhD students and postdoctoral fellows in its 12 laboratories. The Ingénieur programme students have the opportunity to complete their training with a PhD in the school's laboratories, or to prepare for it by pursuing a research Masters in these laboratories during their third year.

=== École des Ponts Business School ===
École des Ponts Business School is the graduate business school of École des Ponts, one of France's oldest and most prestigious Grandes Écoles, founded by royal decree of Louis XV in 1747.

The business school was founded in 1987 by Célia Russo as the ENPC School of International Management, later renamed École des Ponts Business School. At the time, embedding an English-language, internationally taught MBA programme within a traditional French engineering grande école was unconventional and met resistance, as it broke with the dominant model of French management education. It became the first MBA-granting programme of its kind at a French engineering grande école.

It offers several executive programmes:

- LeadTech Global Executive MBA — a dual-degree programme with EADA Business School
- Executive DBA
- VISTA:Beauvais — Master in Entrepreneurship & Tech for Good
- Government Acceleration Specialized E-MBA
- A Global Executive MBA in Morocco (Casablanca) and a specialized DBA in China
- A range of corporate and individual executive trainings (in-person, online, and abroad)

=== D.School Paris at École nationale des ponts et chaussées ===
As part of the Ministry of Education and Research IDEFI (Excellence Initiatives for Innovative Training) programme, the school has created the first French design school.

d.School Paris offers courses, notably through the ME310 programme in partnership with Stanford University, with a strong entrepreneurial dimension.

=== Corps of Bridges, Waters and Forests ===
The Corps of Bridges, Waters and Forests is a technical Grand Corps of the French State (see Grands corps de l'Etat). People entering the Corps become officials and serve the French state.

=== Departments ===
Education for the Ingénieur programme is organised in the six following departments:

- Civil and Structural Engineering
- City, Environment, Transportation
- Mechanical Engineering and Materials Science
- Applied Mathematics and Computer Science
- Economics, Management, Finance
- Industrial Engineering

== Partnerships ==
=== Partnerships with French institutions ===
French academic partners

- Paris School of Economics
- PSL Research Institute
- École des ingénieurs de la Ville de Paris (EIVP)
- Écoles de formation du MEDDE
- Conférence des Grandes Écoles

French double-degree agreements

The school also allows students to pursue a double-degree in France with the following institutions:

- École d'Architecture Marne-la-Vallée
- École nationale de l'aviation civile
- ENS Paris-Saclay
- HEC Paris
- Sciences Po Paris
- Paris School of Economics
- Collège des Ingénieurs
- IFP School
- École des ingénieurs de la Ville de Paris

=== Partnerships with international institutions ===
Over the years, École nationale des ponts et chaussées has developed institutional relationships with partners around the world and has signed cooperation agreements with other academic institutions. Among the choices available to students, it is possible to pursue a double-degree at a partner institution (45 dual-degree agreements in 2023-2024). It is also possible to pursue exchange semesters within the framework of bilateral agreements (Berkeley, Georgia Tech, Imperial College or Erasmus exchanges), or research internships in the laboratories of the school's academic partners. In particular, the school has very close ties with Brazil, China and Spain. In the second year of the Ingénieur programme, a third of the cohort comes from partner institutions.

Every year, many students get a double-degree in an establishment approved by the school, including leading universities in the United-States (Stanford, MIT, Berkeley, Princeton, Columbia), the United-Kingdom (London School of Economics, Imperial College, Oxford, Cambridge) and Asia (Tokyo University, NUS, HKU).

=== One-way double-degree agreements ===
Apart from exchange agreements with world high-level universities, École des Ponts offers every year to selected students from some universities of France's partner countries to pursue their studies and earn the École des Ponts degree besides their original university's degree. Universities with this form of partnership include the National Engineering School of Tunis from Tunisia, the École Hassania des travaux publics from Morocco and the Université Saint-Joseph de Beyrouth from Lebanon.

== Research ==
École nationale des ponts et chaussées runs research in the following disciplines (the names of corresponding research centres are in brackets):

- Atmospheric environment (CEREA)
- Water, urban planning and environment (LEESU)
- Mathematics and scientific computing (CERMICS)
- Computer science (LIGM / IMAGINE)
- International environment and development (CIRED)
- Hydrology Meteorology and Complexity (HM&Co)
- Social sciences and spatial planning (LATTS)
- Regional planning and social sciences (LATTS)
- Dynamic meteorology (LMD)
- Fluid mechanics (LHSV)
- Urban planning and transport (LVMT)
- Economics (Paris-Jourdan Economics Laboratory)
- Mechanics and physics of materials and structures (Navier)

École nationale des ponts et chaussées was also the lead developer of Scilab along with INRIA. Scilab is now developed by the Scilab Consortium.

== Alumni and faculty ==
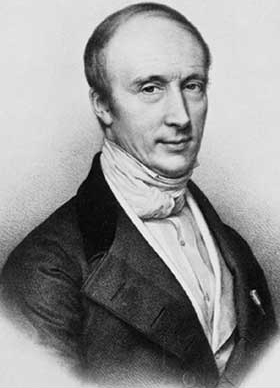
Augustin Louis Cauchy

Alumni include (by alphabetical order, French unless indicated):

- Mohamed Abdeljalil, Moroccan Minister of Transport & Logistics
- Paul Andreu, architect
- Guy Béart, singer and songwriter
- Henri Becquerel, physicist
- Eugène Belgrand, engineer
- Fulgence Bienvenüe, chief engineer for the Paris Métro
- André Blondel, engineer and physicist
- Élisabeth Borne, French Prime Minister from 2022 to 2024
- Laurent-Emmanuel Calvet, economist
- Albert Caquot, civil engineer, considered the "best living French engineer" during half a century
- Marie François Sadi Carnot, French president from 1887 to 1894
- Jules Carvallo, civil engineer
- Augustin Louis Cauchy, mathematician
- Louis-Alexandre de Cessart, civil engineer
- Antoine de Chézy, hydrologist and civil engineer
- Gaspard-Gustave Coriolis, mathematician and physicist
- Jules Dupuit, civil engineer and economist
- Charles Ellet, Jr., American civil engineer
- Augustin-Jean Fresnel, physicist
- Eugène Freyssinet, structural and civil engineer, pioneer of prestressed concrete
- Jean Gallier, computer scientist
- Émiland Gauthey, civil engineer, designer of bridges, canals and roads, uncle of Claude-Louis Navier
- Joseph Louis Gay-Lussac, chemist and physicist
- Hoàng Xuân Hãn, Vietnamese scholar, professor of mathematics, linguist, historian and educationalist
- Fouad Laroui, Moroccan economist and writer
- Alain Lipietz, economist and politician
- Charles Joseph Minard, civil engineer and pioneer of information graphics
- Nguyen Ngoc Bich, Francophile anticolonialist
- Claude-Louis Navier, engineer and physicist, known for Navier-Stokes equations
- Jean-Rodolphe Perronet, architect and structural engineer
- Antoine Picon, Professor of History of Architecture and Technology and co-director of doctoral programs (PhD & DDes) at Harvard Graduate School of Design
- Ambroise Roux, CEO of Compagnie générale d'électricité (later known as Alcatel) from 1970 to 1981
- Prince Souphanouvong, president of Laos from 1975 to 1991
- Jean Tirole, economist, Nobel prize in Economic Sciences in 2014
- Daniel-Charles Trudaine, administrator and civil engineer
- Pierre Veltz, academic and École des Ponts ParisTech's former director
- Louis Vicat, engineer, inventor of artificial cement
- Raul Salinas de Gortari, civil engineer, politician and businessman
- Juan Carlos García Pérez de Arce, architect, Minister of Public Works in Chile

Past and present faculty include:

- Étienne-Louis Boullée, architect
- Alexander Spiers, English lexicographer
- Yaarub Bader (يعرب بدر), previous Minister of Transportation in the Syrian Arab Republic
