= A Guide to the Classification Theorem for Compact Surfaces =

Textbook in topology

- First edition
- Author: Jean Gallier, Dianna Xu
- Language: English
- Series: Geometry and Computing
- Genre: Mathematics
- Publisher: Springer-Verlag
- Publication date: 2013
- ISBN: 978-3-642-34363-6

A Guide to the Classification Theorem for Compact Surfaces is a textbook in topology, on the classification of two-dimensional surfaces. It was written by Jean Gallier and Dianna Xu, and published in 2013 by Springer-Verlag as volume 9 of their Geometry and Computing series (doi:10.1007/978-3-642-34364-3, ISBN 978-3-642-34363-6). The Basic Library List Committee of the Mathematical Association of America has recommended its inclusion in undergraduate mathematics libraries.

== Topics ==
The classification of surfaces (more formally, compact two-dimensional manifolds without boundary) can be stated very simply, as it depends only on the Euler characteristic and orientability of the surface. An orientable surface of this type must be topologically equivalent (homeomorphic) to a sphere, torus, or more general handlebody, classified by its number of handles. A non-orientable surface must be equivalent to a projective plane, Klein bottle, or more general surface characterized by an analogous number, its number of cross-caps. For compact surfaces with boundary, the only extra information needed is the number of boundary components. This result is presented informally at the start of the book, as the first of its six chapters. The rest of the book presents a more rigorous formulation of the problem, a presentation of the topological tools needed to prove the result, and a formal proof of the classification.

Other topics in topology discussed as part of this presentation include simplicial complexes, fundamental groups, simplicial homology and singular homology, and the Poincaré conjecture. Appendices include additional material on embeddings and self-intersecting mappings of surfaces into three-dimensional space such as the Roman surface, the structure of finitely generated abelian groups, general topology, the history of the classification theorem, and the Hauptvermutung (the theorem that every surface can be triangulated).

== Audience and reception ==
This is a textbook aimed at the level of advanced undergraduates or beginning graduate students in mathematics, perhaps after having already completed a first course in topology. Readers of the book are expected to already be familiar with general topology, linear algebra, and group theory. However, as a textbook, it lacks exercises, and reviewer Bill Wood suggests its use for a student project rather than for a formal course.

Many other graduate algebraic topology textbooks include coverage of the same topic. However, by focusing on a single topic, the classification theorem, the book is able to prove the result rigorously while remaining at a lower overall level, provide a greater amount of intuition and history, and serve as "a motivating tour of the discipline’s fundamental techniques".

Reviewer Clara Löh complains that parts of the book are redundant, and in particular that the classification theorem can be proven either with the fundamental group or with homology (not needing both), that on the other hand several important tools from topology including the Jordan–Schoenflies theorem are not proven, and that several related classification results are omitted. Nevertheless, reviewer D. V. Feldman highly recommends the book, Wood writes "This is a book I wish I’d had in graduate school", and reviewer Werner Kleinert calls it "an introductory text of remarkable didactic value".
