= Nguyễn Ngọc Bích =

Vietnamese resistance against French colonists (1911–1966)

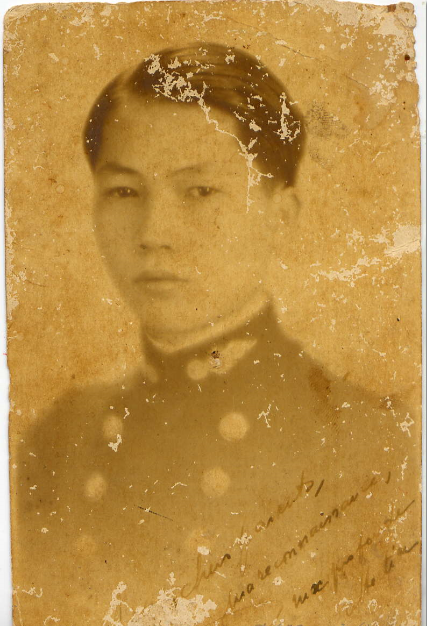
- As a student at École polytechnique, 1931
- Born: 18 May 1911; Bến Tre, Cochinchina
- Died: 4 December 1966 (aged 55)
- Citizenship: South Vietnam
- Education: École polytechnique
- Occupation: Resistance fighter
- Years active: 1935–1966
- Known for: Resistance of French colonialism in Vietnam
- Title: Doctor
- Parents: Nguyễn Ngọc Tương (father); Bui Thi Giau (mother)

Nguyễn Ngọc Bích (1911–1966) was a Vietnamese resistance fighter during the First Indochina War. Bích graduated as an engineer at the Ecole Polytechnique.

== First Indochina War ==
In 1945, Bích joined the Viet Minh as a non-communist nationalist fighter, and led a guerilla force in Ben Tre province. In 1946, Bích was sent to Hanoi by his Viet Minh hierarchy, but was apprehended on his way by French authorities. Bích was then relocated to France and trained in medicine. In 1954, expatriate Vietnamese nationalists considered Bích as a candidate for the future post of Prime Minister of the Republic of Vietnam. However, Bích was rejected as a viable candidate. In 1962, Bích published "Vietnam: An Independent Viewpoint" in The China Quarterly.

== Places named after ==
Nguyen-Ngoc-Bich Street, Cần Thơ, Vietnam.

== Publications ==
- Nguyễn Ngọc Bích (March 1962). "Vietnam—An Independent Viewpoint". The China Quarterly. 9: 105–111.
