= Chagny =

Chagny is the name of the following communes in France:

- Chagny, Ardennes, in the Ardennes department
- Chagny, Saône-et-Loire, in the Saône-et-Loire department
