= Louis Becquey =

French counter-revolutionary

Louis Becquey (24 September 1760 – 2 May 1849) was a French counter-revolutionary. He was born in Vitry-le-François, Champagne, France.

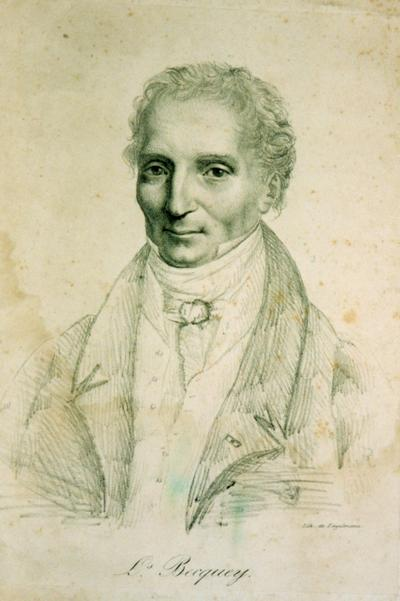
Louis Becquey, was a French counter-revolutionary
