= Estates of Burgundy =

Historical assemblies in the region of Burgundy

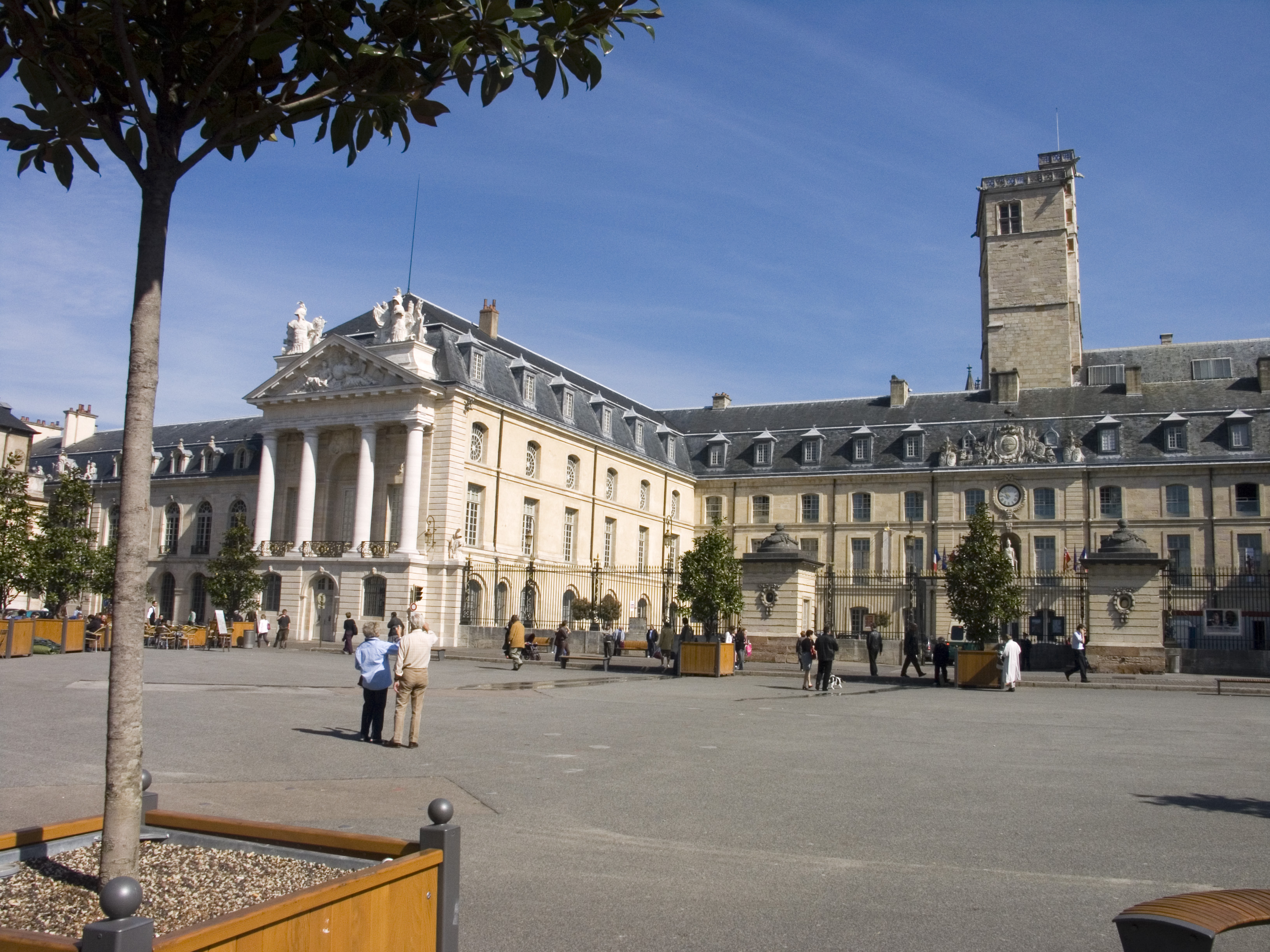
Palace of the Dukes and Estates of Burgundy

In Burgundy, under the Ancien Régime, impôts, aides and subsides as well as the provincial economic administration were, at least in theory, put under a general assembly which occurred every three years - the Estates of Burgundy (often called the Estates General of Burgundy, in contrast to the different États particuliers which were subordinate to it). The Estates' decisions were then executed by the Élus (known as the Élus généraux, in contrast to the Élus of the États particuliers), meeting in the Chambre des élus. The Estates of Burgundy are often described by historians of the estates provincial.
