= Château d'Arcelot =

Arcelot Castle
- Château d'Arcelot
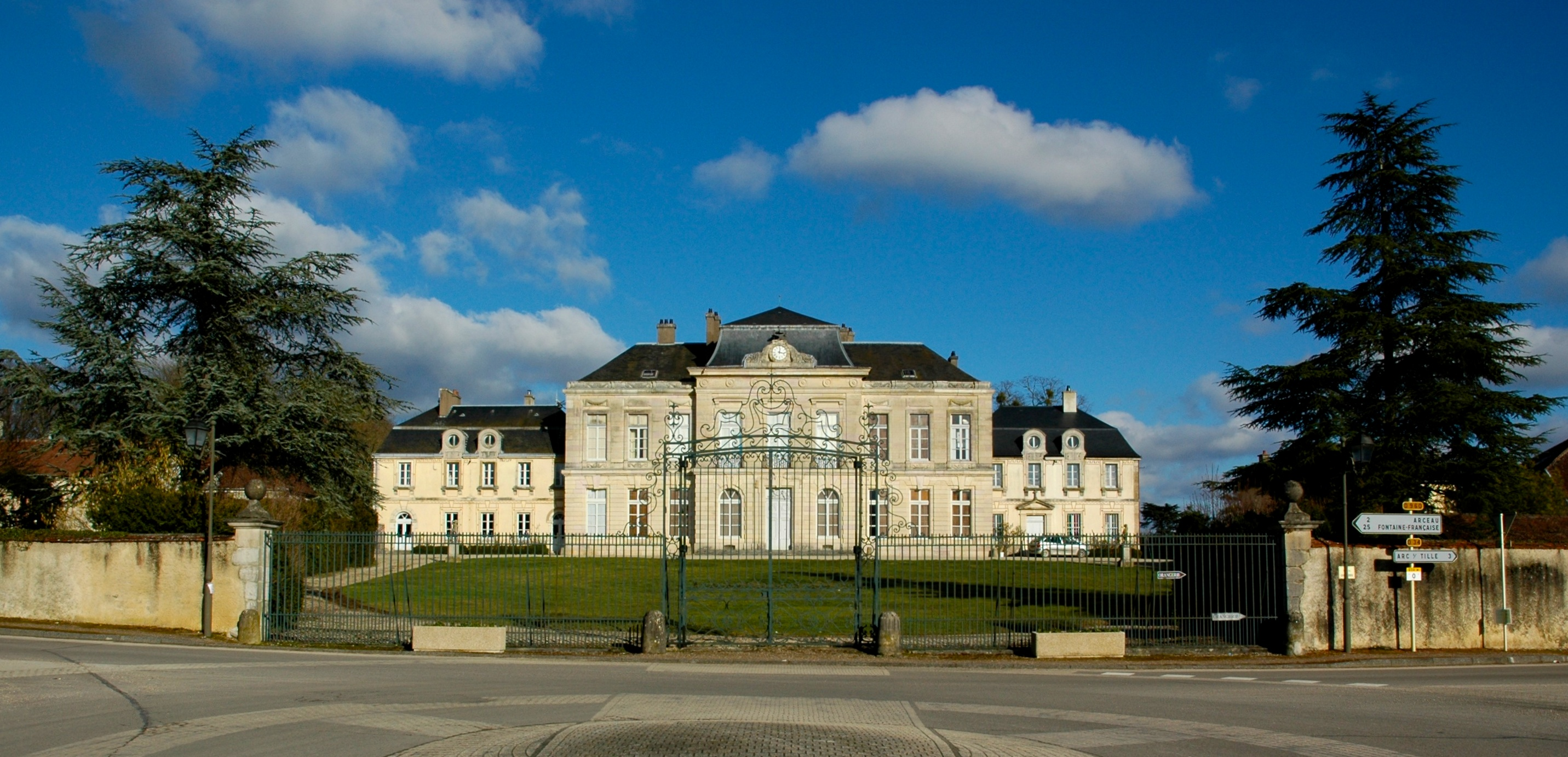

- Location within Burgundy

General information
- Architectural style: neoclassical
- Location: Arceau, Côte-d'Or, France
- Coordinates: 47°22′08″N 05°11′35″E
- Construction started: 1761
- Completed: 1765
- Owner: Loisy family

Technical details
- Grounds: 45 ha (110 acres)

Design and construction
- Architect: Thomas Dumorey
- Awards: Michelin Guide, 1 star

Website
- www.arcelot.fr

References
- Coordinates verified by Géoportail

The Château d'Arcelot is a castle situated around 12 km (7.5 mi) from Dijon in the Arceau commune of Côte-d'Or, France. The building was completed in 1765.

The castle was enlisted as a French Monument Historique on 22 September 1948. On 30 April 1999 its gardens were included in the listing.

== History ==
The castle's origins can be traced back to 1217. The chapel forming part of the current castle is of that date.

The first of the current buildings were the work of Philibert Verchère senior between 1711 and 1720, consisting of two wings. The main house was completed by his grandson, Philibert junior, a servant to the Parlement de Bourgogne. It was built to a design by the architect Thomas Dumorey between 1761 and 1765, and was the first château in Burgundy to be built in the neoclassical style.

The castle remained in the same family until 1870, when the last of the line, Guillaume Verchère, died childless. He bequeathed the castle to his nephew, Ernest de Carrelet de Loisy.

Today, the castle remains in the family of Carrelet de Loisy d'Arcelot.

== Architecture ==
The new building is wedged between two older buildings of 1711 (the former hunting house and chapel); the original plan was to demolish them, but in the end they were retained.

The château's Great Hall (1765) has an unusual coloured stucco style, and is listed with one star in the Michelin Guide, as is its park.

== Park and gardens ==
At the rear of the castle is a 45-hectare (110-acre) park, with a 7-hectare (17-acre) lake, laid out by the landscape gardener Jean-Marie Morel around 1805 (with a folly: a Chinese pavilion). It is one of the few of his designs still in existence.
