= Saint-Symphorien-sur-Saône =

- Commune
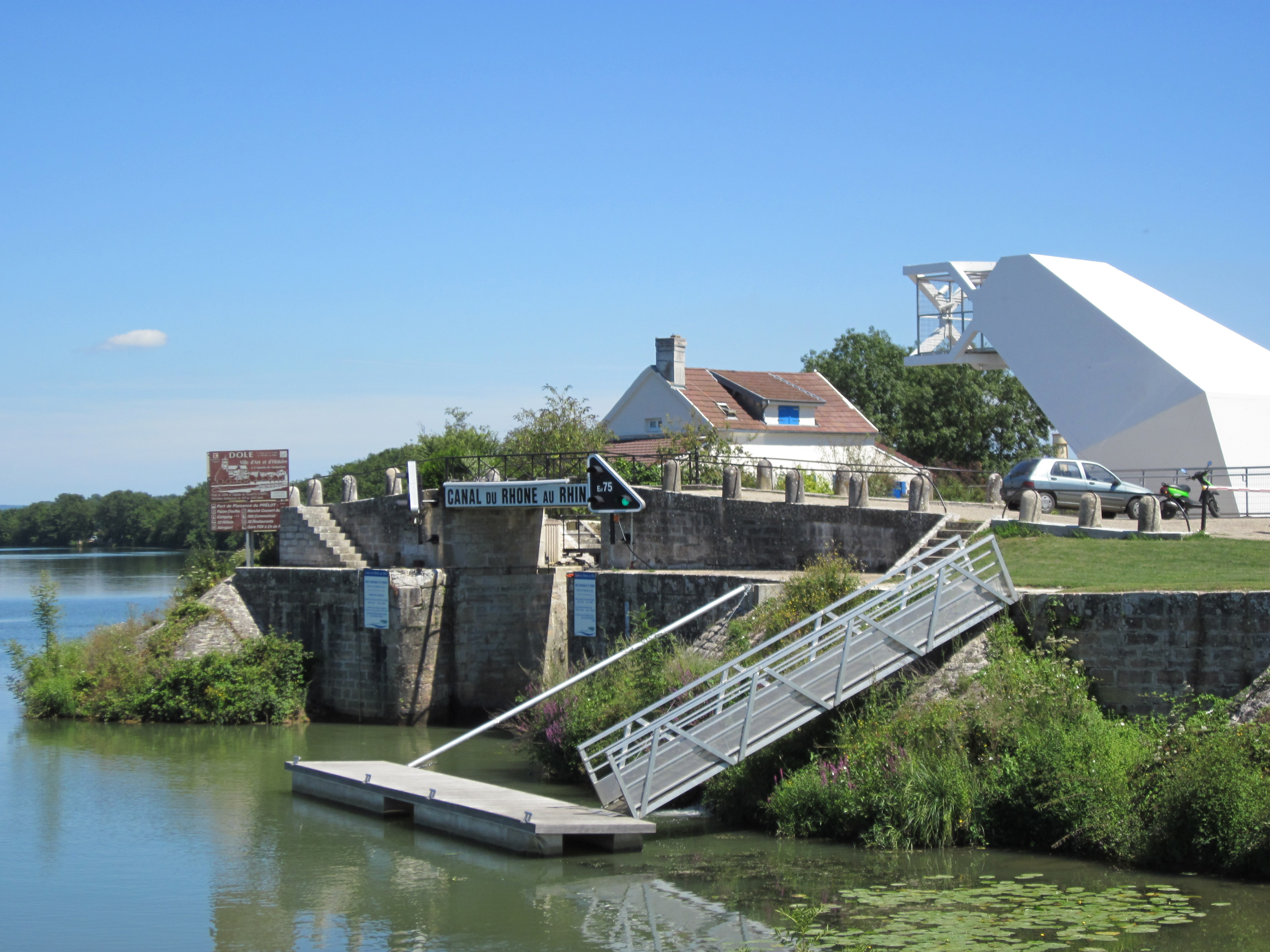
- Rhone–Rhine Canal
- Location of Saint-Symphorien-sur-Saône
- Location within France Location within Bourgogne-Franche-Comté
- Coordinates: 47°06′12″N 5°18′17″E
- Country: France
- Region: Bourgogne-Franche-Comté
- Department: Côte-d'Or
- Arrondissement: Beaune
- Canton: Brazey-en-Plaine
- Intercommunality: Rives de Saône

Government
  - Mayor (2021–2026): Etienne Briot
- Area^{1}: 7.9 km^{2} (3.1 sq mi)
- Elevation: 185 m (607 ft)
- Highest elevation: 191 m (627 ft)
- Lowest elevation: 180 m (590 ft)
- Population (2023): 322
  - Density: 41/km^{2} (110/sq mi)
- Time zone: UTC+01:00 (CET)
  - Summer (DST): UTC+02:00 (CEST)
- INSEE/Postal code: 21575 /21170
- ^{1} French Land Register data, which excludes lakes, ponds, glaciers > 1 km^{2} (0.386 sq mi or 247 acres) and river estuaries.

Saint-Symphorien-sur-Saône (French pronunciation: [sɛ̃ sɛ̃fɔʁjɛ̃ syʁ son], literally Saint-Symphorien on Saône) is a commune in the Côte-d'Or department in eastern France.

== Population ==
Historical population
Year	Pop.	±% p.a.
1968	231	—
1975	220	−0.69%
1982	252	+1.96%
1990	302	+2.29%
1999	306	+0.15%
2007	340	+1.33%
2012	369	+1.65%
2017	350	−1.05%
2023	322	−1.38%
Source: INSEE

== See also ==
- Communes of the Côte-d'Or department
