= Dracy-le-Fort =

- Commune
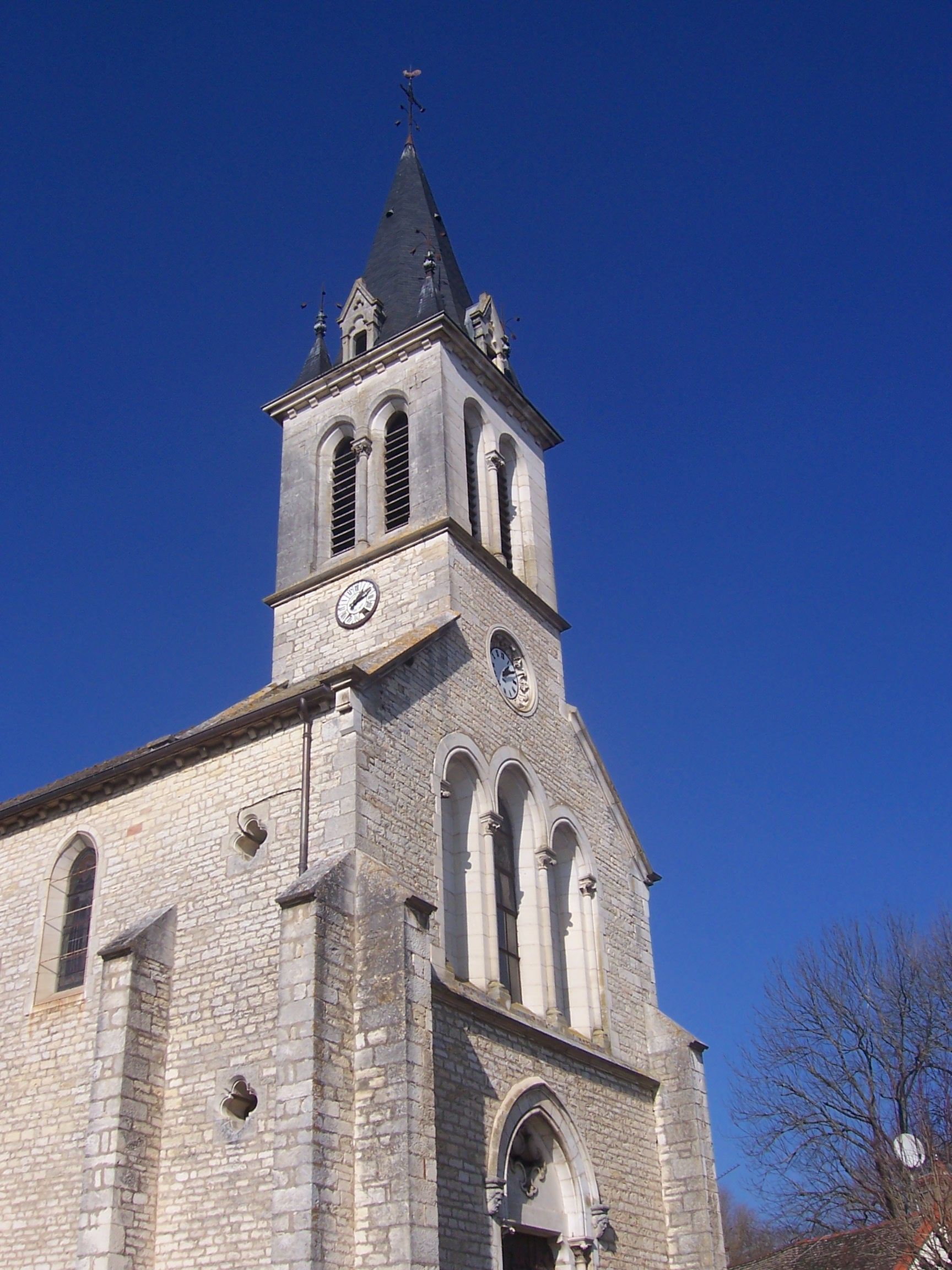
- The church in Dracy-le-Fort

- Coat of arms
- Location of Dracy-le-Fort
- Location within France Location within Bourgogne-Franche-Comté
- Coordinates: 46°47′57″N 4°45′39″E
- Country: France
- Region: Bourgogne-Franche-Comté
- Department: Saône-et-Loire
- Arrondissement: Chalon-sur-Saône
- Canton: Givry
- Intercommunality: CA Le Grand Chalon

Government
  - Mayor (2020–2026): Olivier Grosjean
- Area^{1}: 6.36 km^{2} (2.46 sq mi)
- Elevation: 180 m (590 ft)
- Highest elevation: 280 m (920 ft)
- Lowest elevation: 186 m (610 ft)
- Population (2023): 1,472
  - Density: 231/km^{2} (599/sq mi)
- Time zone: UTC+01:00 (CET)
  - Summer (DST): UTC+02:00 (CEST)
- INSEE/Postal code: 71182 /71640
- ^{1} French Land Register data, which excludes lakes, ponds, glaciers > 1 km^{2} (0.386 sq mi or 247 acres) and river estuaries.

Dracy-le-Fort (French pronunciation: [dʁasi lə fɔʁ]) is a commune in the Saône-et-Loire department in the region of Bourgogne-Franche-Comté in eastern France.

== Gallery ==
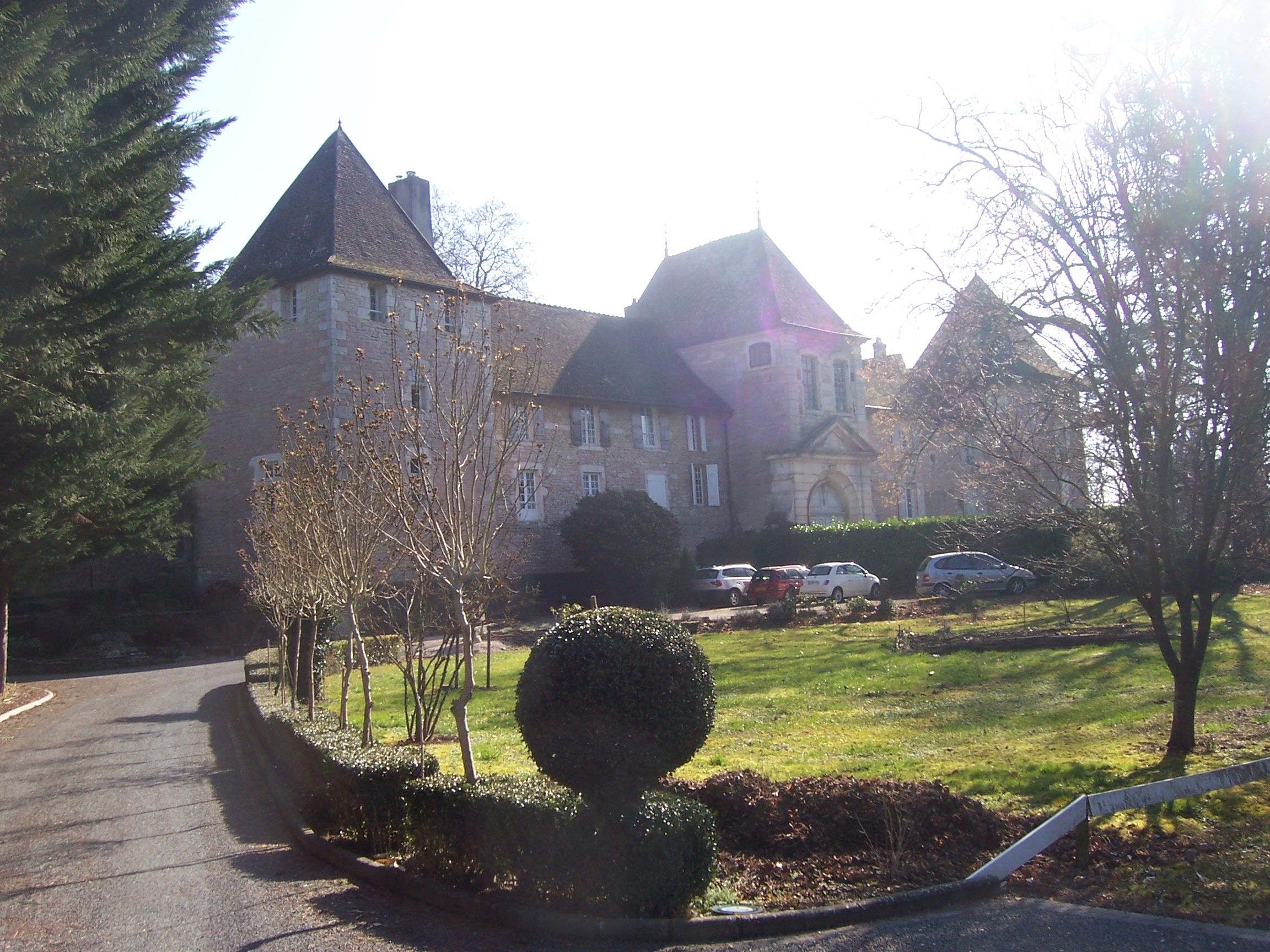
Chateau

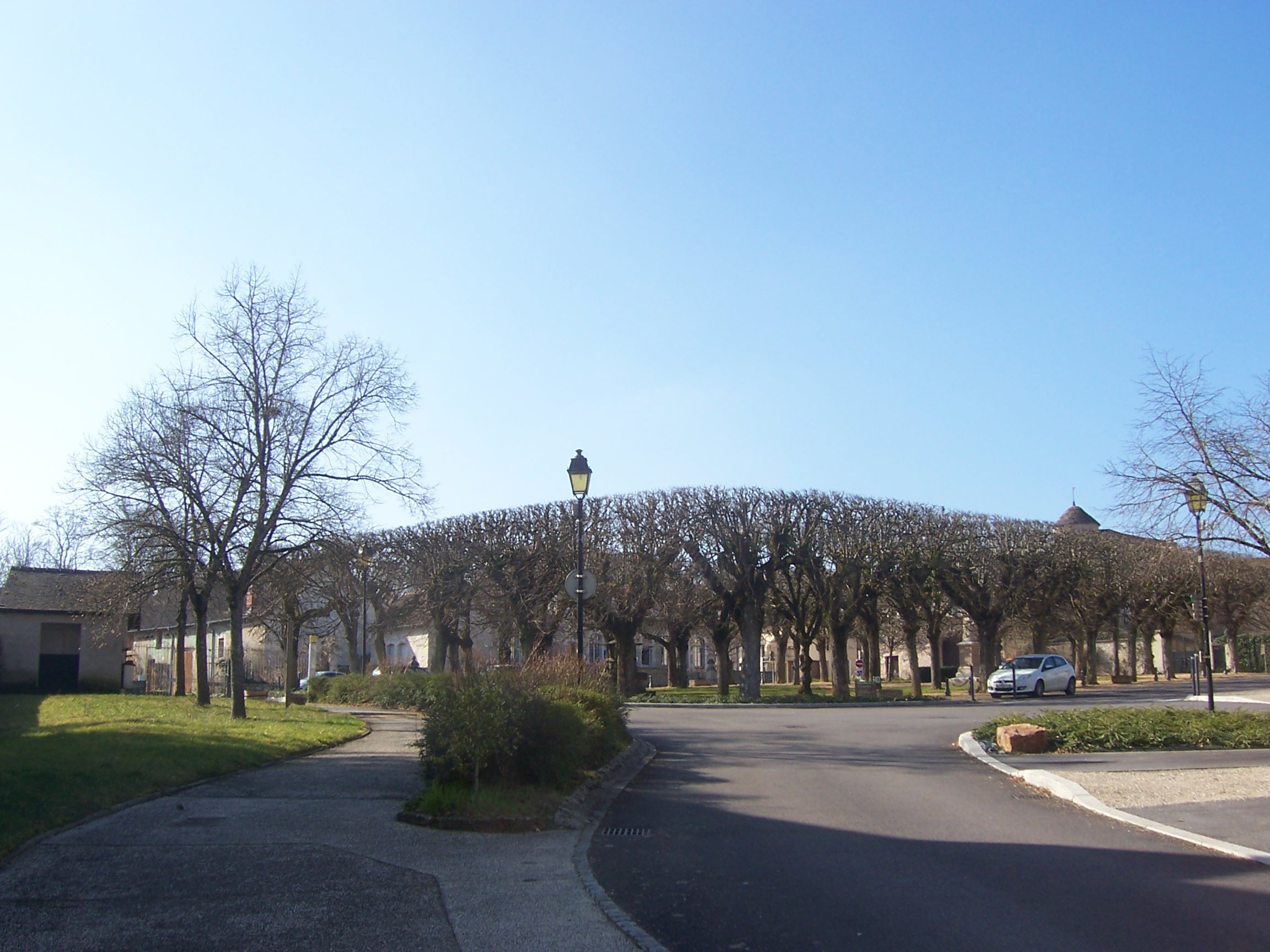
Square

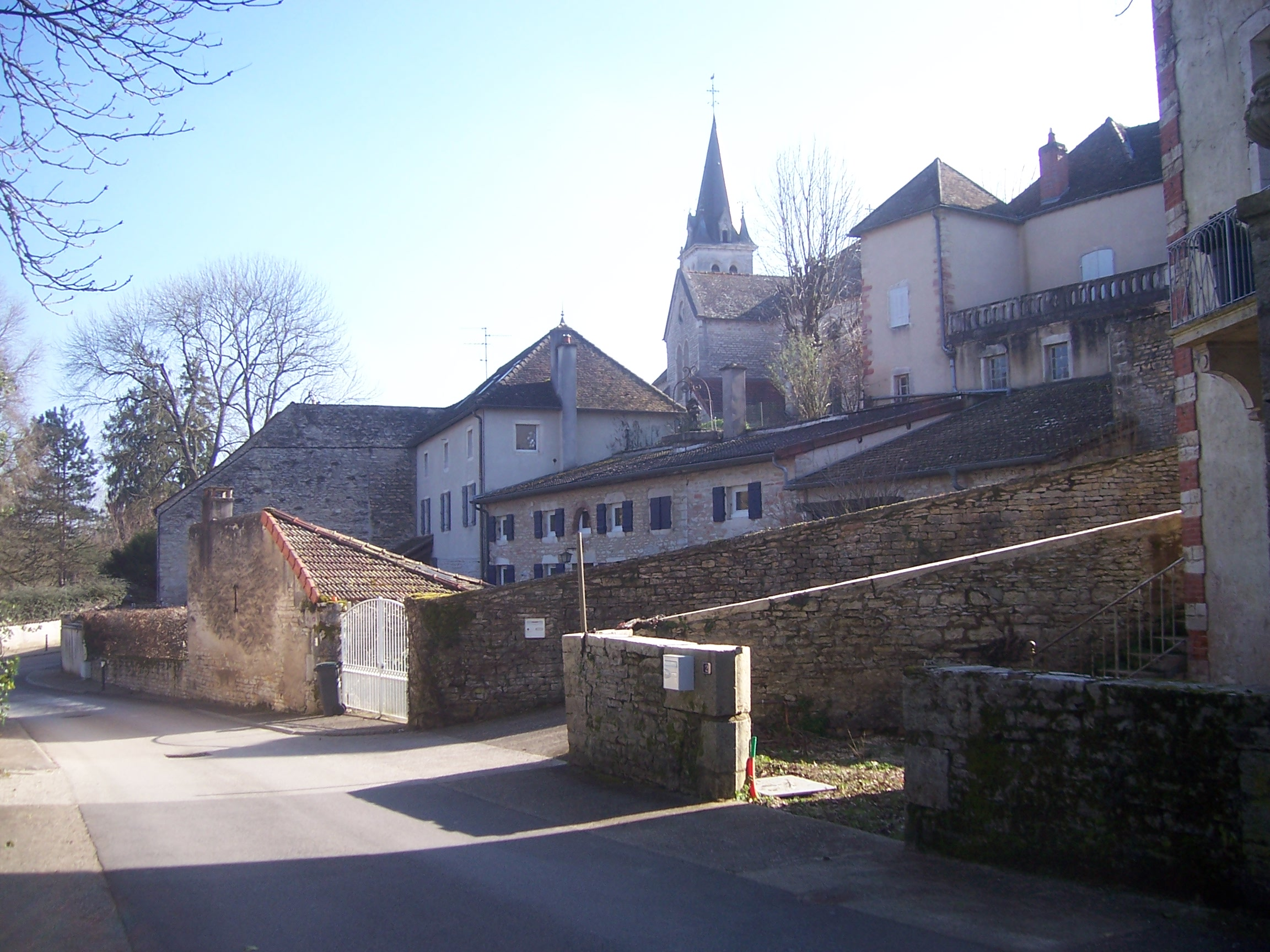
Town center

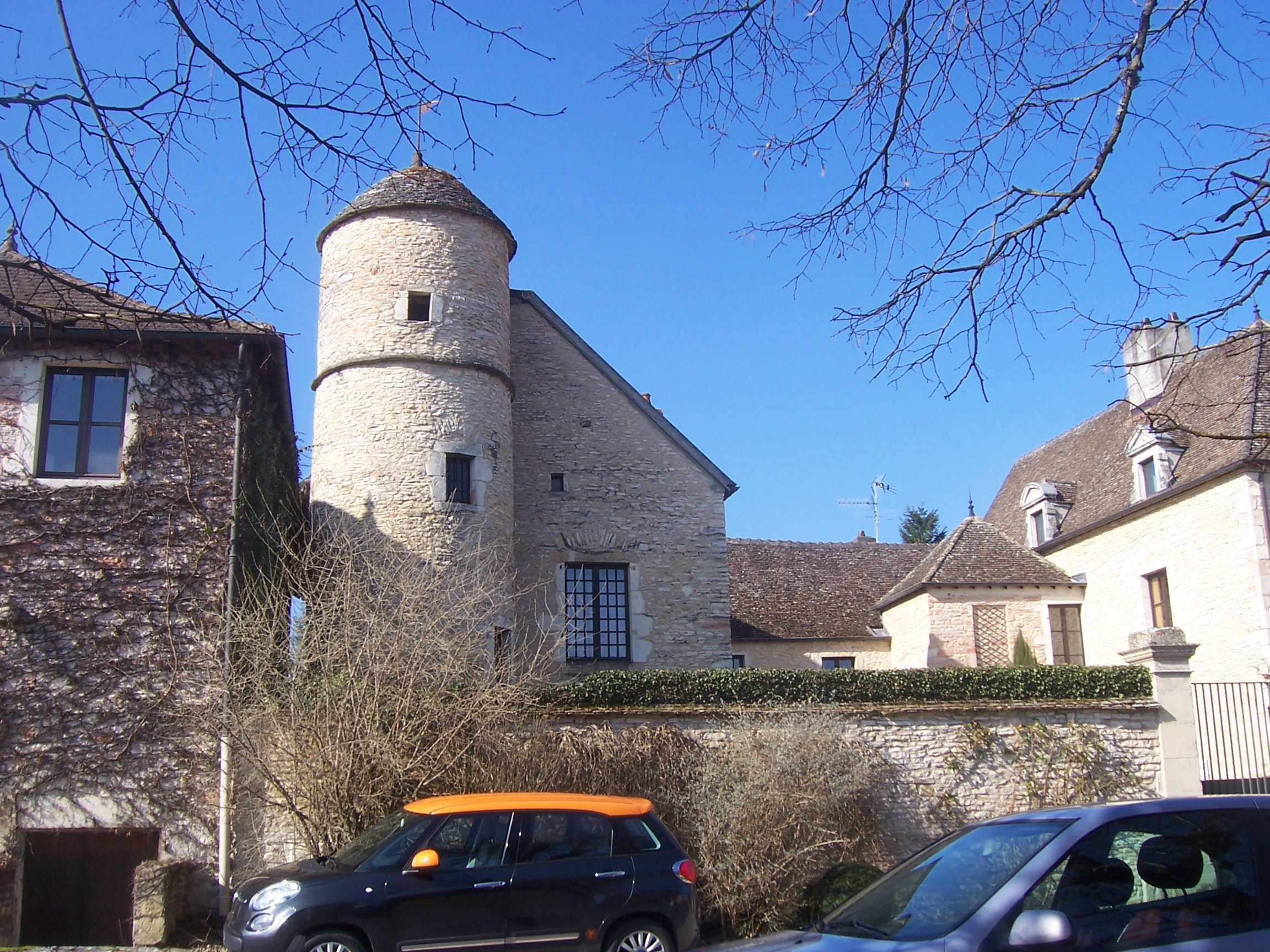
Town center

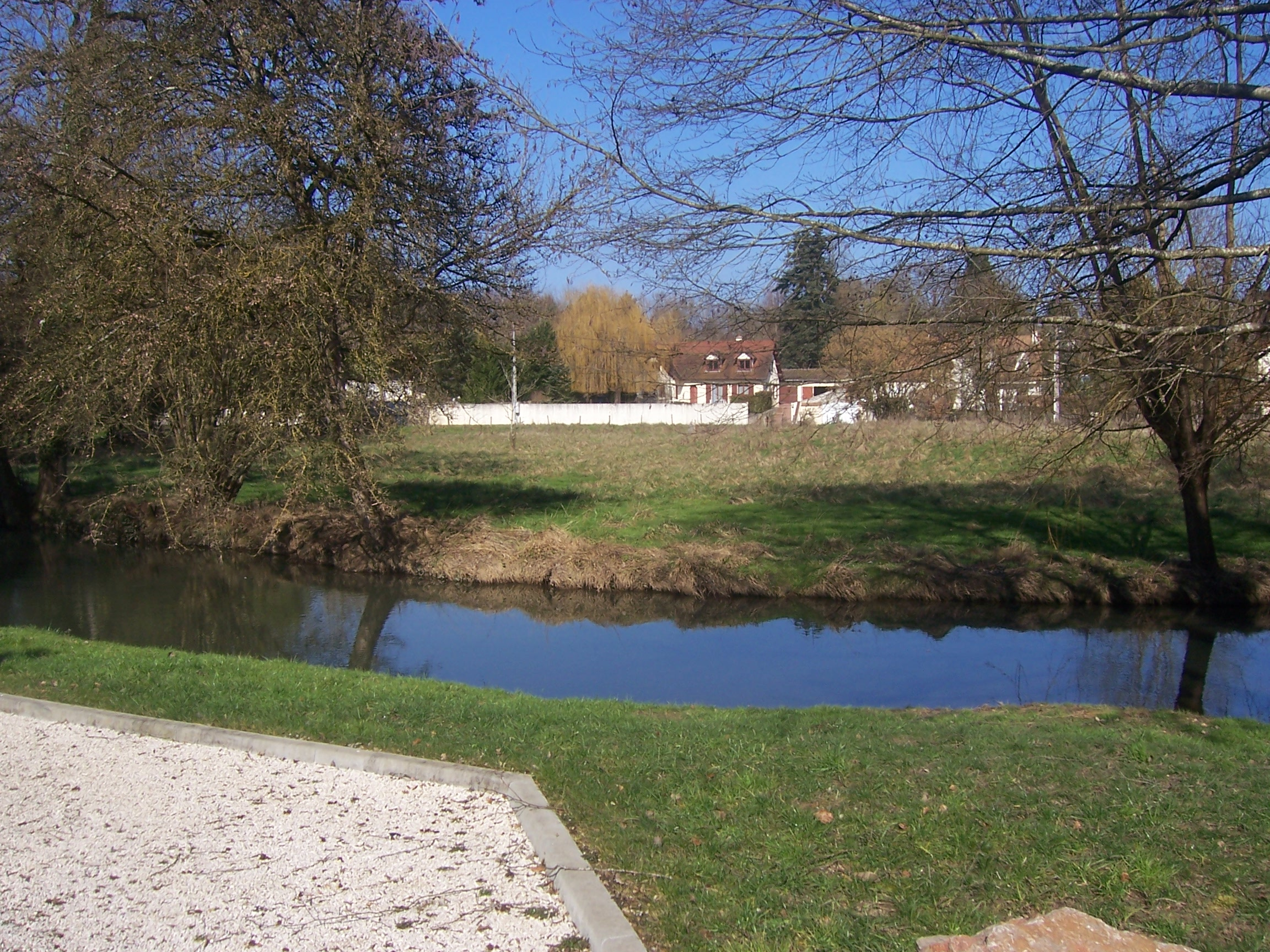
Villa Cardoni

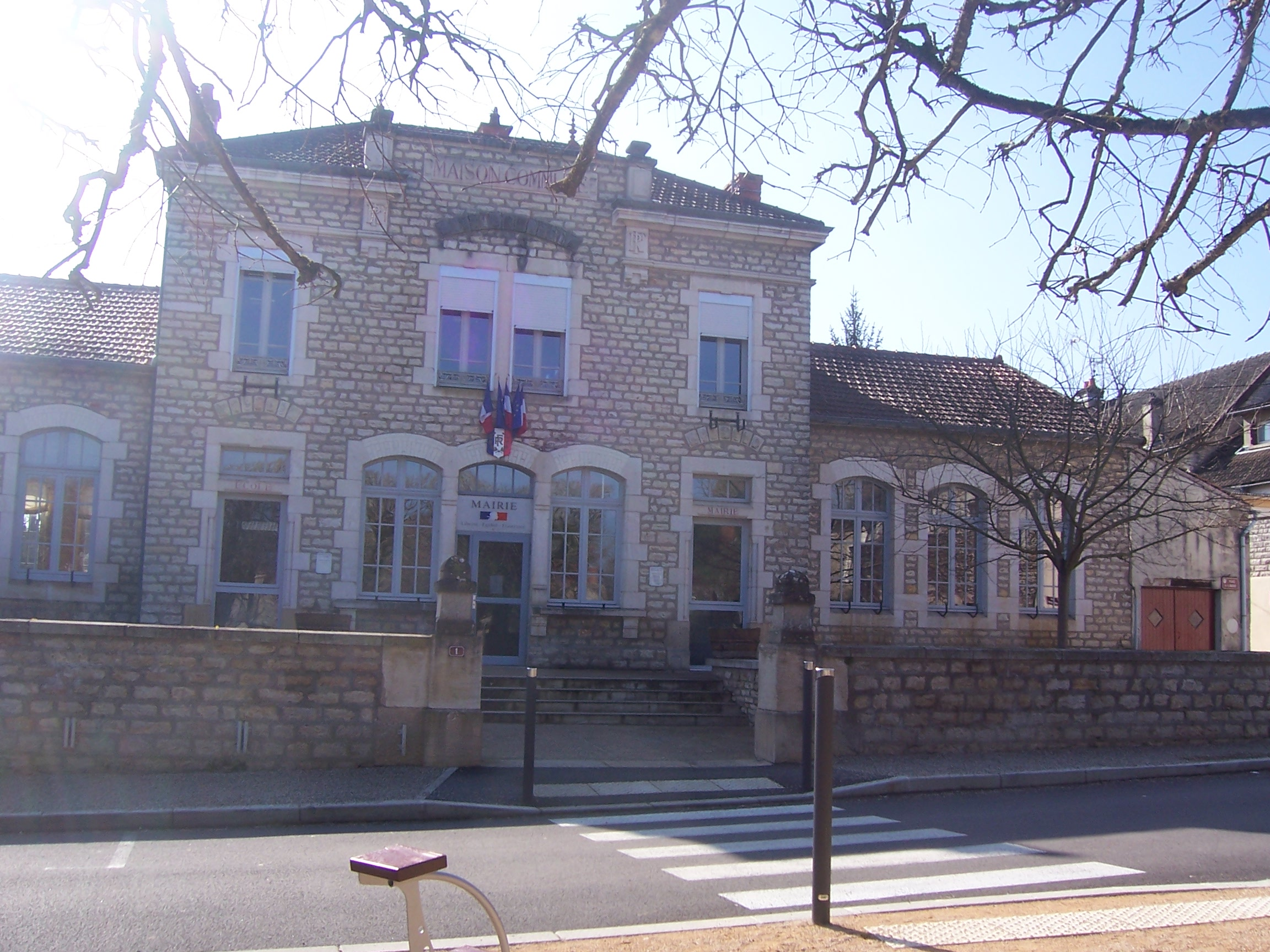
Town hall

== See also ==
- Communes of the Saône-et-Loire department
