= Givry, Saône-et-Loire =

Givry
- Commune
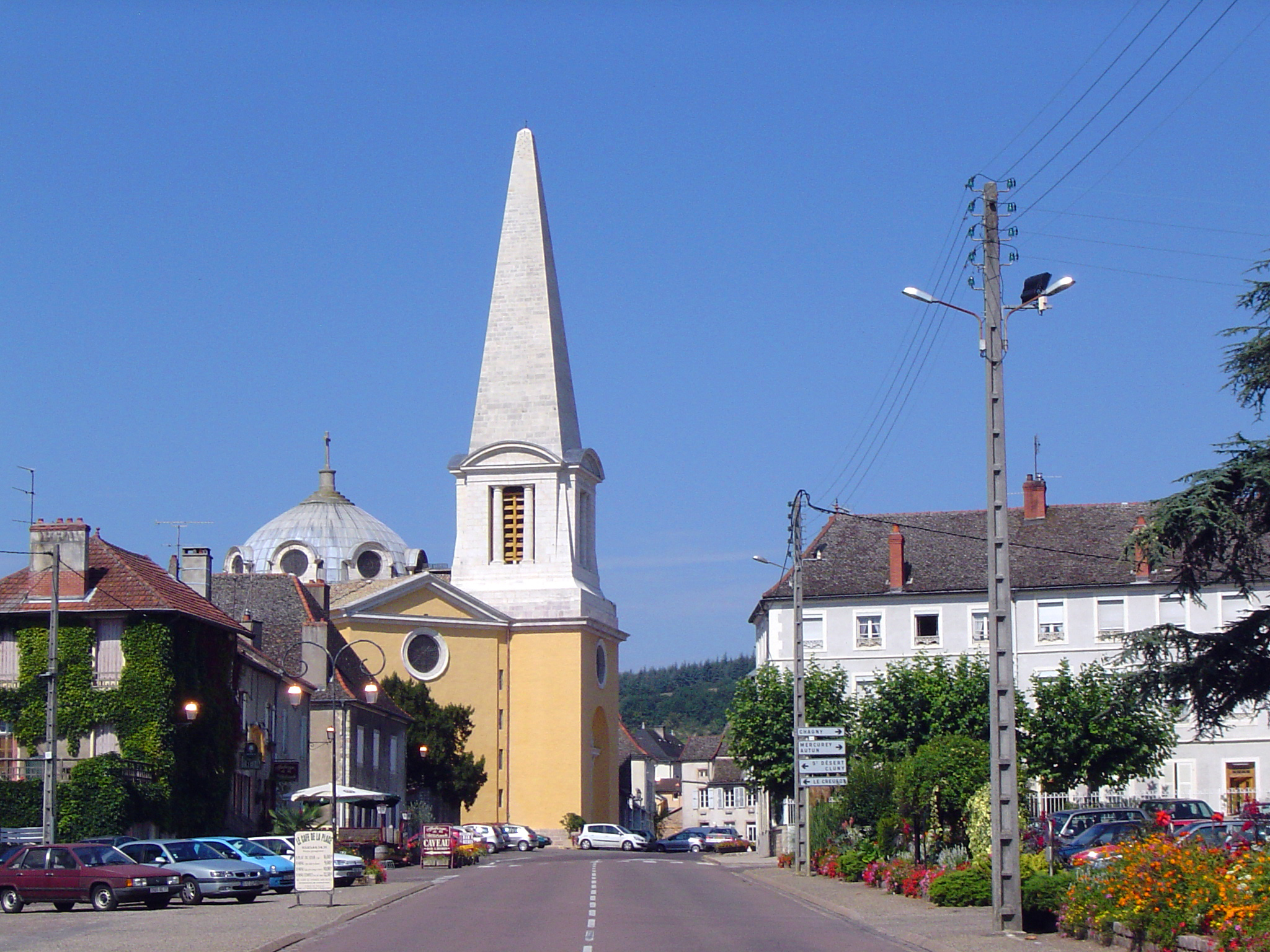
- The church and surroundings in Givry

- Coat of arms
- Location of Givry
- Location within France Location within Bourgogne-Franche-Comté
- Coordinates: 46°46′59″N 4°44′37″E
- Country: France
- Region: Bourgogne-Franche-Comté
- Department: Saône-et-Loire
- Arrondissement: Chalon-sur-Saône
- Canton: Givry
- Intercommunality: CA Le Grand Chalon

Government
  - Mayor (2024–2026): Jean Lanni
- Area^{1}: 26.03 km^{2} (10.05 sq mi)
- Elevation: 209 m (686 ft)
- Highest elevation: 447 m (1,467 ft)
- Lowest elevation: 181 m (594 ft)
- Population (2023): 3,598
  - Density: 138.2/km^{2} (358.0/sq mi)
- Time zone: UTC+01:00 (CET)
  - Summer (DST): UTC+02:00 (CEST)
- INSEE/Postal code: 71221 /71640
- ^{1} French Land Register data, which excludes lakes, ponds, glaciers > 1 km^{2} (0.386 sq mi or 247 acres) and river estuaries.

Givry (French pronunciation: [ʒivʁi]) is a commune in the Saône-et-Loire department in the region of Bourgogne-Franche-Comté in eastern France.

== Geography ==
Located 10 km (6.2 mi) from Chalon-sur-Saône, Givry is a small town, famous for its listed monuments and its wines. It is surrounded on the southeast by the commune's forest, and on the west by vineyards; the commune of Givry also includes three hamlets: Cortiambles, Poncey and Russilly.

== History ==
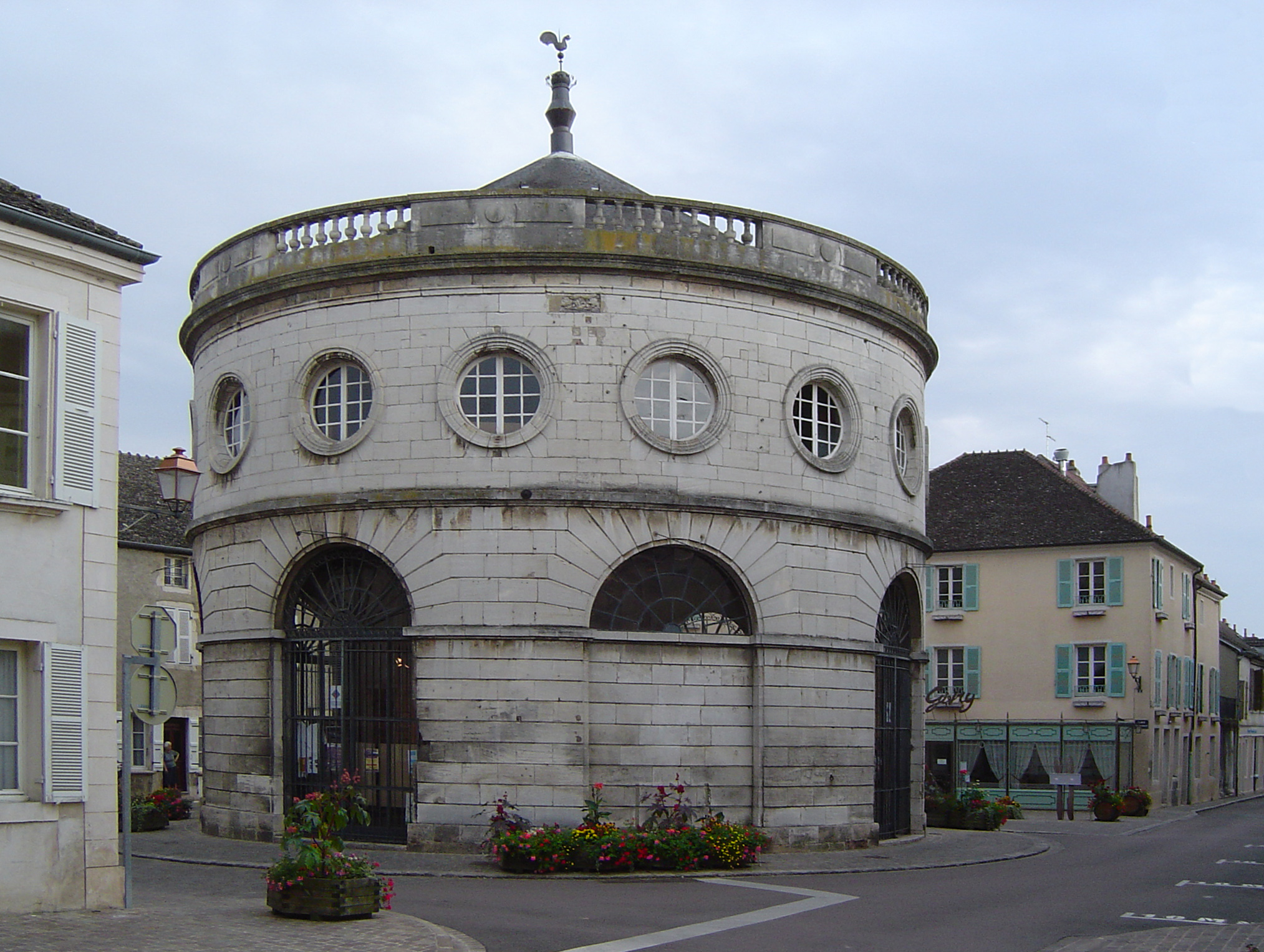
Circular grain market (Halle au Blé), by F. Narjoux of Chalon, 1825-30

Givry's foundation dates back to the Gallo-Roman era. Its fortifications were built in the Middle Ages. As of the 18th century, several architectural works were established. Givry's AOC wine makes part of the Côte Chalonnaise wealth. It is said that Givry wine was French king Henry IV's favorite.

Givry's population is rising steadily as the town is a greatly sought-after residential area. Turned towards tourism, the town is crossed by the Green Way.

- Jacques Doyen, fondateur de l'abbaye de Notre Dame de Cortiambles en 1299.
- Dominique Vivant, first director of the Louvre museum

== Population ==
Historical population
Year	Pop.	±% p.a.
1968	2,200	—
1975	2,560	+2.19%
1982	3,125	+2.89%
1990	3,340	+0.84%
1999	3,596	+0.82%
2007	3,678	+0.28%
2012	3,664	−0.08%
2017	3,705	+0.22%
2023	3,598	−0.49%
Source: INSEE

== Twin towns ==
Givry is twinned with:

- Oppenheim, Germany

== See also ==
- Communes of the Saône-et-Loire department
- Givry wine
