= Genlis, Côte-d'Or =

Genlis
- Commune
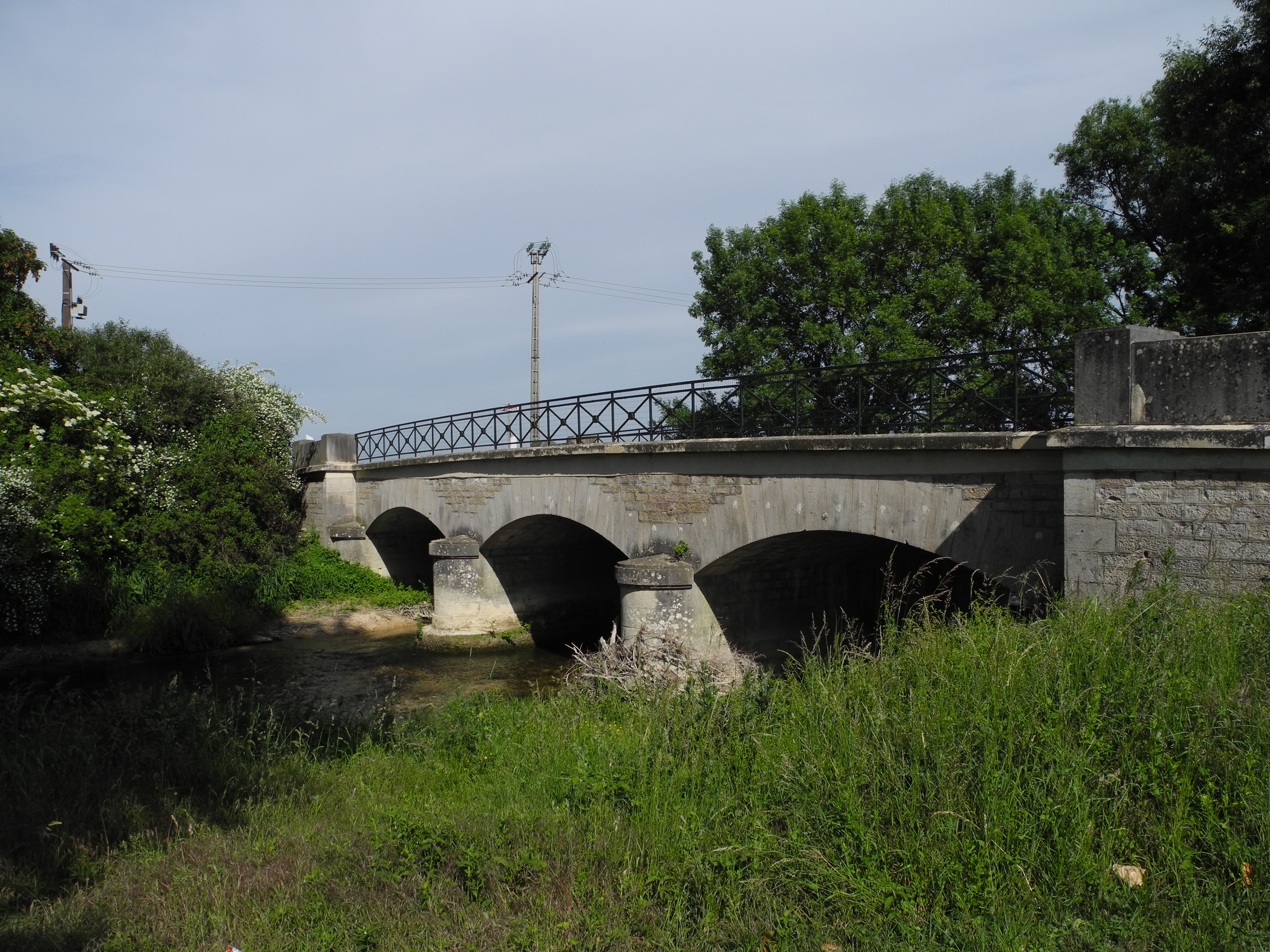
- Bridge over the Tille

- Coat of arms
- Location of Genlis
- Location within France Location within Bourgogne-Franche-Comté
- Coordinates: 47°14′30″N 5°13′26″E
- Country: France
- Region: Bourgogne-Franche-Comté
- Department: Côte-d'Or
- Arrondissement: Dijon
- Canton: Genlis
- Intercommunality: Plaine Dijonnaise

Government
  - Mayor (2020–2026): Martial Mathiron
- Area^{1}: 12.08 km^{2} (4.66 sq mi)
- Highest elevation: 205 m (673 ft)
- Lowest elevation: 193 m (633 ft)
- Population (2023): 5,093
  - Density: 421.6/km^{2} (1,092/sq mi)
- Time zone: UTC+01:00 (CET)
  - Summer (DST): UTC+02:00 (CEST)
- INSEE/Postal code: 21292 /21110
- Website: www.mairie-genlis.fr
- ^{1} French Land Register data, which excludes lakes, ponds, glaciers > 1 km^{2} (0.386 sq mi or 247 acres) and river estuaries.

Genlis (French pronunciation: [ʒɑ̃.lis]) is a French commune in the Côte-d'Or department. Male inhabitants are called Genlisiens and females are called Genlisiennes.

== Geography ==
The city of Genlis is located in the Côte-d'Or department in Bourgogne-Franche-Comté region and belongs to the Dijon arrondissement and Genlis canton. Genlis is situated 10 miles (16 km) southeast of Dijon. The closest villages are: Varanges at 1.41 mi (2.27 km), Beire-le-Fort at 1.77 mi (2.85 km), Labergement-Foigney at 1.80 mi (2.90 km), Longeault at 2.10 mi (3.38 km), Tart-le-Bas at 2.37 mi (3.81 km). All villages are in Côte-d'Or. Genlis has an elevation of 653 ft (199 m). Its area is 4.66 sq mi (12.1 km^{2}), its population density is about 421.61/km^{2}, and the geographical coordinate are 47.241°N 5.221°E.

The Tille and Norges rivers are the main waterways crossing Genlis. There is also the Creux-Jacques stream.

=== Transportation ===
The commune has a railway station, Genlis, on the Dijon–Vallorbe line.

== History ==
=== Etymology and toponymy of Genlis ===
In 867, Genlis was written Gediacensis finis, a spelling which probably originates from the Gallo-Roman name Aegidius or Genelius, the ancestor of the French first name Gilles because the Greek "D" often turns into an "L" in Latin.

The city of Genlis was not historically referred to by its modern name. Cartularies, including those of the Saint-Bénigne abbeys (future cathedrals), Tart, Clairvaux, and Cîteaux; chronicles, such as those of Bèze and Saint-Bénigne; and departmental archives all give details on the name's evolution over time. During Carolingian times, Genlis was called Getliacus. It was then called Gediacnesis finis in 867, Gliniacensis finis (868), Janlint (~1060), Genliacensis finis (11th century), Genlé/Genleium (1132), Genleio (1180), Janlée (1191), Jamleium (1234), Genlliacum (1235), Janli (1236), Genllé (1238), Janleium (1248), Genlerum (1249), Janlé (1260), Janleyum (1297), Genleyum (1285), Janley (1290), Jenlleium (1297), Jamley (1360), Jamleyum (14th century), Janly (1498), Janlis (1637), Jenlis (1666), Janlys (1679), Jeanlis (1685), Jeanly (1728), and Genlis/Janly in 1783. The name Genlis seems to have disappeared by the end of the 18th century.

=== First written account ===
The first written account mentioning Genlis dates back to approximately 866. The village is referred to as Finis Genliacensis (area of Genlis) in the chronicles of Saint Bénigne in an account of a public political assembly of prominent civil functionaries such as bishops, counts, and abbots, who were the King's advisors. These events were held in May or October.

The second oldest reference to Genlis was made around 1060. Berno of Genlis gives Saint-Pierre of Bèze some property he owns in the village of Coriant (which has since disappeared), reserving the income from it for his lifetime. St. Pierre has rights to the land but he will not be the owner until Berno dies, as emphasized in the Latin deed:

Notum sit omnibus praesentibus et futuris, quod Berno villicus Janlint Villae, quoddam alodum juris sui, quod jacet in villa Coriaut dicta, ea condicione dedit S. Petro, et propria manu super altare misit, ut ipsius alodi usuarium fructum retineret tempore vitae suae : post discessum vero vitae ad locum sancti Petri rediret cum omni integritate. Hujus donationis, quam viva voce fecit, vivos testes adhibuit; quorum nomina haec sunt : Odilo Praepositus, Rodulfus, Dado, Aldo, Ewardu. Let it be known to all, present and future, that Berno the steward of Villa Janlint, a certain successor of his own right, which lies in the village called Coriaut, gave this on condition to St. Peter, and put it in his own hand upon the altar, so that the user of Alodi might retain the fruit during the time of his life. but after departing from life, he returned to the place of St. Peter with all integrity. He gave living witnesses to this donation, which he made orally; whose names are these: Odilus the Provost, Rodulf, Dado, Aldo, Eward.

=== Roman and Gallo-Roman eras ===
The Genlis site has been occupied since the time of the Romans. A fortified military outpost that was the starting point of a Roman road called Chemin des Romains or Chaussée Brunehaut, proves the Romans had a military presence in the area. In 1973, a Gallo-Roman villa was found by aerial surveillance.

"Inside of the Gallo-Roman castrum, recognized thanks to its corner towers and its doubled perimeter walls, there were traces of simple buildings, most of them having only a single room, displaying the disorderly lines that date to modern times. Could these buildings be rural settlements close to the fortress?"

The Chemin des Romains linked Genlis to Arceau. Several archaeological discoveries, such as at Izier, Cessey-sur-Tille, Bressey-sur-Tille and Arc-sur-Tille, were made at this part of the road. Arc-sur-Tille was where the Roman road coming from Genlis intersected with the road going from Besançon-Alise-Sainte-Reine to Alise. A bronze statuette of the early empire and two statuettes of Mercury were found during excavations. Bressey-sur-Tille was located on the road that extended to Arcelot to the north and Genlis to the south. Finally, the Chemin des Romains linked the nearby village of Arceau to Dijon and Mirebeau.

Archaeological digs of the Johannot and Voie Romaine areas, located between Genlis and Izier, unearthed artifacts dating from the late Iron Age. The Gallo-Roman period is represented by remains of a cremation necropolis from 1

AD located on Johannot. Several vases and pieces of Gaulish currency were found at the edge of the Voie romaine. Gaulish ceramic and amphora shards from 1 AD were discovered in a ditch between the sites, and the remains of a Merovingian village were also found nearby.

=== Merovingian Genlis ===
In the early 1990s, construction work on the Highway A39 Dijon-Dole revealed the ruins of a Merovingian village at the localities of le Johannot and la Borde. These digs revealed the existence of twenty-nine wooden semi-buried rectangular structures called "hut foundations". Their sizes vary from 1.8 to 5.9 metres (5 ft 11 in to 19 ft 4 in) in length, and 1.7 to 5.5 metres (5 ft 7 in to 18 ft 1 in) in width with areas varying from approximately 4 to 8 m^{2} (43 to 86 sq ft). They served a variety of purposes, including storehouses, storages tanks, shelters for small animals, and workshops for weaving, smelting, bronze work or bone work.

Other kinds of buildings were identified as houses by the remains of several post holes. These homes differed in shape and dimension. Additional small structures are thought to be granaries on stilts and silos that contained samples of rye, wheat, elderberries, pears, millet, cabbage, black nightshade, but also wild plants, reflecting pictures of cultivated areas and meadow forage grasses. These 7th-century Genlissians were farmers and breeders as evidenced by the presence of barns housing oxen, pigs, goats, poultry and horses. The last structures to appear are ditches, palisades and paths.

Three graves were found during the digs. The first contained the skeleton of a young adult male measuring approximately 1.66 meters (5.4 feet). The second held an elderly adult buried in the same position about 30 to 40 meters (98 to 131 feet) from the first. Numerous degenerative osteoarthritis-type lesions were observed, particularly on the vertebrae. The subject was wearing an iron buckle plate on his belt dating from the first half of the 7th century. The third individual found was an adolescent male wearing a bronze buckle dated to the 6th century.

Among the objects excavated were ceramic shards from beakers, bowls, oules (pots), jugs and vases. Metal furnishings include nails, a bell, a twisted poker, knives and more.

=== Feudal period ===
From the feudal period until the French Revolution Genlis was a fiefdom subservient to the seigneury, later marquisate, of Mirebeau whose lords paid direct homage to the Duke of Burgundy. Huchey, Athée and Magny near Auxonne came under Genlis. In the 18th century, Genlis had 80 households and 400 parishioners, including Huchey. There was a market on Thursdays and two fairs a year. In the 18th century the Abbot Courtépée, in his Description générale et particulière du Duché de Bourgogne, reports that under the ancien régime Genlis was also a parish of the diocese of Chalon-sur-Saône, archpriesthood of Mailly, associated with Saint Martin and patronage of the priory of Saint-Vivant.

Feudal perks included the fortified house – later the château – of Genlis, as well as the various rights and privileges enjoyed by the lords. The lords of Janly and others who owned property in Genlis enjoyed the following rights and privileges.

==== Homage ====
Homage was required between suzerain and vassal to ensure stability and peace. Thus in 1340 the venerable Father Pouçard, abbot of Saint-Étienne de Dijon and landowner in Genlis, received homage from Symon in the presence of Raymond de Chailly and Jean Cultivier of the Dijon church and sworn notary, who acknowledged that he

“held in fief in the name of his wife, from the above-mentioned abbot, the meadows he holds on an island within the boundaries of Janly parish which adjoin the meadows of the said abbot. As for these meadows belonging in fief to the monastery, Symon, as vassal and man of the said abbot in the name of the monastery, swore faith and homage by the kiss which he gave the said abbot on the mouth, according to custom, thus promising him fidelity. Having done so, the said abbot requested that an official deed be drawn up, to be sealed with the seal of the church of Langres”.

==== Right of lodging ====
Anyone who was abbot of Saint-Étienne de Dijon could exercise this right. For a single time an abbot could, when he fit, lodge at Janley for a natural day with companions related to his state duties at the expense of the men of Janley. Abbot Robert de Bautigny exercised this right at Genlis in the thirteenth year of his office, accompanied by Jean Joliot, bailiff of the said monastery, and Guiot de Marandeuil, treasurer of Saint-Étienne, on the Wednesday after Easter 1399. They were lodged with Perrenot de Nouhet, the postmaster of Genlis, and after dinner held the court of justice. The abbot dined at the expense of the said Perrenot and took lodging. In 1432, the right of lodging was exercised by abbot Alexandre de Pontailler. On November 26, 1455, abbot Thibaut de Viard exercised this right.

==== The royalties and the tax granted to the sovereign ====
Elected members of Parliament would order inventories of households in order to assign and collect taxes, and Genlis and Huchey were assessed in 1375, 1431 and 1469. These household assessments also bring to light information on the taxes – royalties in this case – collected by the seigneurs in order to assign the taxes fairly. Note that a household subscribing to pay royalties paid a certain sum of money at a certain time of the year. This household escaped the seigneur's financial appetite and was no longer taxable or subject to limitless exploitation. A seigneur would agree to this arrangement in order to spare his sources of income at the risk of seeing his lands deserted.

From the 11th century until the French Revolution, the lordship was possessed by several families and was transmitted either by inheritance, dowry or sale. The first family that owned it was the eponymous family of Janly. The medieval lords of Genlis belonged to noble families. The men earned epithets of honor of 'knight', 'squire', 'noble man', 'messire' and 'noble lord' and their wives were described as 'damsels'. The various lords of Janly owned the lands of Genlis (formerly Janly), Saulon-la-Chapelle, Verchisy (a hamlet in Beurizot), Marcilly-les-Nonnains, Magny-la-Ville near Semur-en-Auxois, Montilles and Dracy-les-Vitteaux in allod.

==== House of Janly ====
Janly: Gules fretted Argent, a golden head with three cinquefoils

The House of Janly was described as the 'old house of Burgundy'. The name of the lords appears in texts from the 12th century and perpetuated until the 17th century. The Janly allied themselves with the Burgundian nobility resulting from the sword and the robe: Estrabonne, Vaux (now part of Auxerre), Mâlain, Colombier, La Marche, Fyot, Le Fèvre, Mazille, Charrecey, Daubenton, Sennevoy, Balay and Thienes. The Janly entered the Estates of Burgundy in 1355, shortly after their creation. This house is a younger branch of the house of Mailly-Fauverney, itself descended from the former counts of Dijon. The descendancy starts from a lord named Gui, probable brother of Etienne II, lord of Fauverney. The House of Janly included:

- Guy I (Gui) Mailly Fauverney, Lord of Janly (Genleio): He lived at the beginning of the 12th century. Gui was the husband of a lady called Eve, the mother of Maurice I, Lord of Janly and Roland Janly.
- Guy II de Janly (Genleio, Genley): The charter of the abbey of Saint-Étienne de Dijon, which can be roughly dated between 1125 and 1157, reveals that Guy, knight of Genlis, nicknamed Dernotus, gave the aleu de Genlis to the abbot Herbert and his claims on tithes to his brother Theodoric leaving for Jerusalem.
- Maurice II de Janly (Genleio): Around 1170, he donated a house they owned in Dijon to the Abbey of Tart, with his wife Elissent. He may have participated in the Third Crusade (1187–1192) since he was at the siege of Acre in April 1191. He perhaps became a Templar. He may be the father or brother of Benoît de Janly.
- Benoît de Janly (possible filiation): He is said to be a crusader, returned from the Holy Land in 1187, being alive till 1191.
- Ermengarde de Janly: She allied herself with a lord called Rodolphe. Her name is linked to a deed of sale for an eighth of the Loiche mill (or Liche in 1435) to the Saint-Étienne church in Dijon in July 1235. In this act are named her husband Rodolphe, her father Richard, her uncle Lambert, her cousin Maurice III and her grand-cousins Jean and Savoyen.
- Maurice III, lord of Janly (Genleio): In 1197, Maurice was the lord of Genley and knight. He gave the tithe of Janly to the priory of Saint-Vivant with the agreement and approval of Robert, bishop of Chalon and the Duke of Burgundy around 1197.
- Jean de Janly: He is Maurice's son. In 1233, Jean de Janly made a pious donation of a meadow to the Abbey of Auberive. This gift was approved by his suzerain, Guillaume II de Pontailler, dit de Champlitte, lord of Talmay and viscount of Dijon. In October 1265, Jean donated a census on the Pré Boiret and the right to open a path to go to the Loiche mill, the one he claimed on the mill and on the meix de Garandas, to the Saint-Étienne church. It is mentioned from 1235 to 1265. He had a daughter named Marie, with his wife Erembour.

==== House of Mailly ====
Mailly, from the Bourgogne branch: gules with three golden mallets

The origins of the family of Mailly back to the 10th century. Theodoric, Count of Mâcon and Autun, chamberlain of France under Louis the Stammerer, had two sons, Manasseh I and Aimar, Count of Dijon. Aimar, stem of the Mailly of Burgundy, lived in 901, during the time of Charles-le-Simple.

The historical origins of this family go back to Humbert de Mailly, Count of Dijon, husband of Anne de Sombernon. They had several sons including Wédéric (or Frédéric), the 'stem' of Mailly de Picardie; Humbert II de Mailly and Garnier de Mailly, abbot of Saint-Étienne de Dijon, friend of Saint Odilon, died in 1050 or 1051.

The Maillys, more precisely the branch of the Lords of Fauverney, probably gave birth to the first feudal house of the Lords of Janly. Indeed, among all the lands of Humbert de Mailly, there were several groups of lands including the two important seigneuries of Mailly and Longeault. Humbert owned or had rights to other seigneuries including Magny-sur-Tille, Cessey, Varanges, Arc-sur-Tille, Arceau, Quetigny, Chevigny-Saint-Sauveur and Bressey-sur-Tille. The seven sons of Humbert all took the name of the land they received from their father. The seigneury of Janly passed to the Maillys, probably by inheritance.

==== House of Montmorot ====
Montmorot: Lozengy Argent and Gules

The Maison de Montmorot originates from a village near Lons-le-Saunier in the county of Burgundy. Before the spelling of its name stabilized, it was written as Montmorey, Montmoret or Montmorot.

- Richard de Montmorot: He was the son of Humbert, nicknamed Arragon of Montmorot, was a knight, lord of Marigna and bailiff of Dijon in 1278 by succession to Jean d'Arcey. In 1270, he married Huguette de la Bruyère but had no descendants. She gave him the estates located between Grosne and Arroux, in Saône-et-Loire as a dowry. In February 1287, he founded the Sainte-Madeleine chapel in the Saint-Vincent de Chalon church with his wife Huguette. In his second marriage, in or around 1290, he married Alix d'Estrabonne (or Étrabonne), from an old family of good nobility in the county of Burgundy. Alix, described as lady of Janly, was included in the act of confederation of the lords of Burgundy, Champagne and Forez, made in November 1314, to oppose the levying of taxes that Philip the Fair wanted to establish on the nobles. Richard died before 1297. Richard and Alix had four sons: Guillaume, Hugues, Richard and Girard.
- Hugues (or Huguenin) de Janly: He abandoned the name of Montmorot and instead used Janly. He was mentioned in 1297, with his mother, then a widow, during the act of the donation of Bouzeron to the canons of Saint-Léger. In 1325, he entered into a contract with the abbot of Saint-Étienne de Dijon, Ponce de Courbeton, to preserve the legal and seigneurial rights over the men that the abbey possessed at Janly. In 1325, Hughes made a transaction on trial with the abbey of Saint-Étienne about justice and their rights to finagle Genlis. In addition to the seigneury of Janly, he owned the seigneuries or estates in Uchey, Beire-le-Fort, Ouges, Pluvault, Saulon-la-Chapelle, Mailly, Gevrey, Barges, Volnay, Saint-Loup, Lux, Givry and Mellecey. Hugh of Janly had five children: William I, the young Hughes, William II, Huguette and Alips. He died before 1363.
- Guillaume de Janly: He was the lord of Janly and Saulon-la-Chapelle, made several notable transactions and held various positions during the mid to late 14th century. In July 1363, he leased all his land in Saulon-la-Chapelle, including men, land, and meadows, for 50 florins per year. That same year, he served as a squire in the company of Oudard d'Uchey. By 1365, he was a squire in the company of Hugues Aubriot, bailiff of Dijon, alongside Richard d'Uchey and Jean de Mellecey. In 1367, Guillaume appointed Dreue Felise as his advisor for life. On 20 July 1368, with the consent of his niece Jeannette, daughter of Hugues de Janly the younger, he ceded all inheritances, rights, justice, and sizes located in Mailly-Curtil to Henri de Trouhans, known as Petitjean. In 1373, he received homage from Jean Le Guespet. Huguenin de Varennes, a squire, took over the fiefdom in 1375 and provided an enumeration of half the jurisdiction of the parishes of Varennes, Saint-Loup, and Lux near Chalon. In 1380, Guillaume declared to the Duke of Burgundy that the land and stronghold of Maigny near Auxonne belonged to him. His name disappeared from records after 1380. Guillaume de Janly appears not to have married or left any legitimate heirs.
- Jean, bastard of Janly: He appears in the texts in 1390 under the name of noble man, Jean, the bastard of Janly. In 1398, he was qualified as a squire. An enumeration is given in the year 1399 to Jean de Tenarre, squire, lord of Janly by Jean, the bastard of Janly, squire, of several feudal inheritances located in the finages of Janly and Uchey. He later said that the late William, Lord of Janly, gave him 200 cubits of land to take over all of Janly's land. Some of his inheritances joined those of the heirs of Richard d'Uchey, squire. Guillaume de Janly does not appear to have been married and Janly's bastard could be his illegitimate son, or that of William II. He married a young lady named Isabelle.
- Alips (or Alix) de Janly: She allied herself with Philibert de Tenarre in 1365. It was through her that the House of Tenarre acquired the seigneury of Janly.

==== House of Tenarre ====
Tenarre de Montmain: Azure with three golden chevrons

The house of Janly is succeeded by the house of Tenarre in the territory of Genlis. This house originates from Bresse Chalonnaise. The first known lord was Huguenin de Tenarre, knight. He lived in 1272. Although old, this house belongs to the middle nobility, but it will be illustrated by prestigious endogamous alliances in the houses of Salins, Choiseul, Saulx, Neufchâtel and Bauffremont. The barons of Tenarre owned large portions of the seigneury of Janly, including the fortified house, for almost two centuries from 1386 to 1565.

- Philibert de Tenarre: He is the son of Philibert de Tenarre, baron of Tenarre, lord of Grosbois, Verchisy and Agnès de Fontaines. He was the baron of the said places and acquired rights on the seigneury of Janly by his marriage to Alips de Janly. Their sons were Jean, Lord of Janly, squire and Guillaume, baron of Tenarre, knight. Philibert de Tenarre was a witness for Duke Philippe in 1361.
- Jean de Tenarre: He was the baron of Tenarre and Lord of Janly, who died before 1405. He married Jeanne de Montarbel, the daughter of Jean II de Montarbel, a knight and chamberlain of the Duke of Burgundy. Jeanne, who died before 1429, was the heiress of her brother Aymé and her sister-in-law Jeanne de Rougemont. Jeanne managed the family affairs, including the resumption of fief in 1409 and recovering the lands of Genlis. They had a son, Jean, and three daughters, Denise, Huguette, and Marguerite.
- Jean II de Tenarre: He was born in 1392 and died after 1448. His life is known through fragmented records of the acts he had passed. In 1440, he declared holding his stronghold of Marnoz under the Count of Burgundy. On 26 August 1460 he witnessed an agreement concerning the fortifications of Beaune. In 1430, Jean de Tenarre, a knight, was guardian to the children of the late Lord Guillaume de Colombier and Antoine de la Marche. He served as a counselor and chamberlain to the Duke of Burgundy. Jean married Catherine de Lugny around 1400, acquiring the land and seigneury of Montmain (or Montmoyen) and, through Catherine's mother, Jacqueline, the seigneury of Aiserey. They had two sons, Étienne and Jean III. His second marriage was to Claudine de Trézettes, daughter of Pierre, Lord of Trézettes, Uxelles, and Torcy, and Jeanne de Marcilly. After Jean's death, Claudine remarried Claude de Bussy, Lord of Montjay.
- Philibert de Tenarre: He died before 1501. He was titled Lord of Janly, Montmain, Vichy, Montagu and Grosbois. He first married Louise de Saulx, daughter of Charles de Saulx, Lord of Frezan and Gissey, and Antoinette Pot de La Rochepot on 13 July 1477. She died on 11 January 1481 without posterity. He married Claude (or Claudine) du Saix, of a noble family of Bresse, daughter of Antoine du Saix, lord of Rivoire, and Françoise de La Baume-Montrevel in second marriage. Claude, in her second marriage, on 11 December 1501, married Philibert de Bussy, squire, lord of Montjay, Montgesson and de la Sarrée. Philibert and Claude had one son, Claude and one daughter, Philiberte. Between 1484 and 1492, he acquired the mill of Boulay (Baudrières) from Jean Cloppet, doctor of law, president in Bresse, for 200 pounds.
- Claude de Tenarre: He was titled knight and lord of Janly and Montmain. He was a knight of the order of Saint-Michel. Like his ancestors, he participated in the political life of Burgundy. Thus, in 1526, he assisted with other nobles in the states of the county of Auxonne. He was a witness to the peace treaty between King Francis I and Archduchess Marguerite for neutrality between the duchy and county of Burgundy in Saint-Jean-de-Losne in 1522. He married twice and took daughters from prestigious and old noble houses as his wives. He first married Philiberte de Neufchâtel, daughter of Ferdinand de Neufchâtel and Claude de Vergy-Champvant. Claude had no children from this union. He married for a second time in 1544 with Constance de Bauffremont, daughter of Pierre II de Bauffremont, baron de Senecey, lord of Soye, Châtenoy, Hauterive, Courchaton, Nan, etc., and Charlotte d'Amboise. He attended the blessing ceremony of "the Oratory of Monsignor de Sennecey" in 1552. Claude died in 1565. From his union with Catherine de Bauffremont, he had two children: a son, Humbert de Tenarre and a daughter, Catherine de Tenarre.
- Catherine de Tenarre: She married Claude Faulquier (or Falque, Fauquier or Folquier), knight, lord of Marigny (Marigna), of a noble and former Franche-Comté house, originally from Poligny. She died in 1581 and was buried in the Bauffremont cellar in Senecey. It is through this union that the land of Janly entered the Faulquier family.

==== House of Faulquier ====
Faulquier de Marigna: Azure, three golden scythes, hilted Argent, two of the heads facing left

On 15 November 1565 a division was made between Claude Faulquier, knight, lord of Marigny (probably Marigna in the Jura), husband of Catherine de Tenarre, and Humbert de Tenarre, knight, lord of Montmain, of the property of the estate of Claude de Tenarre, knight, their father, lord of Montmain and Janly, with the agreement of Françoise de Bauffremont, lady of Missery, Jean and Charles de Malain, brothers, knights, lord of Montigny and Missery and first cousins of Humbert de Tenarre, lord of Montmain. The latter receives the land and barony of Montmain, the castle, the right of watch and guard and its dependencies which are the seigneuries of Grosbois, Champandrey, the meadow at Verrey or Vitrey in the seigneury of Pouilly, Trogny in part, Montaigny in part, the toll of Glainon, Jarlan and Gallon with in all justice, fief and mortmain. The barony had always been held openly without, however, guaranteeing this quality. Catherine de Tenarre received the land and seigneury of Janly, with the castle, the right of watch and custody, Uchey, the vines of Gevrey, the banal river, and all justice. The seigneury of Janly is estimated to be worth more than that of Montmain. Claude and Catherine separate from the seigneury in 1566, in favor of Jean de Bousseval. This sale breaks for the first time an uninterrupted family transmission for at least 400 years.

==== House of Bousseval ====
- Jean de Bousseval: Knight and lord of Villiers-le-Haut, Jonty, and Ravières, was the son of Philippe de Bousseval and Françoise Viguier. He served as governor and captain of the castle of Dijon. Jean married twice: first to Hélène Le Courtois, and then to Claude (or Claudine) Chabut. He died in 1571. After his death, Claude Chabut married Pétrarque du Blé, who became the new lord of Janly and died in 1586. Jean and Hélène Le Courtois had a daughter named Françoise.
- Françoise de Bousseval: She inherited half of the seigneury of Janly upon the death of her father. On 21 April 1574 the seigneury, along with Uchey and the vineyards in Gevrey en Montagne, was divided between Pétrarque du Blé and Françoise de Bousseval. She held the title of Lady of Villers-les-Eaux. On 22 January 1545 she married Antoine II Le Bascle, a squire and baron of Argenteuil en Tonnerrois, and lord of du Puy-Basle and Varennes.

==== House of Blé ====
Du Blé d'Huxelles: gules with three golden chevrons

The Blé (or Bled) house, one of the oldest in Burgundy, originates from Chalonnais. The du Blé dates back to Geoffroy du Blé, a knight who lived in 1235, lord of Cormatin and Massilly.

- Pétrarque du Blé: He was the lord of Cormatin, Mandelot and Cussy-la-Colonne. He became the baron of Huxelles after the exchange made between Catherine and Jacqueline de Villers-la-Faye de Sercy, of the land of Uxelles against that of Sercy. Catherine was the eldest daughter of Claude de Villers-la-Faye, Lord of Sercy, Baron of Huxelles and Anne de Groslée. She married Pétrarque du Blé in October 1537. Petrarch's second wife, Claude Chabut, brought him a part of the seigneury of Janly. In 1540, the lords of Dracy-les-Vitteaux and Montilles Laurent and Philibert de Janly respectively and descendants of the first house which owned the seigneury of Janly had estates. properties and inheritances in Janly with Chrétien Macheco, adviser to the parliament of Dijon. He was born in 1518 and died after 1574. From his first marriage to Catherine de Villers-la-Faye de Sercy, Pétraque du Blé had eleven children.
- Jean du Blé: He became a Knight of Malta and died in 1571 during the naval battle of Lepanto at the age of 26.
- Hugues du Blé: Born on 17 October 1546, he was a monk in Cluny in 1554, a pupil at the Cluny college in Paris and a priest in April 1568. He became the prior of Menetou-Ratel and Saint-Marcel de Mâcon in 1568, replacing his uncle Jean du Blé. He is also prior of Cosne and Rully, and chaplain to the King. He died before 22 September 1584 in Saint-Marcel-lès-Chalon.
- Antoine du Blé: He held the titles of Lord of Cormatin, Rully, and Saint-Gilles, and Baron of Huxelles. He served as governor of the city and citadel of Chalon and lieutenant-general in the government of Burgundy from 1601 to 1611. Born in Sercy on 19 March 1560, he succeeded his father Pétraque and mother Catherine de Sercy in his titles and dignities. Jean led an active military career, participating in the sieges of Brouage (1585), Sedan (1587), and Chaumont (defense against the Reitres), and attending the Estates General of Blois (1588–1589). He fought in the day of Arques (1589), the sieges of Paris (1590) and Rouen (1591), commanded the Duke of Guise's men-at-arms in 1596, captured Marseille from the Spaniards, and conquered Savoy (1600). Jean began constructing the Château de Cormatin around 1618. On 9 September 1580 he married Catherine-Aimée de Bauffremont, with whom he had six children: Jean, Henri, Éléonore, Constance, Angélique, and Marie-Minerve.
- Éléonore (or Léonore) du Blé: She married François de Nagu in 1599, thus entering the House of Nagu.

==== House of Nagu ====
Nagu: Azure with three spindles Argent ranged in fess.

From the 14th century, it held a distinguished rank among the nobility of the province. Its name seems to come from the castle of Nagu near the village of Ouroux, located in the current Rhône department. The first of the Nagu who appears in history is called Jean, he lived till 1350 and was the lord of Magny and Fragny, as well as bailiff of the nobility of Beaujolais.

- Francis Nagu: Born in 1574, Francis Nagu was the Lord of Laye Belleroche, Tart-le-Haut, Longecourt and Janly; Baron of Lurcy and Marzé; 1st Marquis of Varennes; knight of the two orders of the king and of the parliament of Dijon; bailiff of Saint-Pierre-le-Moûtier; adviser to the king in his councils; captain of fifty men-at-arms; mestre-de-camp of the armies of His Majesty; governor of Aigues-Mortes and mestre-de-camp of the regiment of Champagne. François de Nagu married Éléonore du Blé d'Huxelles in 1599. He served at the siege of Laon in 1594. He became the mestre-de-camp of ten companies of footmen at the siege of Amiens in 1597. In 1611, he became the bailiff of Mâconnais and governor of Mâcon. He was the valet de chambre of the King's chamber from 1615, mestre-de-camp of the regiment of Anjou, in 1616, épée state councilor in 1617, marshal of camp employed under the prince of Condé in 1621, governor of Aigues-Mortes and Tour-Carbonnière on the resignation of the marshal of Châtillon on 29 August 1622, captain-coast guard of the Cévennes region in 1622, Ambassador to Sweden in 1631, mestre-de-camp of the regiment of Burgundy in 1631. In 1633, he became the marshal of camp employed in the army of Languedoc, took the fort of Brescou and established by the King commanding at Pont-à-Mousson. He stood out at the Battle of Avein, won in Flanders from the Spaniards by Marshals Vitry and Brézé in 1635. governor of Chalon-sur-Saône le23 August 1636, lieutenant-general of the armies of the King in 1637, is found the same year in this capacity at the Battle of Leucate, in Languedoc, where he fought very valiantly while sick as he was with a violent fever which led him to the tomb on following November. It was through her that parts of the seigneury of Janly entered the house of Nagu. They had eight children: Charles, Roger, Alexandre, Philippe, Françoise, Antoinette, Magdeleine and Charlotte.
- Charles de Nagu: He was the captain of fifty men-at-arms and camp master of the Champagne regiment. He was killed climbing in Louvain in 1635 without having been married and without descendants.
- Joseph-Alexandre de Nagu: He inherited the titles and lands from his father. He became the 3rd Marquis de Varennes, Baron of Marzé and Belleroche, lord of Longecourt, Tart-le-Haut, Laye Quincié, Marchampt etc. and Seneschal of Lyon (in 1674). He was appointed cornet in the regiment of Schomberg, in the army of Portugal, in 1663. He was captain in the same regiment in the Dutch war in 1672 and 1673. He was mestre-de-camp of a cavalry regiment of his name in 1675. He was promoted brigadier on 14 August 1678 and field marshal on 30 March 1693. He was made commander-in-chief in the three bishoprics on 7 December 1701 and becomes lieutenant-general of the armies of the king on 24 February 1702. He was the governor of Bouchain in October 1704. He died in Paris on 6 June 1714. Joseph-Alexandre marries Gabrielle du Lieu, daughter of Jean-Baptiste du Lieu, Lord of Charnay, King's adviser, provost of merchants of the city of Lyon. He sold all the land and cens he owned to Janly in 1670 in the Valons, more precisely to Jacques-Louis de Valon.

==== House of Valon ====
Valon: Azure with a passing argent unicorn

The authentic filiation goes back to the brothers Henri, Odon and Jean Walon, squires at Boux-sous-Salmaise, in 1394. The Valons have been associated with Genlis since at least on 13 June 1567, when Nicolas Valon, Lord of Barain, buys from Marie de Machecot a quarter by undivided number of several inheritances in cens located at Janly. In 1576 the same Nicolas bought the other three quarters, half of which was undivided from several inheritances and cens owned by Guillemette de Senevoy, widow of Philibert de Janly, Lord of Montilles, from Janly. He acquired the rest of Laurent de Janly, Lord of Dracy-les-Vitteaux.

==== House of Fyot ====
Fyot: Azure, a chevron between three lozenges or.

The Fyot house has been known since the 14th century. Originally from Châtillon-sur-Seine, Guillaume Fyot, who lived in 1382, married Odette de Janly, descendant of the lords of Janly by the Montmorots and the Girart de Janly, as we mentioned above. Notable, the Fyots occupy an advantageous social position which will lead them to the highest parliamentary offices and the Burgundian magistracy and they will ally themselves with the greatest names of the nobility of dress and sword of the province. The descendants of Guillaume Fyot form two branches: that of the Fyot of La Marche and that of the Fyot of Vaugimois. It is the first branch which illustrates the name with five First Presidents and Presidents in Mortier in the Parliament of Burgundy who succeed one another from father to son from 1637 to 1772.

==== House of Janley ====
(Girart) of Janley: Azure a fess Argent accompanied by three cinquefoils of the same.

The first known lord of this branch is a lord named Girart. Girart de Montmorot adopted the name Janly or Janley, and his heirs would be known as Girart de Janly or Janley, and then de Janly or Janley starting from the 15th century. This branch, which became extinct in the 17th century, bore a variation of the coat of arms of the lords of Janly: azure with a silver fess accompanied by three cinquefoils of the same. The lineage of this branch is very fragmented and uncertain at times. They had properties or possessed the lordships of Janly, Chalon-sur-Saône, Mellecey, Saint-Maurice-en-Rivière, Yelley (near Chalon-sur-Saône), Montille, Verchisy, Magny-la-Ville, Dracy-les-Vitteaux, Fresnes-les-Montbard, Villiers-les-Hauts (in Auxois), and Jussy (in Auxerrois).

=== Feudal era ===
From the feudal era until the French Revolution, which would remove its benefits, the territory of Genlis was a seigneury. In the 18th century, Abbot Courtépée, in his Description générale et particulière du Duché de Bourgogne, narrates that under the Old Regime, Genlis was also a parish of the Châlon-sur-Saône diocese under the archpriest of Mailly, the patronage of Saint Martin and patronage of Saint-Vivant priory. From a feudal point of view, the Genlis seigneury was a back-fiefdom because it was part of the Mirebeau seigneury, then marquisate, where lords pledged homage to the Duke of Burgundy. Huchey was part of Genlis, and Athée and Magny close to Auxonne were attached to Genlis. In the 18th century, Genlis counted 80 burners and 400 communicants, as well as Huchey. The market was held on Thursday and two fairs per year.

Feudal marks are, for instance, the fortified manor house – then castle – of Genlis, as well as many rights and privileges that lords were benefiting. Janly lords and the people that owned properties in Genlis were also benefiting rights and privileges.

==== Homage ====
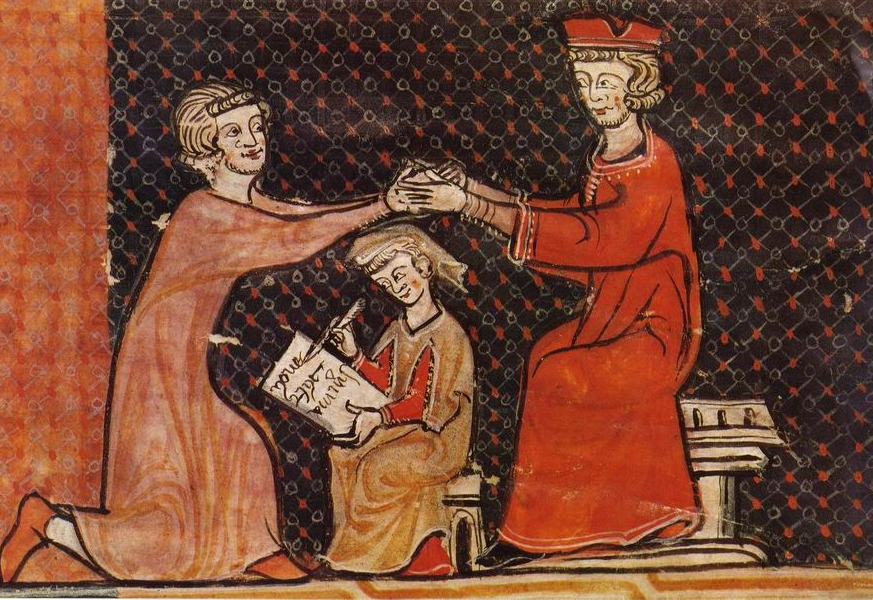
The seigneurial homage

The hommage was demanded between the suzerain and the vassal to ensure stability and peace. So in 1340, the venerable Father Pouçard, abbot of Saint-Étienne de Dijon and owner in Genlis, got the homage of Symon, along with Raymond de Chailly and Jean Cultivier, of the Dijon church and tabellion juror, who admitted he "owned a fief by his wife name, of the aforementioned abbot the meadows he owns in an isle of the Janley area, which are linking fields of the abbot, and about these meadows as monastery fiefdom, Symon, as vassal and man of the abbot on behalf of the monastery, pledged faith and homage of the kiss that the abbot gave to him on the mouth, in accordance with the tradition, promising him loyalty. Done, the abbot asked to establish an official act that would be sealed with the Langres church seal".

== Population ==
Historical population

Year	Pop.	±% p.a.
1793	858	—
1800	744	−2.02%
1806	766	+0.49%
1821	900	+1.08%
1831	969	+0.74%
1836	942	−0.56%
1841	952	+0.21%
1846	1,057	+2.11%
1851	1,087	+0.56%
1856	1,189	+1.81%
1861	1,212	+0.38%
1866	1,182	−0.50%
1872	1,160	−0.31%
1876	1,086	−1.63%
1881	1,131	+0.82%
1886	1,145	+0.25%
1891	1,084	−1.09%
1896	1,100	+0.29%
1901	1,144	+0.79%

Year	Pop.	±% p.a.
1906	1,163	+0.33%
1911	1,098	−1.14%
1921	1,095	−0.03%
1926	1,176	+1.44%
1931	1,276	+1.65%
1936	1,350	+1.13%
1946	1,389	+0.29%
1954	1,603	+1.81%
1962	2,264	+4.41%
1968	3,219	+6.04%
1975	4,129	+3.62%
1982	4,936	+2.58%
1990	5,241	+0.75%
1999	5,257	+0.03%
2007	5,484	+0.53%
2012	5,578	+0.34%
2017	5,315	−0.96%
2023	5,093	−0.71%

Source: EHESS and INSEE (1968–2023)

== Twinning ==
Genlis is twinned with two other European cities:

- Sprendlingen, in Germany
- Bogdanesti, in Romania

== See also ==
- Communes of the Côte-d'Or department
