= Is-sur-Tille =

- Commune
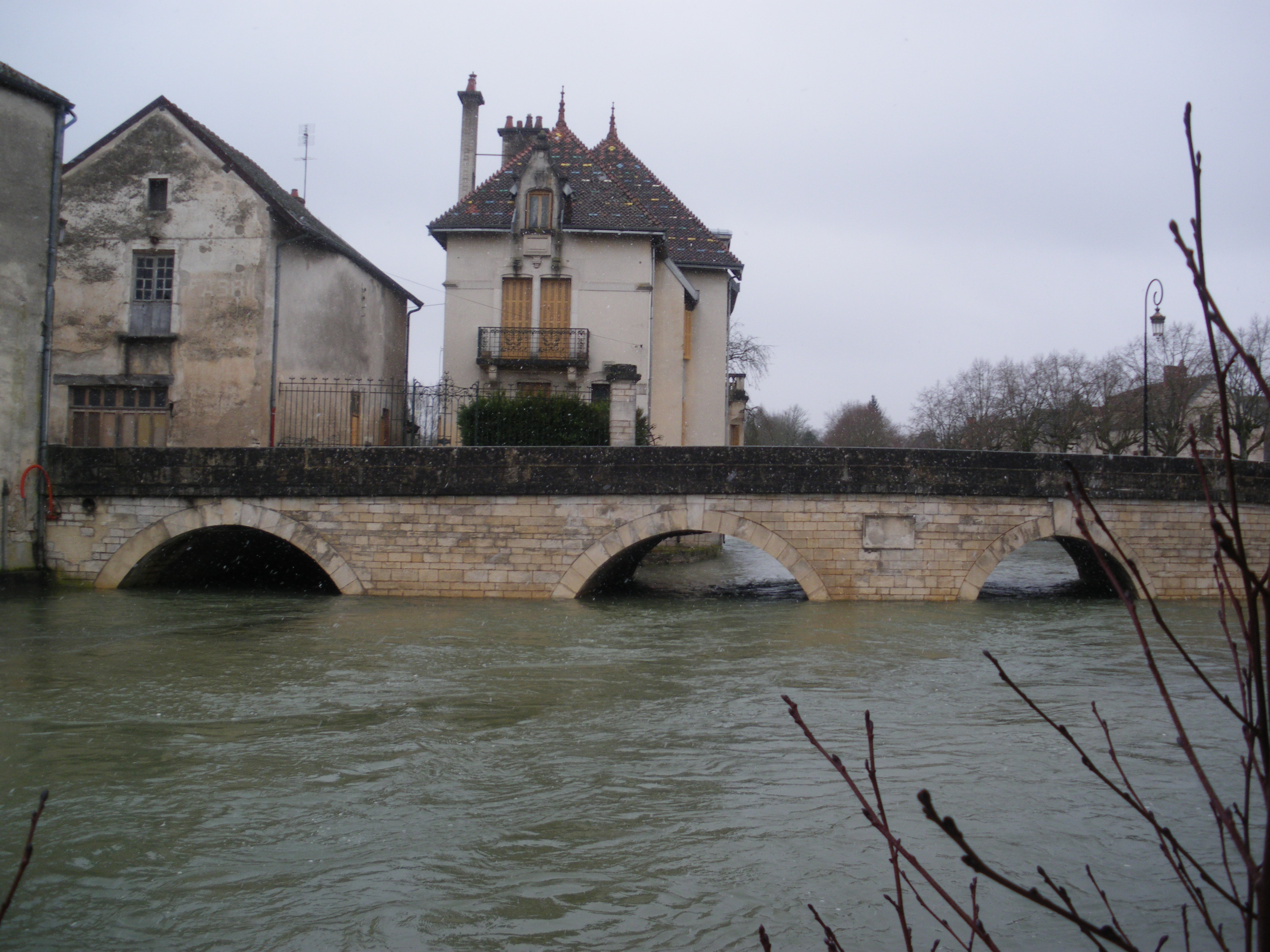
- The river Ignon at high water, in the centre of Is-sur-Tille

- Coat of arms
- Location of Is-sur-Tille
- Location within France Location within Bourgogne-Franche-Comté
- Coordinates: 47°31′18″N 5°06′58″E
- Country: France
- Region: Bourgogne-Franche-Comté
- Department: Côte-d'Or
- Arrondissement: Dijon
- Canton: Is-sur-Tille

Government
  - Mayor (2020–2026): Thierry Darphin
- Area^{1}: 22.53 km^{2} (8.70 sq mi)
- Elevation: 284 m (932 ft)
- Highest elevation: 408 m (1,339 ft)
- Lowest elevation: 262 m (860 ft)
- Population (2023): 4,302
  - Density: 190.9/km^{2} (494.5/sq mi)
- Time zone: UTC+01:00 (CET)
  - Summer (DST): UTC+02:00 (CEST)
- INSEE/Postal code: 21317 /21120
- ^{1} French Land Register data, which excludes lakes, ponds, glaciers > 1 km^{2} (0.386 sq mi or 247 acres) and river estuaries.

Is-sur-Tille (French pronunciation: [is syʁ tij]) is a commune in the Côte-d'Or department of Bourgogne-Franche-Comté France.

== Geography ==
Is-sur-Tille is located about twenty kilometers north of Dijon, on the river Ignon, close to its confluence with the Tille. To the west is a heavily forested limestone plateau with an elevation of over 400 meters. To the east is a humid clay plain sloping gently to the southeast of the Saône.

== Population ==
Historical population
Year	Pop.	±% p.a.
1968	3,448	—
1975	3,770	+1.28%
1982	4,200	+1.55%
1990	4,050	−0.45%
1999	3,926	−0.34%
2007	3,839	−0.28%
2012	4,365	+2.60%
2017	4,402	+0.17%
2023	4,302	−0.38%
Source: INSEE

== See also ==
- Communes of the Côte-d'Or department
