= Longeault-Pluvault =

- Commune
- Location of Longeault-Pluvault
- Location within France Location within Bourgogne-Franche-Comté
- Coordinates: 47°13′21″N 5°15′17″E
- Country: France
- Region: Bourgogne-Franche-Comté
- Department: Côte-d'Or
- Arrondissement: Dijon
- Canton: Genlis
- Intercommunality: Plaine Dijonnaise
- Area^{1}: 4.70 km^{2} (1.81 sq mi)
- Highest elevation: 198 m (650 ft)
- Lowest elevation: 189 m (620 ft)
- Population (2023): 1,174
  - Density: 250/km^{2} (647/sq mi)
- Time zone: UTC+01:00 (CET)
  - Summer (DST): UTC+02:00 (CEST)
- INSEE/Postal code: 21352 /21110
- ^{1} French Land Register data, which excludes lakes, ponds, glaciers > 1 km^{2} (0.386 sq mi or 247 acres) and river estuaries.

Longeault-Pluvault (French pronunciation: [lɔ̃ʒo plyvo]) is a commune in the Côte-d'Or department in eastern France. It was established on 1 January 2019 by merger of the former communes of Longeault (the seat) and Pluvault.

== See also ==
- Communes of the Côte-d'Or department
