= Carbonnière tower =

Historical monument in France

- Tour Carbonnière (French)
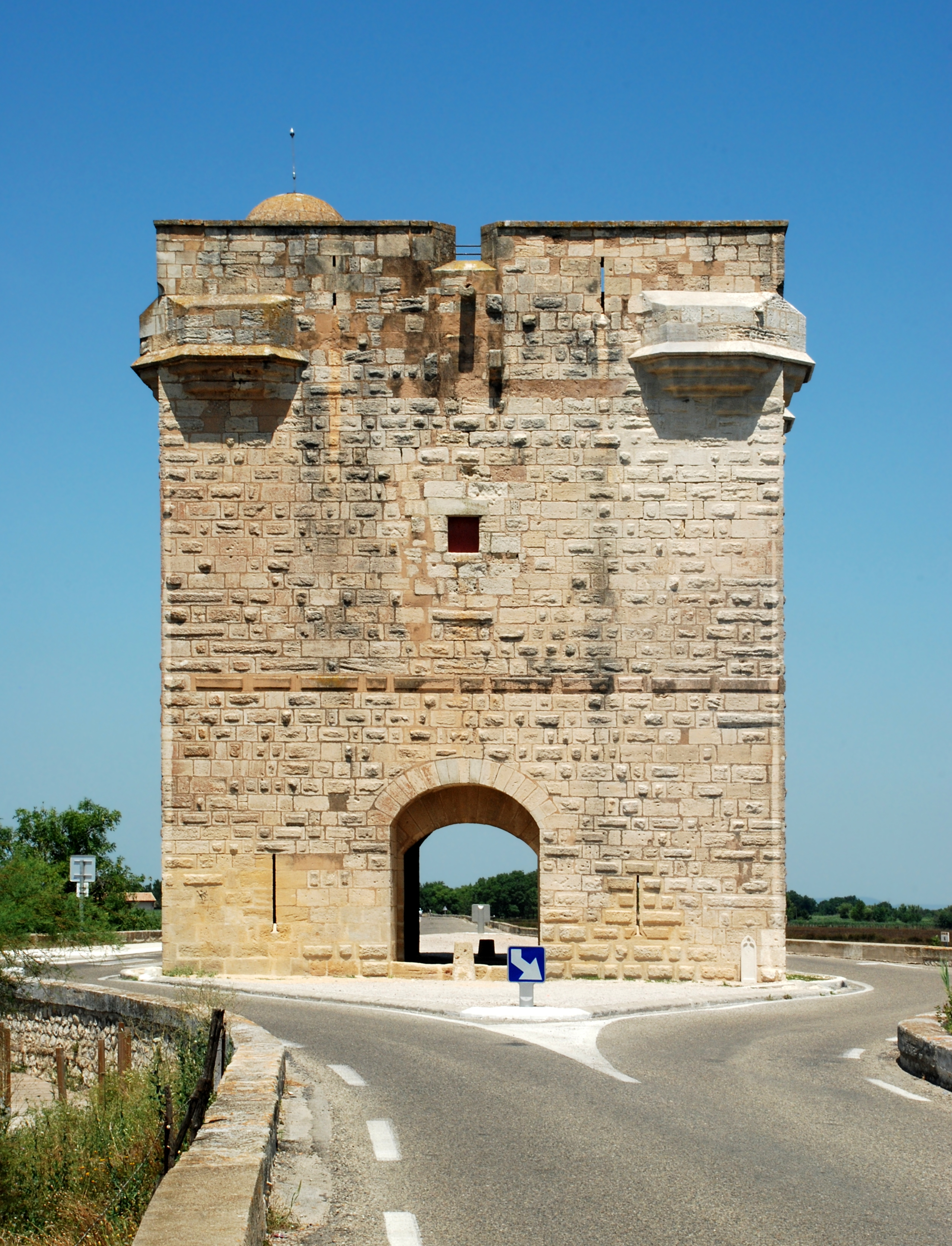
- The Carbonnière tower seen from the south

- Location within France
- 43°35′32″N 4°12′34″E
- Location: Saint-Laurent-d'Aigouze, Occitanie, France

History
- Built: 13th century

Monument historique
- Type: Classified

The Carbonnière tower (French: Tour Carbonnière, Occitan: Torre Carbonièra) is a watchtower built at the end of the 13th century to protect the walled city of Aigues-Mortes, in the French department of Gard in the Occitanie region.

== Location ==
The tower is located on the territory of the municipality of Saint-Laurent-d'Aigouze, in the Gard department in the Occitanie region. It stands in the middle of the marshes, between the Vistre and the Rhône canal in Sète, on the old road linking Saint-Laurent-d'Aigouze to Aigues-Mortes. Its terrace offers a panoramic view of the Petite Camargue.

The Carbonnière tower seen from the trail and the marsh.

== History ==
The Carbonnière tower was mentioned for the first time in a text dated 1346 which gives details on the function of the work: it is said that “this fortress is the key to the kingdom in this region."

Indeed, located in the middle of the marshes, it was the obligatory passage to reach Aigues-Mortes: its crossing was subject to a toll. It was held by a garrison made up of a squire and several guards. The terrace could support up to four pieces of artillery.

It has been classified as a historical monument since 1889.

== Architecture ==
The tower is built in ashlars to boss (ashlars with protruding central portion and seals accented), just like the Aigues Mortes ramparts. Halfway up, the tower features a row of more regular, darker-colored boss stones. Some ashlars show job marks similar to those found on the ramparts of Aigues-Mortes.

The road once crossed the tower, by a door defended by a portcullis and surmounted by a low arch. The base and the top of the southern and northern facades are pierced with two large loopholes. The parapet of the platform which surmounts the tower has a single niche on each face and a watchtower at each angle.

== The site today ==
At the end of 2009, the Carbonnière tower was the subject of work aimed at ensuring the safety of the public, in particular on the staircase and the terrace. A discovery trail has also been created in the surrounding marsh. These developments were carried out by the Centre des monuments nationaux, the DRAC of the Languedoc-Roussillon region and the Mixed Syndicate for the protection and management of the Gard Camargue, as part of the Grand site en Petite Camargue.
