= Cessey-sur-Tille =

- Commune
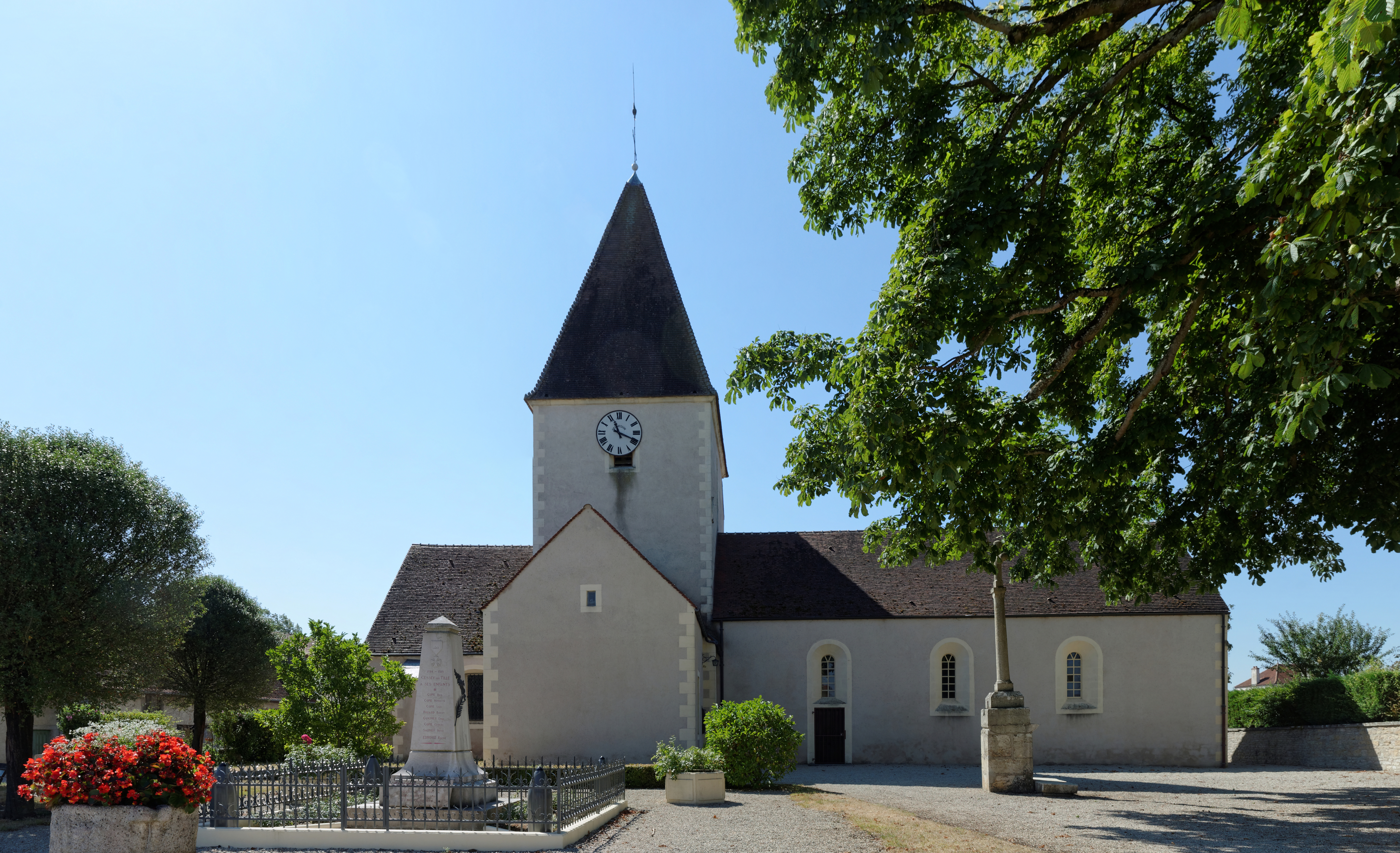
- The church in Cessey-sur-Tille
- Location of Cessey-sur-Tille
- Location within France Location within Bourgogne-Franche-Comté
- Coordinates: 47°16′53″N 5°13′20″E
- Country: France
- Region: Bourgogne-Franche-Comté
- Department: Côte-d'Or
- Arrondissement: Dijon
- Canton: Genlis
- Intercommunality: Plaine Dijonnaise

Government
  - Mayor (2020–2026): Jean-Pierre Colombert
- Area^{1}: 11.54 km^{2} (4.46 sq mi)
- Highest elevation: 229 m (751 ft)
- Lowest elevation: 201 m (659 ft)
- Population (2023): 637
  - Density: 55.2/km^{2} (143/sq mi)
- Time zone: UTC+01:00 (CET)
  - Summer (DST): UTC+02:00 (CEST)
- INSEE/Postal code: 21126 /21110
- ^{1} French Land Register data, which excludes lakes, ponds, glaciers > 1 km^{2} (0.386 sq mi or 247 acres) and river estuaries.

Cessey-sur-Tille (French pronunciation: [sesɛ syʁ tij], literally Cessey on Tille) is a commune in the Côte-d'Or department in eastern France.

== Population ==
Historical population
Year	Pop.	±% p.a.
1968	314	—
1975	347	+1.44%
1982	379	+1.27%
1990	402	+0.74%
1999	451	+1.29%
2007	538	+2.23%
2012	613	+2.64%
2017	622	+0.29%
2023	637	+0.40%
Source: INSEE

== See also ==
- Communes of the Côte-d'Or department
