= Arceau =

- Commune
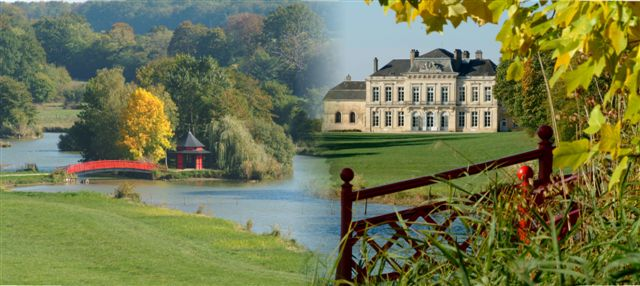
- Chateau and grounds

- Coat of arms
- Location of Arceau
- Location within France Location within Bourgogne-Franche-Comté
- Coordinates: 47°23′07″N 5°11′25″E
- Country: France
- Region: Bourgogne-Franche-Comté
- Department: Côte-d'Or
- Arrondissement: Dijon
- Canton: Saint-Apollinaire

Government
  - Mayor (2020–2026): Bruno Bethenod
- Area^{1}: 21.6 km^{2} (8.3 sq mi)
- Elevation: 229 m (751 ft)
- Highest elevation: 251 m (823 ft)
- Lowest elevation: 217 m (712 ft)
- Population (2023): 980
  - Density: 45/km^{2} (120/sq mi)
- Time zone: UTC+01:00 (CET)
  - Summer (DST): UTC+02:00 (CEST)
- INSEE/Postal code: 21016 /21310
- ^{1} French Land Register data, which excludes lakes, ponds, glaciers > 1 km^{2} (0.386 sq mi or 247 acres) and river estuaries.

Arceau (French pronunciation: [aʁso]) is a commune in the Côte-d'Or department in Bourgogne-Franche-Comté in eastern France.

== Population ==
Historical population
Year	Pop.	±% p.a.
1968	356	—
1975	367	+0.44%
1982	456	+3.15%
1990	526	+1.80%
1999	569	+0.88%
2007	627	+1.22%
2012	755	+3.79%
2017	897	+3.51%
2023	980	+1.49%
Source: INSEE

== See also ==
- Communes of the Côte-d'Or department
