= Pluvault =

Commune in Côte-d'Or, France

- Part of Longeault-Pluvault
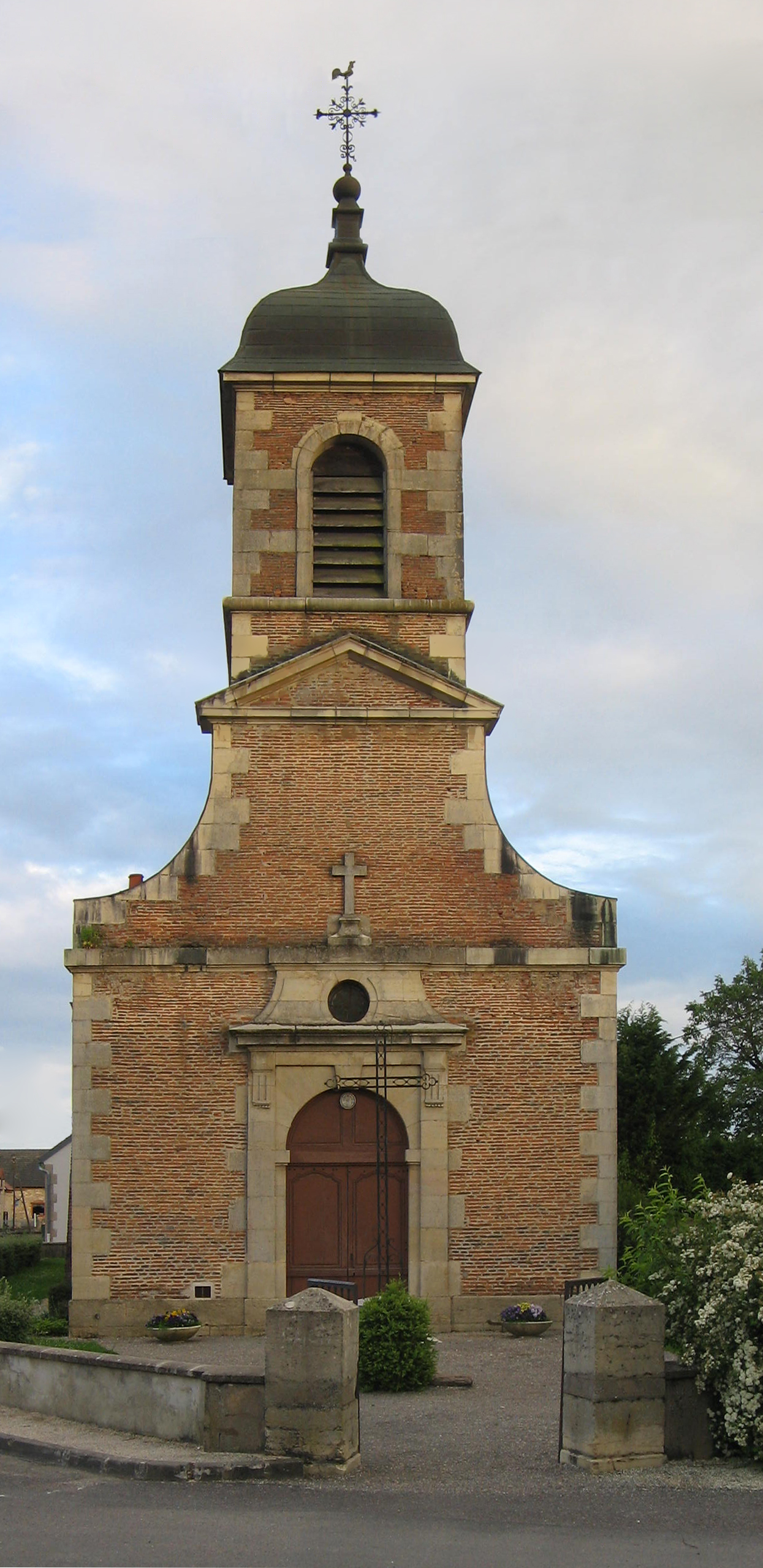
- The church in Pluvault

- Coat of arms
- Location of Pluvault
- Location within France Location within Bourgogne-Franche-Comté
- Coordinates: 47°12′45″N 5°15′19″E
- Country: France
- Region: Bourgogne-Franche-Comté
- Department: Côte-d'Or
- Arrondissement: Dijon
- Canton: Genlis
- Commune: Longeault-Pluvault
- Area^{1}: 3.46 km^{2} (1.34 sq mi)
- Highest elevation: 197 m (646 ft)
- Lowest elevation: 189 m (620 ft)
- Population (2023): 618
  - Density: 179/km^{2} (463/sq mi)
- Time zone: UTC+01:00 (CET)
  - Summer (DST): UTC+02:00 (CEST)
- Postal code: 21110
- ^{1} French Land Register data, which excludes lakes, ponds, glaciers > 1 km^{2} (0.386 sq mi or 247 acres) and river estuaries.

Pluvault (French pronunciation: [plyvo]) is a former commune in the Côte-d'Or department in eastern France. On 1 January 2019, it was merged into the new commune Longeault-Pluvault.

== See also ==
- Communes of the Côte-d'Or department
