= Beire-le-Fort =

- Commune
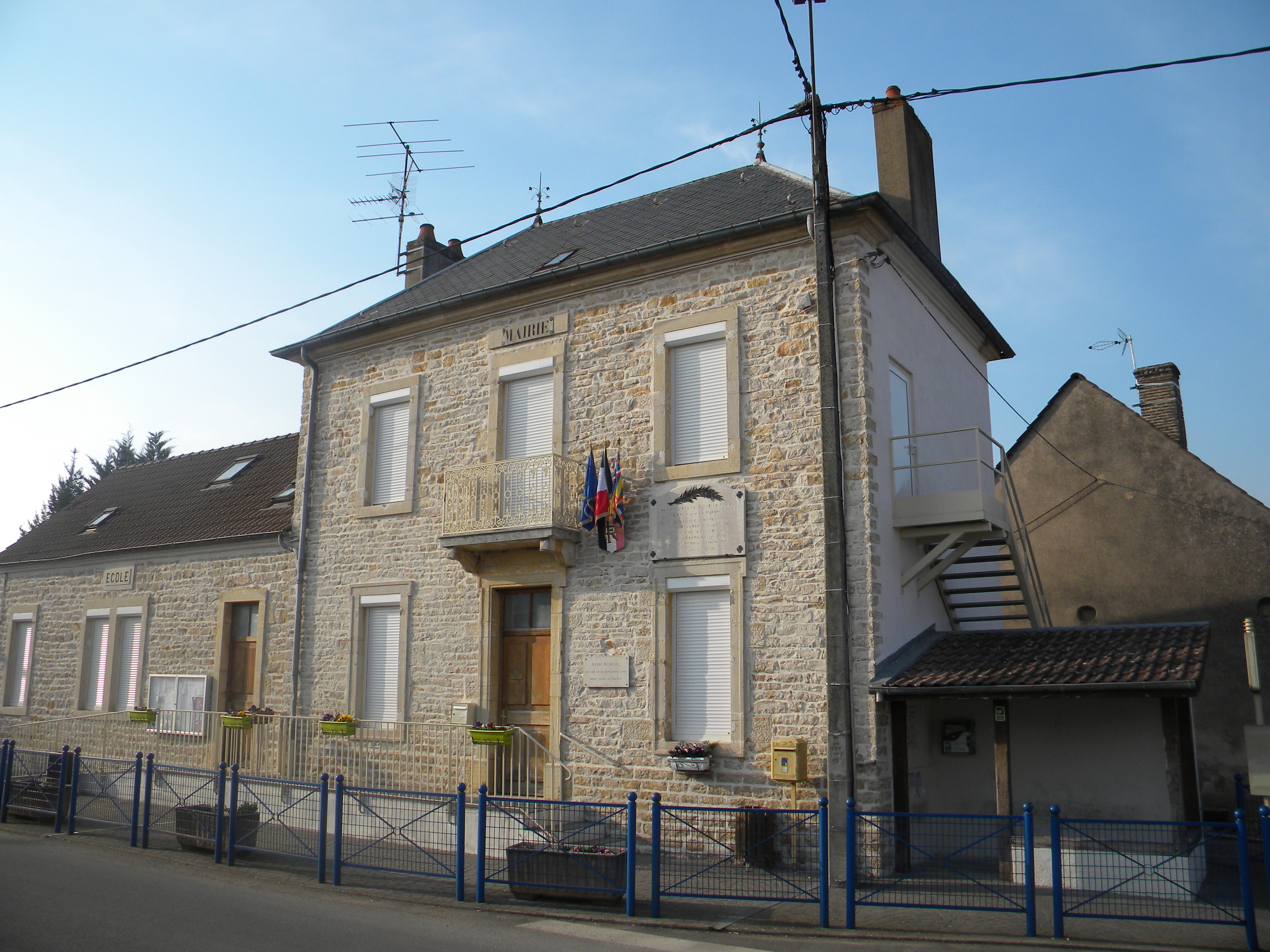
- Town hall

- Coat of arms
- Location of Beire-le-Fort
- Location within France Location within Bourgogne-Franche-Comté
- Coordinates: 47°13′53″N 5°15′20″E
- Country: France
- Region: Bourgogne-Franche-Comté
- Department: Côte-d'Or
- Arrondissement: Dijon
- Canton: Genlis
- Intercommunality: Plaine Dijonnaise

Government
  - Mayor (2020–2026): Marie-Françoise Dupas
- Area^{1}: 5.27 km^{2} (2.03 sq mi)
- Highest elevation: 207 m (679 ft)
- Lowest elevation: 194 m (636 ft)
- Population (2023): 339
  - Density: 64.3/km^{2} (167/sq mi)
- Time zone: UTC+01:00 (CET)
  - Summer (DST): UTC+02:00 (CEST)
- INSEE/Postal code: 21057 /21110
- ^{1} French Land Register data, which excludes lakes, ponds, glaciers > 1 km^{2} (0.386 sq mi or 247 acres) and river estuaries.

Beire-le-Fort (French pronunciation: [bɛʁ lə fɔʁ]) is a commune in the Côte-d'Or department in eastern France.

== Population ==
Historical population
Year	Pop.	±% p.a.
1968	163	—
1975	158	−0.44%
1982	172	+1.22%
1990	164	−0.59%
1999	251	+4.84%
2007	286	+1.65%
2012	314	+1.89%
2017	346	+1.96%
2023	339	−0.34%
Source: INSEE

== See also ==
- Communes of the Côte-d'Or department
