= Izier =

- Commune
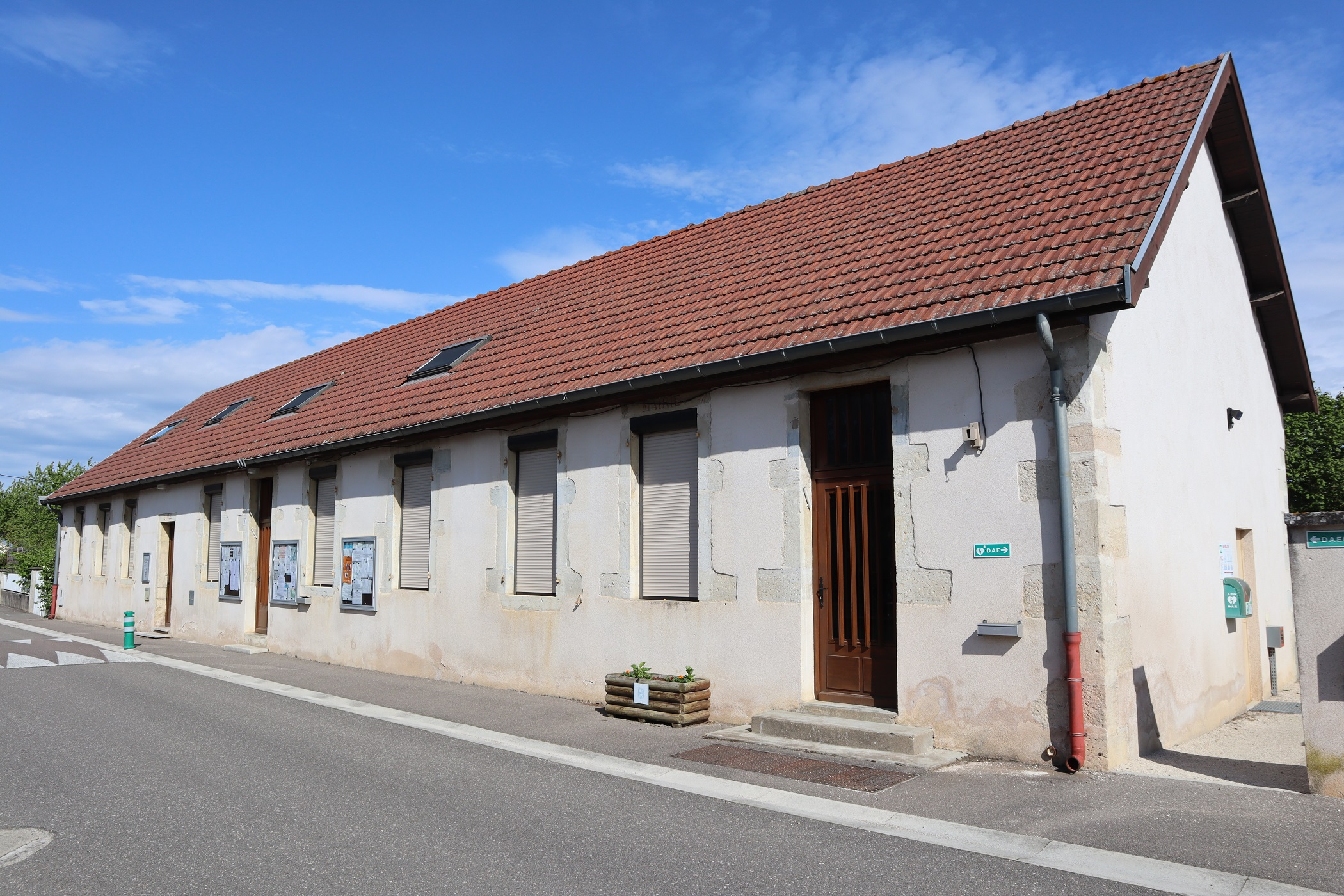
- Town hall

- Coat of arms
- Location of Izier
- Location within France Location within Bourgogne-Franche-Comté
- Coordinates: 47°16′57″N 5°11′30″E
- Country: France
- Region: Bourgogne-Franche-Comté
- Department: Côte-d'Or
- Arrondissement: Dijon
- Canton: Genlis
- Intercommunality: Plaine Dijonnaise

Government
  - Mayor (2020–2026): Patrice Espinosa
- Area^{1}: 7.48 km^{2} (2.89 sq mi)
- Highest elevation: 210 m (690 ft)
- Lowest elevation: 201 m (659 ft)
- Population (2023): 783
  - Density: 105/km^{2} (271/sq mi)
- Time zone: UTC+01:00 (CET)
  - Summer (DST): UTC+02:00 (CEST)
- INSEE/Postal code: 21320 /21110
- ^{1} French Land Register data, which excludes lakes, ponds, glaciers > 1 km^{2} (0.386 sq mi or 247 acres) and river estuaries.

Izier (French pronunciation: [izje]) is a commune in the Côte-d'Or department in eastern France.

== Population ==
Historical population
Year	Pop.	±% p.a.
1968	188	—
1975	312	+7.50%
1982	352	+1.74%
1990	574	+6.30%
1999	641	+1.23%
2007	666	+0.48%
2012	805	+3.86%
2017	794	−0.27%
2023	783	−0.23%
Source: INSEE

== Heraldry ==
Technical description of the coat of arms (Blasonnement): "On a blue background, there are two golden lances arranged to look like Saint Andrew's cross and a golden mallet over everything."

== See also ==
- Communes of the Côte-d'Or department
