= Varanges =

- Commune
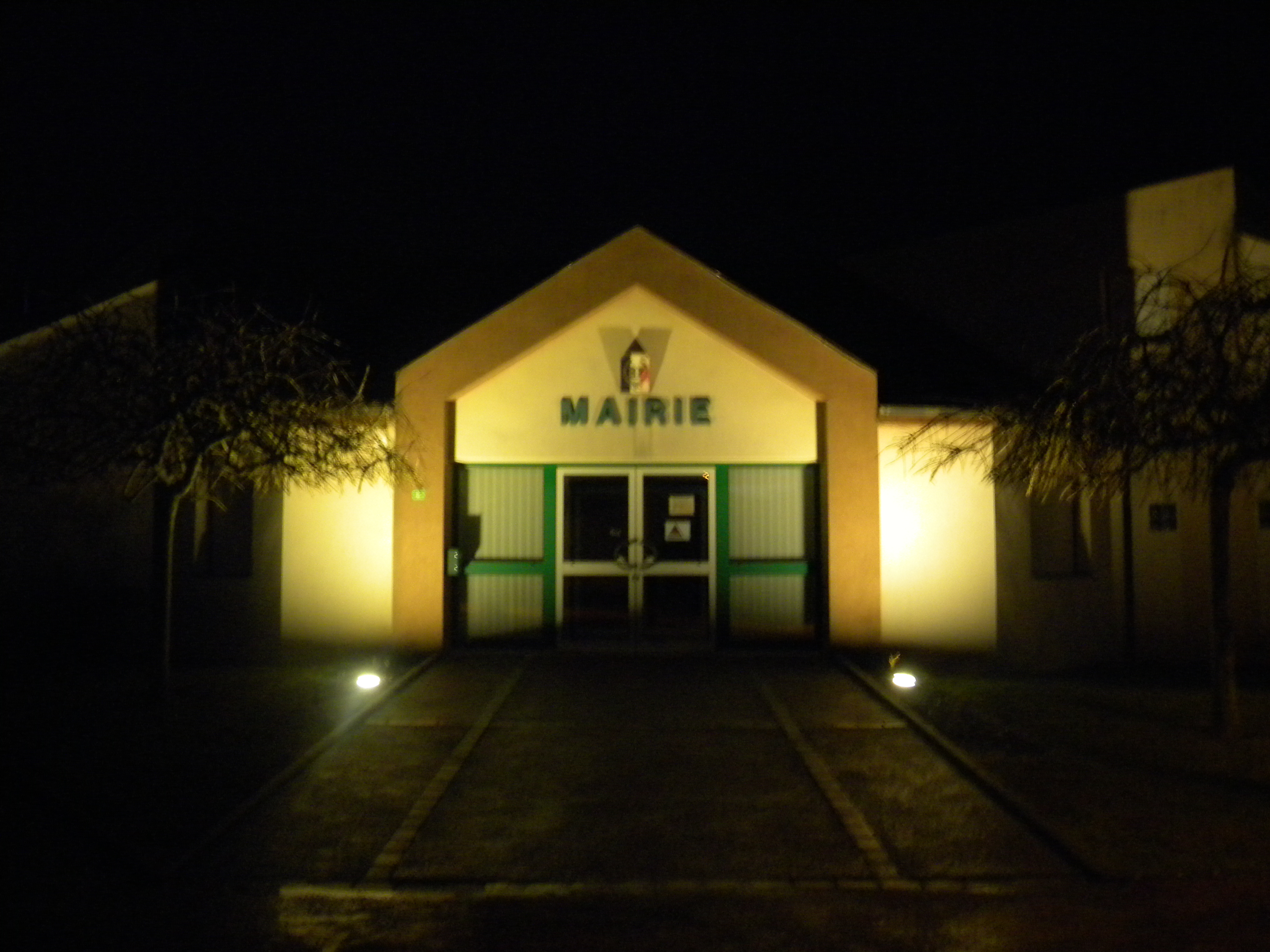
- Town hall

- Coat of arms
- Location of Varanges
- Location within France Location within Bourgogne-Franche-Comté
- Coordinates: 47°13′52″N 5°11′38″E
- Country: France
- Region: Bourgogne-Franche-Comté
- Department: Côte-d'Or
- Arrondissement: Dijon
- Canton: Genlis
- Intercommunality: Plaine Dijonnaise

Government
  - Mayor (2020–2026): Simon Gevrey
- Area^{1}: 9.37 km^{2} (3.62 sq mi)
- Highest elevation: 222 m (728 ft)
- Lowest elevation: 196 m (643 ft)
- Population (2023): 678
  - Density: 72.4/km^{2} (187/sq mi)
- Time zone: UTC+01:00 (CET)
  - Summer (DST): UTC+02:00 (CEST)
- INSEE/Postal code: 21656 /21110
- ^{1} French Land Register data, which excludes lakes, ponds, glaciers > 1 km^{2} (0.386 sq mi or 247 acres) and river estuaries.

Varanges (French pronunciation: [vaʁɑ̃ʒ]) is a commune in the Côte-d'Or department in eastern France.

== Population ==
Historical population
Year	Pop.	±% p.a.
1968	384	—
1975	447	+2.19%
1982	568	+3.48%
1990	572	+0.09%
1999	662	+1.64%
2007	813	+2.60%
2012	762	−1.29%
2017	716	−1.24%
2023	678	−0.90%
Source: INSEE

== See also ==
- Communes of the Côte-d'Or department
