= Arc-sur-Tille =

- Commune
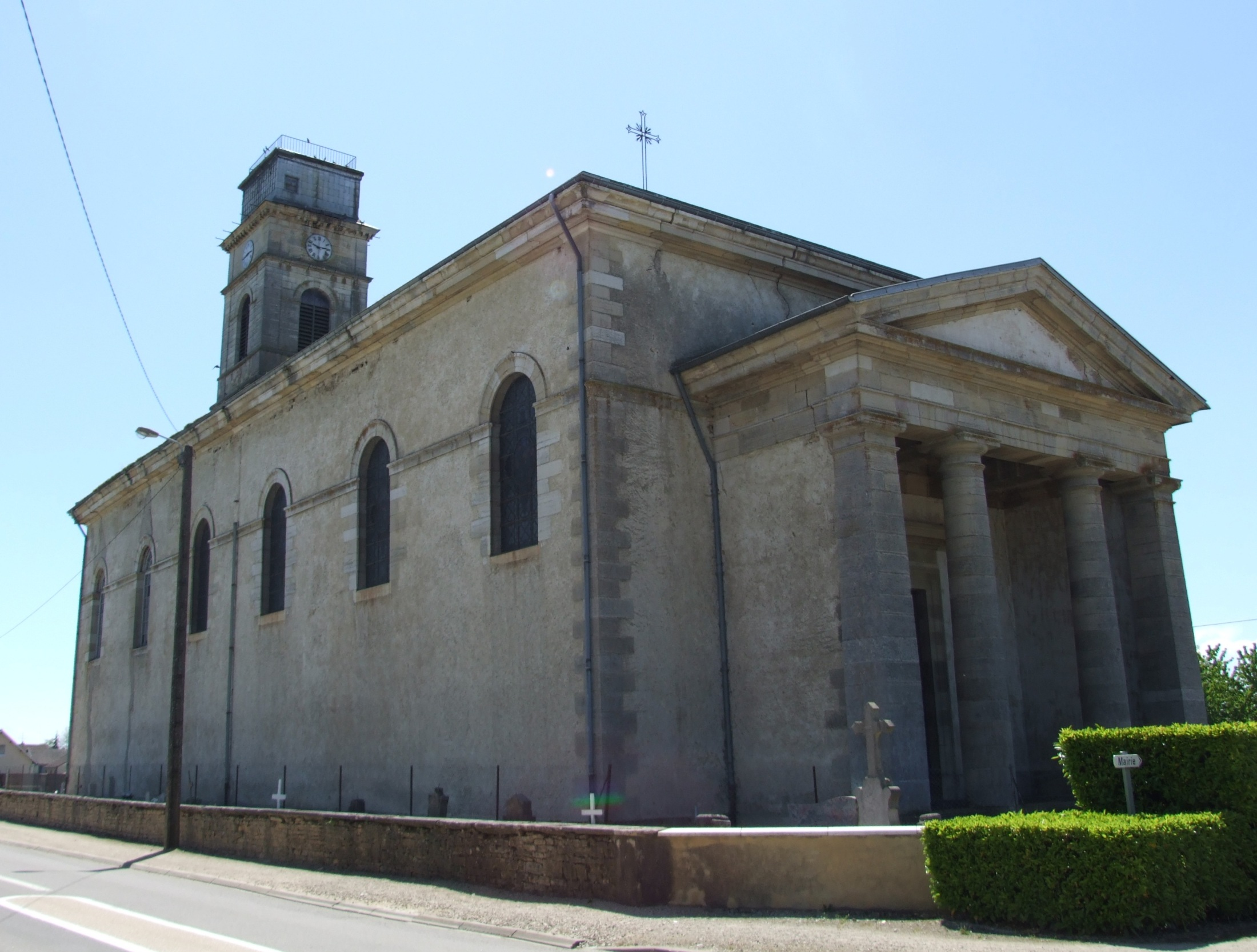
- The Church of Saint Martin

- Coat of arms
- Location of Arc-sur-Tille
- Location within France Location within Bourgogne-Franche-Comté
- Coordinates: 47°20′38″N 5°11′33″E
- Country: France
- Region: Bourgogne-Franche-Comté
- Department: Côte-d'Or
- Arrondissement: Dijon
- Canton: Saint-Apollinaire
- Intercommunality: Norge et Tille

Government
  - Mayor (2020–2026): Patrick Morelière
- Area^{1}: 22.71 km^{2} (8.77 sq mi)
- Highest elevation: 241 m (791 ft)
- Lowest elevation: 209 m (686 ft)
- Population (2023): 2,584
  - Density: 113.8/km^{2} (294.7/sq mi)
- Time zone: UTC+01:00 (CET)
  - Summer (DST): UTC+02:00 (CEST)
- INSEE/Postal code: 21021 /21560
- ^{1} French Land Register data, which excludes lakes, ponds, glaciers > 1 km^{2} (0.386 sq mi or 247 acres) and river estuaries.

Arc-sur-Tille (French pronunciation: [aʁk syʁ tij], literally Arc on Tille) is a commune in the Côte-d'Or department in the Bourgogne-Franche-Comté region of eastern France.

== Geography ==
Arc-sur-Tille is located approximately 12 kilometres by road east of Dijon by road D70 which continues north-west to Magny-Saint-Medard. The A31 autoroute passes through the west of the commune from north to south with exit 4 in the commune west of the town. The commune can also be accessed from Remilly-sur-Tille in the south by road D34 which continues north to Chateau d'Arcelot. Road D961 also goes east from the village to Étevaux. Apart from the large sized village occupying some 15% of the commune, the rest of the area is almost entirely farmland.

=== Geology ===
The commune is located on a marshy plain

=== Hydrography ===
The commune is traversed from north to south by the Tille, a tributary of the Saône. It has often flooded in the past, overwhelming and damaging the village and crops.

The Lake of Arc-sur-Tille, west of the town, is a former gravel pit converted since 2002 to create the largest sandy beach in Burgundy. It is very popular in summer with swimmers and it allows many water activities (sailing, canoeing, water skiing and fishing basins reserved). The lake water is of excellent quality.

== History ==
The Arc-sur-Tille Parish in the 17th century had its name corrupted by the vulgar pronunciation Astille. The village was a bailiwick, revenue office, and storehouse for salt from Dijon. Depends on both the Bishop of Chalon-sur-Saône and the Archdeacon of Oscheret. Three-quarters of the tithe was for the lord and the rest for the priest. It was 11, 12, or 13 bundles of all kinds of grain.

The patron saint of the parish was Saint Martin, Archbishop of Tours, whose principal feast is not on 11 November, the day of his death, but on 4 July, the day of the Translation of his relics; the dedication of the church is celebrated the Sunday before 3 August.

Abbots from the Abbey of Saint-Étienne of Dijon have the right to preach at this church, from Gautier, Bishop of Chalon-sur-Saône who gave this right to them in 1117. Jotsalde or Joussaud, his successor in the bishopric, ratified this in the same year in a full synod of Tournus and it was subsequently confirmed by various popes in 1124, by Callistus II in 1139, by Innocent II, then in 1156, 1185, 1238, 1245 and 1290. This land with full justice rights was raised to a marquisate. The only trade was in coal. It grew wheat, barley, oats and conceau in vineyards and meadows that yielded a very bad hay. The 138 inhabitants were very poor except for three or four. In 1260 Henry de Vergy declared tenure in fief with allegiance to the Duke of Burgundy the fiefs of Bere, Arc-sur-Tille, and Janle. The village was given the name of a local family. Maifroi of Archo gave the enclosed land within the lordship of Arc to the abbot of Saint-Étienne and also gave him the right of heating from the wood in 1115.

It was in the 14th century that the last heir of the lordship, Jehanne d'Arc, took as her husband Eudes de Saulx and thus the land entered the House of Saulx-Tavannes where it still was in the 18th century. The levy cost the States the sum of 45,000 livres in 1614. Before the French Revolution there were four fairs a year: on 4 January, March, May, and September. In 1636 Arc was burned by Matthias Gallas and the castle was plundered and destroyed.

On 9 February 1650 near Arc there was a battle between the troops of the King, led by the Marquis de Tavannes and the Count, his nephew, who commanded those of the Prince of Conde, then a prisoner at Le Havre. The King was defeated and lost all his equipment.

=== Heraldry ===
Arms of Arc-sur-Tille	Blazon: Bendy of Six Or and Gules.

== Administration ==
Mayors under the Ancien Régime

- 1115 av - Maifroi de Archo
- 1314 - Jeahan d'Arc Knight, Squire of Arc
- 1329 - Jehan d'Arc Knight, Squire of Arc
- 1331 - Guy d'Arc and his wife Alix de Nus
- 1380 - Humbert d'Arc, Knight of Arc
- 14th century- Jehanne d'Arc husband, Eudes de Saulx
- 1543 - Elyon de Mailly, Lord of Arc, Charette-Varennes, and Terrans
- 1650 - Marquis de Tavannes
- 1666 - Jacques de Saulx, Count of Tavanne, bailiff of Dijon

List of Successive Mayors

From	To	Name	Party
2001	2008	François Mauge	ind.
2008	2008	Daniel Viard	ind.
2008	2026	Patrick Morelière	ind.

== Demography ==
The inhabitants of the commune are known as Acétillois or Acétilloises in French.

Historical population

Year	Pop.	±% p.a.
1793	1,031	—
1800	1,018	−0.18%
1806	1,043	+0.41%
1821	1,045	+0.01%
1831	1,081	+0.34%
1836	1,044	−0.69%
1841	1,086	+0.79%
1846	1,109	+0.42%
1851	1,178	+1.21%
1856	1,181	+0.05%
1861	1,147	−0.58%
1866	1,012	−2.47%
1872	1,010	−0.03%
1876	973	−0.93%
1881	948	−0.52%
1886	1,003	+1.13%
1891	938	−1.33%
1896	858	−1.77%
1901	816	−1.00%

Year	Pop.	±% p.a.
1906	781	−0.87%
1911	803	+0.56%
1921	678	−1.68%
1926	662	−0.48%
1931	698	+1.06%
1936	711	+0.37%
1946	738	+0.37%
1954	812	+1.20%
1962	800	−0.19%
1968	842	+0.86%
1975	940	+1.59%
1982	1,913	+10.68%
1990	1,950	+0.24%
1999	2,332	+2.01%
2007	2,456	+0.65%
2012	2,483	+0.22%
2017	2,670	+1.46%
2023	2,584	−0.54%

Source: EHESS and INSEE

== Sites and monuments ==
=== Civil heritage ===
- The Château d'Arc-sur-Tille was looted and destroyed in 1636 by Galas
- The Moulin sur la Tille (Mill on the Tille)
- The Town Hall contains a Federation Banner (1790) which is registered as an historical object.

=== Religious heritage ===
The Church of Saint Martin was built during the French Restoration (1820-1830) in the Neo-classical style. In 1989 the building was in such a state of disrepair that it had to close. The former municipality, despite opposition from religious authorities, had planned to demolish the building but due to the action of the UEPA association, the first installment of rehabilitation work was launched in April 2013. A national subscription was raised through the Heritage Foundation to enable the financing of the second phase of work that will eventually reopen the Church of Saint Martin to the public. The church contains several items that are registered as historical objects:

- A Painting: Saint Antoine the Hermit (16th century)
- A Painting: Ecce homo (17th century)
- A Painting: Saint Nicolas (18th century)
- A Statue: Saint Ursula (18th century)
- A Tombstone for Louis de Lenoncourt (16th century)
- The Furniture in the Church

== Notable people linked to the commune ==
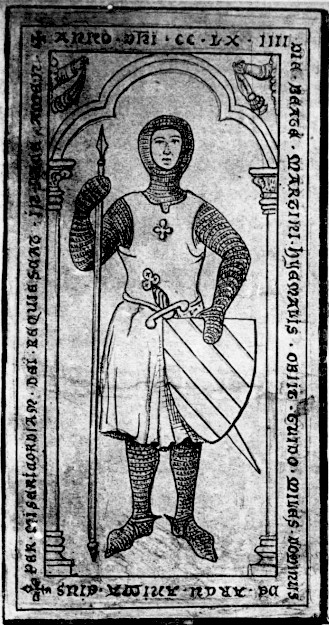
The tomb of Gui of Arc-sur-Tille

- Henri d'Arc, dean of the Sainte-Chapelle of Dijon, died in 1238; he was the nephew of Hugues d'Arc, abbot of St. Benignus.
- Hugues d'Arc, Abbot of the Abbey of La Chaise-Dieu in 1306
- Hugues d'Arc, 73rd Abbot of the Abbey of Saint-Benign of Dijon from 1269 to 1300
- Jehan d'Arc, two Knights, Lords of Arc in 1314 & 1329, their epitaphs are in the parish church.
- Louis XIV, King of France, stayed in Arc-sur-Tille on 19 June 1674 after the conquest of Franche-Comté.
- Nicolas Jacquemard (1771-1835), general of the armies of the Republic and the Empire.
- Stéphane Tarnier (1828-1897), French obstetrician, inventor of several obstetric instruments, including Tarnier forceps. He recommended to his disciples at the time to implement aseptic practices during childbirth recommended by Semmelweis and Lister. The majority of these works in obstetrics are grouped in a book entitled Treatise of the Art of Childbirth by Prof. S Tarnier and Prof. P Budin. In the main street of Arc-sur-Tille his former residence (La Clochette) bears his name. To the south of Arc-sur-Tille a fountain also bears his name.
- Albin Roussin (1781-1854), Baron Albin Reine Roussin, born at Dijon; Admiral, Savant, Minister of the Navy.

== See also ==
- Communes of the Côte-d'Or department

=== Bibliography ===
- Claude Courtépée, Historical Description of the Duchy of Burgundy ..., Dijon, chez Causse imprimeur, Vol. II, p. 312-314. (in French)
