= Ramparts of Aigues-Mortes =

Medieval fortifications in southern France

Coordinates: 43.5685°N 4.1898°E

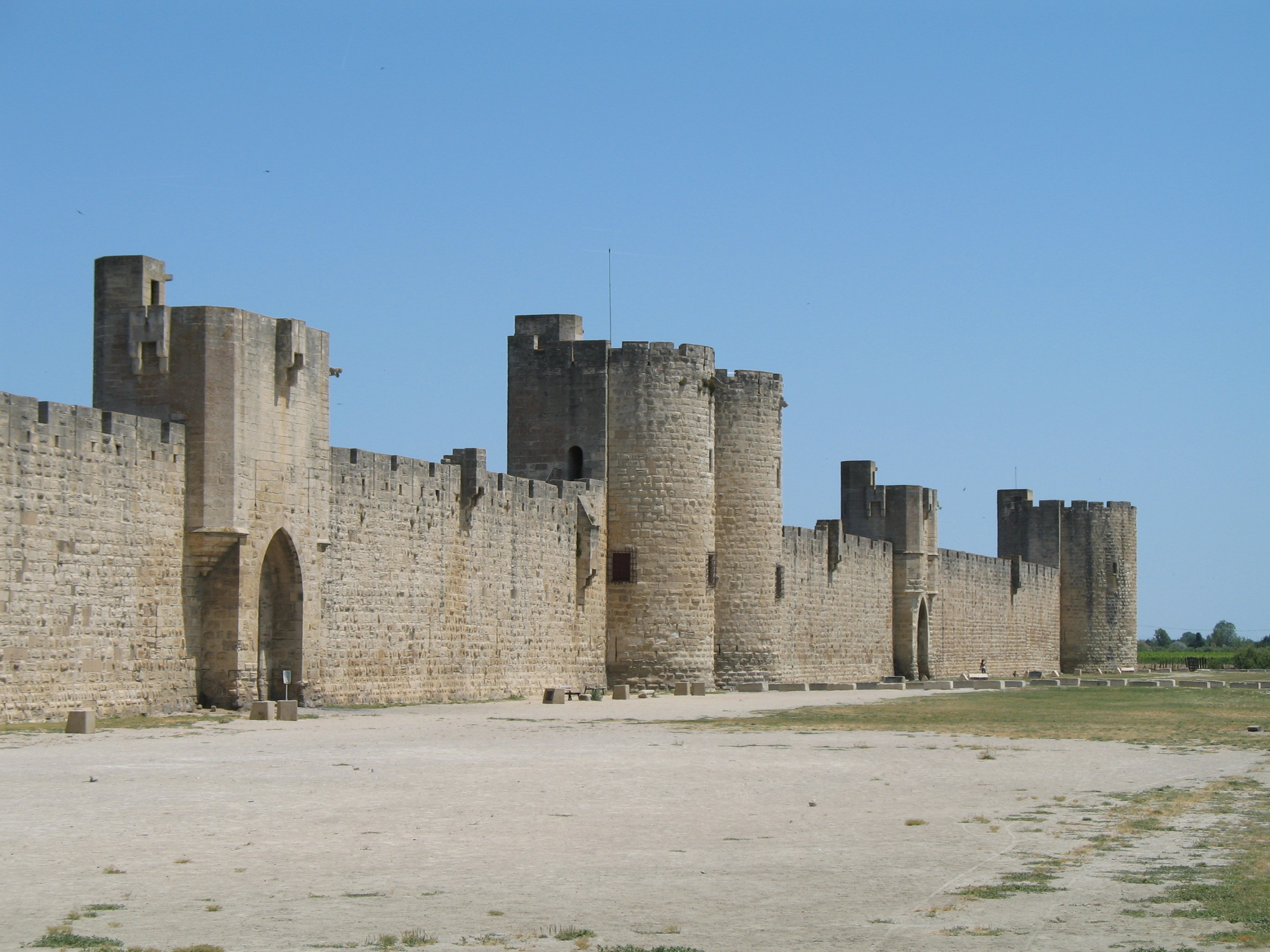

The ramparts of Aigues-Mortes are the 13th-century fortifications of the town Aigues-Mortes, in Gard, France. It is a listed historical monument since 1903.
