= Villiers-les-Hauts =

French commune in the Yonne department

- Commune
- Location of Villiers-les-Hauts
- Location within France Location within Bourgogne-Franche-Comté
- Coordinates: 47°43′38″N 4°08′57″E
- Country: France
- Region: Bourgogne-Franche-Comté
- Department: Yonne
- Arrondissement: Avallon
- Canton: Tonnerrois

Government
  - Mayor (2020–2026): Jacques Bercier
- Area^{1}: 19.12 km^{2} (7.38 sq mi)
- Highest elevation: 306 m (1,004 ft)
- Lowest elevation: 177 m (581 ft)
- Population (2023): 124
  - Density: 6.49/km^{2} (16.8/sq mi)
- Time zone: UTC+01:00 (CET)
  - Summer (DST): UTC+02:00 (CEST)
- INSEE/Postal code: 89470 /89160
- ^{1} French Land Register data, which excludes lakes, ponds, glaciers > 1 km^{2} (0.386 sq mi or 247 acres) and river estuaries.

Villiers-les-Hauts (French pronunciation: [vilje le o]) is a commune in the Yonne department in Bourgogne-Franche-Comté in north-central France.

== See also ==
- Communes of the Yonne department
