= Lux, Côte-d'Or =

Lux
- Commune
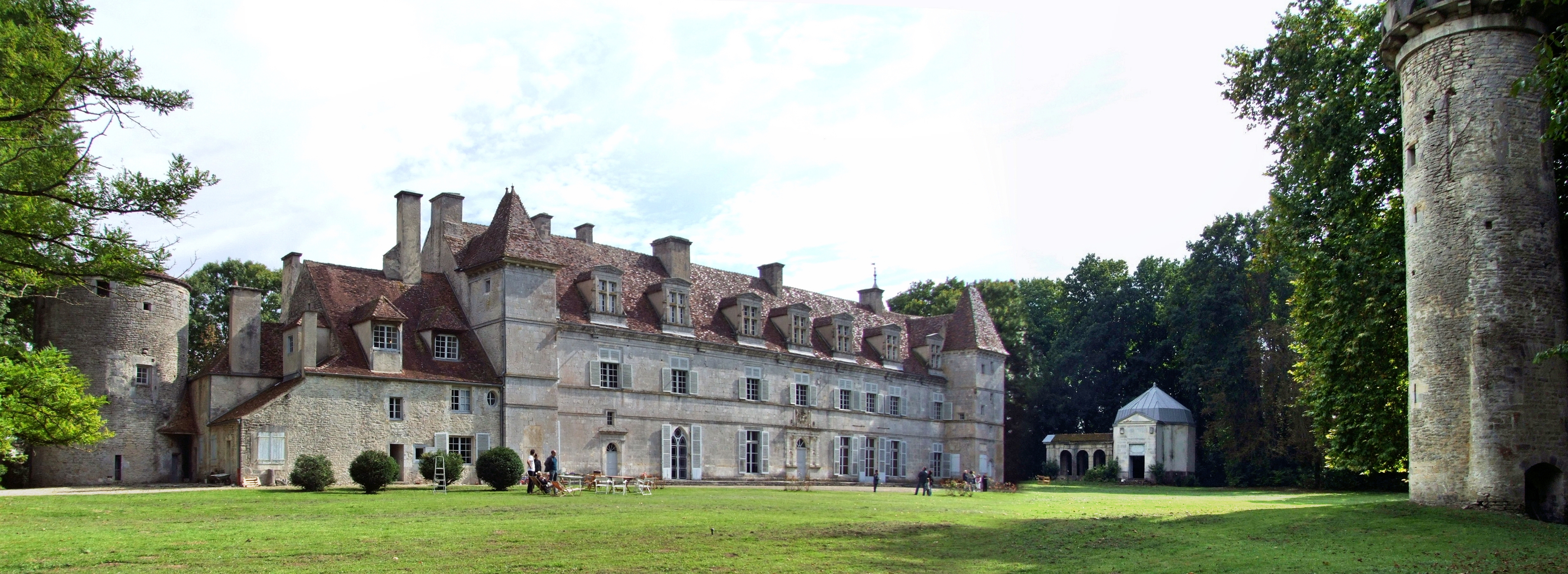
- Chateau
- Location of Lux
- Location within France Location within Bourgogne-Franche-Comté
- Coordinates: 47°29′30″N 5°12′46″E
- Country: France
- Region: Bourgogne-Franche-Comté
- Department: Côte-d'Or
- Arrondissement: Dijon
- Canton: Is-sur-Tille

Government
  - Mayor (2020–2026): Renaud Lehmann
- Area^{1}: 23.1 km^{2} (8.9 sq mi)
- Elevation: 254 m (833 ft)
- Highest elevation: 305 m (1,001 ft)
- Lowest elevation: 244 m (801 ft)
- Population (2023): 517
  - Density: 22.4/km^{2} (58.0/sq mi)
- Time zone: UTC+01:00 (CET)
  - Summer (DST): UTC+02:00 (CEST)
- INSEE/Postal code: 21361 /21120
- ^{1} French Land Register data, which excludes lakes, ponds, glaciers > 1 km^{2} (0.386 sq mi or 247 acres) and river estuaries.

Lux (French pronunciation: [lyks]) is a commune in the Côte-d'Or department in eastern France.

== Population ==
Historical population
| Year | Pop. | ±% p.a. |
|---|---|---|
| 1968 | 389 | — |
| 1975 | 415 | +0.93% |
| 1982 | 435 | +0.67% |
| 1990 | 468 | +0.92% |
| 1999 | 502 | +0.78% |
| 2007 | 515 | +0.32% |
| 2012 | 521 | +0.23% |
| 2017 | 524 | +0.11% |
| 2023 | 517 | −0.22% |
Source: INSEE

== See also ==
- Communes of the Côte-d'Or department
