= Longeault =

Commune in Côte-d'Or, France

- Part of Longeault-Pluvault
- Coat of arms
- Location of Longeault
- Location within France Location within Bourgogne-Franche-Comté
- Coordinates: 47°13′21″N 5°15′17″E
- Country: France
- Region: Bourgogne-Franche-Comté
- Department: Côte-d'Or
- Arrondissement: Dijon
- Canton: Genlis
- Commune: Longeault-Pluvault
- Area^{1}: 1.24 km^{2} (0.48 sq mi)
- Highest elevation: 198 m (650 ft)
- Lowest elevation: 193 m (633 ft)
- Population (2023): 556
  - Density: 448/km^{2} (1,160/sq mi)
- Time zone: UTC+01:00 (CET)
  - Summer (DST): UTC+02:00 (CEST)
- Postal code: 21110
- ^{1} French Land Register data, which excludes lakes, ponds, glaciers > 1 km^{2} (0.386 sq mi or 247 acres) and river estuaries.

Longeault (French pronunciation: [lɔ̃ʒo]) is a former commune in the Côte-d'Or department in eastern France. On 1 January 2019, it was merged into the new commune Longeault-Pluvault.

== See also ==
- Communes of the Côte-d'Or department
