= Marcilly-et-Dracy =

- Commune
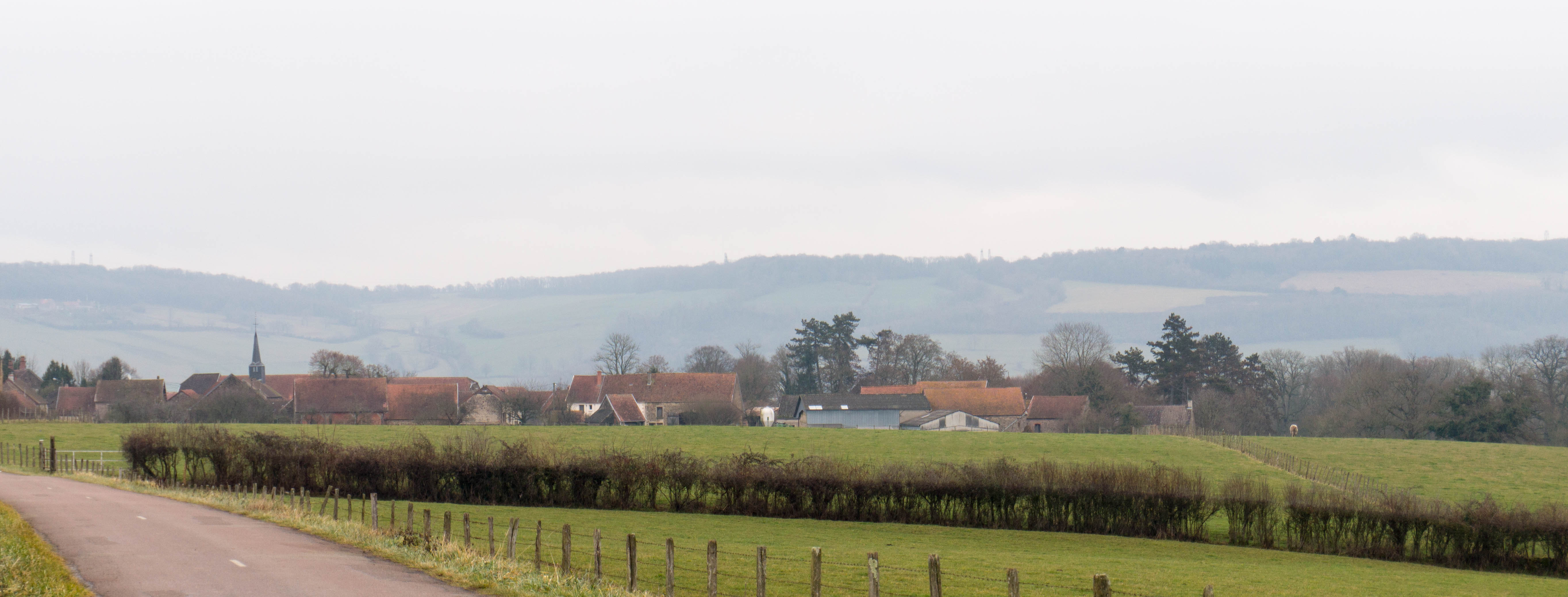
- A general view of Dracy
- Location of Marcilly-et-Dracy
- Location within France Location within Bourgogne-Franche-Comté
- Coordinates: 47°24′10″N 4°30′02″E
- Country: France
- Region: Bourgogne-Franche-Comté
- Department: Côte-d'Or
- Arrondissement: Montbard
- Canton: Semur-en-Auxois

Government
  - Mayor (2020–2026): Michel Cortot
- Area^{1}: 8.65 km^{2} (3.34 sq mi)
- Elevation: 359 m (1,178 ft)
- Highest elevation: 498 m (1,634 ft)
- Lowest elevation: 313 m (1,027 ft)
- Population (2023): 84
  - Density: 9.7/km^{2} (25/sq mi)
- Time zone: UTC+01:00 (CET)
  - Summer (DST): UTC+02:00 (CEST)
- INSEE/Postal code: 21381 /21350
- ^{1} French Land Register data, which excludes lakes, ponds, glaciers > 1 km^{2} (0.386 sq mi or 247 acres) and river estuaries.

Marcilly-et-Dracy (French pronunciation: [maʁsiji e dʁasi]) is a commune in the Côte-d'Or department in eastern France.

== Population ==
Historical population
Year	Pop.	±% p.a.
1968	115	—
1975	99	−2.12%
1982	86	−1.99%
1990	85	−0.15%
1999	95	+1.24%
2007	92	−0.40%
2012	104	+2.48%
2017	99	−0.98%
2023	84	−2.70%
Source: INSEE

== See also ==
- Communes of the Côte-d'Or department
