= Beurizot =

- Commune
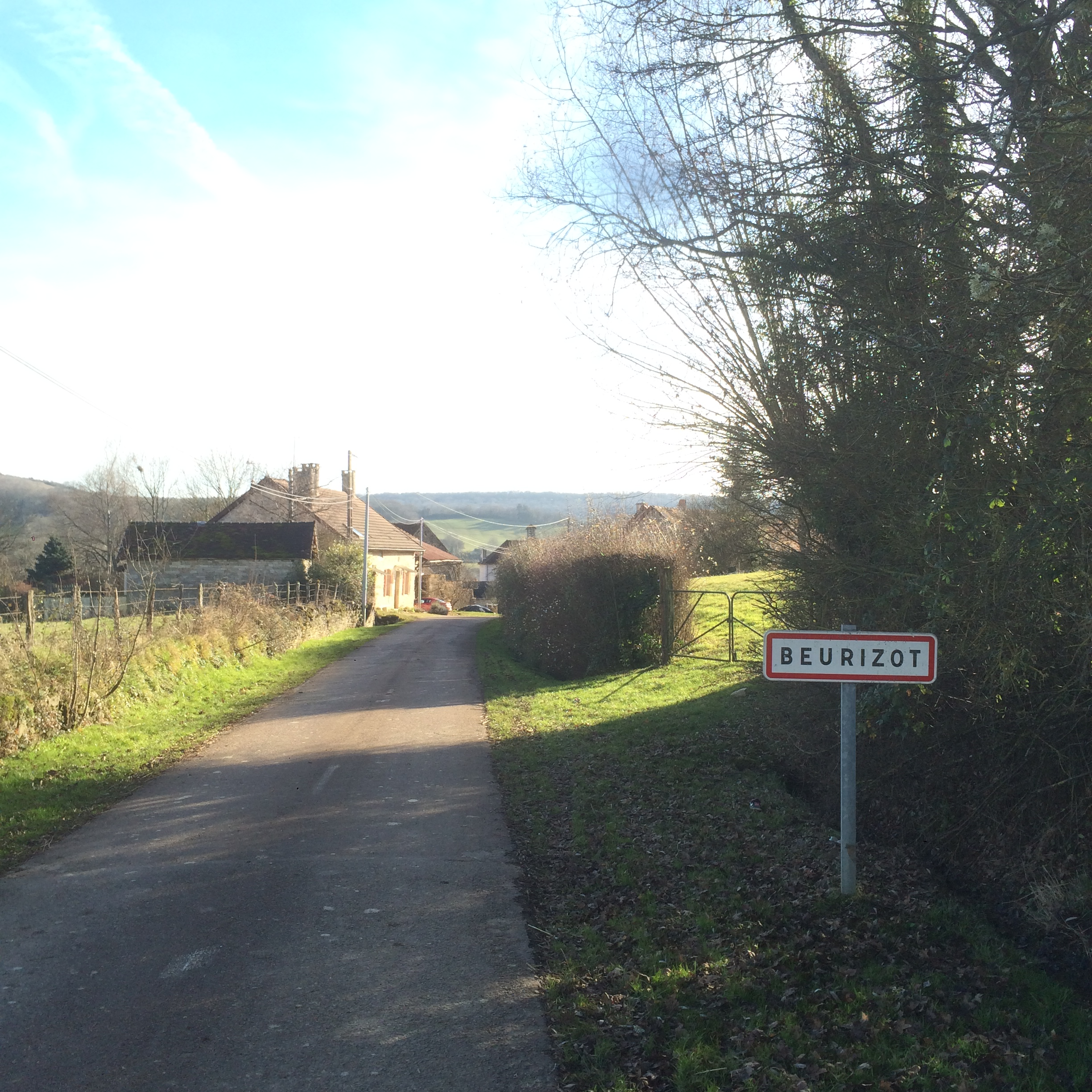
- The road into Beurizot

- Coat of arms
- Location of Beurizot
- Location within France Location within Bourgogne-Franche-Comté
- Coordinates: 47°21′10″N 4°29′43″E
- Country: France
- Region: Bourgogne-Franche-Comté
- Department: Côte-d'Or
- Arrondissement: Montbard
- Canton: Semur-en-Auxois

Government
  - Mayor (2021–2026): Brian Jeannin
- Area^{1}: 14.5 km^{2} (5.6 sq mi)
- Elevation: 352 m (1,155 ft)
- Highest elevation: 513 m (1,683 ft)
- Lowest elevation: 332 m (1,089 ft)
- Population (2023): 107
  - Density: 7.38/km^{2} (19.1/sq mi)
- Time zone: UTC+01:00 (CET)
  - Summer (DST): UTC+02:00 (CEST)
- INSEE/Postal code: 21069 /21350
- ^{1} French Land Register data, which excludes lakes, ponds, glaciers > 1 km^{2} (0.386 sq mi or 247 acres) and river estuaries.

Beurizot (French pronunciation: [bœʁizo]) is a commune in the Côte-d'Or department in eastern France.

== Population ==
Historical population
Year	Pop.	±% p.a.
1968	165	—
1975	112	−5.38%
1982	76	−5.39%
1990	97	+3.10%
1999	110	+1.41%
2007	114	+0.45%
2012	121	+1.20%
2017	121	+0.00%
2023	107	−2.03%
Source: INSEE

== See also ==
- Communes of the Côte-d'Or department
