= Mailly =

- Commune
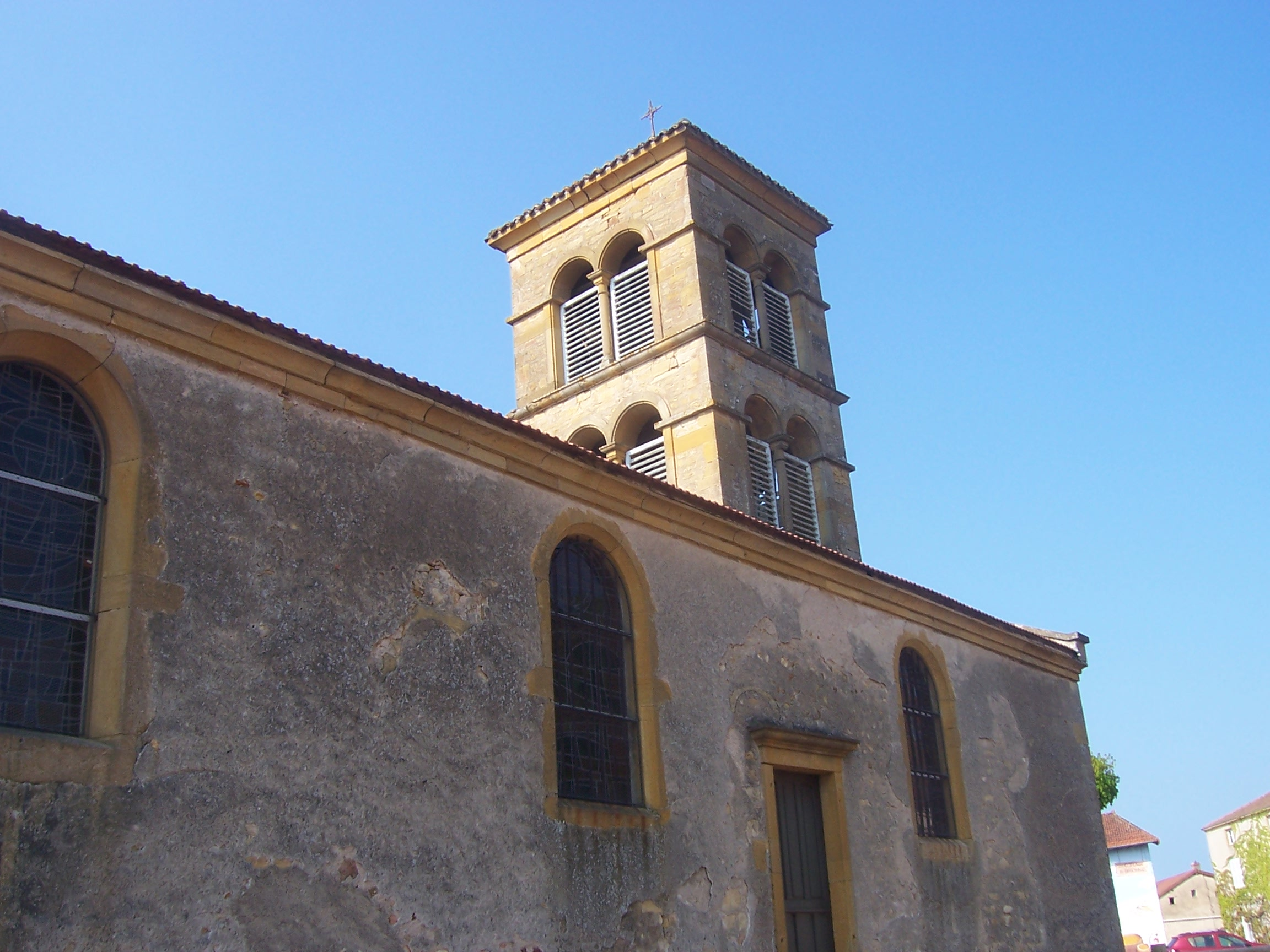
- The church in Mailly
- Location of Mailly
- Location within France Location within Bourgogne-Franche-Comté
- Coordinates: 46°13′23″N 4°06′54″E
- Country: France
- Region: Bourgogne-Franche-Comté
- Department: Saône-et-Loire
- Arrondissement: Charolles
- Canton: Chauffailles
- Area^{1}: 5.47 km^{2} (2.11 sq mi)
- Elevation: 427 m (1,401 ft)
- Highest elevation: 460 m (1,510 ft)
- Lowest elevation: 316 m (1,037 ft)
- Population (2023): 148
  - Density: 27.1/km^{2} (70.1/sq mi)
- Time zone: UTC+01:00 (CET)
  - Summer (DST): UTC+02:00 (CEST)
- INSEE/Postal code: 71271 /71340
- ^{1} French Land Register data, which excludes lakes, ponds, glaciers > 1 km^{2} (0.386 sq mi or 247 acres) and river estuaries.

Mailly (French pronunciation: [maji]) is a picturesque commune in the Saône-et-Loire department in the region of Bourgogne-Franche-Comté in eastern France. Mailly is located in the Brionnais's south. Separated by Caille, the town is spread over three hills, Bourg, Chavannes and Corbey,

== See also ==
- Communes of the Saône-et-Loire department
