= Saulon-la-Chapelle =

- Commune
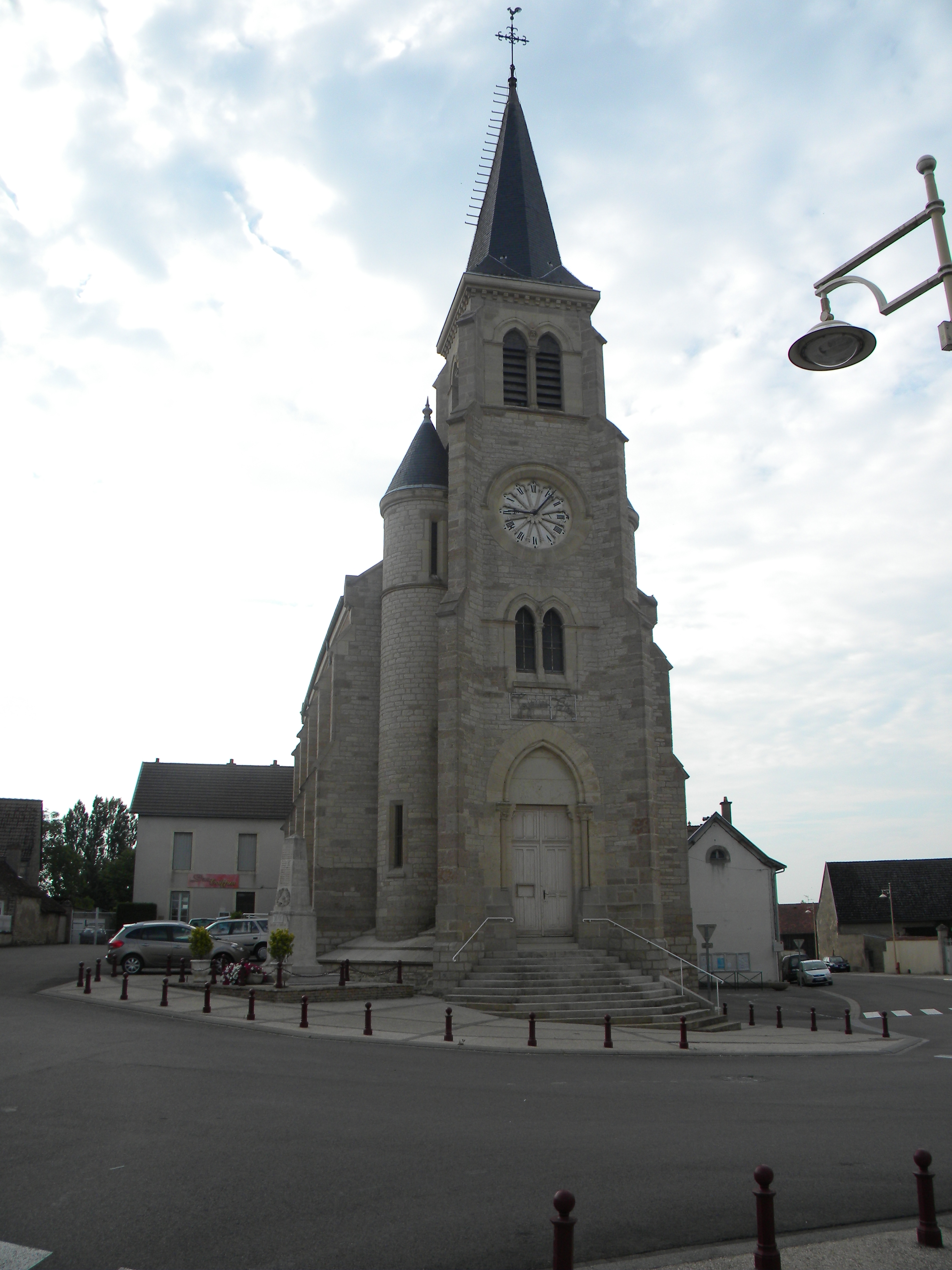
- The church in Saulon-la-Chapelle

- Coat of arms
- Location of Saulon-la-Chapelle
- Location within France Location within Bourgogne-Franche-Comté
- Coordinates: 47°12′56″N 5°05′22″E
- Country: France
- Region: Bourgogne-Franche-Comté
- Department: Côte-d'Or
- Arrondissement: Beaune
- Canton: Nuits-Saint-Georges

Government
  - Mayor (2020–2026): Pascal Bortot
- Area^{1}: 9.99 km^{2} (3.86 sq mi)
- Highest elevation: 226 m (741 ft)
- Lowest elevation: 197 m (646 ft)
- Population (2023): 1,031
  - Density: 103/km^{2} (267/sq mi)
- Time zone: UTC+01:00 (CET)
  - Summer (DST): UTC+02:00 (CEST)
- INSEE/Postal code: 21585 /21910
- ^{1} French Land Register data, which excludes lakes, ponds, glaciers > 1 km^{2} (0.386 sq mi or 247 acres) and river estuaries.

Saulon-la-Chapelle (French pronunciation: [solɔ̃ la ʃapɛl]) is a commune in the Côte-d'Or department in eastern France.

== Population ==
Historical population
Year	Pop.	±% p.a.
1968	865	—
1975	1,000	+2.09%
1982	868	−2.00%
1990	810	−0.86%
1999	927	+1.51%
2007	1,048	+1.55%
2012	1,041	−0.13%
2017	968	−1.44%
2023	1,031	+1.06%
Source: INSEE

== See also ==
- Communes of the Côte-d'Or department
