= Tille (river) =

River in France

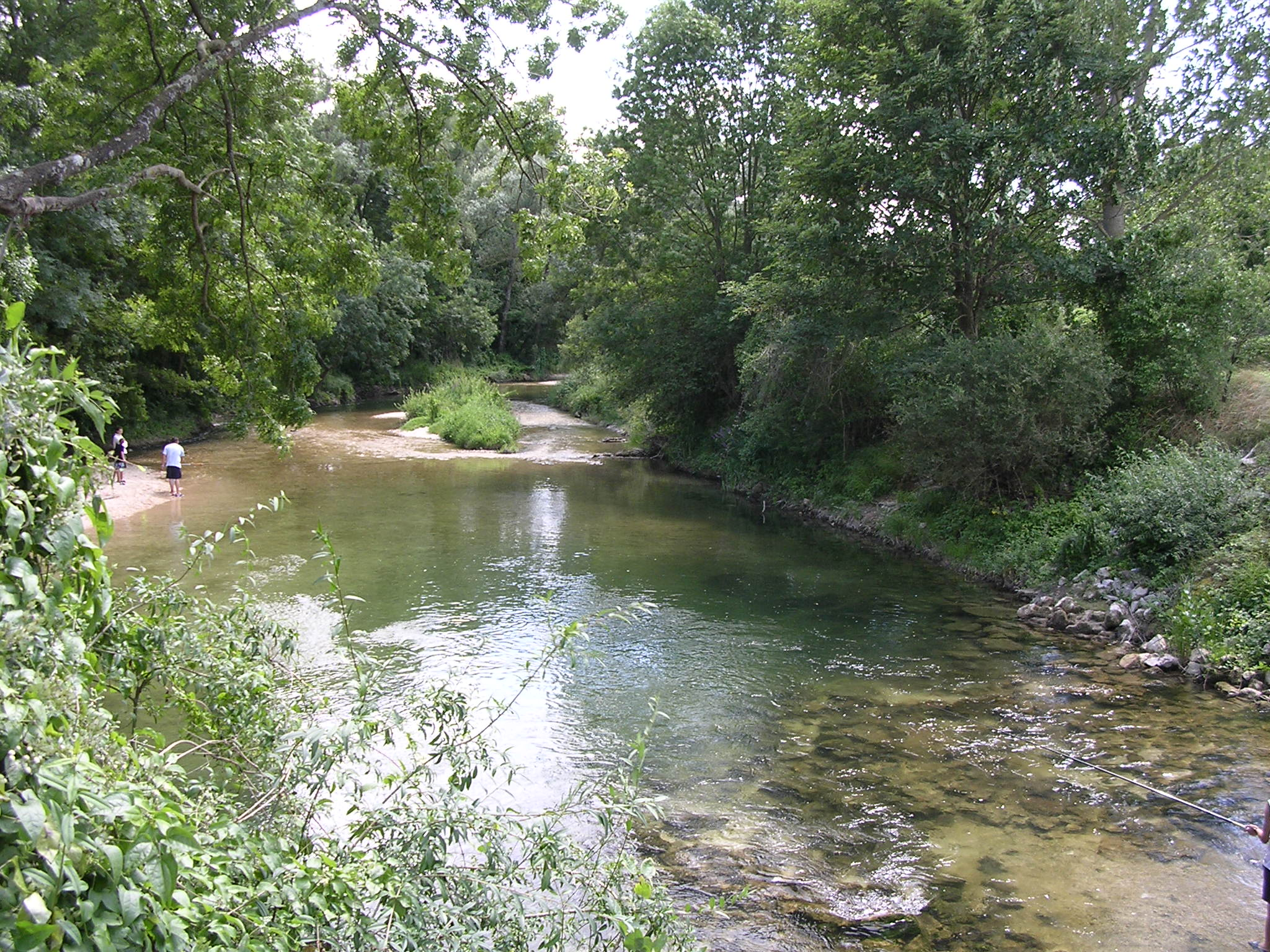

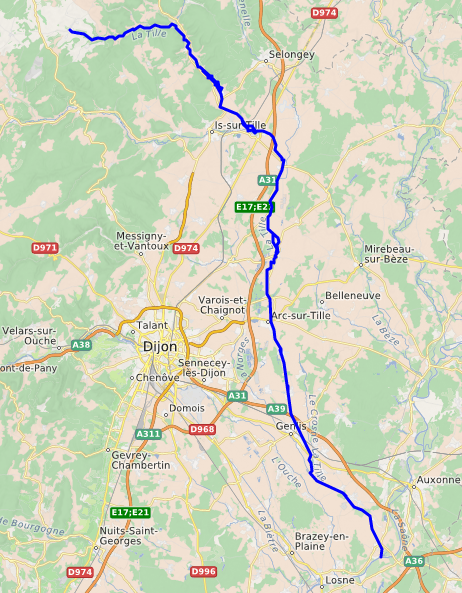

Location
- Country: France

Physical characteristics
- Mouth
  - location: Saône
  - coordinates: 47°7′35″N 5°20′45″E
- Length: 83 km (52 mi)

Basin features
- Progression: Saône→ Rhône→ Mediterranean Sea

The Tille (French pronunciation: [tij]) is an 83-kilometre-long (52 mi) river of eastern France (département Côte-d'Or), a right tributary of the Saône. It is formed by the confluence of three small streams near Cussey-les-Forges, on the Plateau of Langres. The Tille flows south through the following towns: Til-Châtel, Arc-sur-Tille (east of Dijon) and Genlis. The Tille flows into the Saône in Les Maillys, 8 kilometres (5 mi) south of Auxonne.

In 2022, the river dried up following severe drought conditions.
