= Lès =

Archaic French preposition

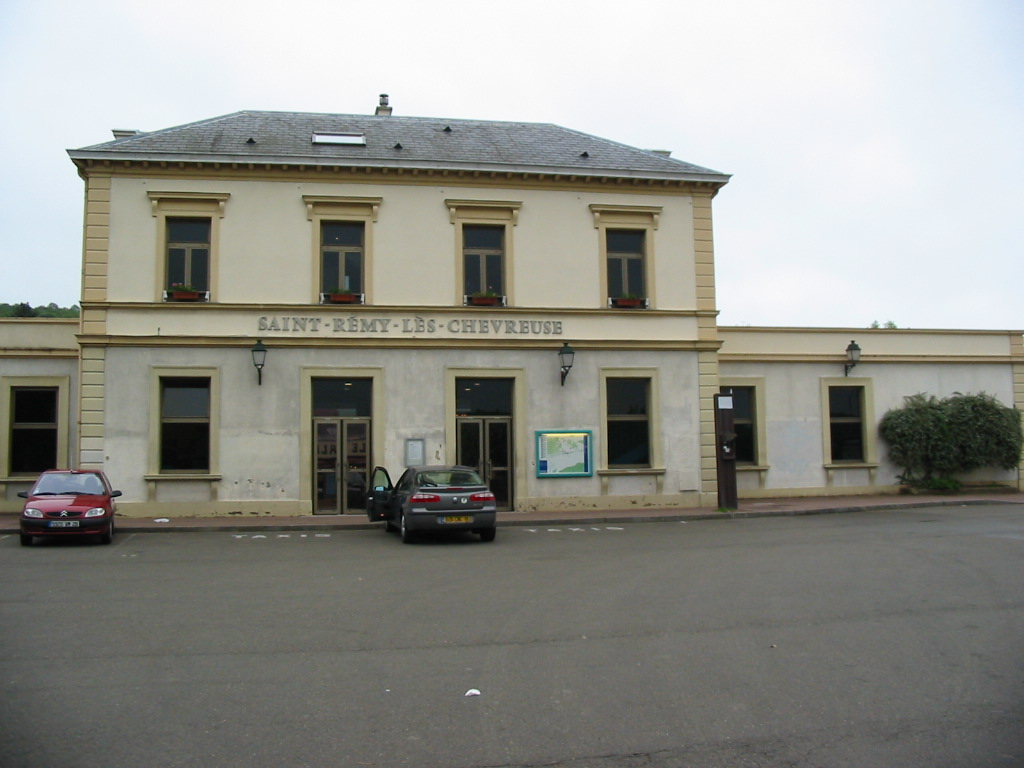
Saint-Rémy-lès-Chevreuse station

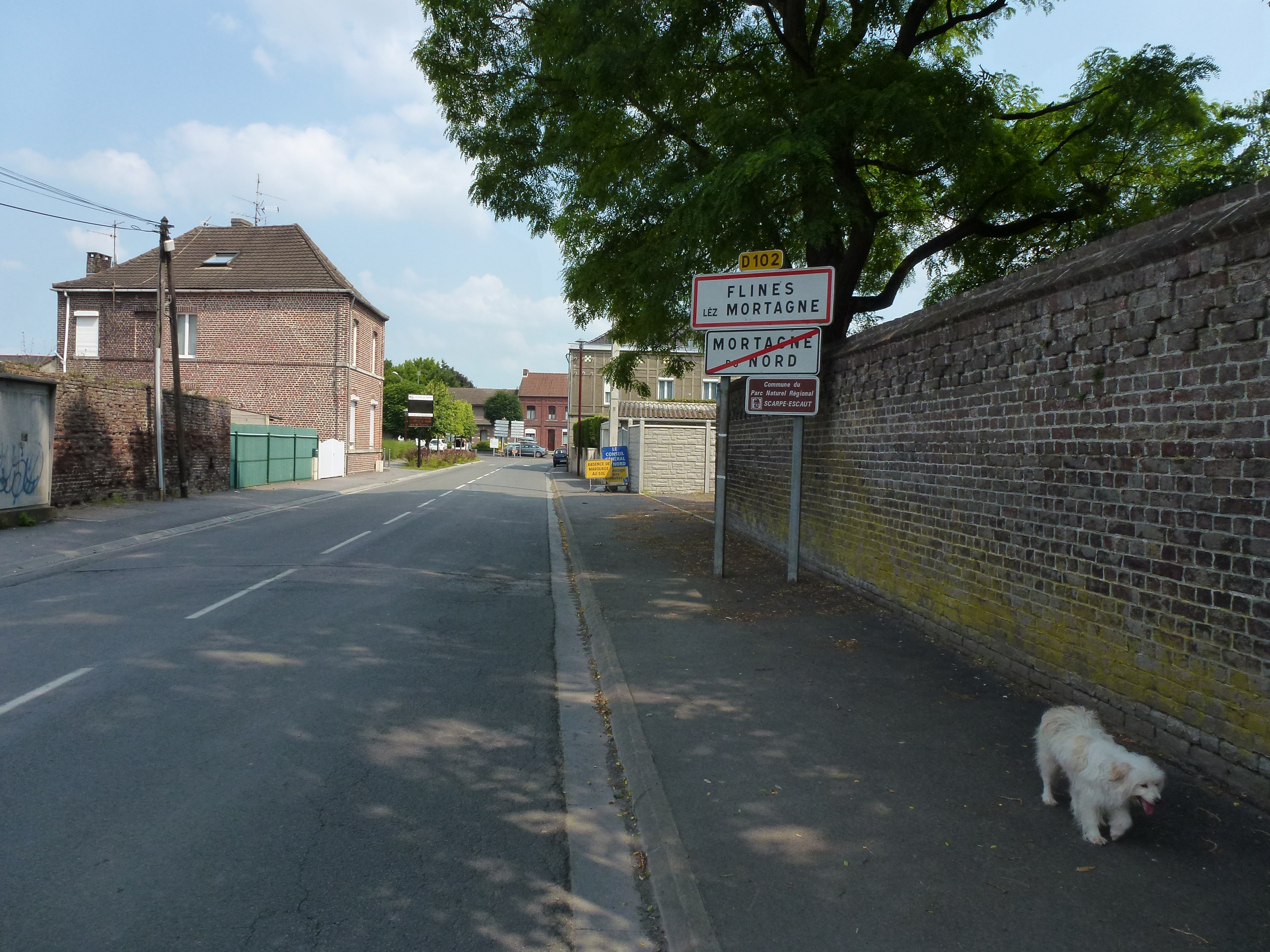
Flines-lès-Mortagne, near Mortagne-du-Nord

The word lès (French pronunciation: [lɛ], and [lɛz‿] with liaison) is an archaic French preposition meaning "near", "nearby", or "next to". Today it occurs only in place names to distinguish places with the same name.

The word lès has two variants: lez and les. The latter should not be confused with the plural definite article les (e.g. les-Bains, "the Baths").

== Etymology ==
The word lès and its variants derive from late Latin latus, "side". The preposition is not used anymore in French, but remains still nowadays in other Langues d'oïl such as the Walloon language with dilé (close to) and adlé (among).

== Examples ==
=== Lès ===
- Villeneuve-lès-Avignon, near Avignon
- Beaumont-lès-Valence, near Valence
- Saint-Rémy-lès-Chevreuse, near Chevreuse
- Margny-lès-Compiègne, near Compiègne
- Asnières-lès-Dijon, near Dijon
- Fontaine-lès-Dijon, near Dijon
- Hauteville-lès-Dijon, near Dijon
- Neuilly-lès-Dijon, near Dijon
- Perrigny-lès-Dijon, near Dijon
- Plombières-lès-Dijon, near Dijon
- Sennecey-lès-Dijon, near Dijon
- Garges-lès-Gonesse, near Gonesse
- Bonchamp-lès-Laval, near Laval
- Fontaine-lès-Luxeuil, near Luxeuil-les-Bains
- Sainte-Foy-lès-Lyon, near Lyon
- Longeville-lès-Metz, near Metz
- Montigny-lès-Metz, near Metz
- Saint-Julien-lès-Metz, near Metz
- Flines-lès-Mortagne, near Mortagne-du-Nord
- Essey-lès-Nancy, near Nancy
- Vandœuvre-lès-Nancy, near Nancy
- Saulxures-lès-Nancy, near Nancy
- Villers-lès-Nancy, near Nancy
- Déville-lès-Rouen, near Rouen
- Sotteville-lès-Rouen, near Rouen
- Nieul-lès-Saintes, near Saintes
- Chambray-lès-Tours, near Tours
- Joué-lès-Tours, near Tours
- Saint-Martin-lès-Seyne, near Seyne
- Bourg-lès-Valence, near Valence
- Béning-lès-Saint-Avold, near Saint-Avold
- Savigny-lès-Beaune, near Beaune
- …

=== Lez ===
- Auchy-lez-Orchies, near Orchies
- Aulnoy-lez-Valenciennes, near Valenciennes
- Bougy-lez-Neuville, near Neuville-aux-Bois
- Bruille-lez-Marchiennes, near Marchiennes
- Flines-lez-Raches, near Râches
- Hallennes-lez-Haubourdin, near Haubourdin
- Houdain-lez-Bavay, near Bavay
- Lambres-lez-Douai, near Douai
- Lys-lez-Lannoy, near Lannoy
- Marquette-lez-Lille, near Lille
- Mézières-lez-Cléry, near Cléry
- Nissan-lez-Enserune, near Enserune
- Poilly-lez-Gien, near Gien
- Sailly-lez-Cambrai, near Cambrai
- Sailly-lez-Lannoy, near Lannoy
- Saint-André-lez-Lille, near Lille
- Saint-Hilaire-lez-Cambrai, near Cambrai
- Tilloy-lez-Cambrai, near Cambrai
- Tilloy-lez-Marchiennes, near Marchiennes
- Villy-lez-Falaise, near Falaise
- …

=== Les ===
- Avesnes-les-Aubert, near Aubert
- Châteauneuf-les-Martigues, near Martigues
- Chorey-les-Beaune, near Beaune
- La Queue-les-Yvelines, near (the historical region of) Yvelines
- Villars-les-Dombes, near Dombes
