= Neuilly-lès-Dijon =

- Part of Neuilly-Crimolois
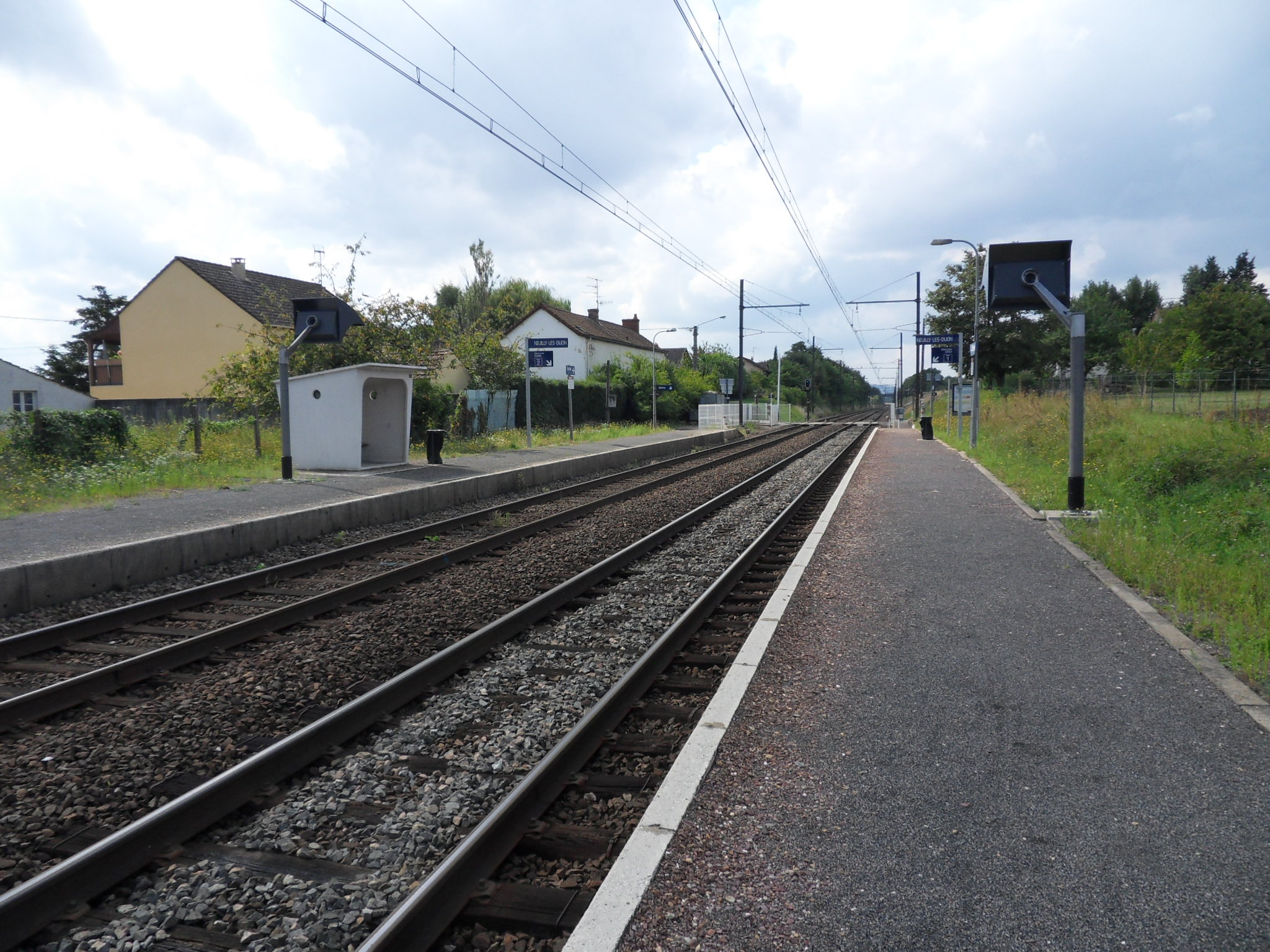
- The railway station in Neuilly-lès-Dijon

- Coat of arms
- Location of Neuilly-lès-Dijon
- Location within France Location within Bourgogne-Franche-Comté
- Coordinates: 47°16′49″N 5°06′30″E
- Country: France
- Region: Bourgogne-Franche-Comté
- Department: Côte-d'Or
- Arrondissement: Dijon
- Canton: Chevigny-Saint-Sauveur
- Commune: Neuilly-Crimolois
- Area^{1}: 4.62 km^{2} (1.78 sq mi)
- Highest elevation: 232 m (761 ft)
- Lowest elevation: 212 m (696 ft)
- Population (2022): 2,436
  - Density: 527/km^{2} (1,370/sq mi)
- Time zone: UTC+01:00 (CET)
  - Summer (DST): UTC+02:00 (CEST)
- Postal code: 21800
- ^{1} French Land Register data, which excludes lakes, ponds, glaciers > 1 km^{2} (0.386 sq mi or 247 acres) and river estuaries.

Neuilly-lès-Dijon (French pronunciation: [nœji lɛ diʒɔ̃], literally Neuilly near Dijon) is a former commune in the Côte-d'Or department in eastern France. On 28 February 2019, it was merged into the new commune Neuilly-Crimolois.

== Population ==
Historical population
Year	Pop.	±% p.a.
1962	548	—
1968	637	+2.54%
1975	1,555	+13.60%
1982	1,395	−1.54%
1990	1,926	+4.11%
1999	2,142	+1.19%
2022	2,436	+0.56%
Source: EHESS and INSEE

== See also ==
- Communes of the Côte-d'Or department
