= Crimolois =

Commune in Côte-d'Or, France

- Part of Neuilly-Crimolois
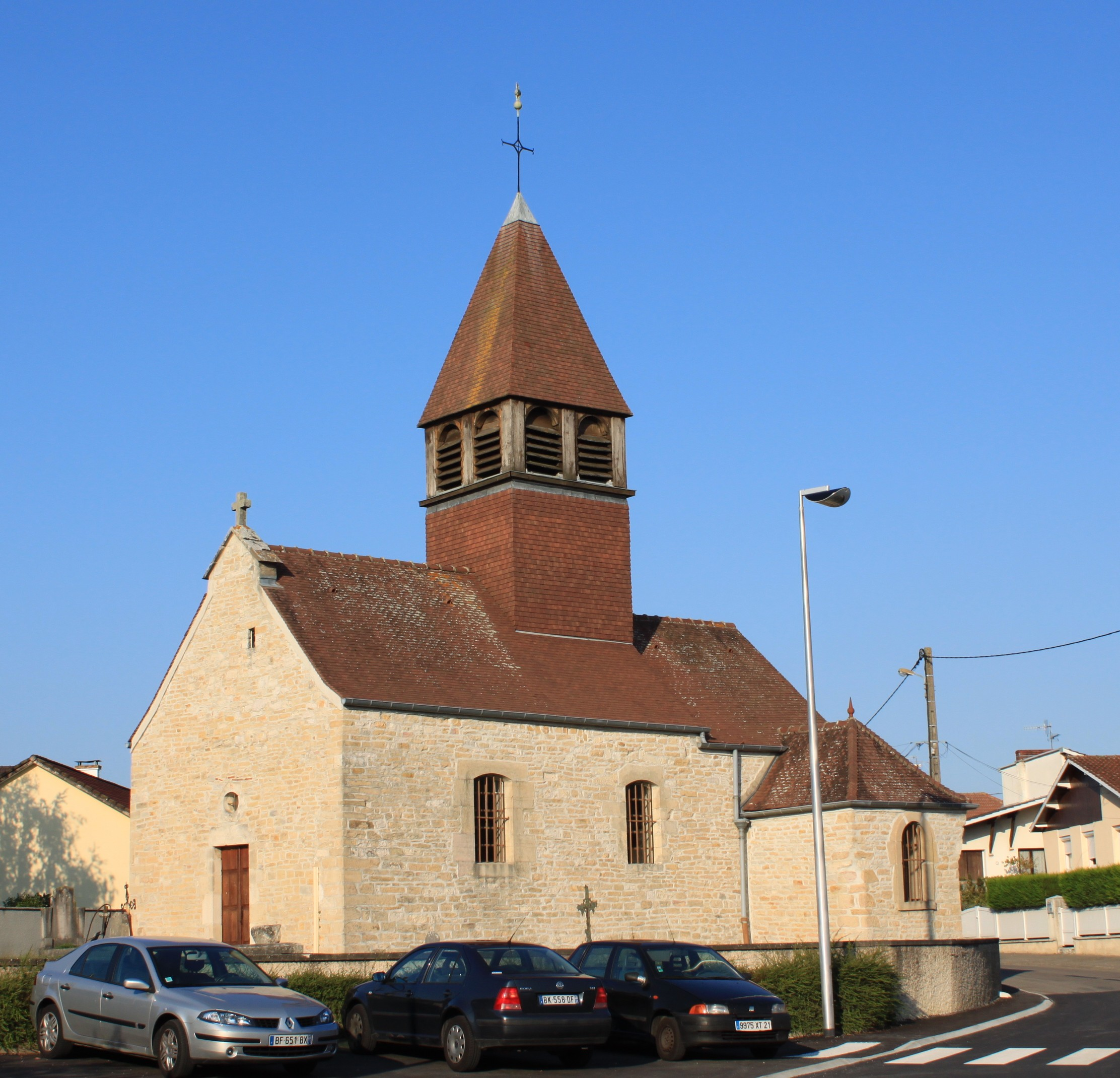
- The church in Crimolois

- Coat of arms
- Location of Crimolois
- Location within France Location within Bourgogne-Franche-Comté
- Coordinates: 47°16′29″N 5°07′18″E
- Country: France
- Region: Bourgogne-Franche-Comté
- Department: Côte-d'Or
- Arrondissement: Dijon
- Canton: Chevigny-Saint-Sauveur
- Commune: Neuilly-Crimolois
- Area^{1}: 3.59 km^{2} (1.39 sq mi)
- Highest elevation: 229 m (751 ft)
- Lowest elevation: 208 m (682 ft)
- Population (2022): 994
  - Density: 277/km^{2} (717/sq mi)
- Time zone: UTC+01:00 (CET)
  - Summer (DST): UTC+02:00 (CEST)
- Postal code: 21800
- ^{1} French Land Register data, which excludes lakes, ponds, glaciers > 1 km^{2} (0.386 sq mi or 247 acres) and river estuaries.

Crimolois (French pronunciation: [kʁimɔlwa]) is a former commune in the Côte-d'Or department in eastern France. On 28 February 2019, it was merged into the new commune Neuilly-Crimolois.

== Population ==
Historical population
Year	Pop.	±% p.a.
1962	260	—
1968	279	+1.18%
1975	341	+2.91%
1982	388	+1.86%
1990	505	+3.35%
1999	523	+0.39%
2022	994	+2.83%
Source: EHESS and INSEE

== See also ==
- Communes of the Côte-d'Or department
