= Magny-sur-Tille =

- Commune
- Coat of arms
- Location of Magny-sur-Tille
- Location within France Location within Bourgogne-Franche-Comté
- Coordinates: 47°09′49″N 5°06′09″E
- Country: France
- Region: Bourgogne-Franche-Comté
- Department: Côte-d'Or
- Arrondissement: Dijon
- Canton: Chevigny-Saint-Sauveur
- Intercommunality: Dijon Métropole

Government
  - Mayor (2020–2026): Nicolas Bourny
- Area^{1}: 10.56 km^{2} (4.08 sq mi)
- Highest elevation: 221 m (725 ft)
- Lowest elevation: 200 m (660 ft)
- Population (2023): 874
  - Density: 82.8/km^{2} (214/sq mi)
- Time zone: UTC+01:00 (CET)
  - Summer (DST): UTC+02:00 (CEST)
- INSEE/Postal code: 21370 /21110
- ^{1} French Land Register data, which excludes lakes, ponds, glaciers > 1 km^{2} (0.386 sq mi or 247 acres) and river estuaries.

Magny-sur-Tille (French pronunciation: [maɲi syʁ tij], literally Magny on Tille) is a commune in the Côte-d'Or department in eastern France.

== Population ==
Historical population
Year	Pop.	±% p.a.
1968	256	—
1975	386	+6.04%
1982	513	+4.15%
1990	576	+1.46%
1999	645	+1.27%
2007	805	+2.81%
2012	854	+1.19%
2017	868	+0.33%
2023	874	+0.11%
Source: INSEE

== See also ==
- Communes of the Côte-d'Or department
