= Neuilly-Crimolois =

- Commune
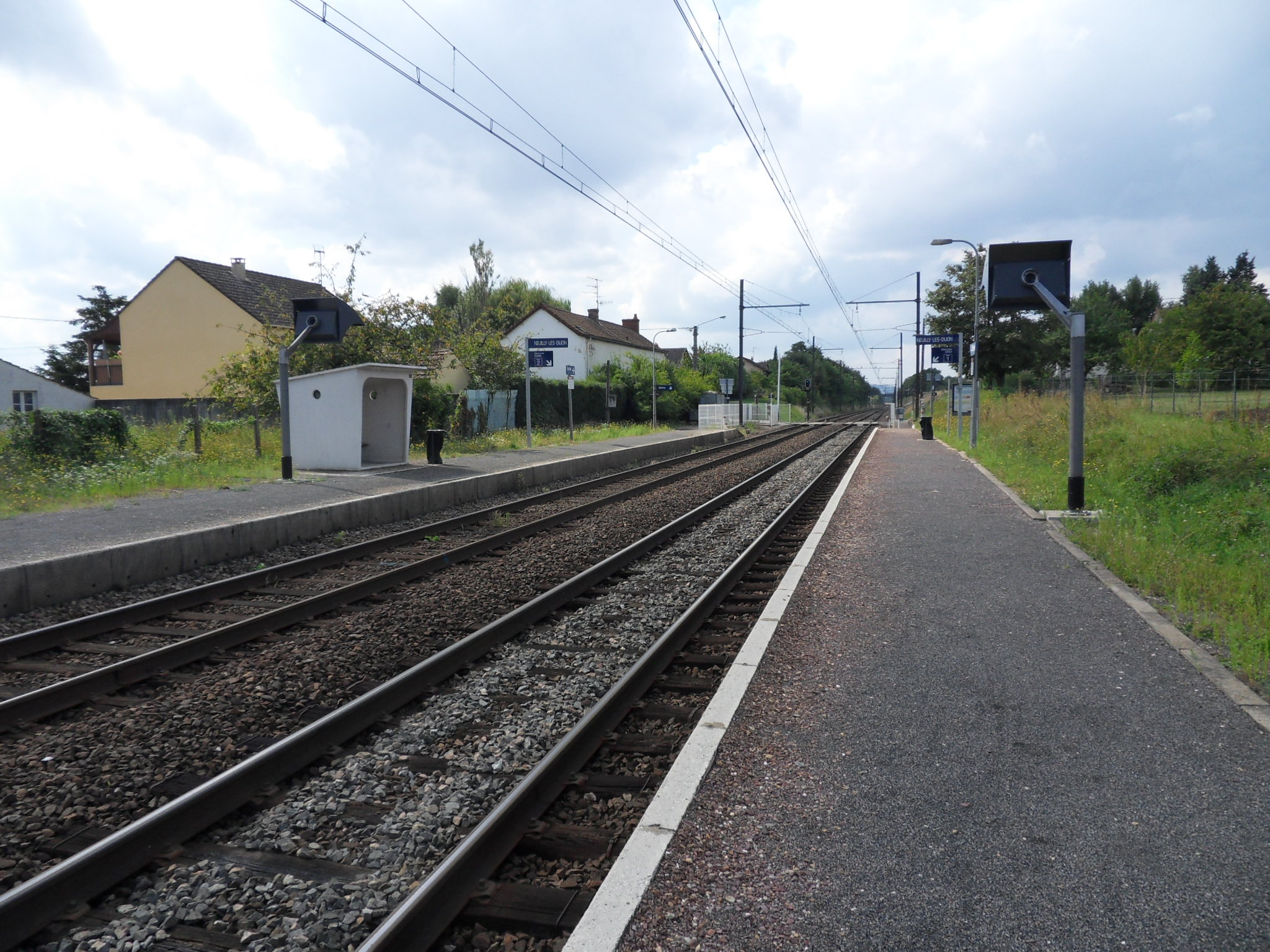
- The railway station in Neuilly-lès-Dijon
- Location of Neuilly-Crimolois
- Location within France Location within Bourgogne-Franche-Comté
- Coordinates: 47°16′49″N 5°06′30″E
- Country: France
- Region: Bourgogne-Franche-Comté
- Department: Côte-d'Or
- Arrondissement: Dijon
- Canton: Chevigny-Saint-Sauveur
- Intercommunality: Dijon Métropole

Government
  - Mayor (2020–2026): Didier Relot
- Area^{1}: 8.21 km^{2} (3.17 sq mi)
- Highest elevation: 232 m (761 ft)
- Lowest elevation: 208 m (682 ft)
- Population (2023): 3,588
  - Density: 437/km^{2} (1,130/sq mi)
- Time zone: UTC+01:00 (CET)
  - Summer (DST): UTC+02:00 (CEST)
- INSEE/Postal code: 21452 /21800
- ^{1} French Land Register data, which excludes lakes, ponds, glaciers > 1 km^{2} (0.386 sq mi or 247 acres) and river estuaries.

Neuilly-Crimolois (French pronunciation: [nœji kʁimɔlwa]) is a commune in the Côte-d'Or department in eastern France. It was established on 28 February 2019 by merger of the former communes of Neuilly-lès-Dijon (the seat) and Crimolois.

== Transportation ==
The commune has a railway station, Neuilly-lès-Dijon, on the Dijon–Vallorbe line.

== Population ==
Historical population
Year	Pop.	±% p.a.
1968	916	—
1975	1,896	+10.95%
1982	1,783	−0.87%
1990	2,431	+3.95%
1999	2,665	+1.03%
2007	2,530	−0.65%
2012	2,599	+0.54%
2017	2,664	+0.50%
2023	3,588	+5.09%
Source: INSEE

== See also ==
- Communes of the Côte-d'Or department
