= Chevigny-Saint-Sauveur =

- Commune
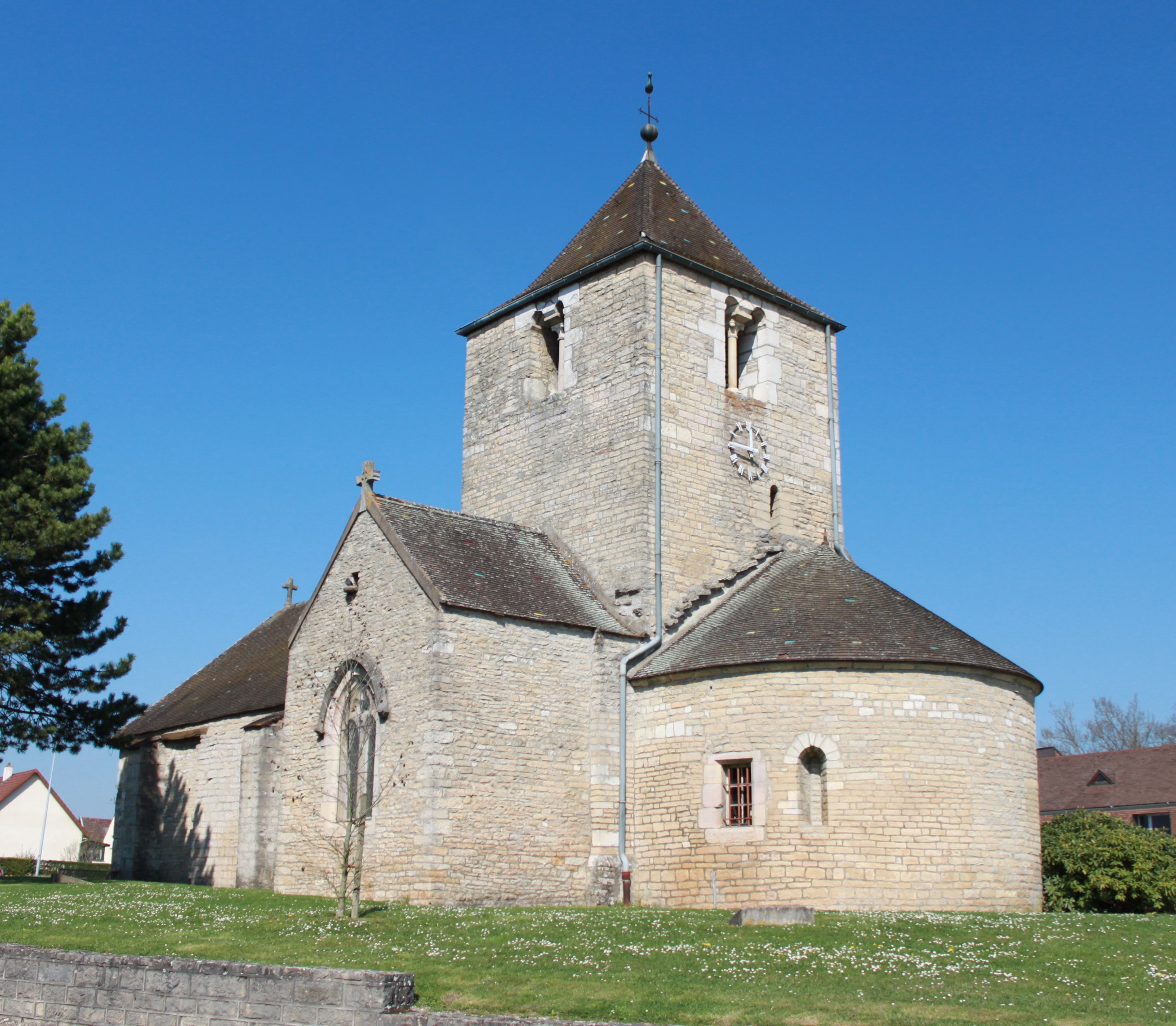
- The church in Chevigny-Saint-Sauveur

- Coat of arms
- Location of Chevigny-Saint-Sauveur
- Location within France Location within Bourgogne-Franche-Comté
- Coordinates: 47°18′09″N 5°08′11″E
- Country: France
- Region: Bourgogne-Franche-Comté
- Department: Côte-d'Or
- Arrondissement: Dijon
- Canton: Chevigny-Saint-Sauveur
- Intercommunality: Dijon Métropole

Government
  - Mayor (2020–2026): Guillaume Ruet
- Area^{1}: 12.11 km^{2} (4.68 sq mi)
- Highest elevation: 233 m (764 ft)
- Lowest elevation: 207 m (679 ft)
- Population (2023): 11,108
  - Density: 917.3/km^{2} (2,376/sq mi)
- Time zone: UTC+01:00 (CET)
  - Summer (DST): UTC+02:00 (CEST)
- INSEE/Postal code: 21171 /21800
- ^{1} French Land Register data, which excludes lakes, ponds, glaciers > 1 km^{2} (0.386 sq mi or 247 acres) and river estuaries.

Chevigny-Saint-Sauveur (French pronunciation: [ʃəviɲi sɛ̃ sovœʁ]) is a commune in the Côte-d'Or department in eastern France.

== Population ==
Historical population
Year	Pop.	±% p.a.
1968	1,412	—
1975	5,647	+21.90%
1982	7,137	+3.40%
1990	8,223	+1.79%
1999	10,141	+2.36%
2007	9,392	−0.95%
2012	10,330	+1.92%
2017	11,326	+1.86%
2023	11,108	−0.32%
Source: INSEE

== See also ==
- Communes of the Côte-d'Or department
