= Hauteville-lès-Dijon =

- Commune
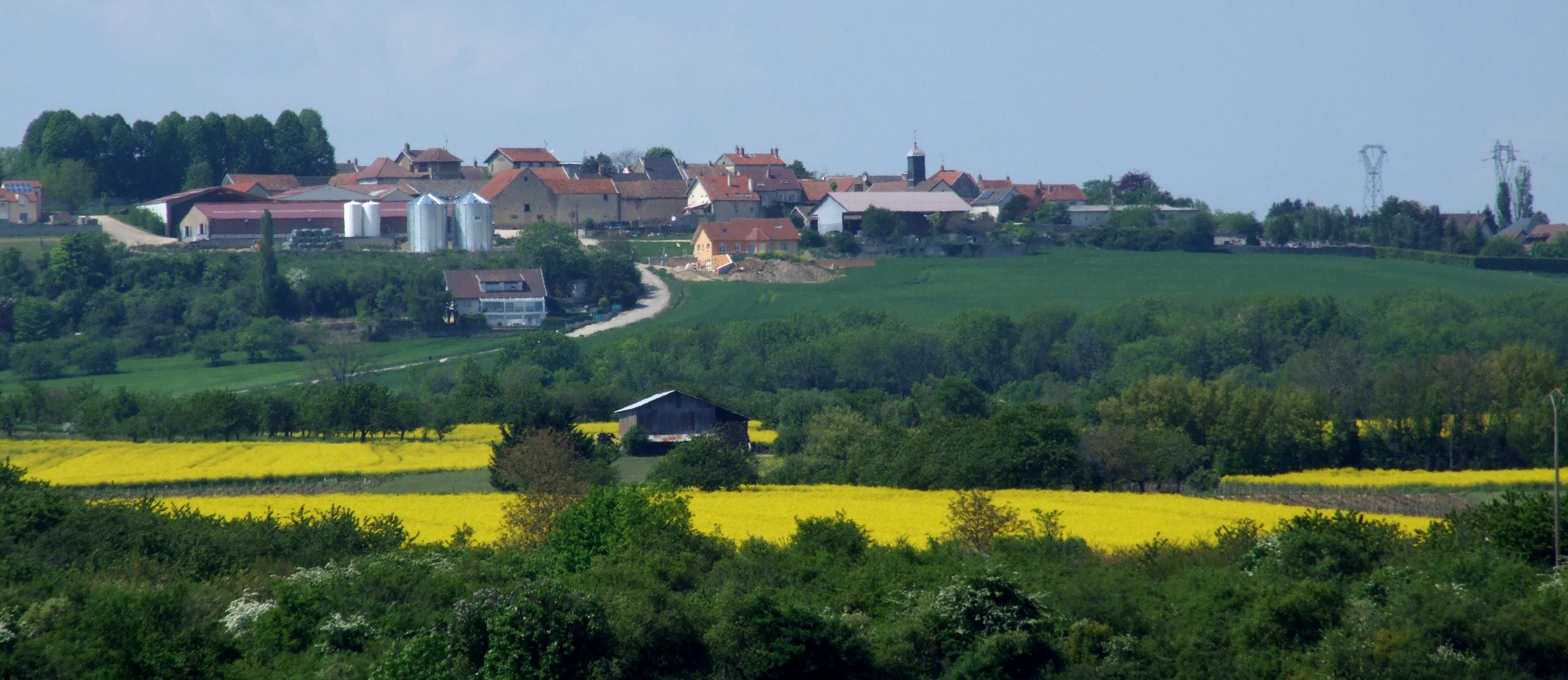
- A general view of Hauteville-lès-Dijon

- Coat of arms
- Location of Hauteville-lès-Dijon
- Location within France Location within Bourgogne-Franche-Comté
- Coordinates: 47°22′00″N 4°59′44″E
- Country: France
- Region: Bourgogne-Franche-Comté
- Department: Côte-d'Or
- Arrondissement: Dijon
- Canton: Fontaine-lès-Dijon
- Intercommunality: Dijon Métropole

Government
  - Mayor (2020–2026): Jacques Carrelet de Loisy
- Area^{1}: 9.01 km^{2} (3.48 sq mi)
- Elevation: 390 m (1,280 ft)
- Highest elevation: 474 m (1,555 ft)
- Lowest elevation: 305 m (1,001 ft)
- Population (2023): 1,195
  - Density: 133/km^{2} (344/sq mi)
- Time zone: UTC+01:00 (CET)
  - Summer (DST): UTC+02:00 (CEST)
- INSEE/Postal code: 21315 /21121
- ^{1} French Land Register data, which excludes lakes, ponds, glaciers > 1 km^{2} (0.386 sq mi or 247 acres) and river estuaries.

Hauteville-lès-Dijon (French pronunciation: [otvil lɛ diʒɔ̃], literally Hauteville near Dijon) is a commune in the Côte-d'Or department in eastern France.

== Population ==
Historical population
Year	Pop.	±% p.a.
1968	224	—
1975	335	+5.92%
1982	663	+10.24%
1990	963	+4.78%
1999	1,023	+0.67%
2007	1,076	+0.63%
2012	1,173	+1.74%
2017	1,219	+0.77%
2023	1,195	−0.33%
Source: INSEE

== See also ==
- Communes of the Côte-d'Or department
