= Bressey-sur-Tille =

- Commune
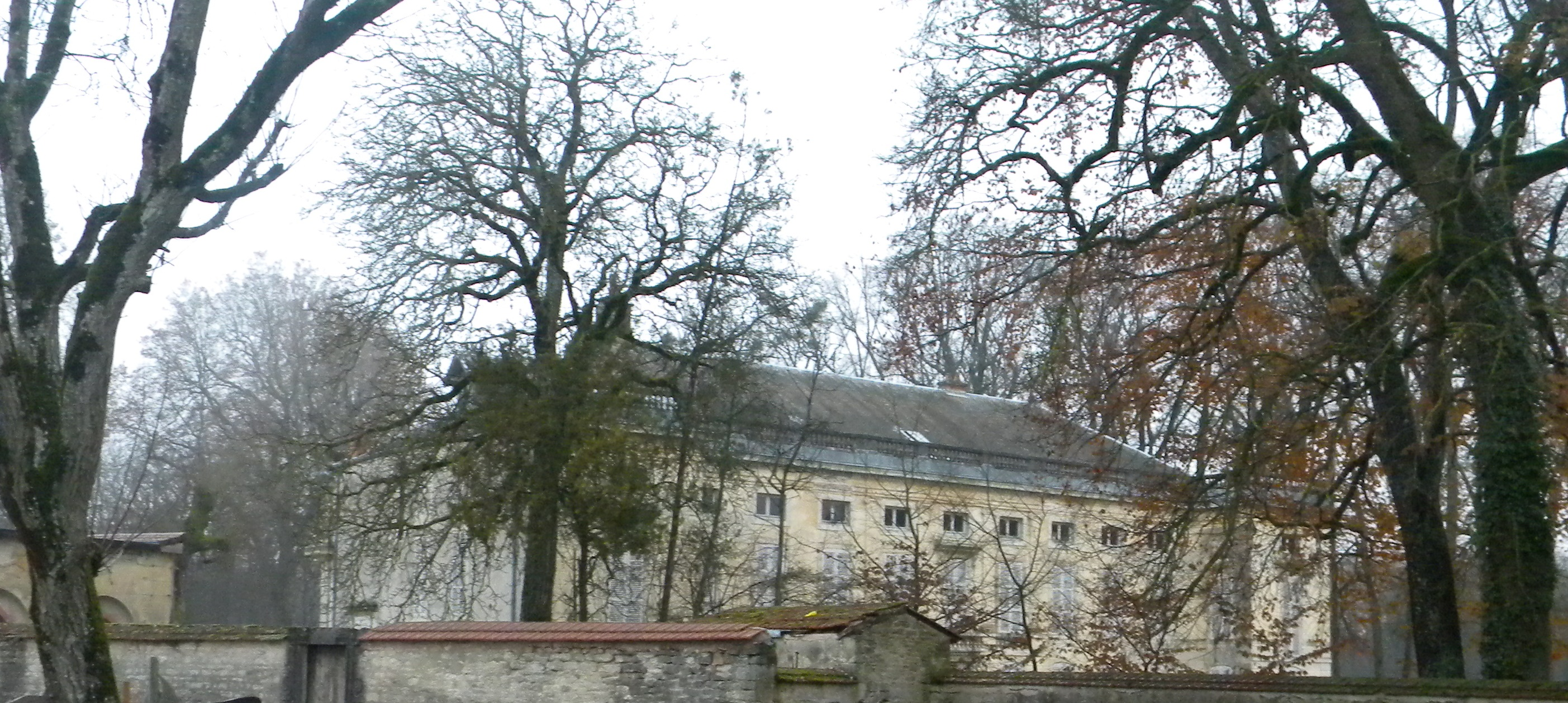
- Chateau
- Location of Bressey-sur-Tille
- Location within France Location within Bourgogne-Franche-Comté
- Coordinates: 47°18′33″N 5°11′02″E
- Country: France
- Region: Bourgogne-Franche-Comté
- Department: Côte-d'Or
- Arrondissement: Dijon
- Canton: Chevigny-Saint-Sauveur
- Intercommunality: Dijon Métropole

Government
  - Mayor (2020–2026): Lionel Sanchez
- Area^{1}: 7.26 km^{2} (2.80 sq mi)
- Highest elevation: 215 m (705 ft)
- Lowest elevation: 207 m (679 ft)
- Population (2023): 1,096
  - Density: 151/km^{2} (391/sq mi)
- Time zone: UTC+01:00 (CET)
  - Summer (DST): UTC+02:00 (CEST)
- INSEE/Postal code: 21105 /21560
- ^{1} French Land Register data, which excludes lakes, ponds, glaciers > 1 km^{2} (0.386 sq mi or 247 acres) and river estuaries.

Bressey-sur-Tille (French pronunciation: [bʁɛsɛ syʁ tij], literally Bressey on Tille) is a commune in the Côte-d'Or department in eastern France.

== Population ==
Historical population
| Year | Pop. | ±% p.a. |
|---|---|---|
| 1968 | 175 | — |
| 1975 | 198 | +1.78% |
| 1982 | 470 | +13.14% |
| 1990 | 499 | +0.75% |
| 1999 | 549 | +1.07% |
| 2007 | 632 | +1.78% |
| 2012 | 707 | +2.27% |
| 2017 | 1,113 | +9.50% |
| 2023 | 1,096 | −0.26% |
Source: INSEE

== See also ==
- Communes of the Côte-d'Or department
