= Sennecey-lès-Dijon =

- Commune
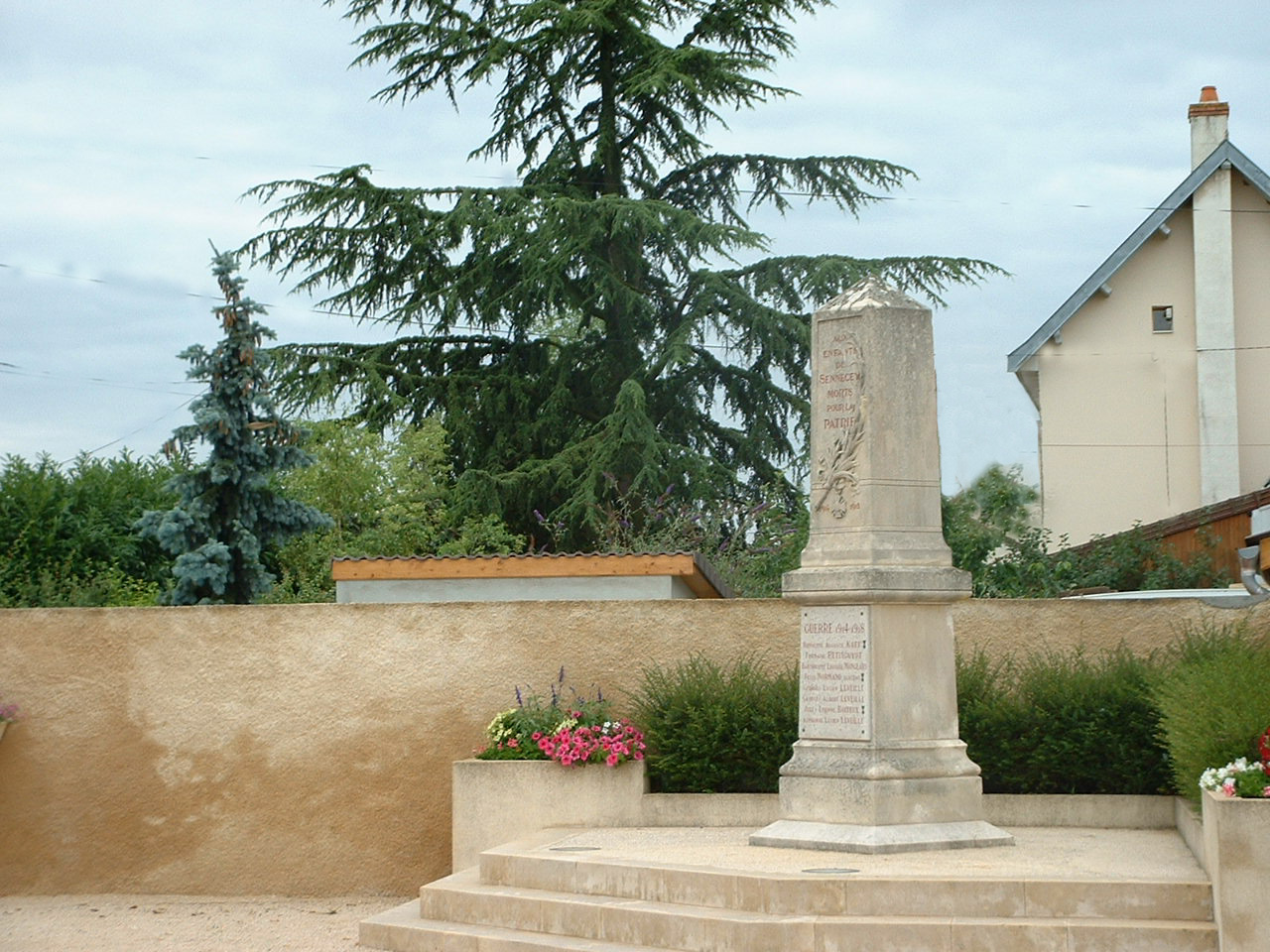
- War memorial

- Coat of arms
- Location of Sennecey-lès-Dijon
- Location within France Location within Bourgogne-Franche-Comté
- Coordinates: 47°17′29″N 5°06′22″E
- Country: France
- Region: Bourgogne-Franche-Comté
- Department: Côte-d'Or
- Arrondissement: Dijon
- Canton: Chevigny-Saint-Sauveur
- Intercommunality: Dijon Métropole

Government
  - Mayor (2020–2026): Philippe Belleville
- Area^{1}: 3.92 km^{2} (1.51 sq mi)
- Highest elevation: 245 m (804 ft)
- Lowest elevation: 210 m (690 ft)
- Population (2023): 2,151
  - Density: 549/km^{2} (1,420/sq mi)
- Time zone: UTC+01:00 (CET)
  - Summer (DST): UTC+02:00 (CEST)
- INSEE/Postal code: 21605 /21800
- ^{1} French Land Register data, which excludes lakes, ponds, glaciers > 1 km^{2} (0.386 sq mi or 247 acres) and river estuaries.

Sennecey-lès-Dijon (French pronunciation: [sɛnsɛ lɛ diʒɔ̃], literally Sennecey near Dijon) is a commune in the Côte-d'Or department in eastern France.

== Population ==
Historical population
Year	Pop.	±% p.a.
1968	749	—
1975	1,073	+5.27%
1982	927	−2.07%
1990	1,535	+6.51%
1999	2,168	+3.91%
2007	2,288	+0.68%
2012	2,160	−1.14%
2017	2,041	−1.13%
2023	2,151	+0.88%
Source: INSEE

== See also ==
- Communes of the Côte-d'Or department
