= Daix =

- Commune
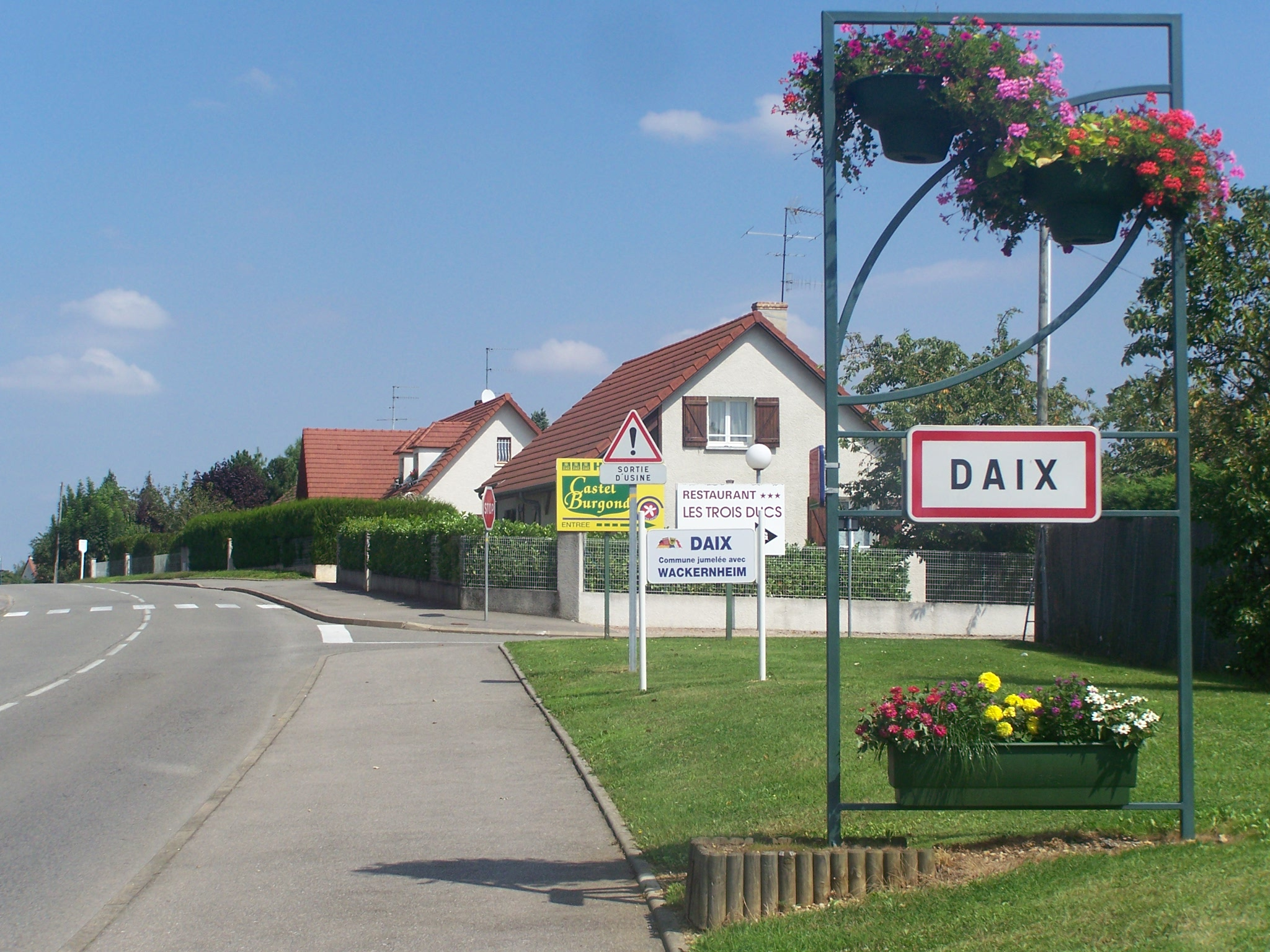
- The road into Daix

- Coat of arms
- Location of Daix
- Location within France Location within Bourgogne-Franche-Comté
- Coordinates: 47°21′10″N 4°59′59″E
- Country: France
- Region: Bourgogne-Franche-Comté
- Department: Côte-d'Or
- Arrondissement: Dijon
- Canton: Fontaine-lès-Dijon
- Intercommunality: Dijon Métropole

Government
  - Mayor (2020–2026): Dominique Begin-Claudet
- Area^{1}: 11.8 km^{2} (4.6 sq mi)
- Elevation: 343 m (1,125 ft)
- Highest elevation: 476 m (1,562 ft)
- Lowest elevation: 290 m (950 ft)
- Population (2023): 1,515
  - Density: 128/km^{2} (333/sq mi)
- Time zone: UTC+01:00 (CET)
  - Summer (DST): UTC+02:00 (CEST)
- INSEE/Postal code: 21223 /21121
- ^{1} French Land Register data, which excludes lakes, ponds, glaciers > 1 km^{2} (0.386 sq mi or 247 acres) and river estuaries.

Daix (French pronunciation: [dɛ]) is a commune in the Côte-d'Or department in eastern France.

== Population ==
Historical population
| Year | Pop. | ±% p.a. |
|---|---|---|
| 1968 | 497 | — |
| 1975 | 533 | +1.00% |
| 1982 | 784 | +5.67% |
| 1990 | 862 | +1.19% |
| 1999 | 1,479 | +6.18% |
| 2007 | 1,411 | −0.59% |
| 2012 | 1,413 | +0.03% |
| 2017 | 1,471 | +0.81% |
| 2023 | 1,515 | +0.49% |
Source: INSEE

== See also ==
- Communes of the Côte-d'Or department
