= Flavignerot =

- Commune
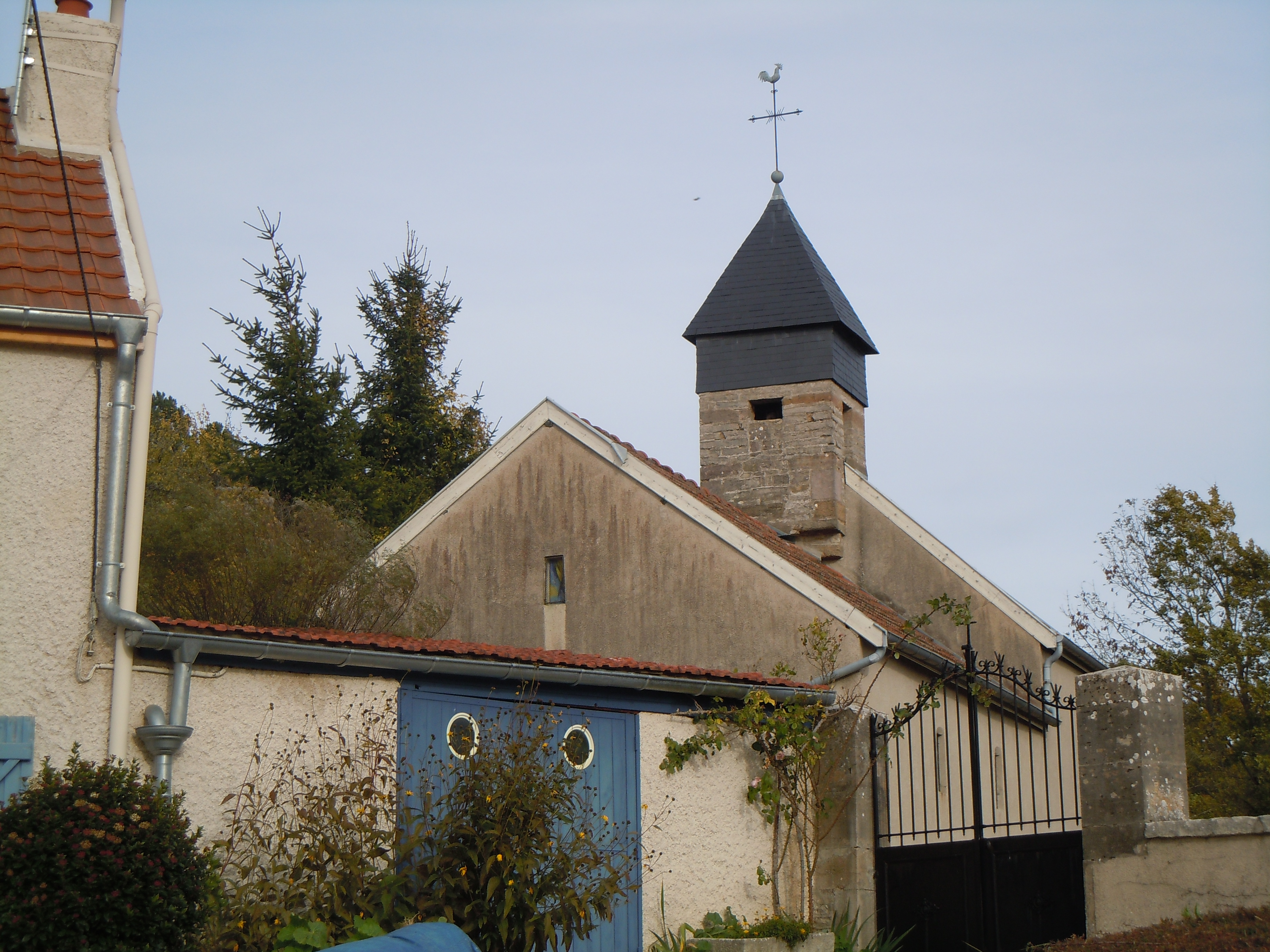
- The church in Flavignerot

- Coat of arms
- Location of Flavignerot
- Location within France Location within Bourgogne-Franche-Comté
- Coordinates: 47°16′48″N 4°55′03″E
- Country: France
- Region: Bourgogne-Franche-Comté
- Department: Côte-d'Or
- Arrondissement: Dijon
- Canton: Dijon-6
- Intercommunality: Dijon Métropole

Government
  - Mayor (2025–2026): François Sarron-Pillot
- Area^{1}: 6.29 km^{2} (2.43 sq mi)
- Highest elevation: 598 m (1,962 ft)
- Lowest elevation: 320 m (1,050 ft)
- Population (2023): 232
  - Density: 36.9/km^{2} (95.5/sq mi)
- Time zone: UTC+01:00 (CET)
  - Summer (DST): UTC+02:00 (CEST)
- INSEE/Postal code: 21270 /21160
- ^{1} French Land Register data, which excludes lakes, ponds, glaciers > 1 km^{2} (0.386 sq mi or 247 acres) and river estuaries.

Flavignerot (French pronunciation: [flaviɲʁo]) is a commune in the Côte-d'Or department in eastern France.

== History ==
In antiquity, Flavignerot was originally an ancient Gallo-Roman settlement under its Latin name, Flaviniacum. Its nearby summit Mont Afrique was a camp site called Camp de Cesar, where the Roman senator Julius Caesar never set foot on the peak.

In 1979, the Carmel of Dijon monastery was relocated from Dijon to a hill near Flavignerot.

== Population ==
Historical population
Year	Pop.	±% p.a.
1968	51	—
1975	72	+5.05%
1982	131	+8.93%
1990	165	+2.93%
1999	153	−0.84%
2007	167	+1.10%
2012	160	−0.85%
2017	184	+2.83%
2023	232	+3.94%
Source: INSEE

== See also ==
- Communes of the Côte-d'Or department
