= Dijon Métropole =

Coordinates: 47°19′N 5°02′E

- Métropole
- Location of Dijon Métropole in the Côte-d'Or department .
- Interactive map of Dijon Métropole
- Country: France
- Region: Bourgogne-Franche-Comté
- Department: Côte-d'Or
- No. of communes: {{{nbcomm}}}
- Established: April 25, 2017
- Area: 240.0 km^{2} (92.7 sq mi)
- Population (2018): 253,859
  - Density: 1,058/km^{2} (2,740/sq mi)
- Website: www.grand-dijon.fr

Dijon Métropole (French pronunciation: [diʒɔ̃ metʁɔpɔl]) is the métropole, an intercommunal structure, centered around the city of Dijon. It is located in the Côte-d'Or department, in the Bourgogne-Franche-Comté region, eastern France. It was created in April 2017, replacing the previous Communauté urbaine du Grand Dijon. Its area is 240.0 km^{2}. Its population was 253,859 in 2018, of which 156,854 in Dijon proper.

== Composition ==
The Dijon Métropole consists of the following 23 communes:

1. Ahuy
2. Bressey-sur-Tille
3. Bretenière
4. Chenôve
5. Chevigny-Saint-Sauveur
6. Corcelles-les-Monts
7. Daix
8. Dijon
9. Fénay
10. Flavignerot
11. Fontaine-lès-Dijon
12. Hauteville-lès-Dijon
13. Longvic
14. Magny-sur-Tille
15. Marsannay-la-Côte
16. Neuilly-Crimolois
17. Ouges
18. Perrigny-lès-Dijon
19. Plombières-lès-Dijon
20. Quetigny
21. Saint-Apollinaire
22. Sennecey-lès-Dijon
23. Talant
