= Canton of Dijon-6 =

Coordinates: 47.31°N 5.01°E

The canton of Dijon-6 is an administrative division of the Côte-d'Or department, eastern France. Its borders were modified at the French canton reorganisation which came into effect in March 2015. Its seat is in Dijon.

It consists of the following communes:

1. Corcelles-les-Monts
2. Dijon (partly)
3. Flavignerot
