= Neuilly-lès-Dijon station =

Railway station in Neuilly-lès-Dijon, France

Neuilly-lès-Dijon
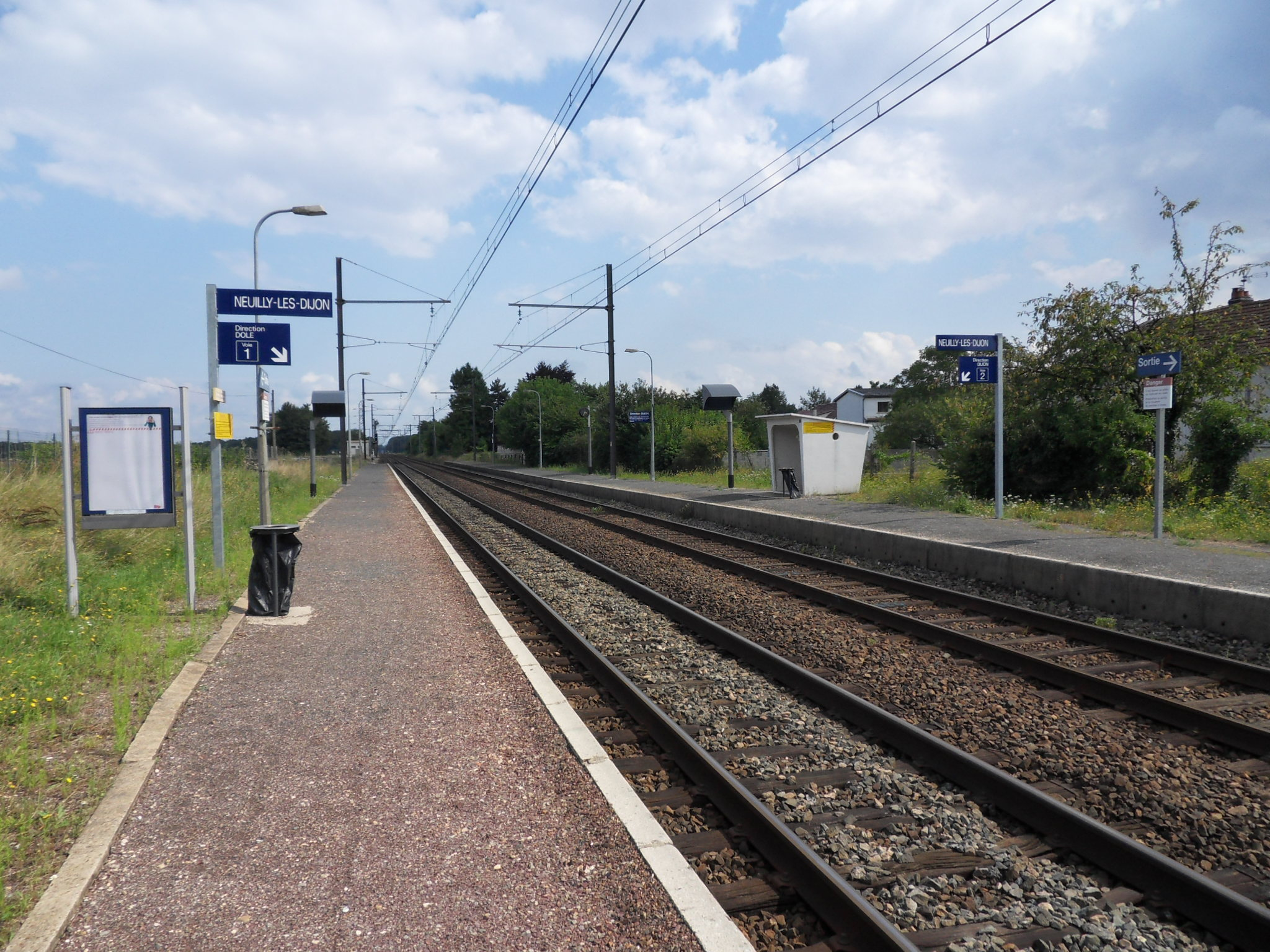
- The station in 2013

General information
- Location: Neuilly-Crimolois; France
- Coordinates: 47°16′54″N 5°06′40″E
- Owner: SNCF
- Line: Dijon–Vallorbe line
- Distance: 323.2 km (200.8 mi) from Paris-Lyon
- Train operators: SNCF

Other information
- Station code: 87712182

Passengers
- 2018: 7,052

Services
Preceding station	TER Bourgogne-Franche-Comté	Following station
Dijon Terminus	TER	Genlis towards Besançon
Location

Neuilly-lès-Dijon station (French: Gare de Neuilly-lès-Dijon) is a railway station in the commune of Neuilly-Crimolois, in the French department of Côte-d'Or, in the Bourgogne-Franche-Comté region. It is an intermediate stop on the Dijon–Vallorbe line of SNCF.

== Services ==
The following services stop at Neuilly-lès-Dijon:

- TER Bourgogne-Franche-Comté: regional service between Dijon-Ville and Besançon-Viotte.
