= Quetigny =

Commune in Côte-d'Or, France

- Commune
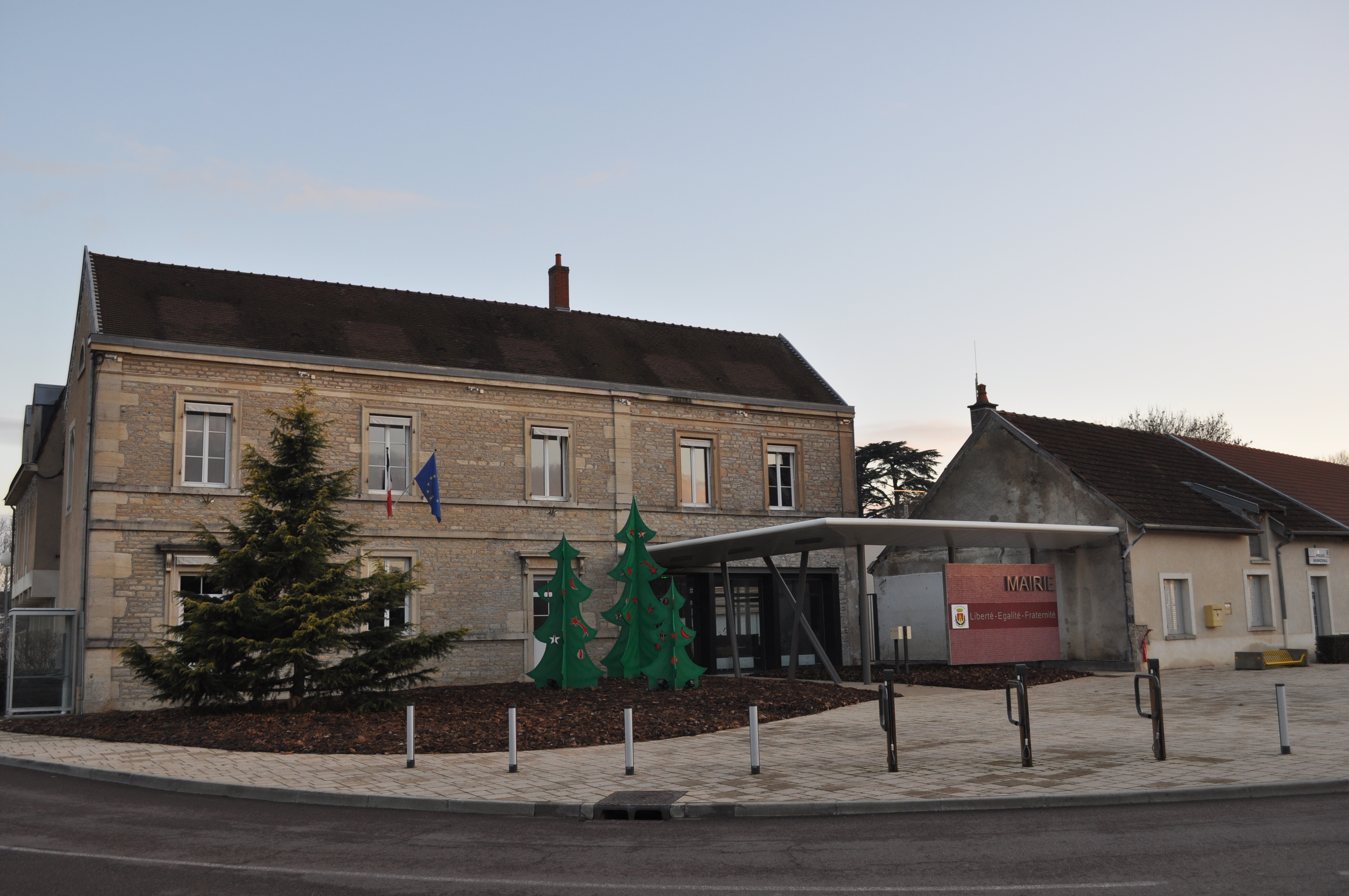
- Town hall

- Coat of arms
- Location of Quetigny
- Location within France Location within Bourgogne-Franche-Comté
- Coordinates: 47°18′55″N 5°06′25″E
- Country: France
- Region: Bourgogne-Franche-Comté
- Department: Côte-d'Or
- Arrondissement: Dijon
- Canton: Chevigny-Saint-Sauveur
- Intercommunality: Dijon Métropole

Government
  - Mayor (2020–2026): Rémi Détang
- Area^{1}: 8.19 km^{2} (3.16 sq mi)
- Highest elevation: 251 m (823 ft)
- Lowest elevation: 211 m (692 ft)
- Population (2023): 8,971
  - Density: 1,100/km^{2} (2,840/sq mi)
- Time zone: UTC+01:00 (CET)
  - Summer (DST): UTC+02:00 (CEST)
- INSEE/Postal code: 21515 /21800
- ^{1} French Land Register data, which excludes lakes, ponds, glaciers > 1 km^{2} (0.386 sq mi or 247 acres) and river estuaries.

Quetigny (French pronunciation: [kətiɲi]) is a commune in the Côte-d'Or department in eastern France.

== Geography ==
=== Climate ===
Quetigny has an oceanic climate (Köppen climate classification Cfb). The average annual temperature in Quetigny is 10.7 °C (51.3 °F). The average annual rainfall is 767.5 mm (30.22 in) with May as the wettest month. The temperatures are highest on average in July, at around 19.9 °C (67.8 °F), and lowest in January, at around 1.9 °C (35.4 °F). The highest temperature ever recorded in Quetigny was 39.8 °C (103.6 °F) on 7 August 2003; the coldest temperature ever recorded was −23.8 °C (−10.8 °F) on 9 January 1985.

Climate data for Quetigny (1981–2010 averages, extremes 1982−2010)
Month	Jan	Feb	Mar	Apr	May	Jun	Jul	Aug	Sep	Oct	Nov	Dec	Year
Record high °C (°F)	14.5 (58.1)	20.1 (68.2)	24.6 (76.3)	27.5 (81.5)	31.8 (89.2)	36.0 (96.8)	37.9 (100.2)	39.8 (103.6)	31.9 (89.4)	27.6 (81.7)	19.7 (67.5)	17.4 (63.3)	39.8 (103.6)
Mean daily maximum °C (°F)	4.9 (40.8)	7.2 (45.0)	11.9 (53.4)	15.4 (59.7)	19.8 (67.6)	23.5 (74.3)	26.7 (80.1)	26.0 (78.8)	21.6 (70.9)	15.9 (60.6)	9.3 (48.7)	5.6 (42.1)	15.7 (60.3)
Daily mean °C (°F)	1.9 (35.4)	3.2 (37.8)	6.7 (44.1)	9.6 (49.3)	13.9 (57.0)	17.2 (63.0)	19.9 (67.8)	19.5 (67.1)	15.8 (60.4)	11.4 (52.5)	5.9 (42.6)	2.8 (37.0)	10.7 (51.3)
Mean daily minimum °C (°F)	−1.1 (30.0)	−0.7 (30.7)	1.5 (34.7)	3.9 (39.0)	8.0 (46.4)	10.9 (51.6)	13.0 (55.4)	13.0 (55.4)	10.0 (50.0)	6.8 (44.2)	2.5 (36.5)	0.0 (32.0)	5.7 (42.3)
Record low °C (°F)	−23.8 (−10.8)	−18.1 (−0.6)	−12.9 (8.8)	−4.7 (23.5)	−2.8 (27.0)	0.7 (33.3)	3.2 (37.8)	3.1 (37.6)	−0.2 (31.6)	−6.0 (21.2)	−10.2 (13.6)	−20.2 (−4.4)	−23.8 (−10.8)
Average precipitation mm (inches)	57.7 (2.27)	45.2 (1.78)	48.6 (1.91)	59.8 (2.35)	84.4 (3.32)	71.8 (2.83)	65.0 (2.56)	61.6 (2.43)	67.2 (2.65)	70.5 (2.78)	72.6 (2.86)	63.1 (2.48)	767.5 (30.22)
Average precipitation days (≥ 1.0 mm)	11.4	9.3	9.7	10.1	11.2	8.8	8.2	8.1	8.2	10.7	10.9	11.7	118.3
Source: Meteociel

== Population ==
Historical population

Year	Pop.	±% p.a.
1793	293	—
1800	300	+0.34%
1806	302	+0.11%
1821	297	−0.11%
1836	294	−0.07%
1841	321	+1.77%
1846	338	+1.04%
1851	358	+1.16%
1856	359	+0.06%
1861	352	−0.39%
1866	357	+0.28%
1872	338	−0.91%
1876	326	−0.90%
1881	323	−0.18%
1886	334	+0.67%
1891	335	+0.06%
1896	321	−0.85%
1901	318	−0.19%

Year	Pop.	±% p.a.
1906	319	+0.06%
1911	347	+1.70%
1921	281	−2.09%
1926	283	+0.14%
1931	309	+1.77%
1936	306	−0.19%
1946	322	+0.51%
1954	326	+0.15%
1962	481	+4.98%
1968	1,219	+16.76%
1975	4,596	+20.88%
1982	7,292	+6.82%
1990	9,230	+2.99%
1999	9,410	+0.21%
2007	9,598	+0.25%
2012	9,690	+0.19%
2017	9,557	−0.28%
2023	8,971	−1.05%

Source: EHESS and INSEE (1968-2023)

== Sister cities ==
- Bous, Germany
- Koulikoro, Mali

== See also ==
- Communes of the Côte-d'Or department
