= Lesdain =

- Commune
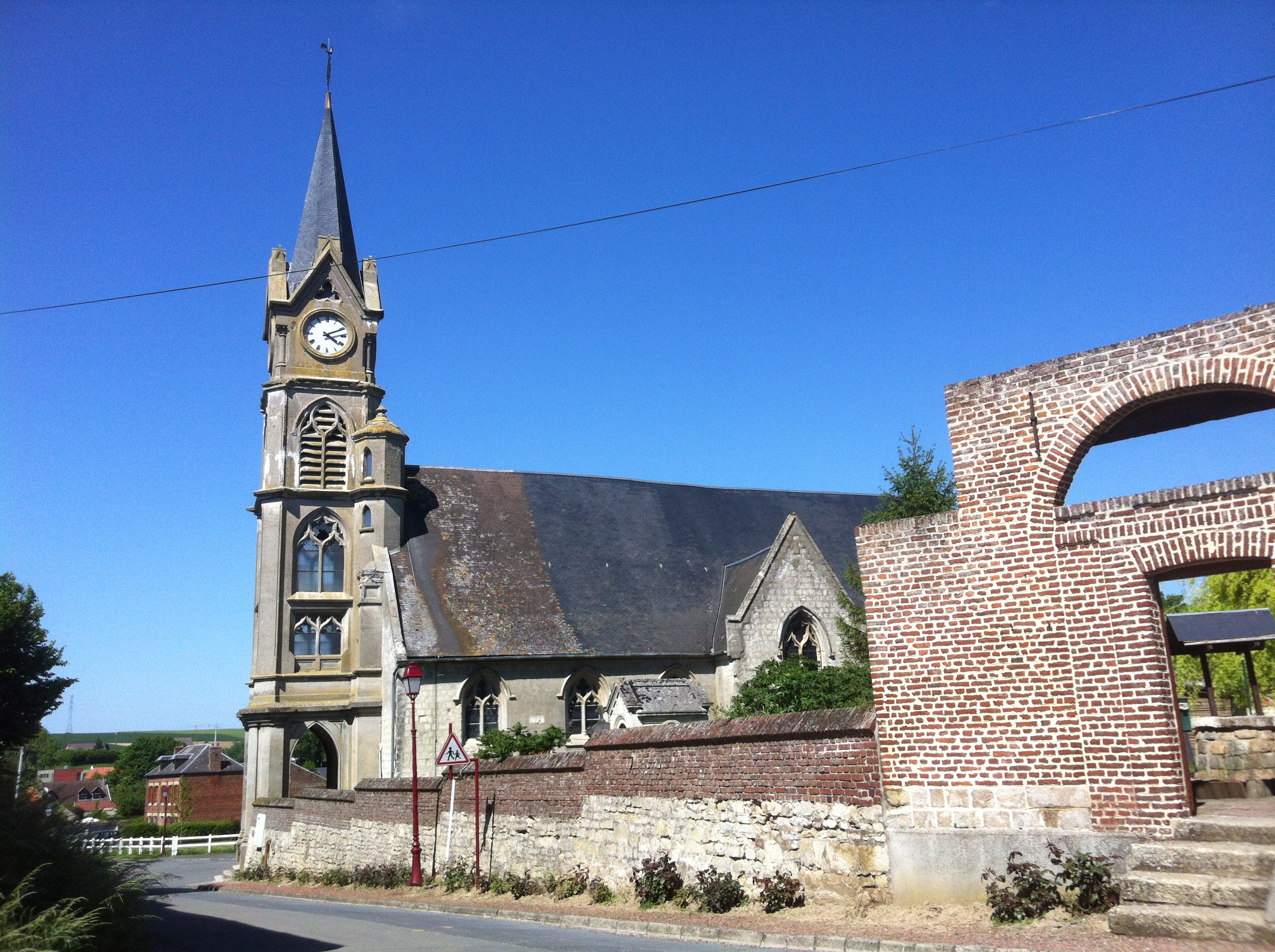
- The church in Lesdain

- Coat of arms
- Location of Lesdain
- Location within France Location within Hauts-de-France
- Coordinates: 50°06′03″N 3°16′06″E
- Country: France
- Region: Hauts-de-France
- Department: Nord
- Arrondissement: Cambrai
- Canton: Le Cateau-Cambrésis
- Intercommunality: CA Cambrai

Government
  - Mayor (2020–2026): Geneviève Gautier
- Area^{1}: 8.43 km^{2} (3.25 sq mi)
- Elevation: 74 m (243 ft)
- Highest elevation: 137 m (449 ft)
- Lowest elevation: 64 m (210 ft)
- Population (2023): 432
  - Density: 51.2/km^{2} (133/sq mi)
- Time zone: UTC+01:00 (CET)
  - Summer (DST): UTC+02:00 (CEST)
- INSEE/Postal code: 59341 /59258
- ^{1} French Land Register data, which excludes lakes, ponds, glaciers > 1 km^{2} (0.386 sq mi or 247 acres) and river estuaries.

Lesdain (French pronunciation: [ledɛ̃]) is a commune in the Nord department in northern France.

== Heraldry ==
Arms of Lesdain	The arms of Lesdain are blazoned : Or, 3 chevrons gules. (Ivry-la-Bataille, Lesdain, Saint-Aubert and Tilloy-lez-Cambrai use the same arms.)

== See also ==
- Communes of the Nord department
