= Perrigny-lès-Dijon =

- Commune
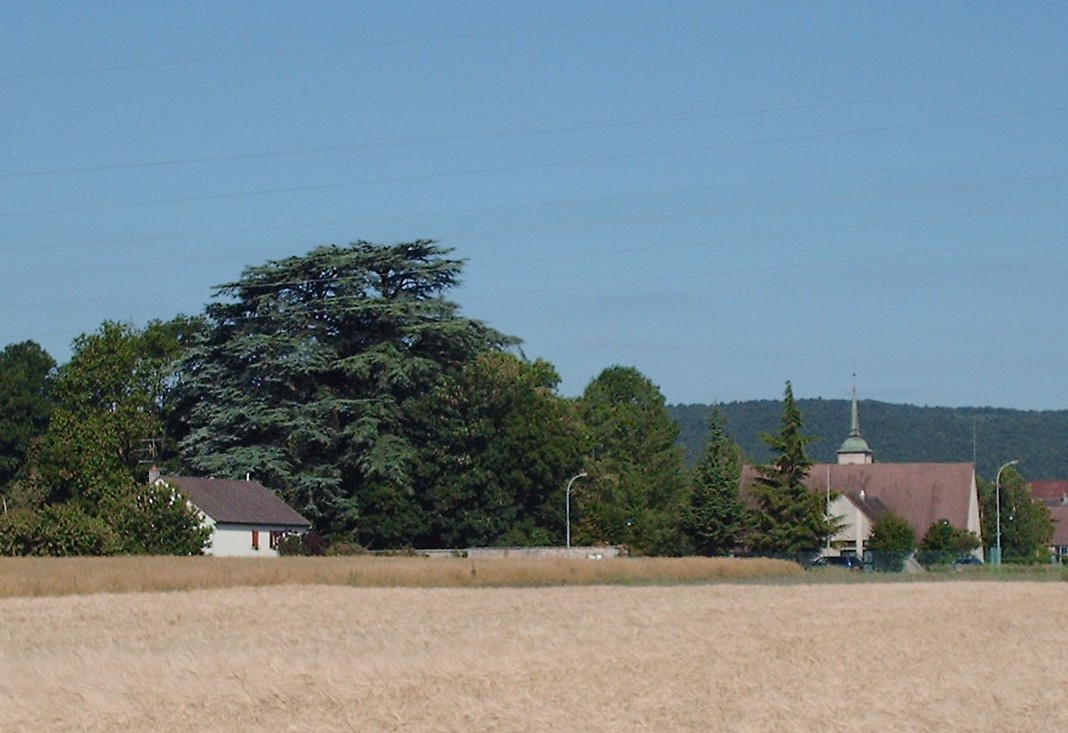
- A general view of Perrigny-lès-Dijon

- Coat of arms
- Location of Perrigny-lès-Dijon
- Location within France Location within Bourgogne-Franche-Comté
- Coordinates: 47°15′59″N 5°00′28″E
- Country: France
- Region: Bourgogne-Franche-Comté
- Department: Côte-d'Or
- Arrondissement: Dijon
- Canton: Longvic
- Intercommunality: Dijon Métropole

Government
  - Mayor (2020–2026): Patrick Baudement
- Area^{1}: 6.71 km^{2} (2.59 sq mi)
- Highest elevation: 264 m (866 ft)
- Lowest elevation: 224 m (735 ft)
- Population (2023): 2,385
  - Density: 355/km^{2} (921/sq mi)
- Time zone: UTC+01:00 (CET)
  - Summer (DST): UTC+02:00 (CEST)
- INSEE/Postal code: 21481 /21160
- ^{1} French Land Register data, which excludes lakes, ponds, glaciers > 1 km^{2} (0.386 sq mi or 247 acres) and river estuaries.

Perrigny-lès-Dijon (French pronunciation: [pɛʁiɲi lɛ diʒɔ̃], literally Perrigny near Dijon) is a commune in the Côte-d'Or department in eastern France.

== Population ==
Historical population

Year	Pop.	±% p.a.
1793	222	—
1821	247	+0.38%
1841	301	+0.99%
1861	356	+0.84%
1881	367	+0.15%
1901	377	+0.13%
1921	334	−0.60%
1931	373	+1.11%
1936	402	+1.51%
1946	404	+0.05%
1954	448	+1.30%

Year	Pop.	±% p.a.
1962	635	+4.46%
1968	726	+2.26%
1975	809	+1.56%
1982	1,039	+3.64%
1990	1,381	+3.62%
1999	1,648	+1.98%
2007	1,473	−1.39%
2012	1,461	−0.16%
2017	1,915	+5.56%
2023	2,385	+3.73%

Source: EHESS and INSEE (1968-2023)

== See also ==
- Communes of the Côte-d'Or department
