= Ahuy =

- Commune
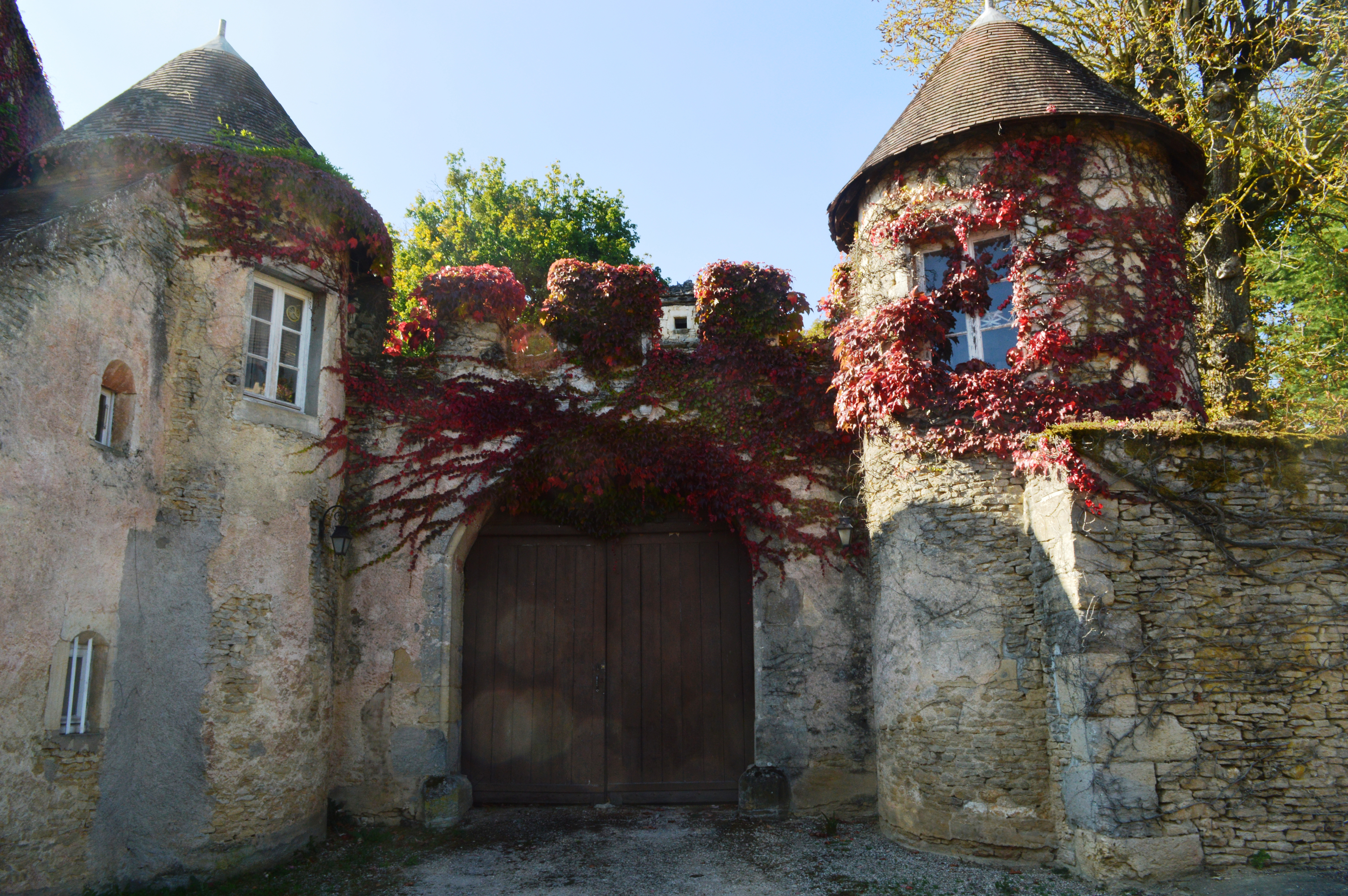
- The Portal of the former Priory of the Abbots of Saint-Étienne of Dijon

- Coat of arms
- Location of Ahuy
- Location within France Location within Bourgogne-Franche-Comté
- Coordinates: 47°22′11″N 5°01′23″E
- Country: France
- Region: Bourgogne-Franche-Comté
- Department: Côte-d'Or
- Arrondissement: Dijon
- Canton: Fontaine-lès-Dijon
- Intercommunality: Dijon Métropole

Government
  - Mayor (2020–2026): Dominique Grimpret
- Area^{1}: 6.4 km^{2} (2.5 sq mi)
- Elevation: 273 m (896 ft)
- Highest elevation: 395 m (1,296 ft)
- Lowest elevation: 259 m (850 ft)
- Population (2023): 1,718
  - Density: 270/km^{2} (700/sq mi)
- Time zone: UTC+01:00 (CET)
  - Summer (DST): UTC+02:00 (CEST)
- INSEE/Postal code: 21003 /21700
- ^{1} French Land Register data, which excludes lakes, ponds, glaciers > 1 km^{2} (0.386 sq mi or 247 acres) and river estuaries.

Ahuy (French pronunciation: [aɥi]) is a commune in the Côte-d'Or department in the Bourgogne-Franche-Comté region of eastern France.

== Geography ==
Ahuy is located on the Langres Plateau, 6 km north of Dijon. It can be accessed by road D107A from Dijon in the south passing through the commune and the village and continuing north to join the D966 just north of the commune.

The commune has an average altitude of 350m with the lowest point at the Suzon river in the east and highest point of 395m at the intersection of the Chemin des Vaches (CR21) and the Chemin du Bois de Vantoux (CR18).

The southern part of the commune overlaps with the urban area of Dijon and the area covered by the town is quite large however the rest of the commune is mostly forest in the west and farmland in the east.

The Suzon stream passes through the length of the commune from the north, forming part of the north-eastern boundary and flowing to the southern border and south to Dijon.

=== Heraldry ===
Arms of Ahuy	Blazon: Azure, a fess argent masoned in sable with a port the same, in base a pale wavy in argent, in chief 3 roses of Or seeded in gules posed 1 and 2.

== Administration ==
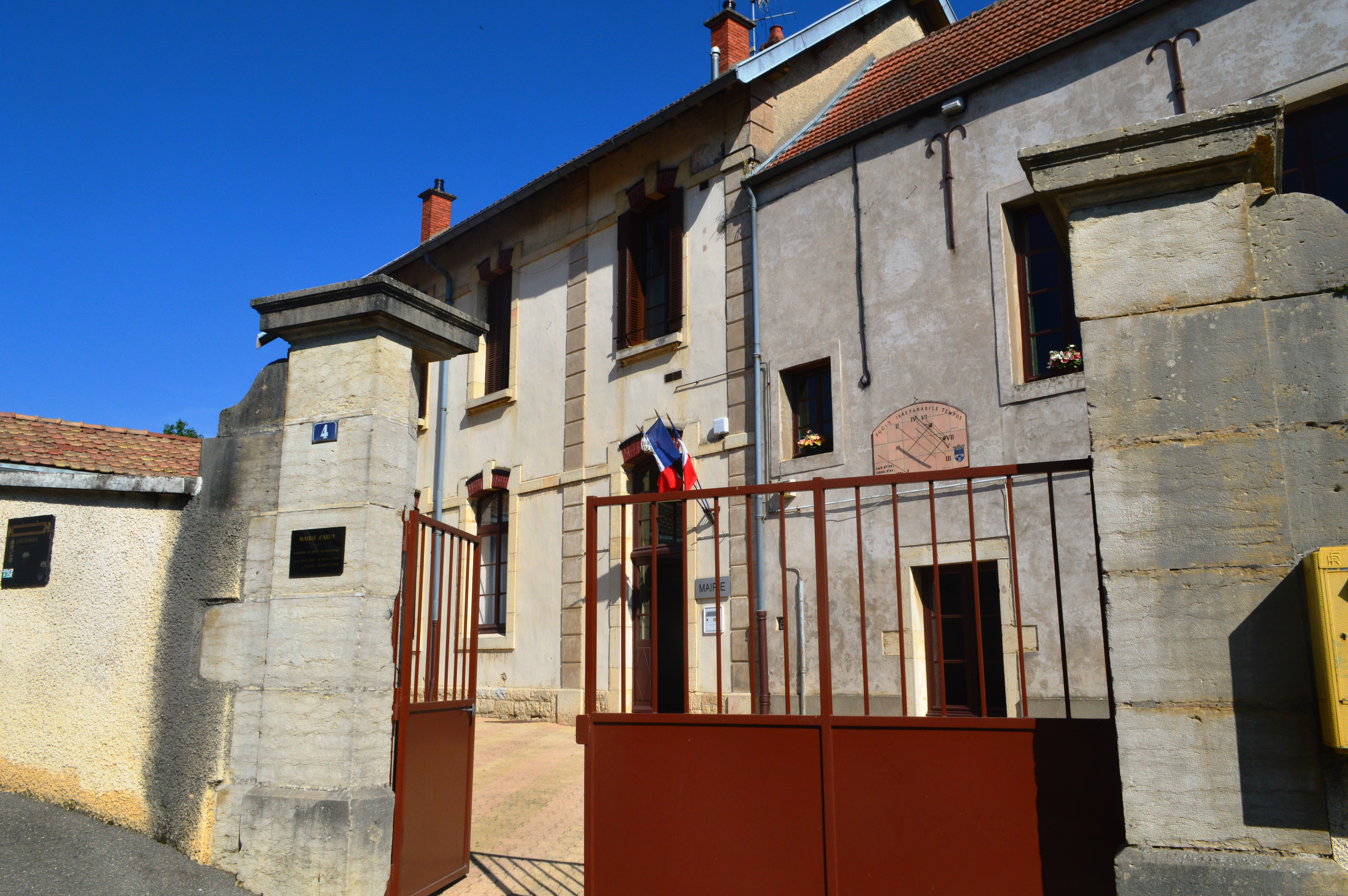
The Town Hall

List of Successive Mayors of Ahuy

From	To	Name	Party
1983	2014	Jean-Claude Douhait	DVD
2014	2026	Dominique Grimpret	MoDem

== Population ==
The inhabitants of the commune are known as Aqueduciens or Aqueduciennes in French.

Historical population

Year	Pop.	±% p.a.
1793	560	—
1821	437	−0.88%
1846	451	+0.13%
1872	388	−0.58%
1901	395	+0.06%
1926	353	−0.45%
1946	383	+0.41%
1954	533	+4.22%
1962	539	+0.14%

Year	Pop.	±% p.a.
1968	603	+1.89%
1975	633	+0.70%
1982	960	+6.13%
1990	1,283	+3.69%
1999	1,356	+0.62%
2007	1,301	−0.52%
2012	1,265	−0.56%
2017	1,210	−0.89%
2023	1,718	+6.02%

Source: EHESS and INSEE

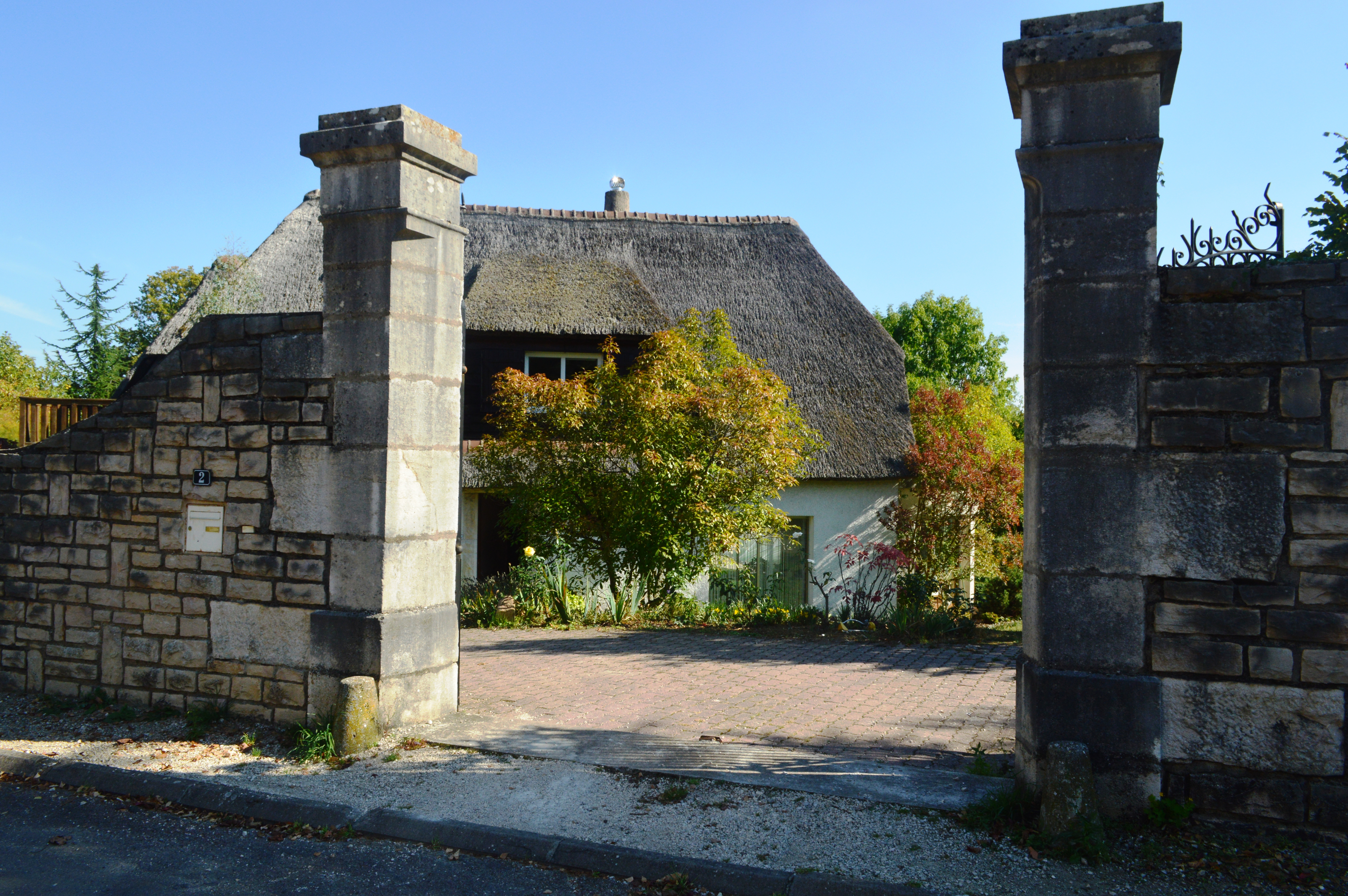
A Thatched House in Ahuy

== Culture and heritage ==
=== Civil heritage ===
The commune has many buildings and structures that are registered as historical monuments:

- A House at 8 Place du 8-Mai-1945 (18th century)
- A Roman Public Bath at 9 Ruelle au Beau (Antiquity)
- Comberons House at Chemin rural No. 11 (19th century)
- A House at 1 Grande-Rue (19th century)
- A House at 19 Grande-Rue (19th century)
- A House at 28 Grande-Rue (19th century)
- A House and Oratory at 3 Grande-Rue (17th century)
- A House at 36 Grande-Rue (19th century)
- A House at 40 Grande-Rue (19th century)
- La Colombière House at 6 Grande-Rue (18th century)
- A Well (19th century)
- A House at 3 Rue du Puits-de-Bois (19th century)
- An Orchard at Rue du Puits-de-Bois (19th century)
- A Farmhouse at 1 Rue des Tilleuls (19th century)
- A House at 13 Rue des Tilleuls (19th century)
- A Portal at 2 Rue des Tilleuls (1669)
- A House at 3 Rue des Tilleuls (1870)
- A Portal at 4 Rue des Tilleuls (17th century)
- A Portal at 3 Rue des Écoles (19th century)

Other sites of interest

- In the Circuit du four à chaux there is an old lime kiln.
- Ahuy is surrounded by walking trails and several hiking trails are accessible only 20 minutes from Dijon town centre by bus or tram. Paths are largely in the forest and marked so that it the walker can choose any suitable route.
- Ahuy also has a football field, next to which tables are installed picnic under trees in a large expanse of grass. This is a very quiet area and sometimes activities are organized. There are also two tennis courts used by the Ahuy tennis club nearby.
- The Mille-club is a festival hall party that hosts several activities.

=== Religious heritage ===
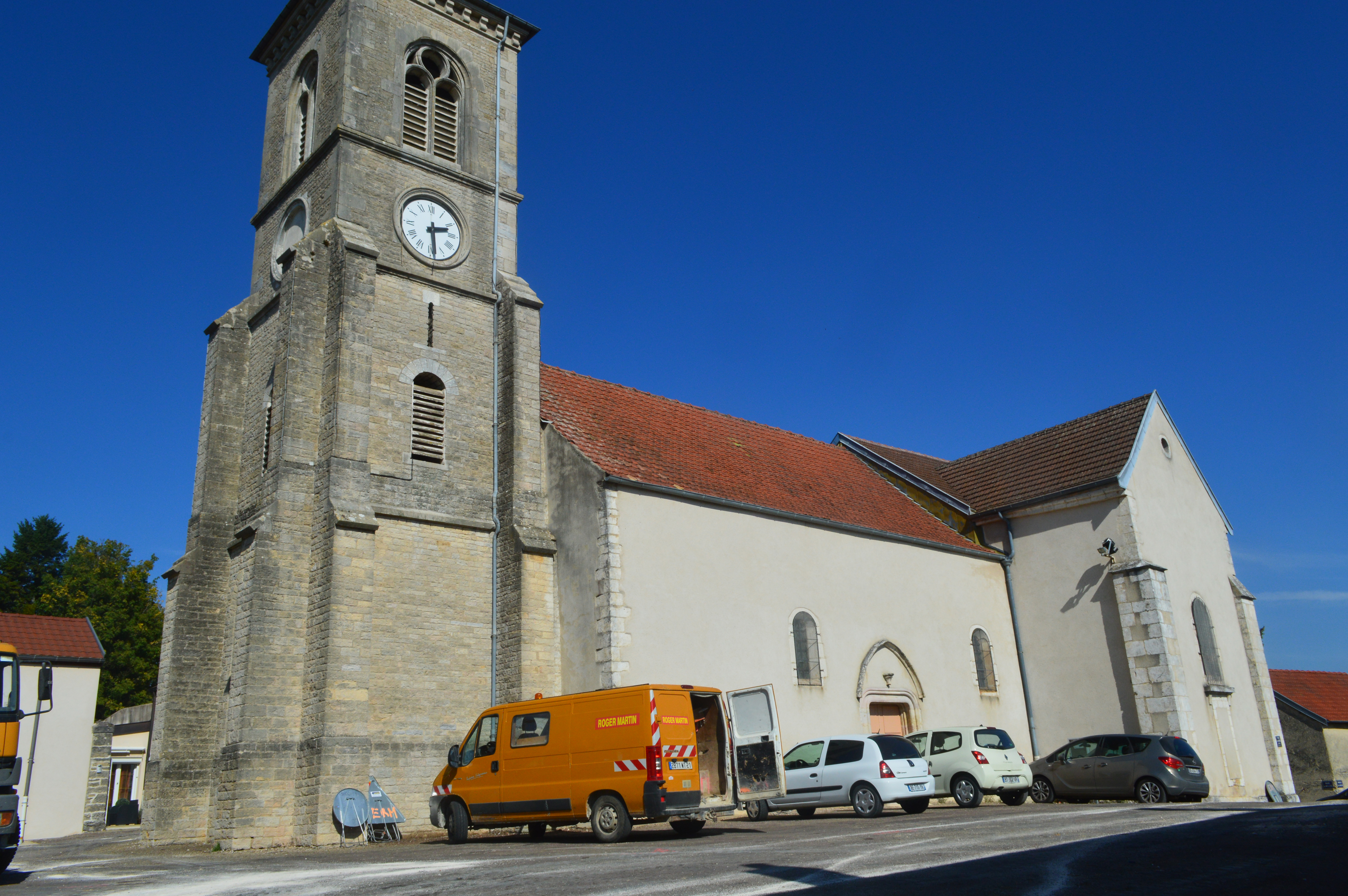
The Church of Saint Agnan

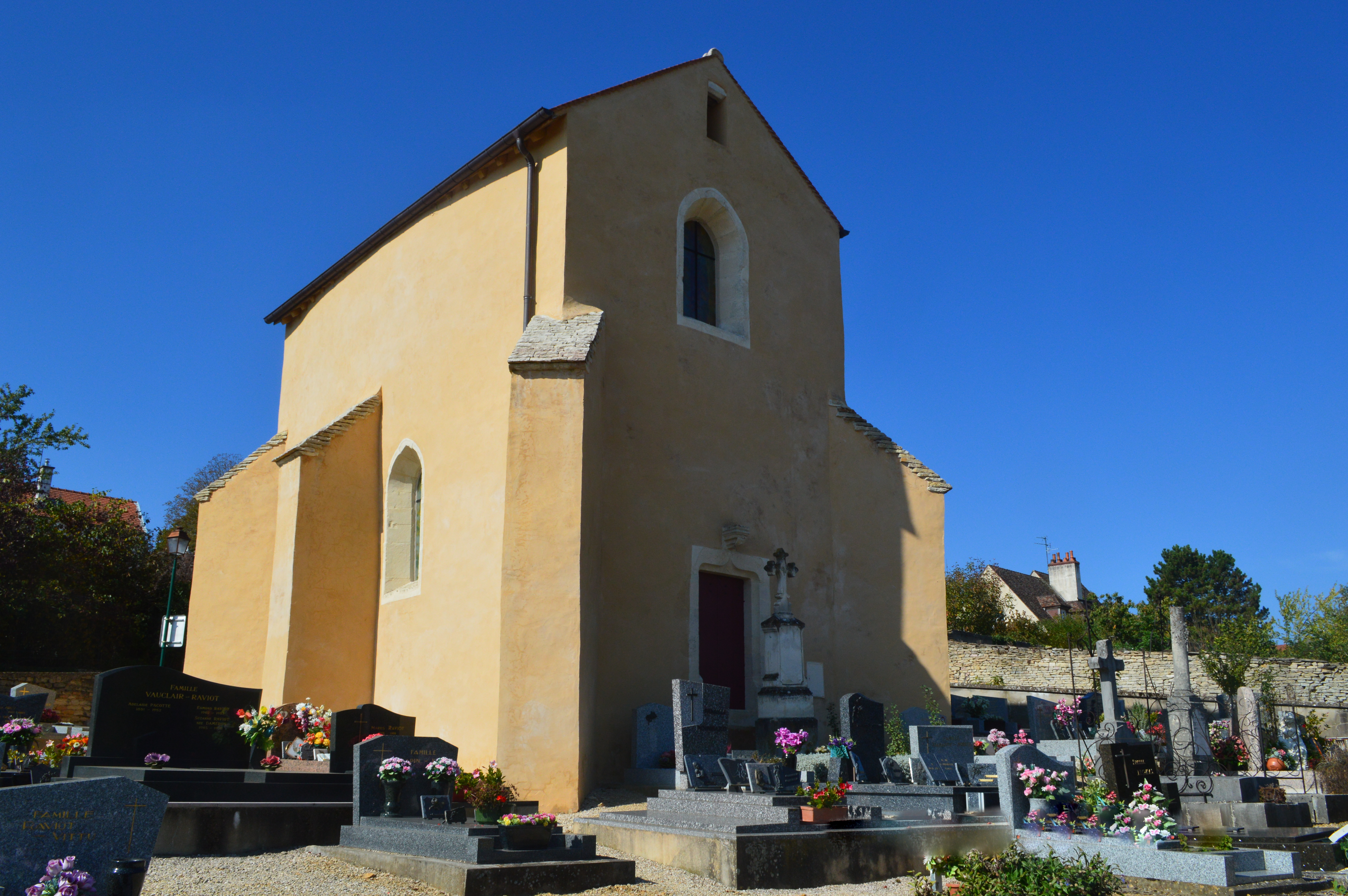
The Belle-Croix Cemetery Chapel

The commune has several religious buildings and structures that are registered as historical monuments:

- The Church of Saint Agnan (12th century). The Church has several items that are registered as historical objects:
  - A Painting: the Crucifixion (16th century)
  - A Statue: Saint Agnan (17th century)
  - A Statue: Saint Bernard (17th century)
  - A Processional Staff: Saint George slaying the dragon (16th century)
  - A Statue: Virgin and child (16th century)
  - A Statue: Virgin and child seated (17th century)
- A Calvary at Chemin du Moulin (19th century)
- The Portal of the former Priory of the Abbots of Saint-Étienne of Dijon (16th century)
- The Belle-Croix Cemetery Chapel (1511). The Chapel has two items which are registered as historical objects:
  - A Bas-relief: Virgin and child (15th century)
  - The Furniture in the Chapel

== Environmental heritage ==
The Plateau of Hauteville and Ahuy is a Site of Community Importance remarkable for its Calcareous grassland type vegetation.

== See also ==
- French wine
- Communes of the Côte-d'Or department
