= Corcelles-les-Monts =

- Commune
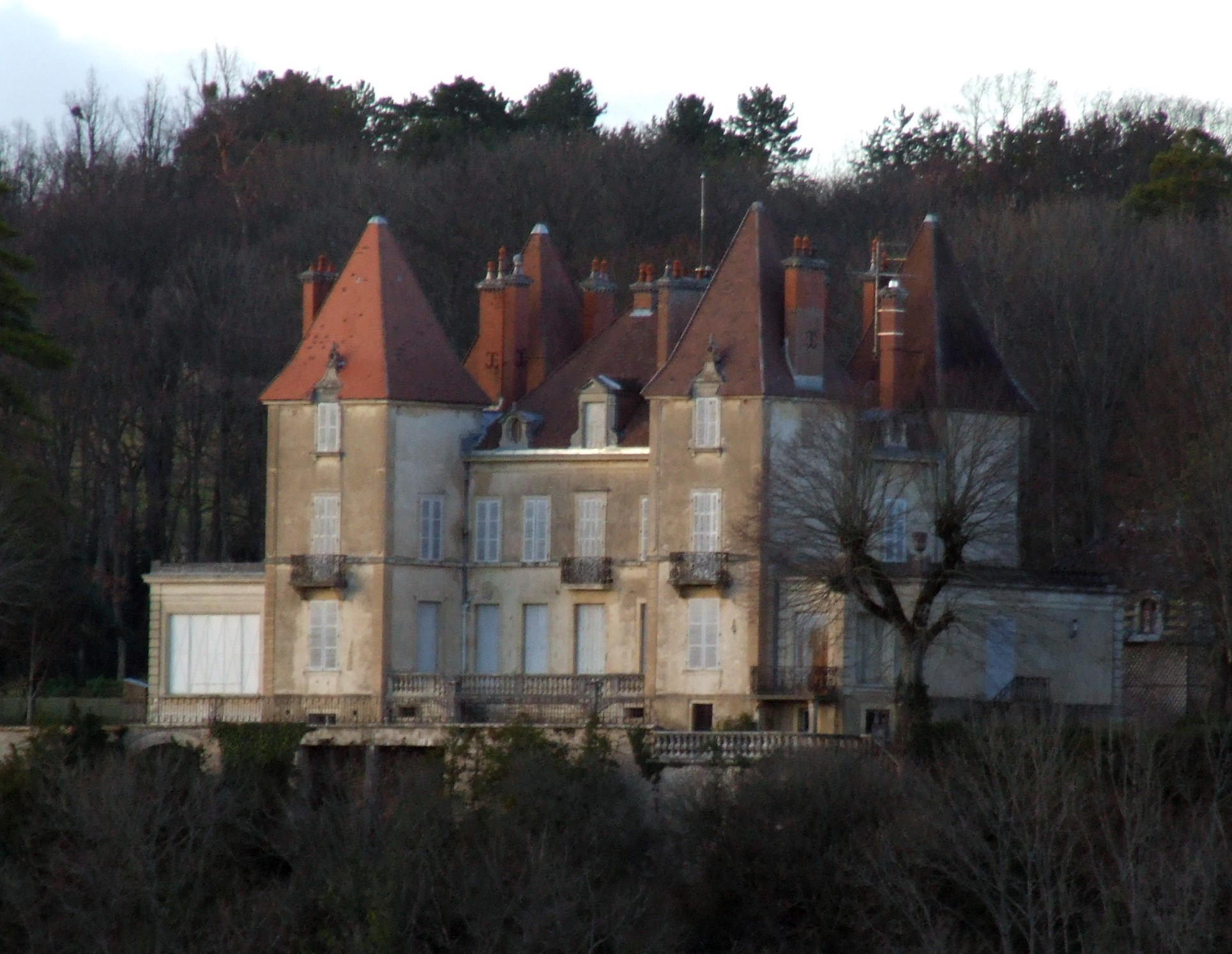
- Château de Gouville

- Coat of arms
- Location of Corcelles-les-Monts
- Location within France Location within Bourgogne-Franche-Comté
- Coordinates: 47°17′43″N 4°56′21″E
- Country: France
- Region: Bourgogne-Franche-Comté
- Department: Côte-d'Or
- Arrondissement: Dijon
- Canton: Dijon-6
- Intercommunality: Dijon Métropole

Government
  - Mayor (2020–2026): Gérard Herrmann
- Area^{1}: 14.33 km^{2} (5.53 sq mi)
- Highest elevation: 601 m (1,972 ft)
- Lowest elevation: 260 m (850 ft)
- Population (2023): 684
  - Density: 47.7/km^{2} (124/sq mi)
- Time zone: UTC+01:00 (CET)
  - Summer (DST): UTC+02:00 (CEST)
- INSEE/Postal code: 21192 /21160
- ^{1} French Land Register data, which excludes lakes, ponds, glaciers > 1 km^{2} (0.386 sq mi or 247 acres) and river estuaries.

Corcelles-les-Monts (French pronunciation: [kɔʁsɛl le mɔ̃]) is a commune in the Côte-d'Or department in eastern France.

== Population ==
Historical population
Year	Pop.	±% p.a.
1968	258	—
1975	328	+3.49%
1982	757	+12.69%
1990	783	+0.42%
1999	709	−1.10%
2007	683	−0.47%
2012	654	−0.86%
2017	640	−0.43%
2023	684	+1.11%
Source: INSEE

== See also ==
- Communes of the Côte-d'Or department
