= Tilloy-lez-Cambrai =

- Commune
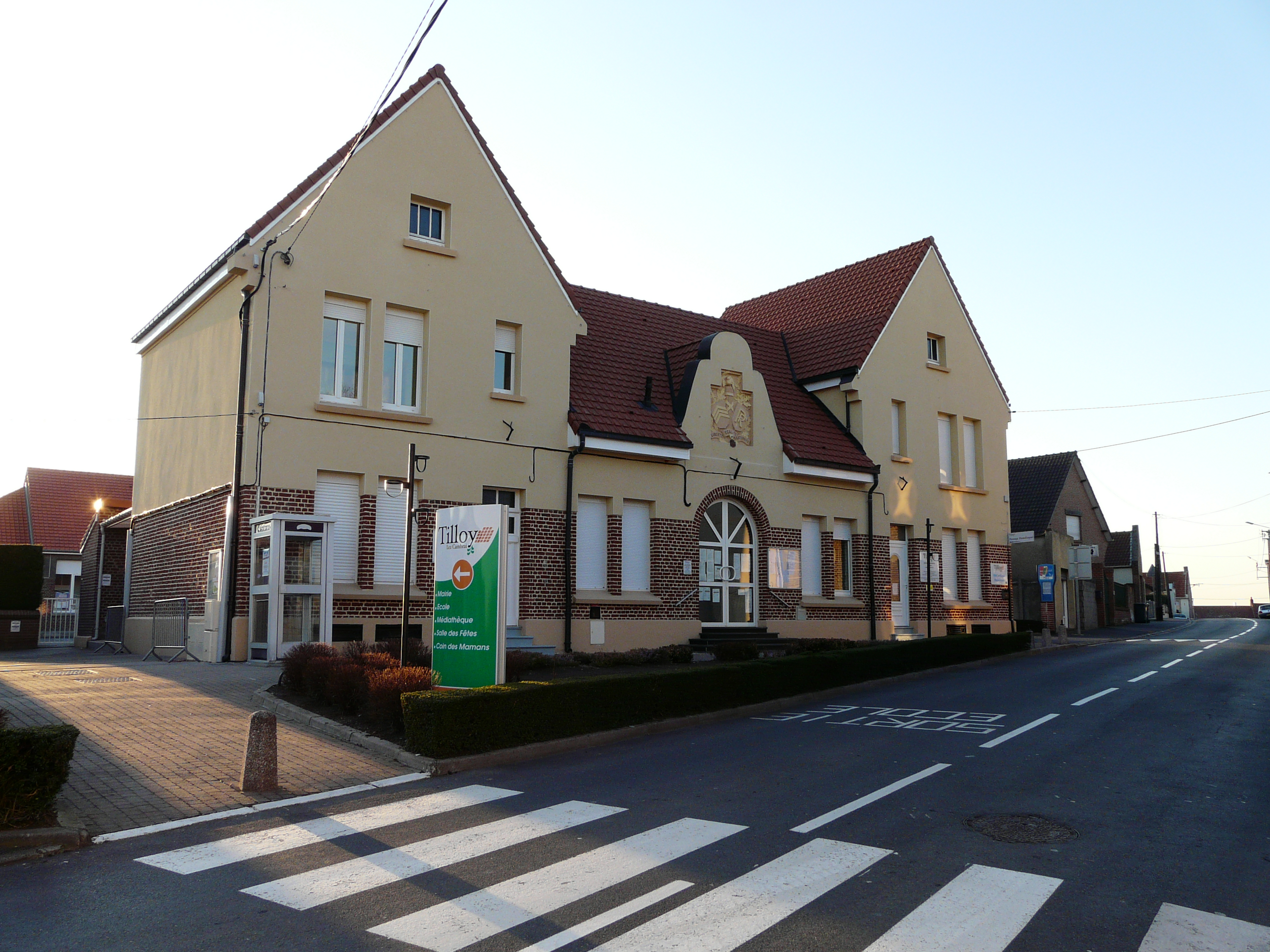
- The town hall in Tilloy-lez-Cambrai

- Coat of arms
- Location of Tilloy-lez-Cambrai
- Location within France Location within Hauts-de-France
- Coordinates: 50°11′46″N 3°13′18″E
- Country: France
- Region: Hauts-de-France
- Department: Nord
- Arrondissement: Cambrai
- Canton: Cambrai
- Intercommunality: CA Cambrai

Government
  - Mayor (2020–2026): Sonia Lancel Duthilleul
- Area^{1}: 3.32 km^{2} (1.28 sq mi)
- Elevation: 72 m (236 ft)
- Highest elevation: 81 m (266 ft)
- Lowest elevation: 49 m (161 ft)
- Population (2023): 695
  - Density: 209/km^{2} (542/sq mi)
- Time zone: UTC+01:00 (CET)
  - Summer (DST): UTC+02:00 (CEST)
- INSEE/Postal code: 59597 /59554
- ^{1} French Land Register data, which excludes lakes, ponds, glaciers > 1 km^{2} (0.386 sq mi or 247 acres) and river estuaries.

Tilloy-lez-Cambrai is a commune in the Nord department in northern France.

== Heraldry ==
Arms of Tilloy-lez-Cambrai	The arms of Tilloy-lez-Cambrai are blazoned : Or, 3 chevrons gules. (Ivry-la-Bataille, Lesdain, Saint-Aubert and Tilloy-lez-Cambrai use the same arms.)

== See also ==
- Communes of the Nord department
