= Saint-Aubert, Nord =

Saint-Aubert
- Commune
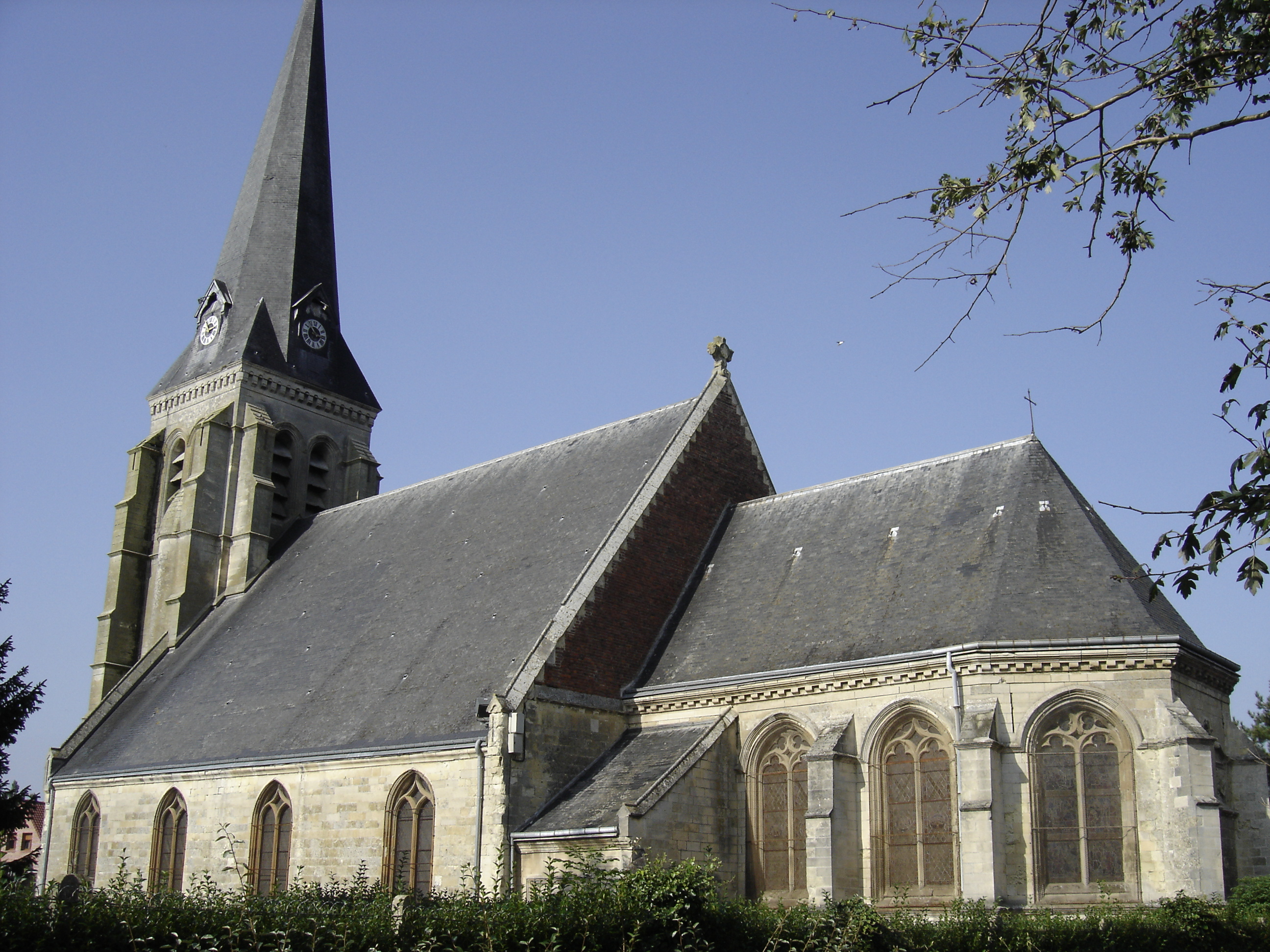
- The church in Saint-Aubert

- Coat of arms
- Location of Saint-Aubert
- Location within France Location within Hauts-de-France
- Coordinates: 50°12′30″N 3°25′02″E
- Country: France
- Region: Hauts-de-France
- Department: Nord
- Arrondissement: Cambrai
- Canton: Caudry
- Intercommunality: CA Caudrésis–Catésis

Government
  - Mayor (2020–2026): Pascal Gérard
- Area^{1}: 8.12 km^{2} (3.14 sq mi)
- Highest elevation: 97 m (318 ft)
- Lowest elevation: 58 m (190 ft)
- Population (2023): 1,570
  - Density: 193/km^{2} (501/sq mi)
- Time zone: UTC+01:00 (CET)
  - Summer (DST): UTC+02:00 (CEST)
- INSEE/Postal code: 59528 /59188
- ^{1} French Land Register data, which excludes lakes, ponds, glaciers > 1 km^{2} (0.386 sq mi or 247 acres) and river estuaries.

Saint-Aubert (French pronunciation: [sɛ̃t‿obɛʁ]) is a commune in the Nord department in northern France.

== History ==
Private A S Bullock in his World War I memoir recalls spending a night on the brick floor of an abandoned house in St Aubert on 24 October 1918, waking at 5 am to heavy artillery bombardment. He provides a dramatic description of the battle that ensued, with horses carrying guns into battle and men stripped to the waist 'working like demons loading the guns'. He recalled, 'the shells were falling so thick and at such speed that the flash of their bursting seemed to cover the hill with a sheet of fire. It was incredible that anything could survive there.'

== Heraldry ==
Arms of Saint-Aubert	The arms of Saint-Aubert are blazoned : Or, 3 chevrons gules. (Ivry-la-Bataille, Lesdain, Saint-Aubert and Tilloy-lez-Cambrai use the same arms.)

== See also ==
- Communes of the Nord department
