= Canton of Chevigny-Saint-Sauveur =

Administrative division in eastern France

Coordinates: 47.30°N 5.13°E

The canton of Chevigny-Saint-Sauveur is an administrative division of the Côte-d'Or department, eastern France. It was created at the French canton reorganisation which came into effect in March 2015. Its seat is in Chevigny-Saint-Sauveur.

It consists of the following communes:

1. Bressey-sur-Tille
2. Chevigny-Saint-Sauveur
3. Magny-sur-Tille
4. Neuilly-Crimolois
5. Quetigny
6. Sennecey-lès-Dijon
