= Gémonval coal mines =

French coal mines

Gémonval Coal Mines
- Founded: 1826
- Headquarters: France, Gémonval
- Production output: Bituminous coal, pyrite

The Gémonval coal mines are situated in eastern France, on the border between the departments of Haute-Saône and Doubs. The mines were operational for two distinct periods: the first between 1826 and 1847, following the granting of a concession, and the second in the 1940s by the Bureau of Geological and Geophysical Research (BRGG). These periods were interspersed with several attempts at revival. In the 1830s, the mine was subject to significant stock market speculation. The Gémonval keuper coal was used primarily for fueling boilers for concentrating brine from local saltworks, particularly at Mélecey, and for nearby forges. Additionally, the mines marketed pyrite from coal washing for the chemical industry.

At the beginning of the 21st century, vestiges of this activity, including mine entrances, spoil heaps, and ruins, still exist.

== Location ==
The various concessions in Haute-Saône for the exploitation of the Keuperian basin.

The Gémonval concession, encompassing 2,056 hectares, extends across the communes of Gémonval, Georfans, Courchaton, Vellechevreux, Marvelise, Saulnot, Crevans-et-la-Chapelle-lès-Granges, and Granges-le-Bourg. It is situated at the border of Haute-Saône and Doubs in the Bourgogne-Franche-Comté region.

The catchment area for the Gémonval coal mines encompasses the southern portion of the Lure arrondissement and the northern section of the Doubs region. The primary customers of the Gémonval mines are the saltworks, particularly that of Mélecey, local manufacturing facilities, and artisans in the region, most notably in Héricourt. The mines face direct competition from the Ronchamp mines and indirect competition from the Blanzy and Loire mines.

== Geology ==
The formation of the Keuper salt and coal deposit in Franche-Comté.

The coal and halite deposits that have been exploited are found within the Haute-Saône keuper coal basin, which is composed of alternating layers of sandstone, variegated marl, and gypsum dolomite. The Gémonval deposit is divided by a fault.

The quality of the coal at Gémonval is notably poor, with a sulfur content that is so high that it can ignite if left in piles for several weeks. The layer averages 0.80 meters in thickness. However, local mines are rich in gypsum, pyrite, rock salt, and iron ore.

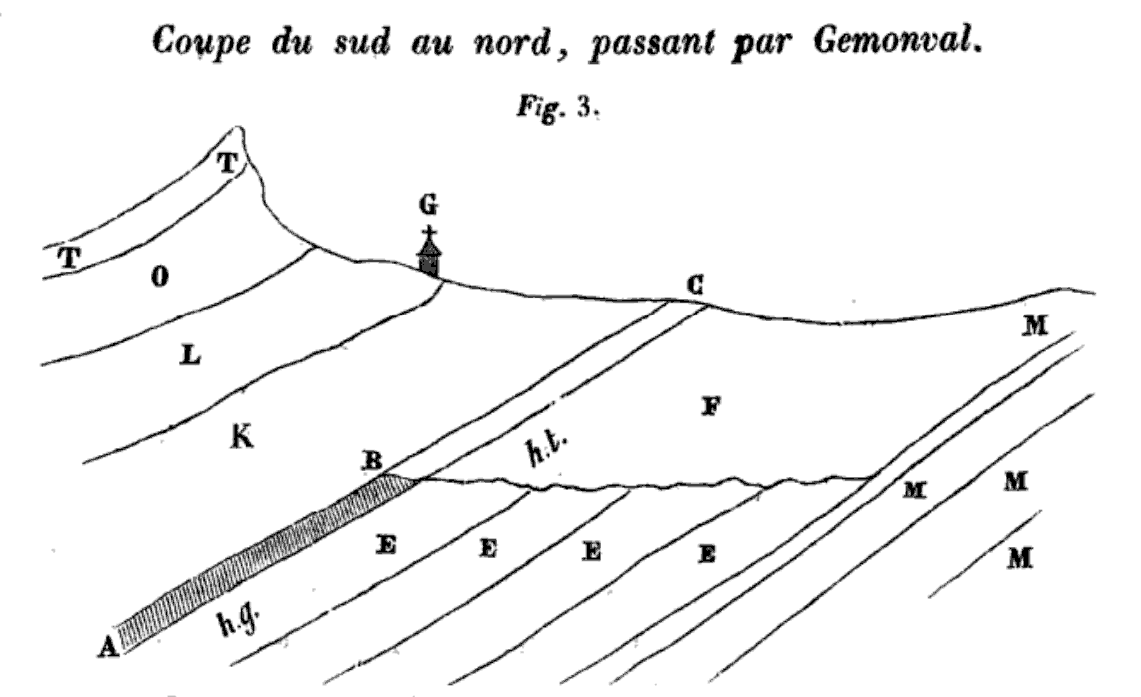
Geological section of Gémonval.
B-C: soft coal,
A-B (grey): gypsiferous coal.

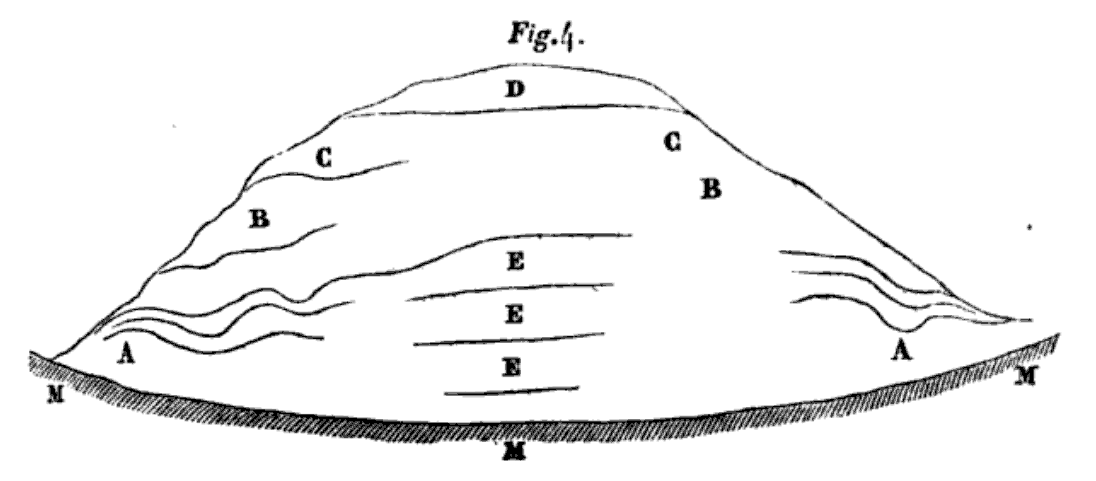
Gémonval gypsum hillock.

== History ==
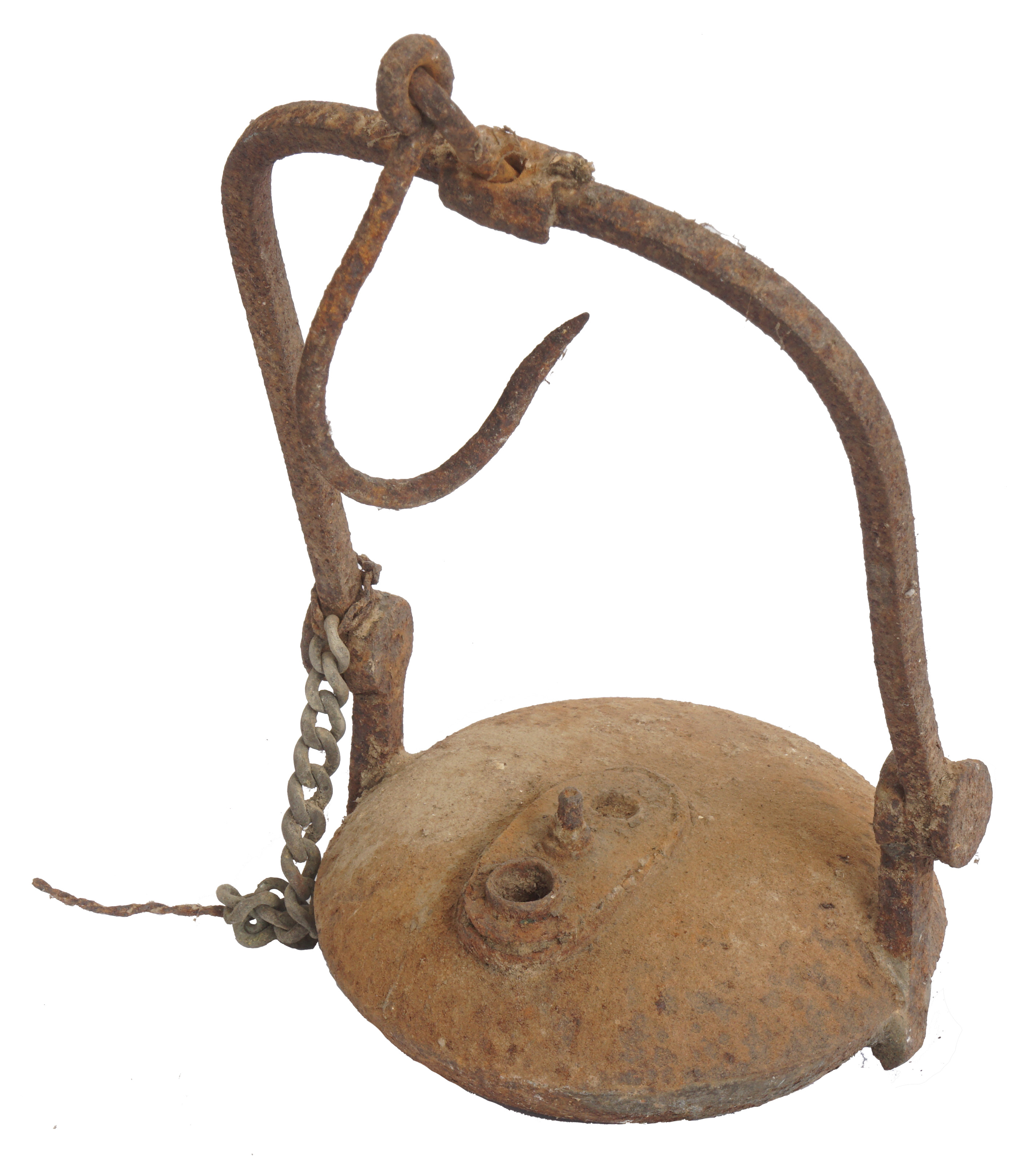
Gémonval miner's lamp.

=== First period of operation ===
The Gémonval concession was bestowed upon Samuel Blum, proprietor of the forges of Pont-sur-l'Ognon, by a royal ordinance on 8 October 1826. Blum used the coal directly for the operation of his factory.

In the 1830s, the operating company engaged in considerable stock market speculation regarding this mine. They asserted that they were exploiting two seams of coal, each one meter thick, of impeccable quality and continually announced discoveries. However, despite these claims, no profit was generated. To achieve a profit margin of 17 to 18%, production would have needed to reach 500 to 600 tons per day, which would have been equivalent to Alsace's consumption at that time. However, production never exceeded 20 tons per day. At that time, eight shafts were in operation, and two steam engines were in service.

In 1832, several exploratory shafts were dug in the municipality of Vellechevreux. The majority of these shafts identified multiple coal seams, including a first seam of 10 cm of carbonaceous shale, a second of 46 cm of high-quality coal, a third of 61 cm of coal intermingled with shale, and a fourth of an unidentified composition. On 18 August of the same year, a shaft measuring 19.5 meters in depth was excavated in Courchaton. This was part of a group of three exploratory shafts dug by the Gémonval mines in the area. On 10 November 1833, the thickness of the seam encountered exhibited variability, ranging from 5 to 10 cm, as the galleries were excavated. Two additional boreholes and two shafts were constructed in the same area. By 1842, the company, owned by Boisson Faucompré & Co., employed a workforce of 72 individuals, used two steam engines, and employed two winding machines.

The mines were initially subjected to closure in 1847.

=== Abandonment and research period ===
From 1850 to 1905, many unsuccessful attempts were made to revive the project. In 1850, a drilling operation discovered coal at a depth of 90 meters. By 1866, the concession had been acquired by Mr. Lorain of Dijon. The concession was formally relinquished on 10 December 1878.

In approximately 1880, two drilling operations were conducted, followed by another by Gouhenans saltworks in July 1905, which identified the presence of coal at depths ranging from 81.25 to 81.80 meters.

=== Second period of operation ===
In response to wartime shortages, the BRGG conducted new searches between 1942 and 1944, circumventing occupant quotas. The Vy-lès-Lure concession was reopened, but the Corcelles concession was not.

In the 1940s, the staff included a mining engineer, a clerk, a domestic worker, a master miner, three miners, five rollers, four laborers, two machinists, two firemen, a carpenter, and a blacksmith with an assistant, and seven washers (two for coal, five for pyrite). The coal was sorted and underwent a series of washes to separate pyrite, which was subsequently used by a chemical company, "La Chemiquerie." For each hectoliter of raw product, the washing process yielded 70 liters of washed coal for local sale, 7 kg of pyrite, and 13 liters of small coal for steam engines.

The issue of water infiltration has been a persistent challenge at Gémonval. At the Fourneau shaft, the volume of water infiltration ranges from 150 cubic meters per day during the summer months to 200 m^{3} per day during the winter. The water is managed through an 8 m^{3} reservoir carved into the gypsum. The water is then brought to the surface by a plunger pump powered by a single-action, direct-drive steam engine, capable of lifting up to 85 liters per piston stroke and 500 m^{3} per day.

== Operations ==
=== Houillère shaft ===
47°32′18″N 6°34′57″E

The Houillère shaft represents a primary component of the concessionary infrastructure, with a network of associated numbered shafts and drills in its immediate vicinity. It is connected to the Essarts and Fourneau shafts. In the early 21st century, a substantial spoil heap remains visible at the site.

The Houillère well slag heap.

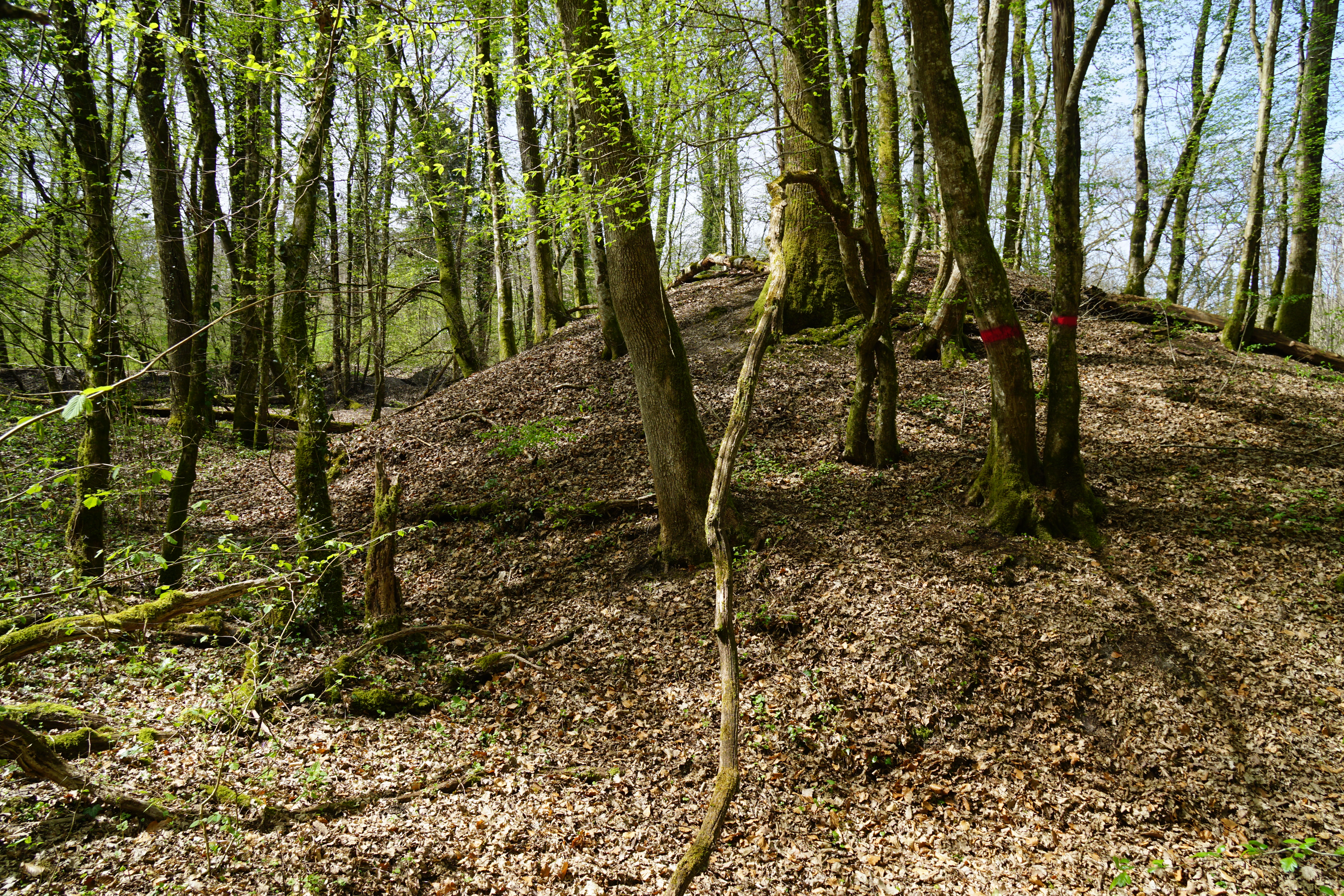

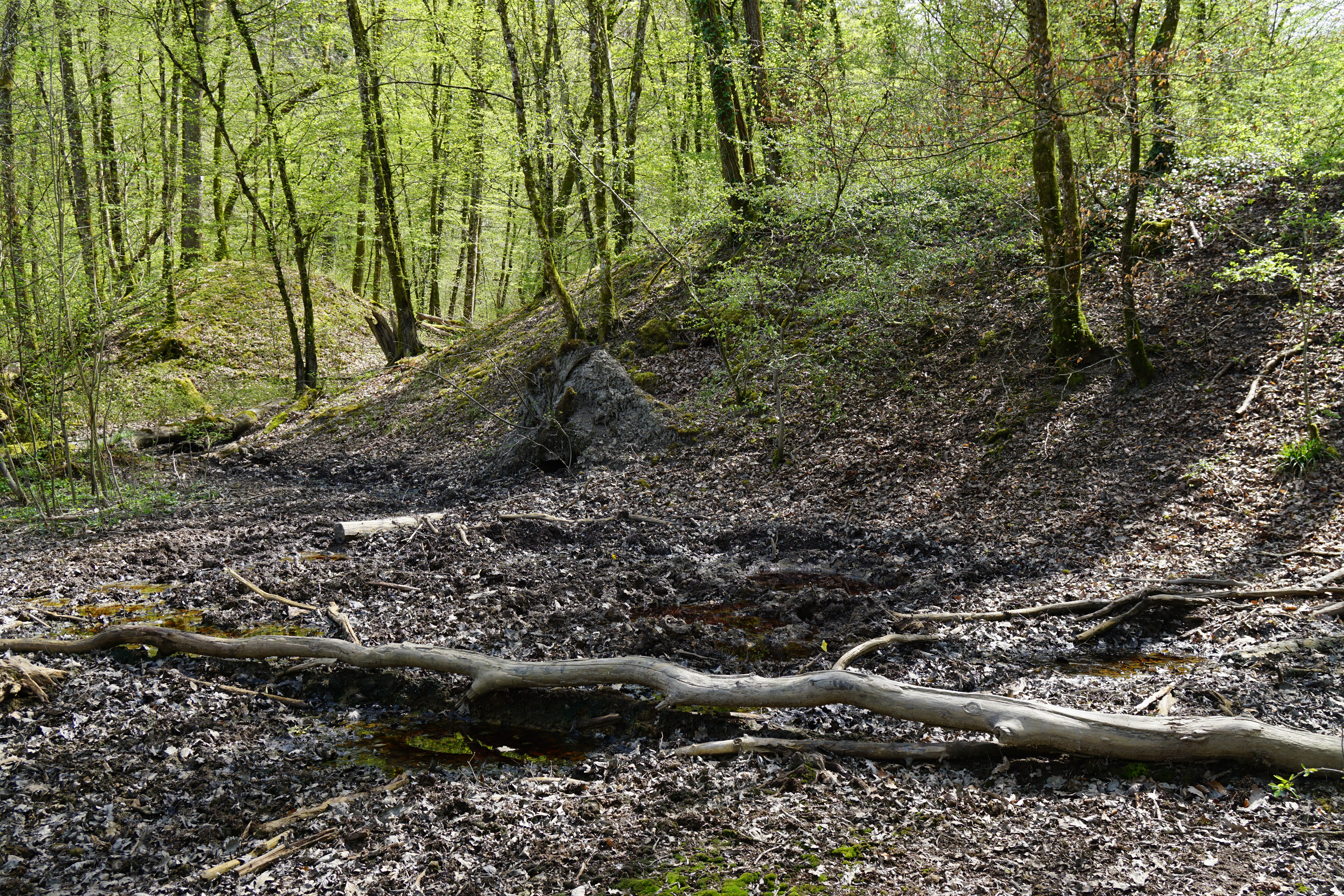

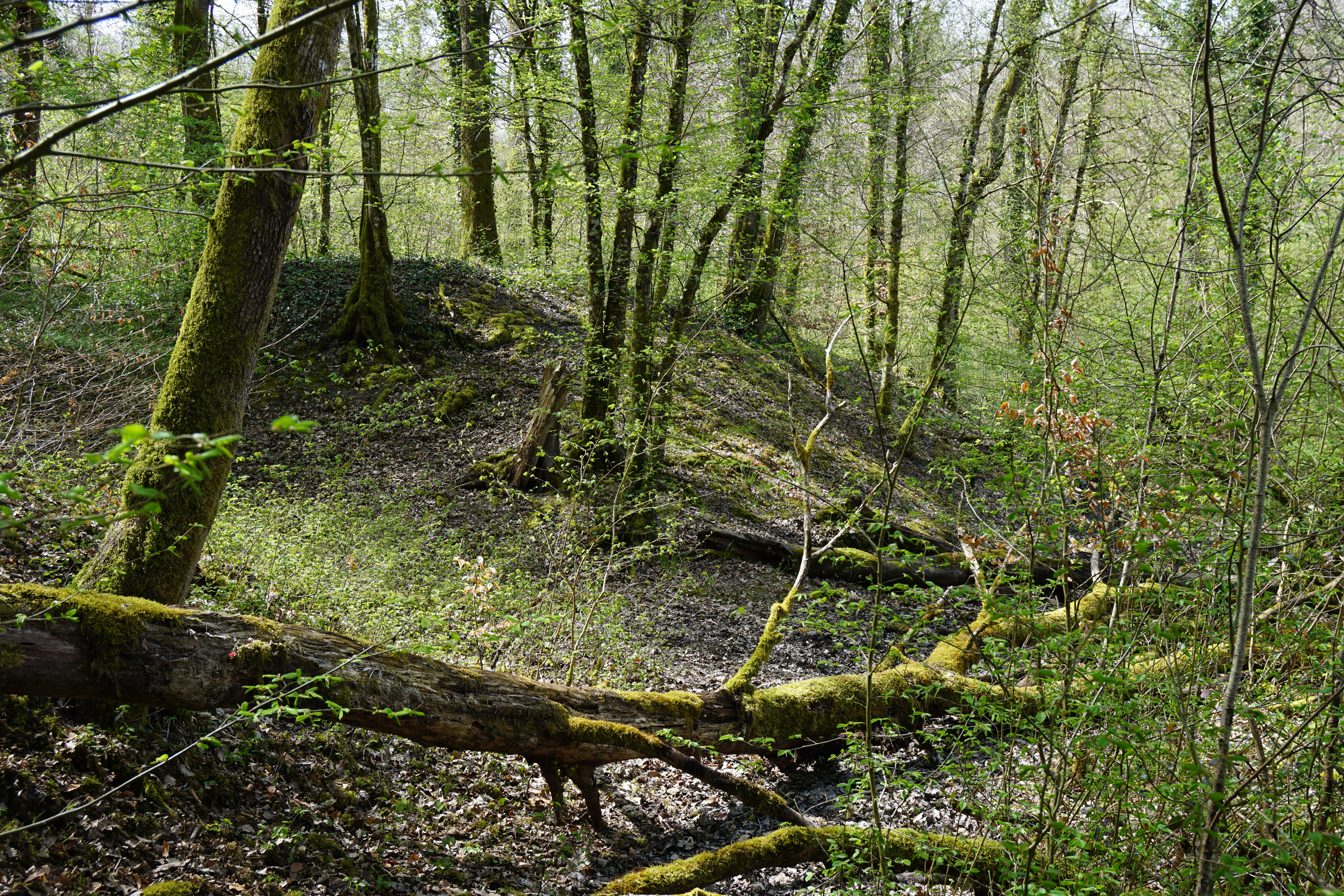

=== Shaft No. 1 ===
In 1834, the initial excavation, designated Shaft No. 1, encountered a layer of considerable thickness, measuring one meter in width, at a depth of 60.60 meters.

=== Shaft No. 2 ===
In 1833, Shaft No. 2 encountered a 0.55-meter layer at a depth of 15 meters.

=== Shaft No. 3 ===
In 1835, Shaft No. 3 encountered a 0.40-meter-thick layer of soft, non-sticky coal at a depth of 21.60 meters. This was followed by the deepening of the shaft to reach a gypsum layer at 30 meters. Subsequently, a rising crosscut was dug, which intersected a water source upon exiting the gypsum.

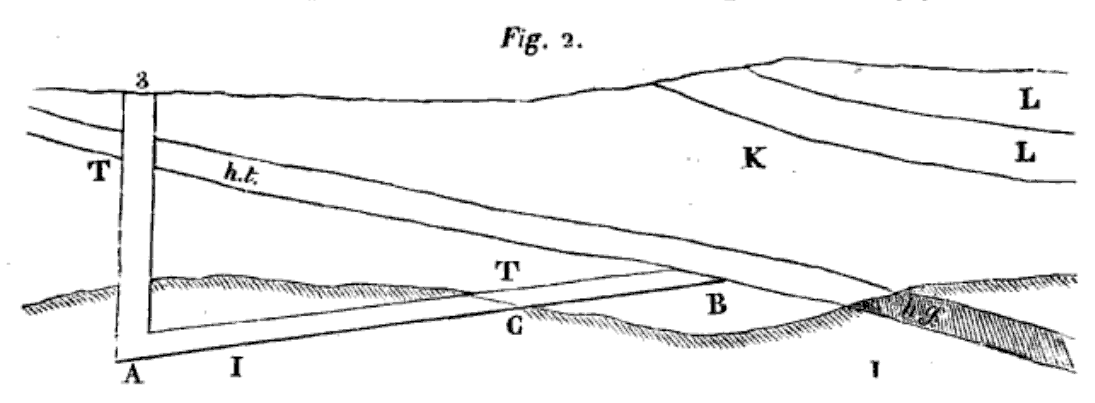
Geological section of Gémonval No. 3 shaft. h.t. soft coal, h.g. (gray): gypsum coal

=== Shaft No. 4 ===
In 1834, Shaft No. 4 reached a one-meter layer at 60.60 meters. The coal was found to be lean, non-sticky, shaly, and pyritic.

=== Époisses Shaft ===
The shaft, measuring 28 meters in length, is believed to have been constructed in 1855.

=== Moulin Gallery ===
The 130-meter Moulin Gallery extends in a westerly direction until it reaches the Houillère shaft.

=== Essarts Shaft ===
47°32′07″N 6°35′27″E

Situated on the Gémonval-Crevans road, it was the sole operational shaft in 1854. Coal was extracted at a depth of 37 meters and transported via a nearby stream. By 1943, debris had accumulated along the stream, and a partially destroyed shaft building remained.

The remains of the spoil heap and steam engine are still visible in the early 21st century.

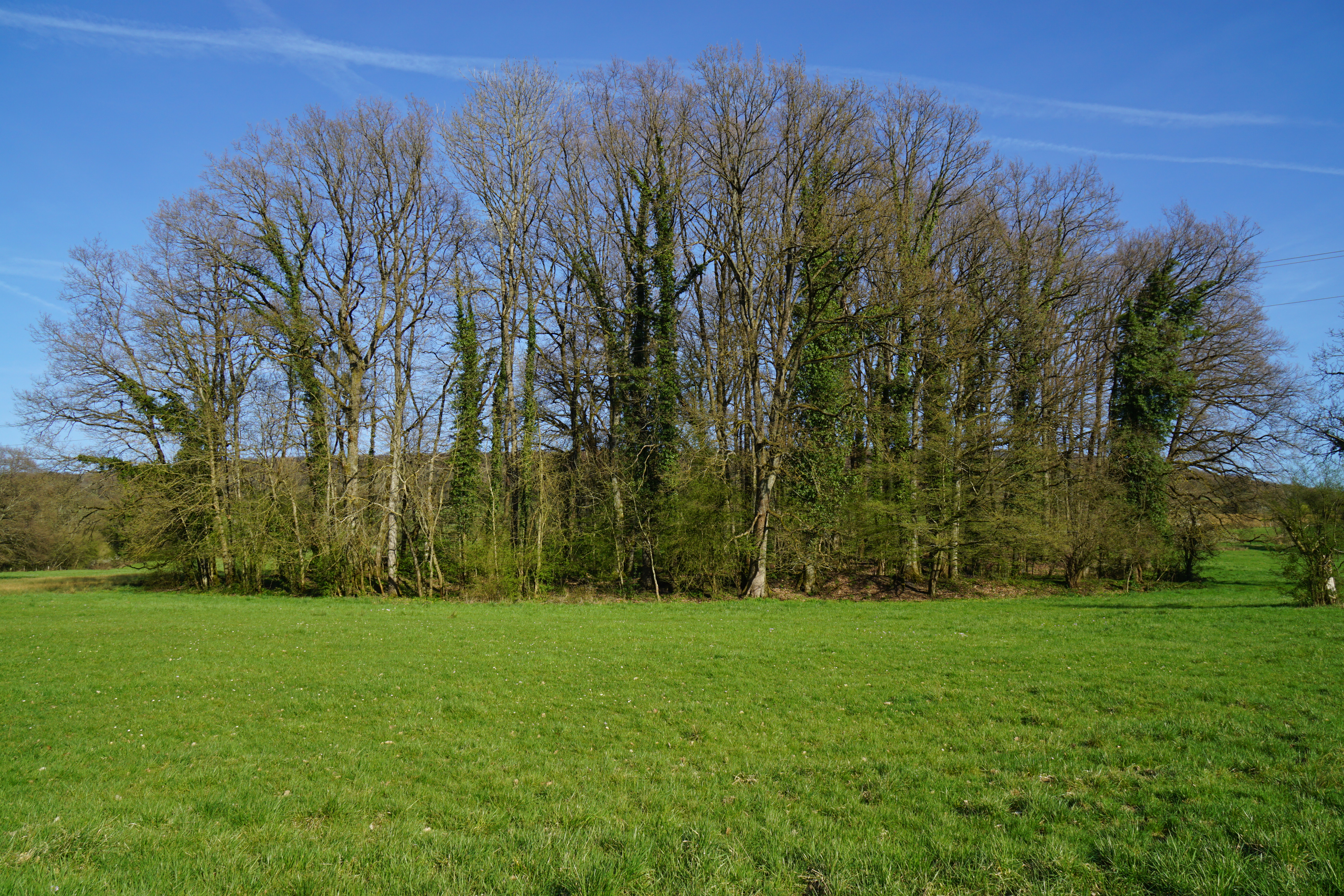
General view of the slag heap.

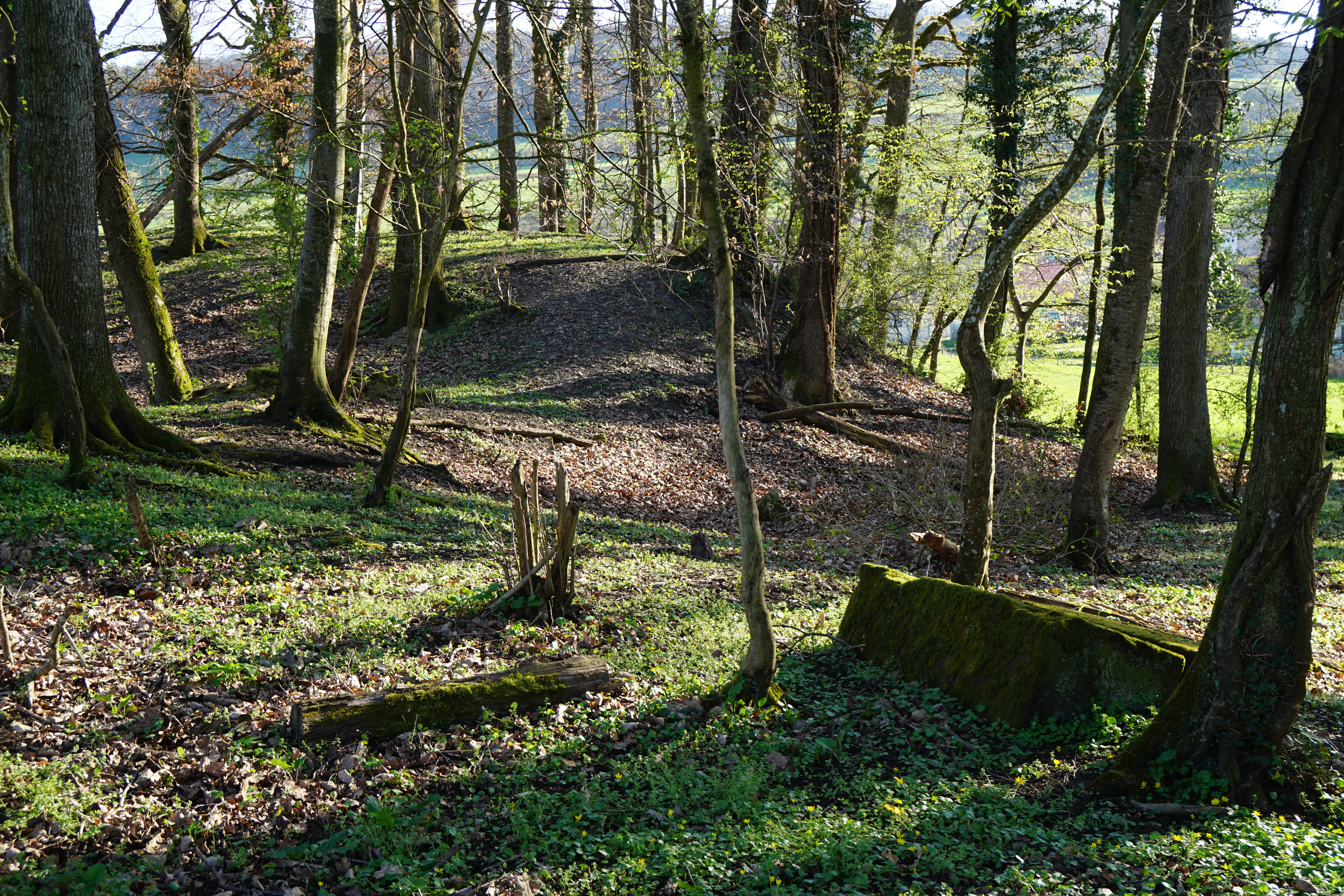
Terril du puits des Essarts.

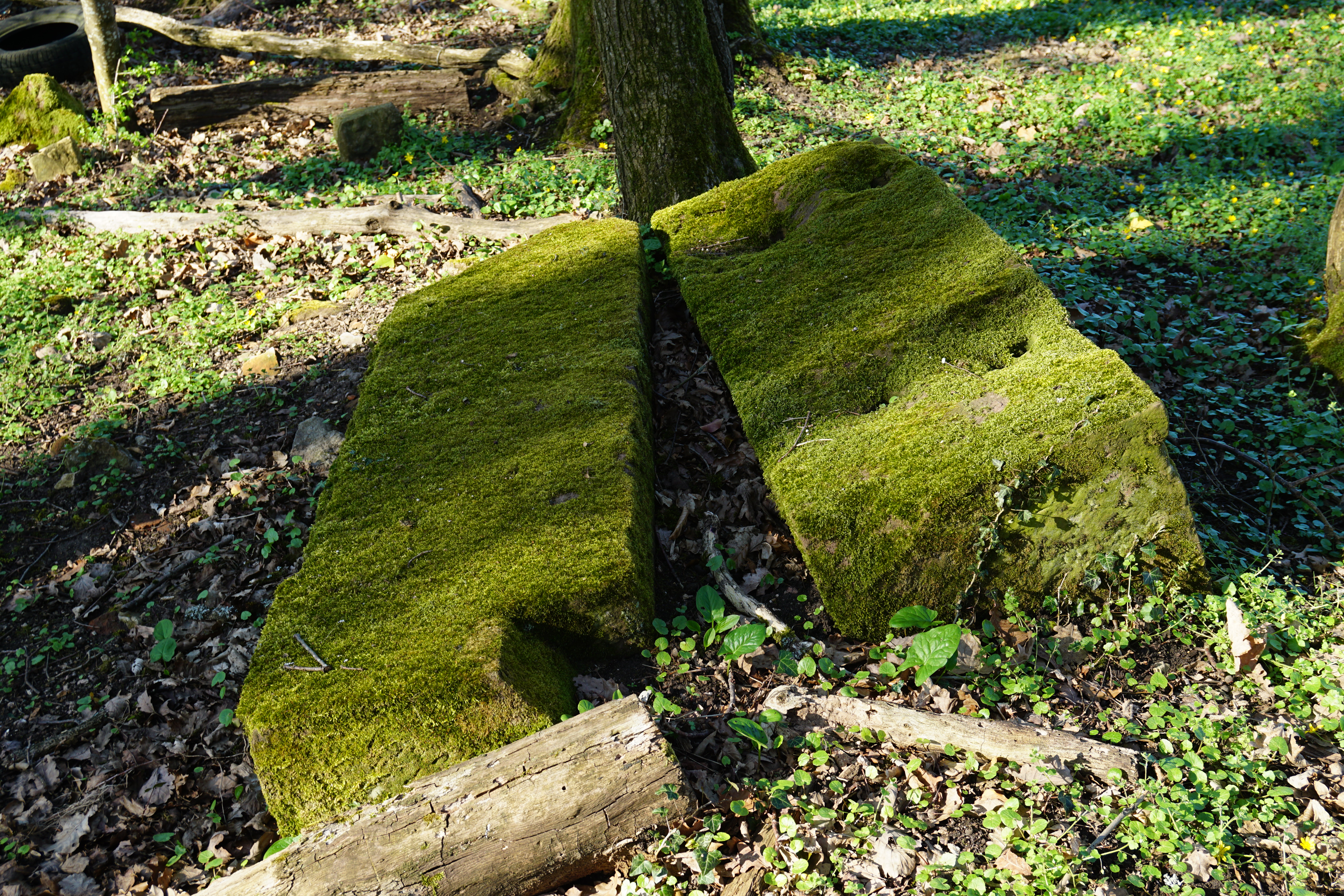
Steam engine supports.

=== Fourneau shaft ===
A 0.80-meter layer was encountered at a depth of 40 meters in the fourneau shaft. The presence of a mining building, spoil heap, and gallery entrance within a radius of 100 meters indicates that the shaft was still operational in 1944, with three work sites in operation at that time.

=== Isaac shaft ===
Isaac shaft was backfilled before 1943 without leaving debris.

=== Elizabeth shaft ===
47°32′19″N 6°35′49″E

The Elizabeth Shaft is 70 meters deep, with the presence of a spoil heap and a sinkhole serving to demarcate its location in the early 21st century.

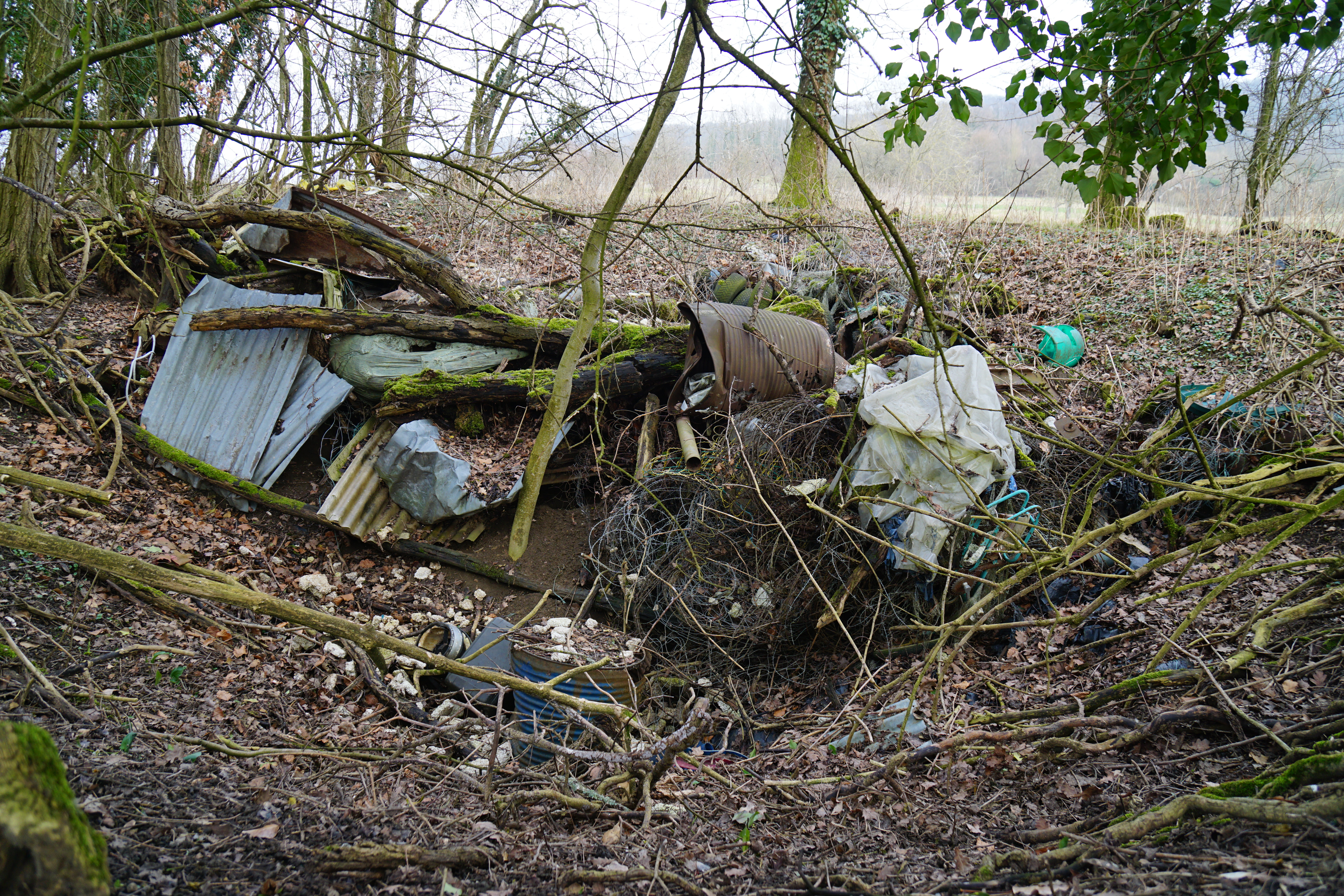
Old Elisabeth well in the hamlet of La Chapelle.

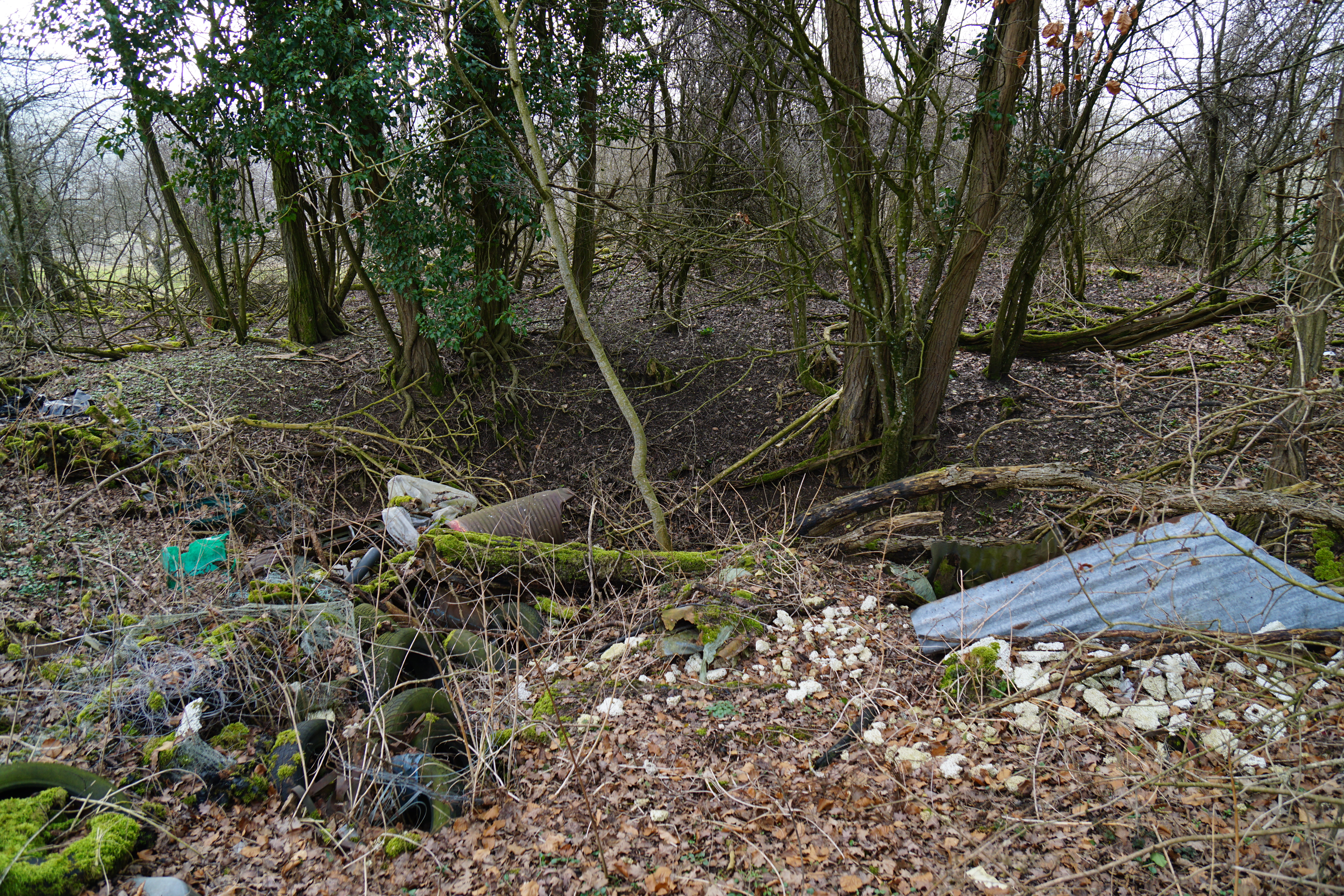
Another view.

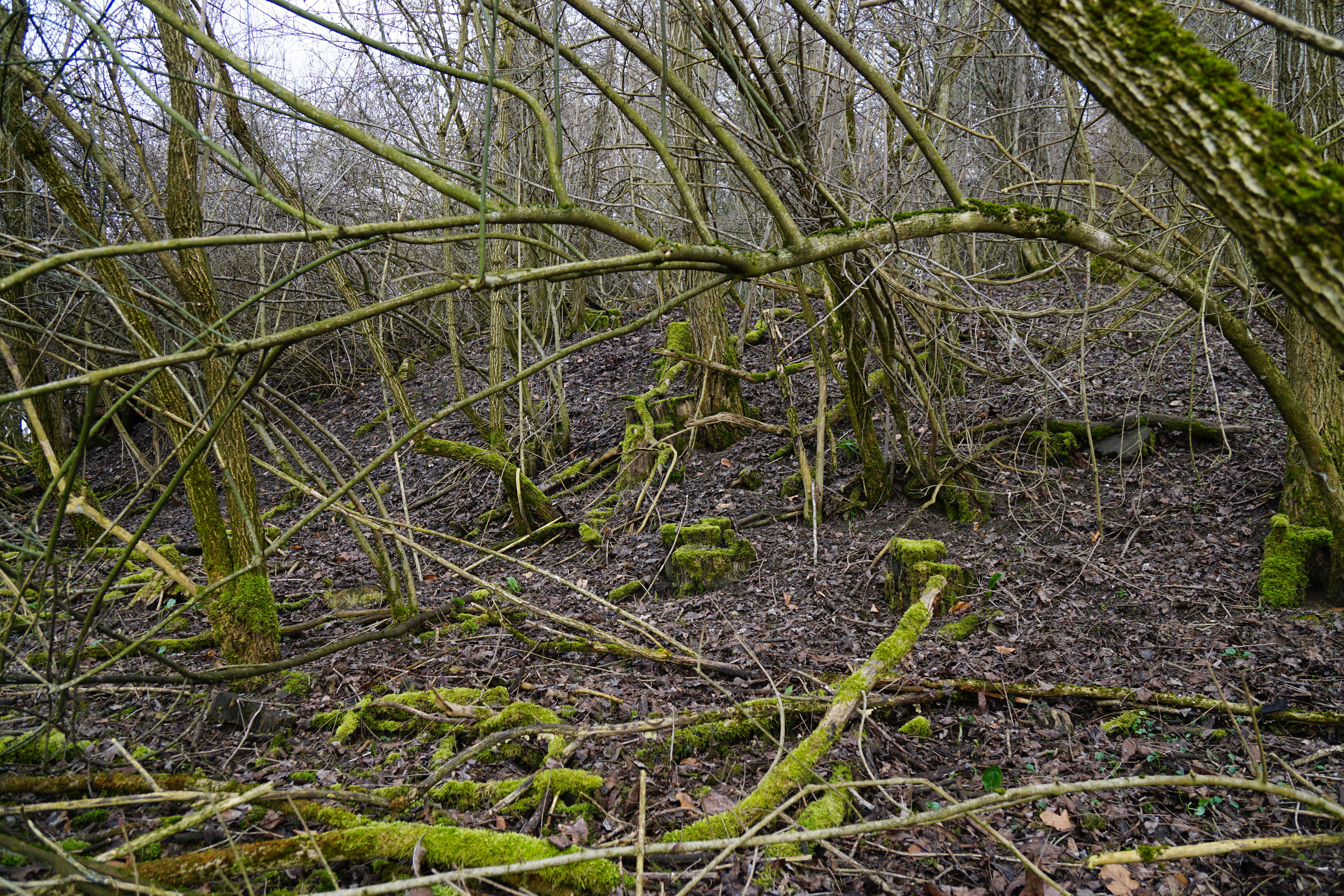
Its slag heap.

== Production ==
The use of coal extracted from the various concessions by the saltworks.

The Gémonval operation is subdivided into two distinct work compartments, separated by a fault.

- The West compartment extracted 135,000 cubic meters of coal across 11 hectares at an average depth of 30 meters, encompassing Shafts No. 1-5, Essarts Shaft, and Moulin Gallery.
- The eastern compartment extracted 10,000 cubic meters of material across 1.5 hectares at an average depth of 50 meters, including the Isaac, Fourneau, and Elizabeth Shafts.

The Houillère shaft is the sole mine that traverses both compartments.

In 1838, 600 tons of low-ash coal from the Corcelles and Gémonval concessions were consumed in the Doubs region.

The mean annual production volume for the mid-19th century was 8,000 m^{3}.

Evolution of coal mining at the Gémonval collieries
	1832	1849	1851	1853	1854
Production (approximate) in tonnes	1,065	1,200	610	2,000	1,250

== See also ==
- Gémonval
- Haute-Saône Keuperian coalfield

== Bibliography ==
- Malot, Charles (1838). La France industrielle, manufacturière, agricole et commerciale [Industrial, manufacturing, agricultural and commercial France] (in French). Imprimerie H. Fournier et Comp. pp. 355–356. Archived from the original on 12 January 2018.
- Laurens, Paul (1841). Annuaire départemental du Doubs [Doubs departmental directory] (in French). pp. 129–131. Archived from the original on 3 September 2024.
- Laurens, Paul (1843). Annuaire départemental du Doubs [Doubs departmental directory] (in French). p. 247. Archived from the original on 12 January 2018.
- Ebelman (1855). Recueil des travaux scientifiques de M. Ebelman [Collection of scientific works by M. Ebelman] (in French). Vol. 2. pp. 83–91. Archived from the original on 13 January 2018.
- Resal, Henri-Amé (1864). Statistique géologique, minéralogique et minéralurgique des départements du Doubs et du Jura [Geological, mineralogical and mineralurgical statistics for the Doubs and Jura departments] (in French). pp. 84–87. Archived from the original on 22 July 2018.
- Société d'Émulation de Montbéliard (1866). Mémoires de la Société d'Émulation de Montbéliard [Memoirs of the Société d'Émulation de Montbéliard] (in French). Vol. 3. Henri Barbier. p. 425. Archived from the original on 13 January 2018.
- Thirria, Édouard (1869). Manuel à l'usage de l'habitant du département de la Haute-Saône [Manual for residents of the Haute-Saône département] (in French). pp. 182–186. Archived from the original on 5 April 2023.
- Dormois, R; Ricours, J (1943). Houille triasique sur le versant N.O. du Jura [Houille triasique sur le versant N.O. du Jura] (PDF) (in French). BRGM. Archived from the original (PDF) on 3 September 2024.
- Ricours, J (1944). Etude géologique du bassin de Gémonval [Geological study of the Gémonval basin] (PDF) (in French). BRGM. Archived from the original (PDF) on 3 September 2024.
- Trebuck, S (2013). Étude détaillée des aléas et mouvements de terrain du district minier de Gémonval et Le Vernoy (25) [Detailed study of hazards and ground movements in the Gémonval and Le Vernoy mining district (25)] (in French). Géoderis.
