= Belles-Fontaines =

- Commune
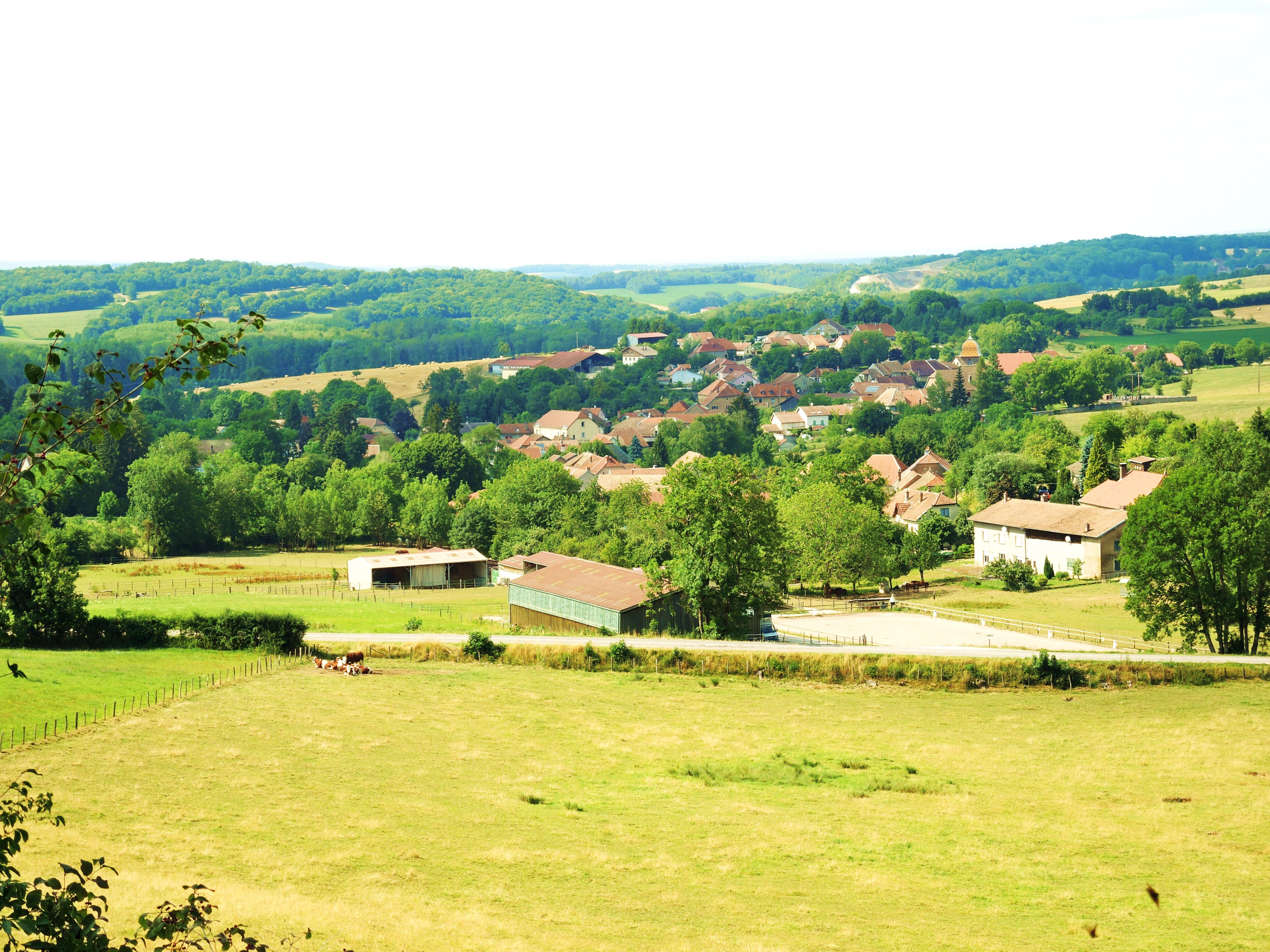
- Courchaton
- Location of Belles-Fontaines
- Location within France Location within Bourgogne-Franche-Comté
- Coordinates: 47°30′59″N 6°32′25″E
- Country: France
- Region: Bourgogne-Franche-Comté
- Department: Haute-Saône
- Arrondissement: Lure
- Canton: Villersexel
- Area^{1}: 25.66 km^{2} (9.91 sq mi)
- Population (2023): 600
  - Density: 23/km^{2} (61/sq mi)
- Time zone: UTC+01:00 (CET)
  - Summer (DST): UTC+02:00 (CEST)
- INSEE/Postal code: 70180 /70110
- ^{1} French Land Register data, which excludes lakes, ponds, glaciers > 1 km^{2} (0.386 sq mi or 247 acres) and river estuaries.

Belles-Fontaines (French pronunciation: [bɛl fɔ̃tɛn], lit. 'Beautiful Fountains') is a commune in the Haute-Saône department in the region of Bourgogne-Franche-Comté in eastern France. It was established on 1 January 2025, with the merger of the communes of Courchaton, Georfans and Vellechevreux-et-Courbenans. Its seat is Courchaton.

== See also ==
- Communes of the Haute-Saône department
