= Gémonval =

- Commune
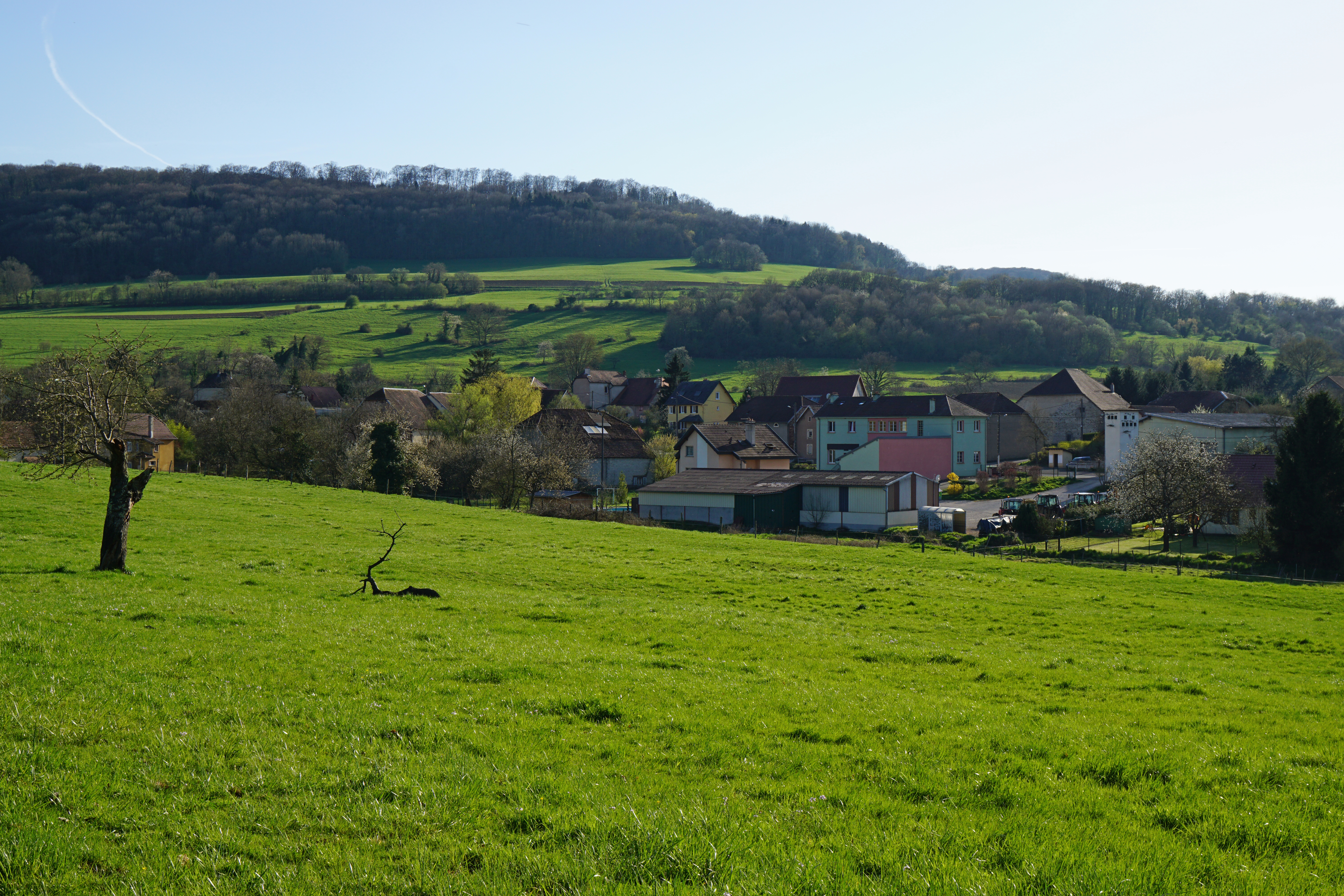
- A general view of Gémonval
- Location of Gémonval
- Location within France Location within Bourgogne-Franche-Comté
- Coordinates: 47°31′59″N 6°35′21″E
- Country: France
- Region: Bourgogne-Franche-Comté
- Department: Doubs
- Arrondissement: Montbéliard
- Canton: Bavans

Government
  - Mayor (2020–2026): Fabrice Vrillacq
- Area^{1}: 3.39 km^{2} (1.31 sq mi)
- Highest elevation: 513 m (1,683 ft)
- Lowest elevation: 305 m (1,001 ft)
- Population (2023): 81
  - Density: 24/km^{2} (62/sq mi)
- Time zone: UTC+01:00 (CET)
  - Summer (DST): UTC+02:00 (CEST)
- INSEE/Postal code: 25264 /25250
- ^{1} French Land Register data, which excludes lakes, ponds, glaciers > 1 km^{2} (0.386 sq mi or 247 acres) and river estuaries.

Gémonval (French pronunciation: [ʒemɔ̃val]) is a commune in the Doubs department in the Bourgogne-Franche-Comté region in eastern France.

Coal mines were operated in the village between 1826 and 1944.

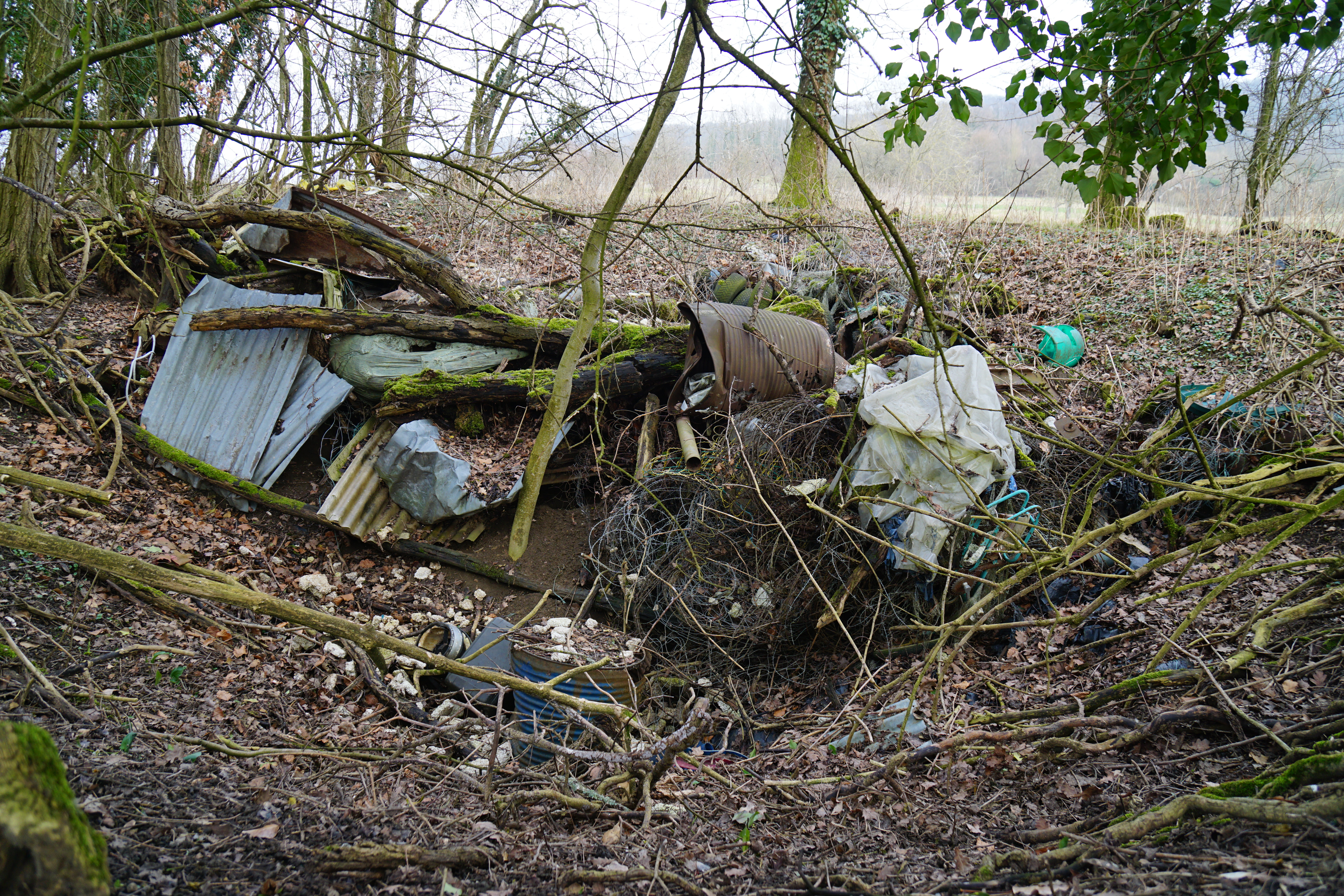
Mine shaft of Elisabeth.

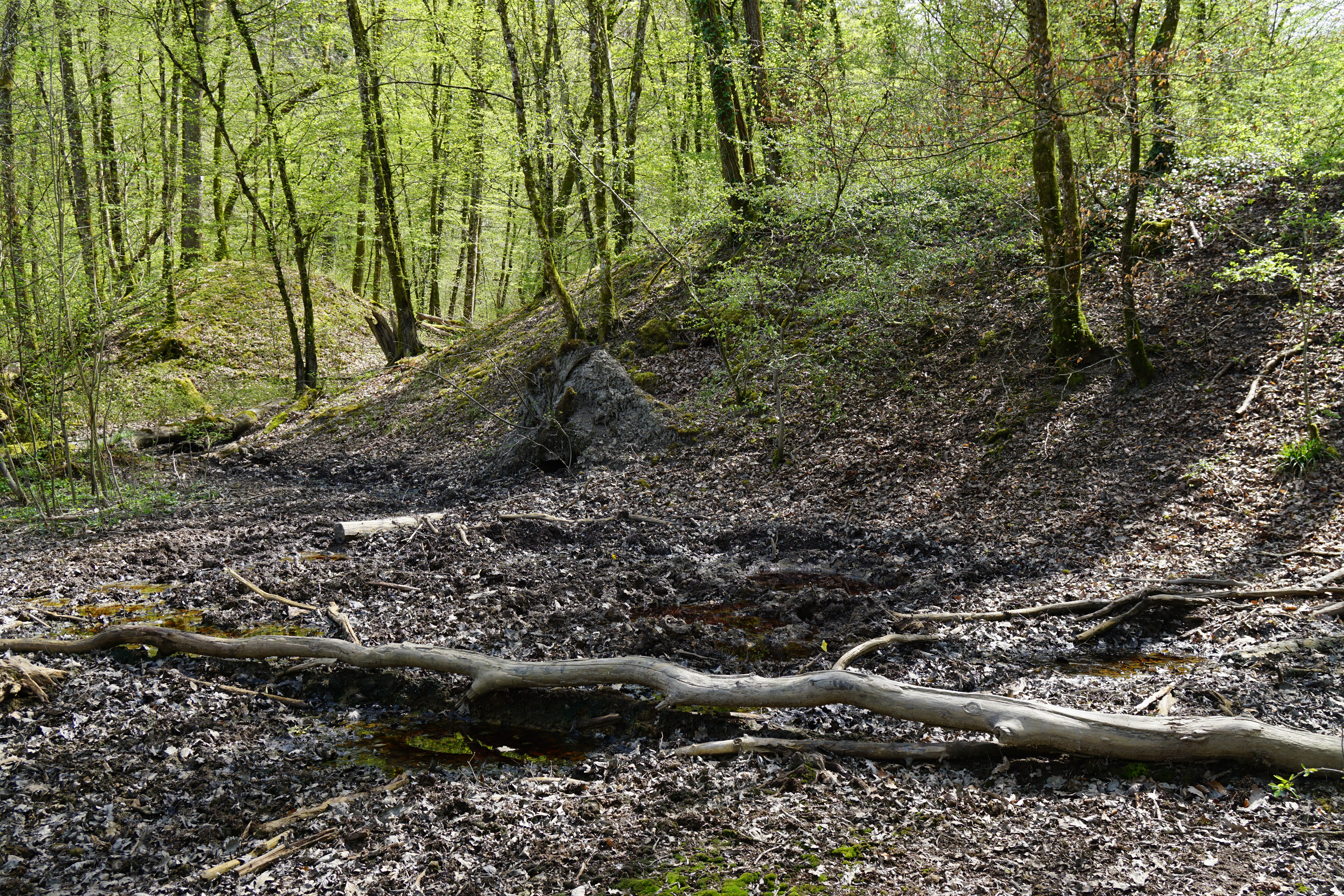
Mine shaft de la Houillère.

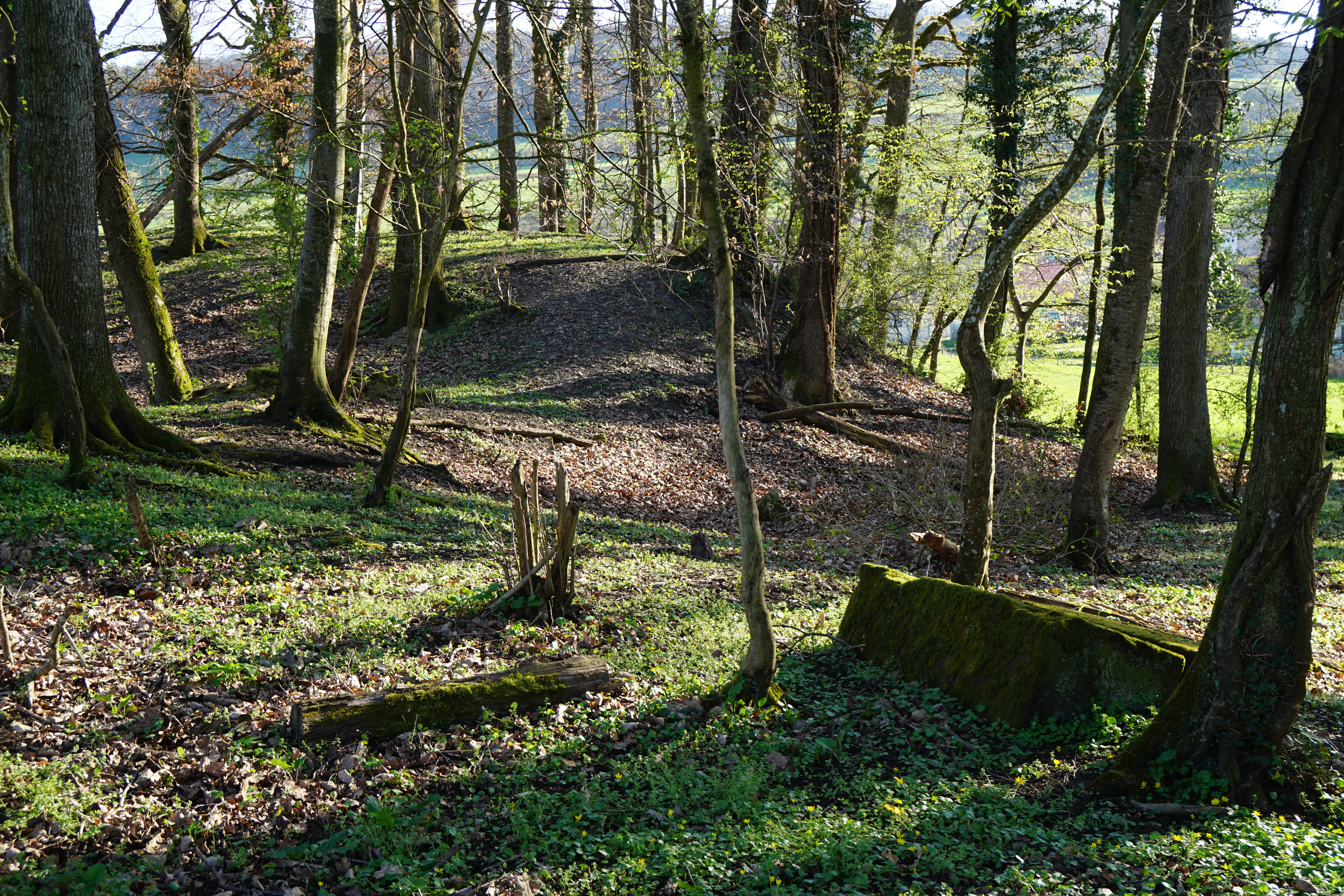
Mine shaft des Essarts.

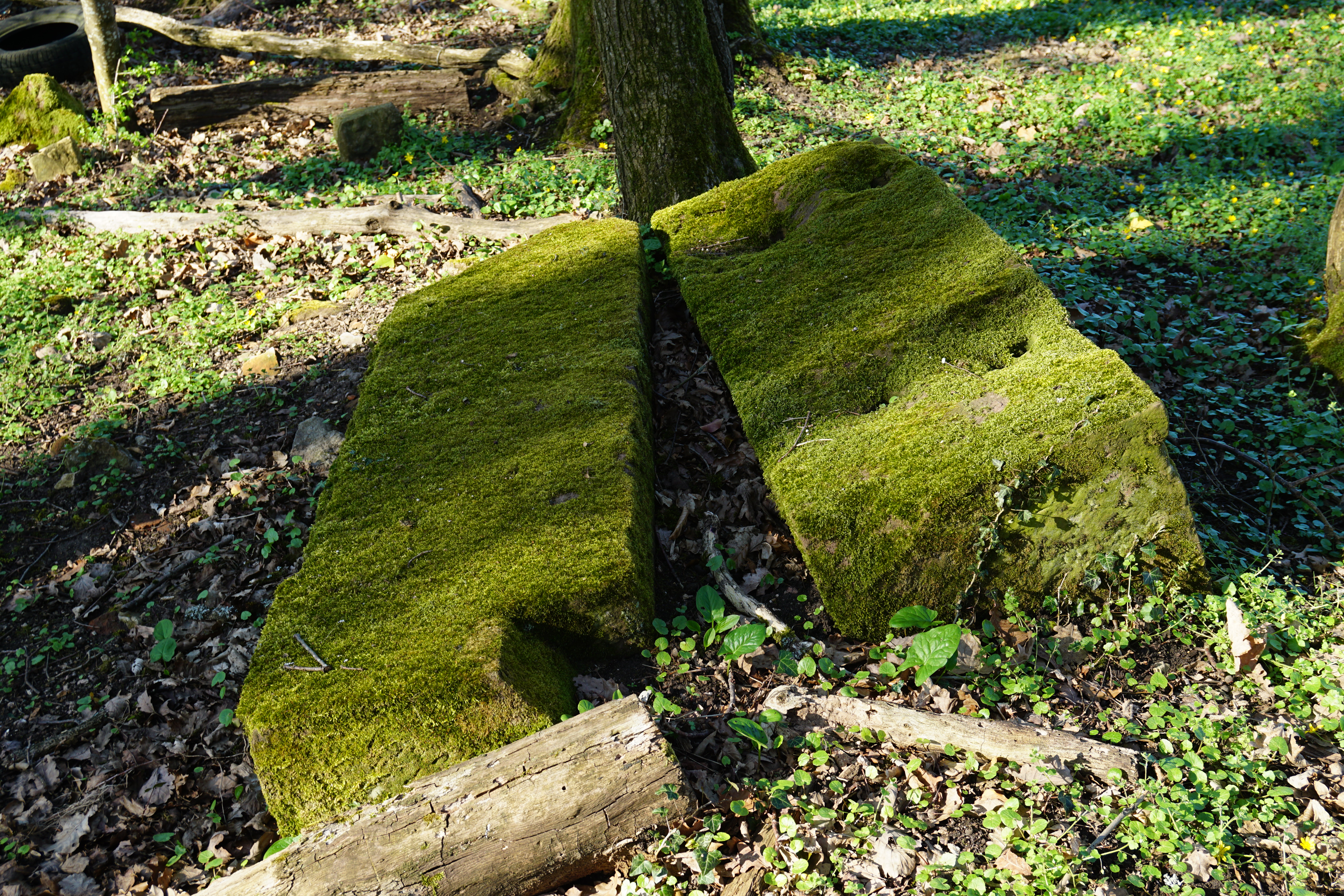
Plinth of steam machine in mine shaft des Essarts.
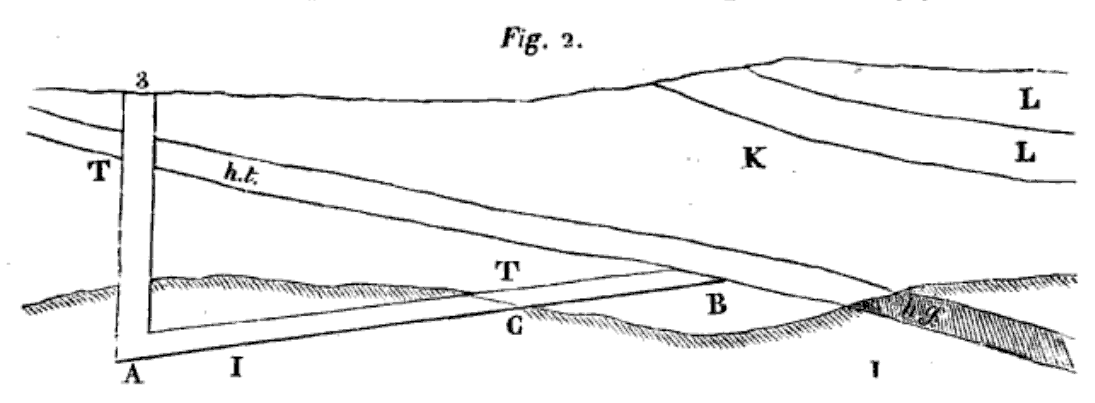
A sectional view of the mine-schaft #3.
ht : "houille tendre" (coal),
hg (gray) : "houille gypseuse" (coal).

== Population ==
Historical population
Year	Pop.	±% p.a.
92	1,975	—
75	1,982	+0.02%
86	1,990	+0.04%
100	1,999	+0.03%
75	2,007	+0.02%
91	2,012	+0.02%
77	2,017	+0.02%
85	2,023	+0.04%
81		—
Source: INSEE

== See also ==
- Communes of the Doubs department
- Gémonval coal mines
