= Crevans-et-la-Chapelle-lès-Granges =

- Commune
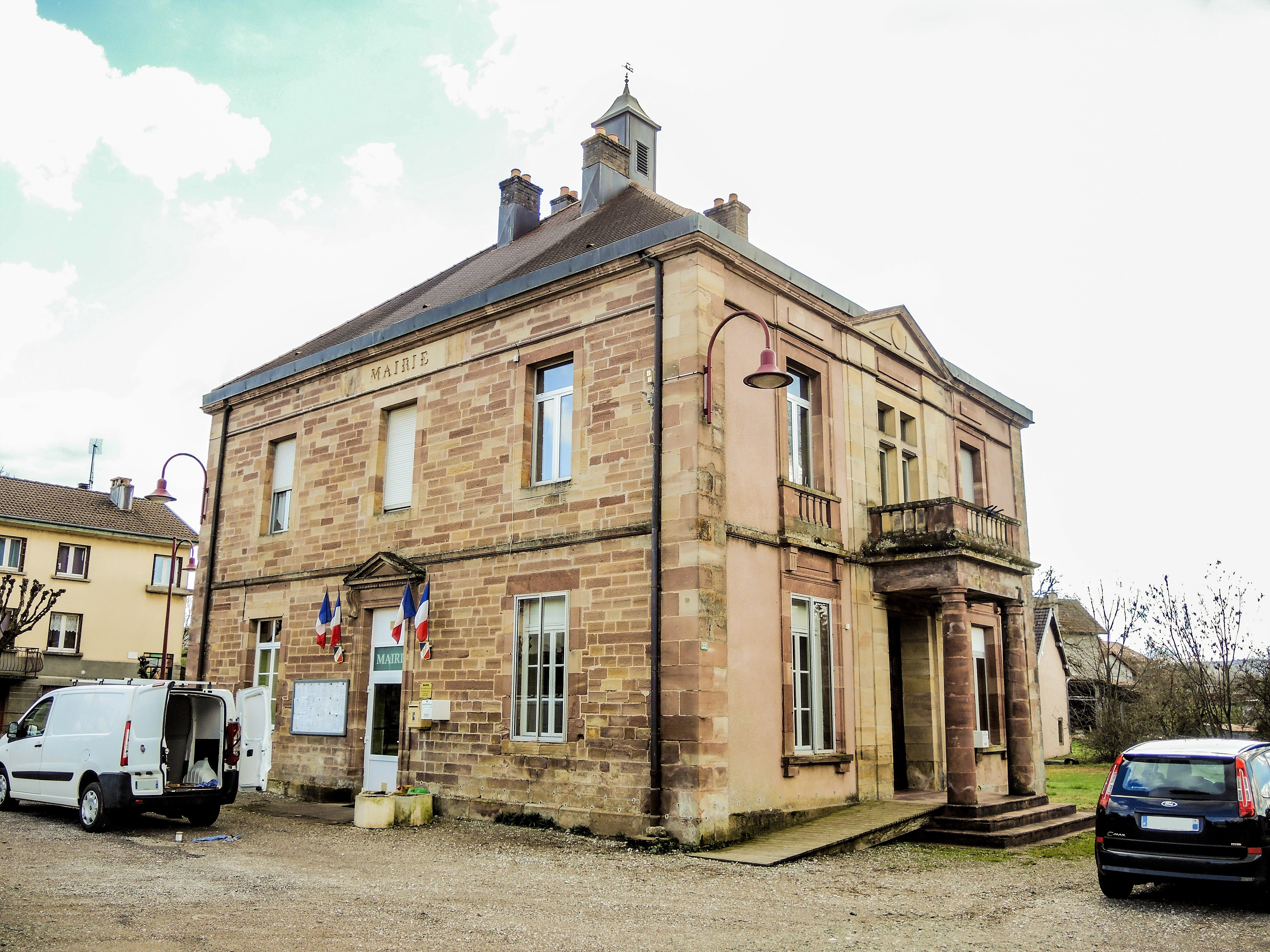
- The town hall in Crevans

- Coat of arms
- Location of Crevans-et-la-Chapelle-lès-Granges
- Location within France Location within Bourgogne-Franche-Comté
- Coordinates: 47°33′10″N 6°35′10″E
- Country: France
- Region: Bourgogne-Franche-Comté
- Department: Haute-Saône
- Arrondissement: Lure
- Canton: Villersexel
- Area^{1}: 3.91 km^{2} (1.51 sq mi)
- Highest elevation: 473 m (1,552 ft)
- Lowest elevation: 299 m (981 ft)
- Population (2023): 248
  - Density: 63.4/km^{2} (164/sq mi)
- Time zone: UTC+01:00 (CET)
  - Summer (DST): UTC+02:00 (CEST)
- INSEE/Postal code: 70187 /70400
- ^{1} French Land Register data, which excludes lakes, ponds, glaciers > 1 km^{2} (0.386 sq mi or 247 acres) and river estuaries.

Crevans-et-la-Chapelle-lès-Granges is a commune in the Haute-Saône department in the region of Bourgogne-Franche-Comté in eastern France.

== See also ==
- Communes of the Haute-Saône department
