= Georfans =

- Part of Belles-Fontaines
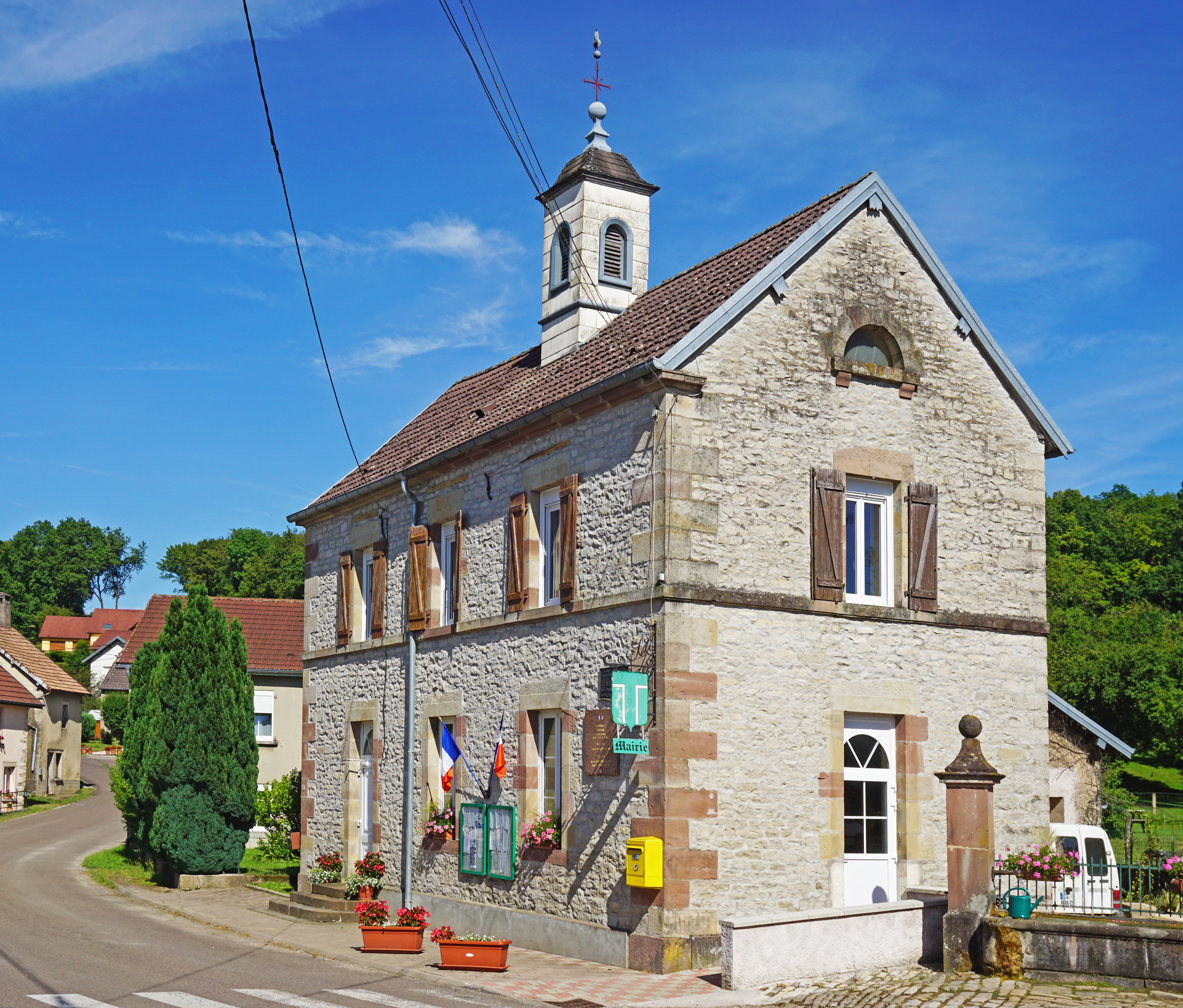
- The town hall in Georfans

- Coat of arms
- Location of Georfans
- Location within France Location within Bourgogne-Franche-Comté
- Coordinates: 47°32′13″N 6°30′47″E
- Country: France
- Region: Bourgogne-Franche-Comté
- Department: Haute-Saône
- Arrondissement: Lure
- Canton: Villersexel
- Commune: Belles-Fontaines
- Area^{1}: 2.99 km^{2} (1.15 sq mi)
- Highest elevation: 375 m (1,230 ft)
- Lowest elevation: 282 m (925 ft)
- Population (2022): 40
  - Density: 13/km^{2} (35/sq mi)
- Time zone: UTC+01:00 (CET)
  - Summer (DST): UTC+02:00 (CEST)
- Postal code: 70110
- ^{1} French Land Register data, which excludes lakes, ponds, glaciers > 1 km^{2} (0.386 sq mi or 247 acres) and river estuaries.

Georfans (French pronunciation: [ʒɔʁfɑ̃]) is a former commune in the Haute-Saône department in the region of Bourgogne-Franche-Comté in eastern France. On 1 January 2025, it was merged into the new commune of Belles-Fontaines.

== See also ==
- Communes of the Haute-Saône department
