= Vellechevreux-et-Courbenans =

- Part of Belles-Fontaines
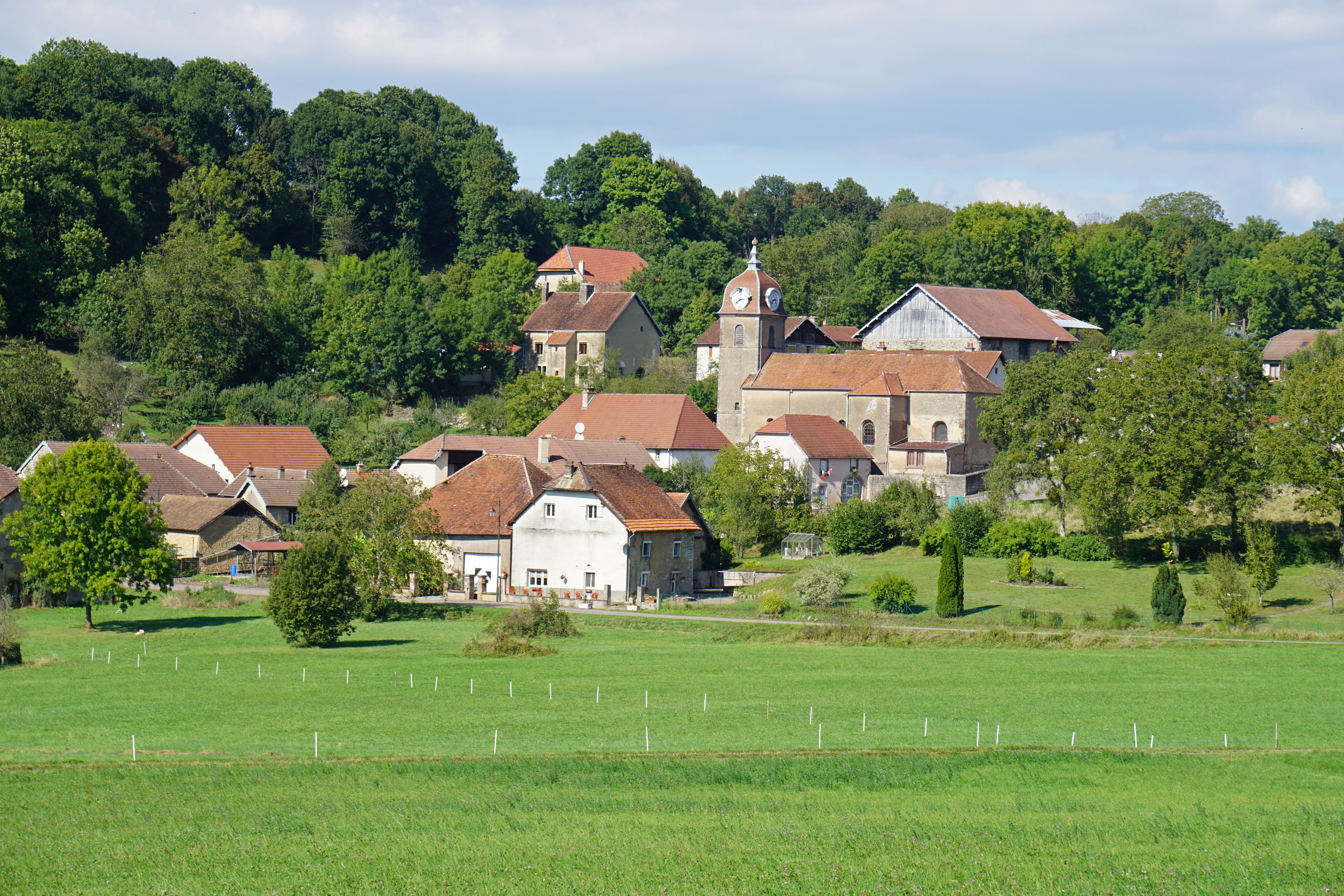
- A general view of Vellechevreux-et-Courbenans
- Location of Vellechevreux-et-Courbenans
- Location within France Location within Bourgogne-Franche-Comté
- Coordinates: 47°32′27″N 6°32′21″E
- Country: France
- Region: Bourgogne-Franche-Comté
- Department: Haute-Saône
- Arrondissement: Lure
- Canton: Villersexel
- Commune: Belles-Fontaines
- Area^{1}: 9.14 km^{2} (3.53 sq mi)
- Highest elevation: 493 m (1,617 ft)
- Lowest elevation: 289 m (948 ft)
- Population (2022): 118
  - Density: 12.9/km^{2} (33.4/sq mi)
- Time zone: UTC+01:00 (CET)
  - Summer (DST): UTC+02:00 (CEST)
- Postal code: 70110
- ^{1} French Land Register data, which excludes lakes, ponds, glaciers > 1 km^{2} (0.386 sq mi or 247 acres) and river estuaries.

Vellechevreux-et-Courbenans (French pronunciation: [vɛlʃəvʁø e kuʁbənɑ̃]) is a former commune in the Haute-Saône department in the region of Bourgogne-Franche-Comté in eastern France. On 1 January 2025, it was merged into the new commune of Belles-Fontaines.

== See also ==
- Communes of the Haute-Saône department
